= 1980 Carolina League season =

- League: Carolina League
- Sport: Baseball
- Duration: April 11 – August 31
- Games: 140
- Teams: 8

Regular season
- Season MVP: Julio Franco, Peninsula Pilots

Playoffs
- League champions: Peninsula Pilots
- Runners-up: Durham Bulls

CL seasons
- ← 1979 1981 →

The 1980 Carolina League was a Class A baseball season played between April 11 and August 31. Eight teams played a 140-game schedule, with the top team from each division competing for the league championship.

The Peninsula Pilots won the Carolina League championship, defeating the Durham Bulls in the final round of the playoffs.

== League changes ==
- With two new teams joining the league, the teams were split up into two four-team divisions.
- The new divisions are the North Division and the South Division.

== Team changes ==
- The Durham Bulls rejoin the league as an expansion team. They began an affiliation with the Atlanta Braves.
- The Rocky Mount Pines join the league as an expansion team.
- The Alexandria Mariners ended their affiliation with the Seattle Mariners. The team was renamed the Alexandria Dukes.

== Teams ==
1980 Carolina League
Division	Team	City	MLB Affiliate	Stadium
North	Durham Bulls	Durham, North Carolina	Atlanta Braves	Durham Athletic Park
North	Kinston Eagles	Kinston, North Carolina	Toronto Blue Jays	Grainger Stadium
North	Rocky Mount Pines	Rocky Mount, North Carolina	None	Municipal Stadium
North	Winston-Salem Red Sox	Winston-Salem, North Carolina	Boston Red Sox	Ernie Shore Field
South	Alexandria Dukes	Alexandria, Virginia	None	Municipal Stadium at Four Mile Run
South	Lynchburg Mets	Lynchburg, Virginia	New York Mets	City Stadium
South	Peninsula Pilots	Hampton, Virginia	Philadelphia Phillies	War Memorial Stadium
South	Salem Pirates	Salem, Virginia	Pittsburgh Pirates	Salem Municipal Field

== Map of teams ==
North division South division

== Regular season ==
=== Summary ===
- The Peninsula Pilots finished with the best record in the league for the first time since 1978.
- The Rocky Mount Pines set a league record for losses in a season (114) and lowest winning percentage (.174)
- Playoff berths are based on the winner of each half of the season in each division.

=== Standings ===
North division
Team	Win	Loss	%	GB
Durham Bulls	84	56	.600	–
Winston-Salem Red Sox	76	64	.543	8
Kinston Eagles	69	69	.500	14
Rocky Mount Pines	24	114	.174	59
South division
Peninsula Pilots	100	40	.714	–
Salem Pirates	79	60	.568	20.5
Lynchburg Mets	71	68	.511	28.5
Alexandria Dukes	54	86	.386	46

== League Leaders ==
=== Batting leaders ===
Stat	Player	Total
AVG	Wil Culmer, Peninsula Pilots	.370
H	Wil Culmer, Peninsula Pilots	184
R	Wil Culmer, Peninsula Pilots	112
2B	John Csyfalvay, Lynchburg Mets	30
3B	Bienvenido DeLaRosa, Salem Pirates	15
HR	Craig Brooks, Winston-Salem Red Sox	24
RBI	Julio Franco, Peninsula Pilots	99
SB	Albert Hall, Durham Bulls	100

=== Pitching leaders ===
Stat	Player	Total
W	Roy Smith, Peninsula Pilots	17
ERA	James Wright, Peninsula Pilots	1.85
CG	Tim Lewis, Alexandria Dukes	10
SV	Martin Rivas, Winston-Salem Red Sox	21
SO	Don Carman, Peninsula Pilots	141
IP	Jay Fredlund, Winston-Salem Red Sox	211.0

== Playoffs ==
- The Peninsula Pilots won their third Carolina League championship, defeating the Durham Bulls in four games.

=== Playoff bracket ===
Finals
N1	Durham	1
S1	Peninsula	3

== Awards ==
Carolina League awards
Award name	Recipient
Most Valuable Player	Julio Franco, Peninsula Pilots
Pitcher of the Year	Roy Smith, Peninsula Pilots
Manager of the Year	Johnny Lipon, Peninsula Pilots

== See also ==
- 1980 Major League Baseball season
