= 1986 Carolina League season =

- League: Carolina League
- Sport: Baseball
- Duration: April 10 – August 31
- Number of games: 140
- Number of teams: 8

Regular season
- Season MVP: Gregg Jefferies, Lynchburg Mets

Playoffs
- League champions: Winston-Salem Spirits
- Runners-up: Hagerstown Suns

CL seasons
- ← 1985 1987 →

The 1986 Carolina League was a Class A baseball season played between April 10 and August 31. Eight teams played a 140-game schedule, with the winners of each half of the season competing in the playoffs.

The Winston-Salem Spirits won the Carolina League championship, defeating the Hagerstown Suns in the final round of the playoffs.

== Team changes ==
- The Kinston Blue Jays ended their affiliation with the Toronto Blue Jays. The club was renamed the Kinston Eagles.
- The Peninsula Pilots ended their affiliation with the Philadelphia Phillies and began a new affiliation with the Chicago White Sox. The club was renamed the Peninsula White Sox.

== Teams ==
1986 Carolina League
Division	Team	City	MLB Affiliate	Stadium
North	Hagerstown Suns	Hagerstown, Maryland	Baltimore Orioles	Municipal Stadium
North	Lynchburg Mets	Lynchburg, Virginia	New York Mets	City Stadium
North	Prince William Pirates	Woodbridge, Virginia	Pittsburgh Pirates	Prince William County Stadium
North	Salem Redbirds	Salem, Virginia	Texas Rangers	Salem Municipal Field
South	Durham Bulls	Durham, North Carolina	Atlanta Braves	Durham Athletic Park
South	Kinston Eagles	Kinston, North Carolina	None	Grainger Stadium
South	Peninsula White Sox	Hampton, Virginia	Chicago White Sox	War Memorial Stadium
South	Winston-Salem Spirits	Winston-Salem, North Carolina	Chicago Cubs	Ernie Shore Field

== Map of teams ==
North division South division

== Regular season ==
=== Summary ===
- The Hagerstown Suns finished with the best record in the league for the first time in team history.

=== Standings ===
North division
Team	Win	Loss	%	GB
Hagerstown Suns	91	48	.655	–
Lynchburg Mets	75	65	.536	16.5
Prince William Pirates	67	72	.482	24
Salem Redbirds	45	93	.326	45.5
South division
Winston-Salem Spirits	82	56	.594	–
Durham Bulls	72	68	.514	11
Peninsula White Sox	60	74	.448	20
Kinston Eagles	60	76	.441	21

== League Leaders ==
=== Batting leaders ===
Stat	Player	Total
AVG	Gregg Jefferies, Lynchburg Mets	.354
H	Doug Dascenzo, Winston-Salem Spirits	178
R	Marcus Lawton, Lynchburg Mets	118
2B	Bob Bafia, Winston-Salem Spirits	36
3B	Marcus Lawton, Lynchburg Mets	16
HR	Ron Gant, Durham Bulls	26
RBI	Craig Worthington, Hagerstown Suns	105
SB	Pete Stanicek, Hagerstown Suns	77

=== Pitching leaders ===
Stat	Player	Total
W	Marty Reed, Kinston Eagles	16
ERA	Jeff Ballard, Hagerstown Suns	1.85
CG	Marty Reed, Kinston Eagles	9
SV	Laddie Renfroe, Winston-Salem Spirits	21
SO	Chris Ritter, Prince William Pirates	149
IP	Marty Reed, Kinston Eagles	196.2

== Playoffs ==
- The Winston-Salem Spirits won their eighth Carolina League championship, defeating the Hagerstown Suns in four games.

=== Playoff bracket ===
Finals
N1	Hagerstown	1
S1	Winston-Salem	3

== Awards ==
Carolina League awards
Award name	Recipient
Most Valuable Player	Gregg Jefferies, Lynchburg Mets
Pitcher of the Year	Dave Pavlas, Winston-Salem Spirits
Manager of the Year	Jim Essian, Winston-Salem Spirits

== See also ==
- 1986 Major League Baseball season
