= List of Carolina League stadiums =

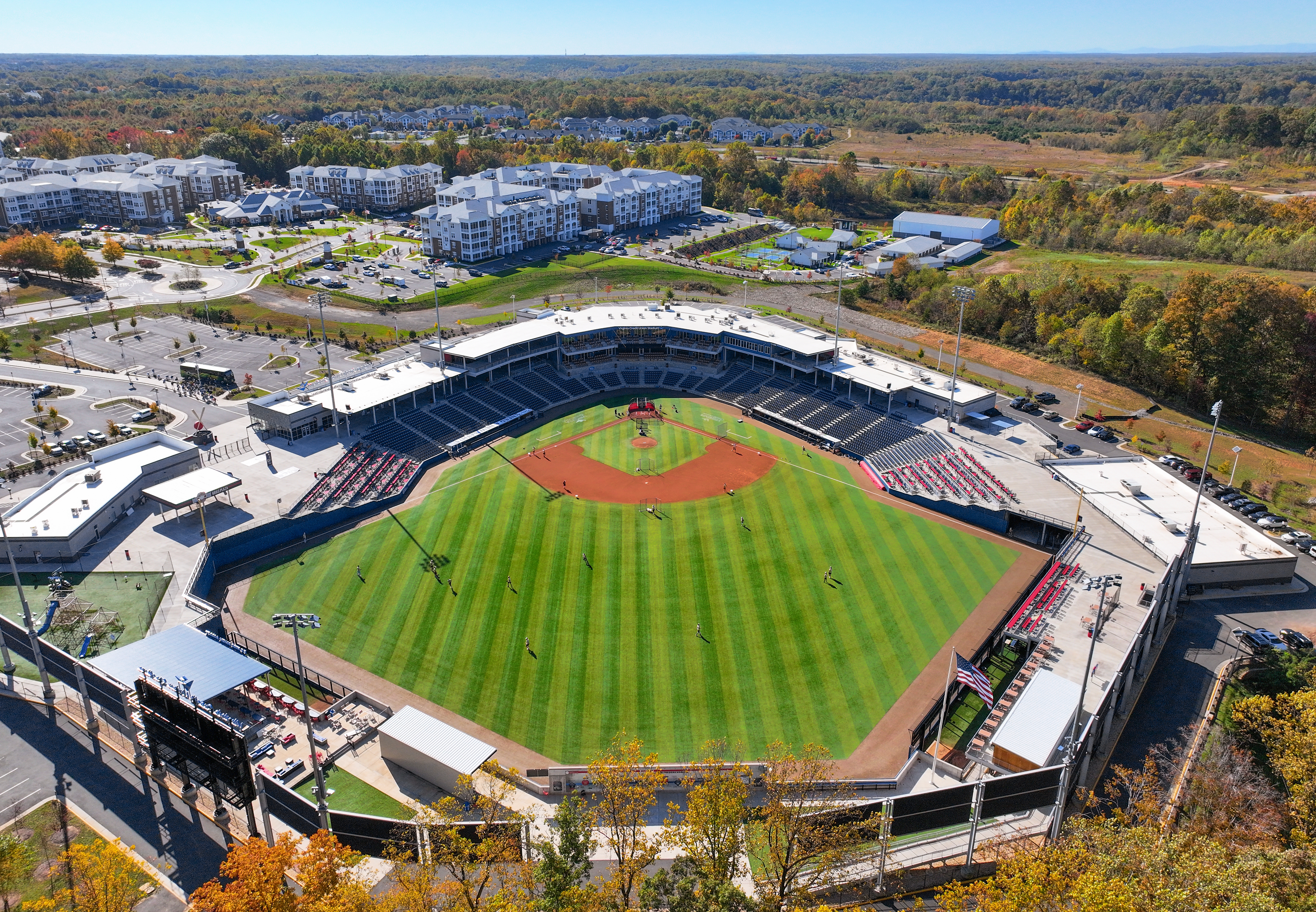
Aerial view of Virginia Credit Union Stadium, which was built in 2021 and is the home of the Fredericksburg Nationals.

Durham Athletic Park in Durham, North Carolina, hosted the Durham Bulls since the league's founding through 1994.

There are twelve stadiums in use by Carolina League (CL) baseball teams. The oldest stadium is Bank of the James Stadium (1940) in Lynchburg, Virginia, home of the Hill City Howlers. The newest stadium is Wilson Ballpark (2026) in Wilson, North Carolina, home of the Wilson Warbirds. One stadium was built in the 1940s, five in the 1990s, and three in each of the 2010s and 2020s. The highest seating capacity is 7,501 at Prisma Health Park in Columbia, South Carolina, where the Columbia Fireflies play. The lowest capacity is 3,500 at Wilson Ballpark.

Since its founding in 1945, there have been over 40 stadiums located among more than 30 municipalities used by the league. Of the stadiums with known opening dates, the oldest to have hosted CL games were McCurdy Field and Old McCormick Field (1924), former respective homes of the Frederick Keys and Asheville Tourists. Wilson Ballpark is also the newest among all CL stadiums. Frank D. Lawrence Stadium in Portsmouth, Virginia, where the Portsmouth Tides once played, had the highest known seating capacity of 11,000. The stadium with the lowest known capacity is Jim Perry Stadium in Buies Creek, North Carolina, former home of the Buies Creek Astros, which seated only 630.

== Active stadiums ==
Name	Team	City	State	Opened	Capacity	Ref.
Arthur W. Perdue Stadium	Delmarva Shorebirds	Salisbury	Maryland	1996	5,200	
Virginia Credit Union Stadium	Fredericksburg Nationals	Fredericksburg	Virginia	2021	5,000	
Bank of the James Stadium	Hill City Howlers	Lynchburg	Virginia	1940	4,000	
Salem Memorial Ballpark	Salem RidgeYaks	Salem	Virginia	1995	6,300	
Wilson Ballpark	Wilson Warbirds	Wilson	North Carolina	2026	3,500	
L. P. Frans Stadium	Hickory Crawdads	Hickory	North Carolina	1993	5,062	
Segra Stadium	Fayetteville Woodpeckers	Fayetteville	North Carolina	2019	4,786	
Atrium Health Ballpark	Kannapolis Cannon Ballers	Kannapolis	North Carolina	2021	4,930	
SRP Park	Augusta GreenJackets	North Augusta	South Carolina	2018	4,000	
Joseph P. Riley Jr. Park	Charleston RiverDogs	Charleston	South Carolina	1997	6,000	
Prisma Health Park	Columbia Fireflies	Columbia	South Carolina	2016	7,501	
Pelicans Ballpark	Myrtle Beach Pelicans	Myrtle Beach	South Carolina	1999	4,875	

=== Map ===
Current stadium locations:
- North Division
- South Division

=== Gallery ===
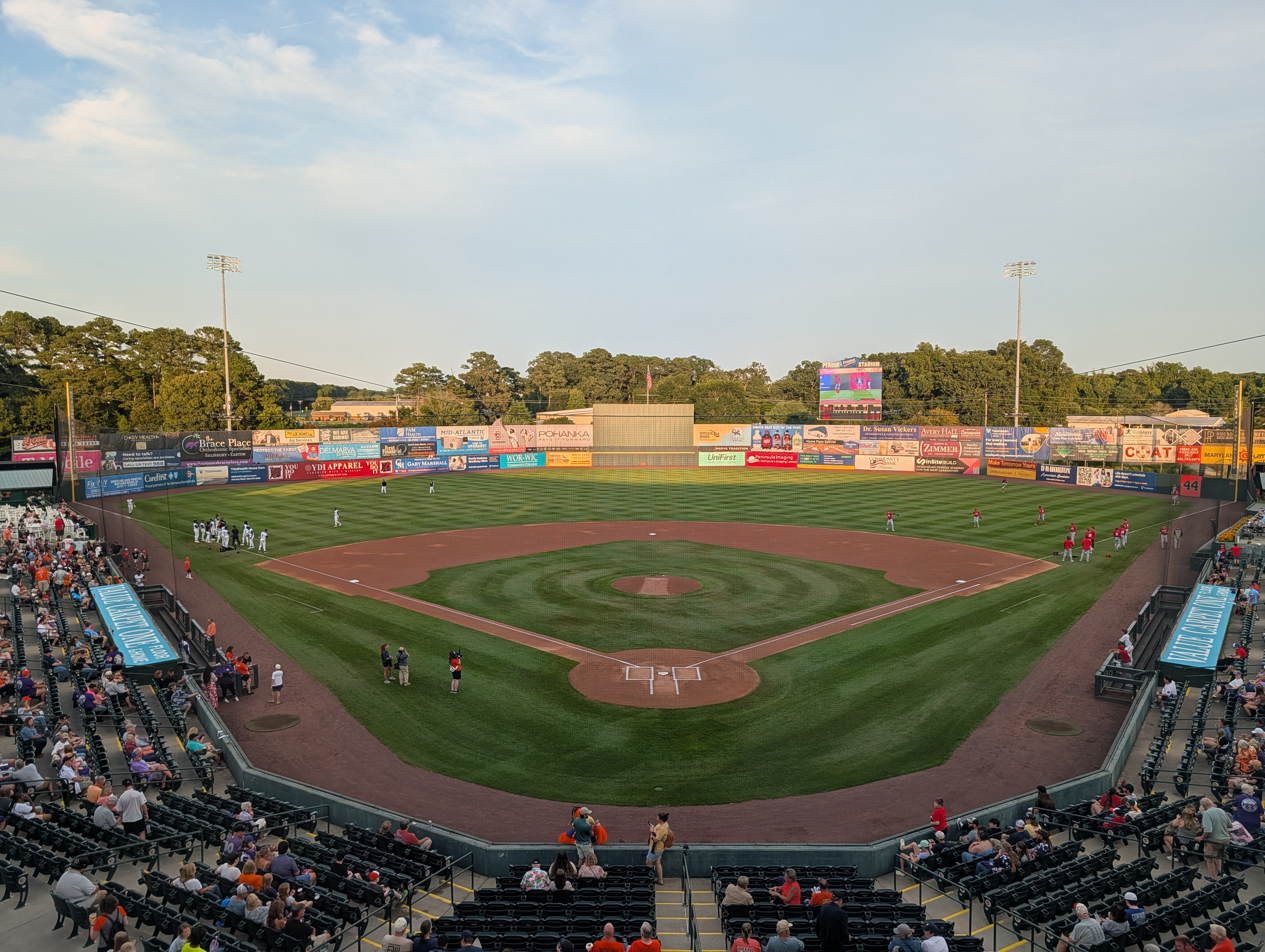
Arthur W. Perdue Stadium (Delmarva Shorebirds)

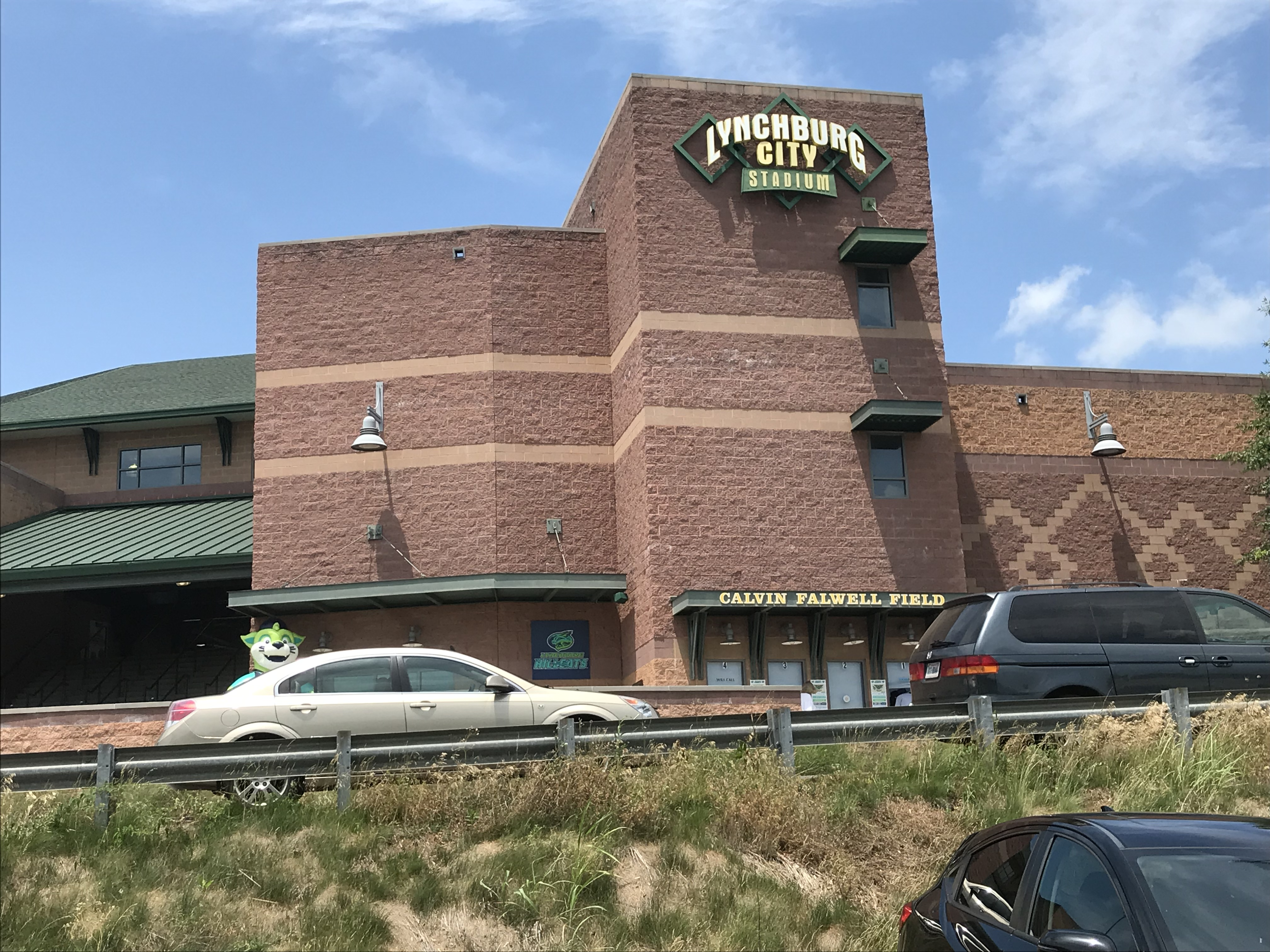
Bank of the James Stadium (Hill City Howlers)

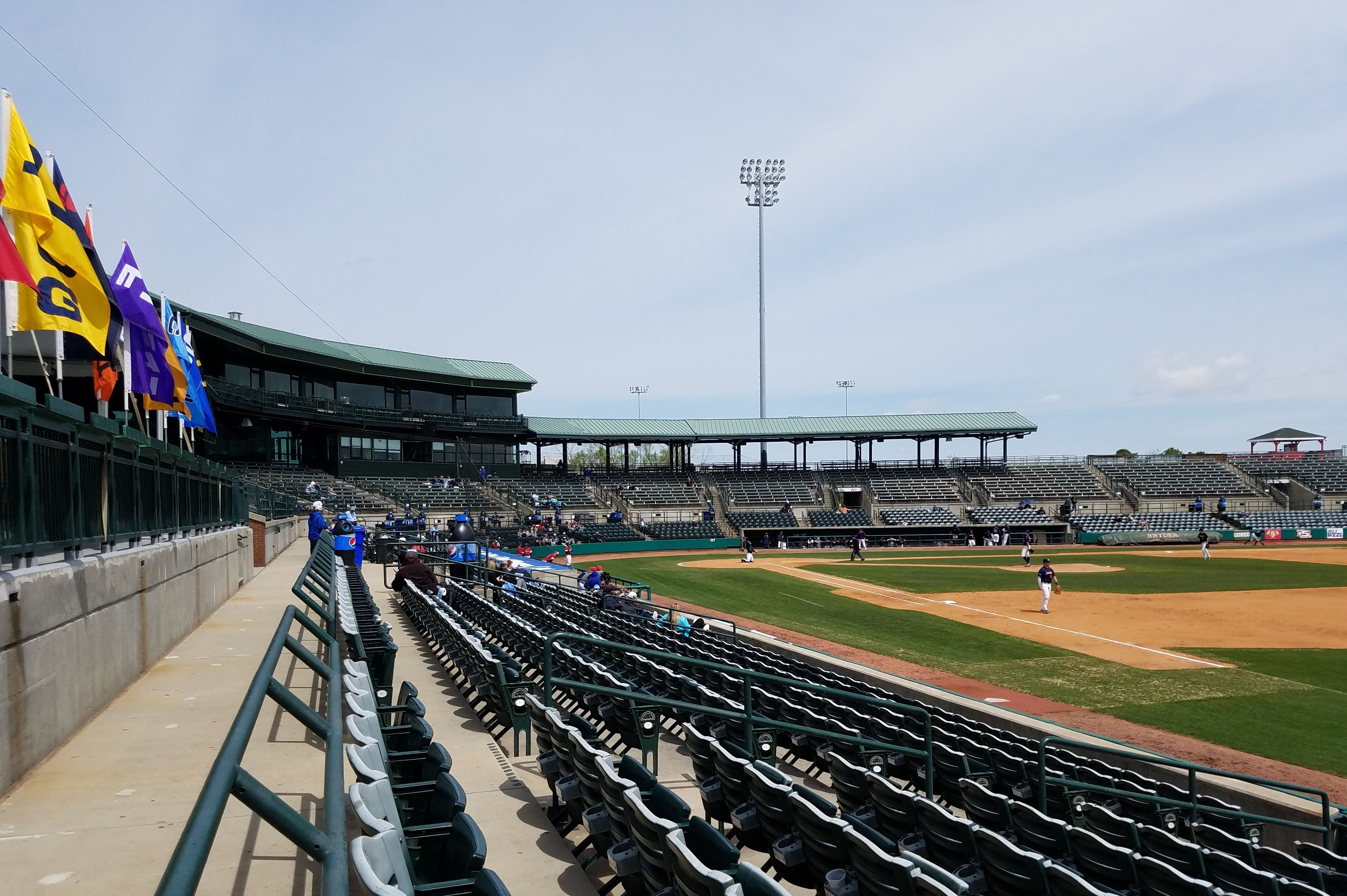
Joseph P. Riley Jr. Park (Charleston RiverDogs)

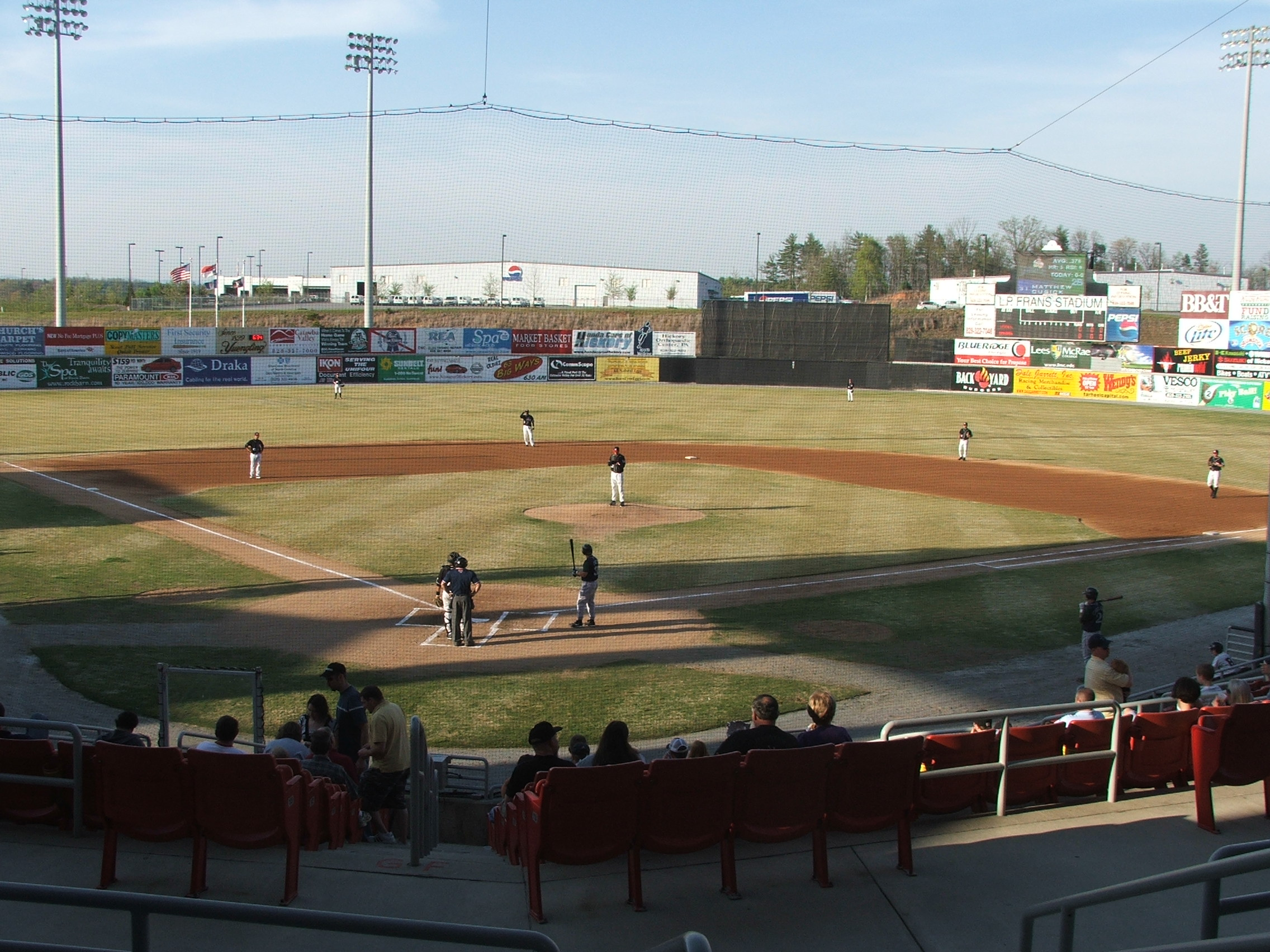
L. P. Frans Stadium (Hickory Crawdads)

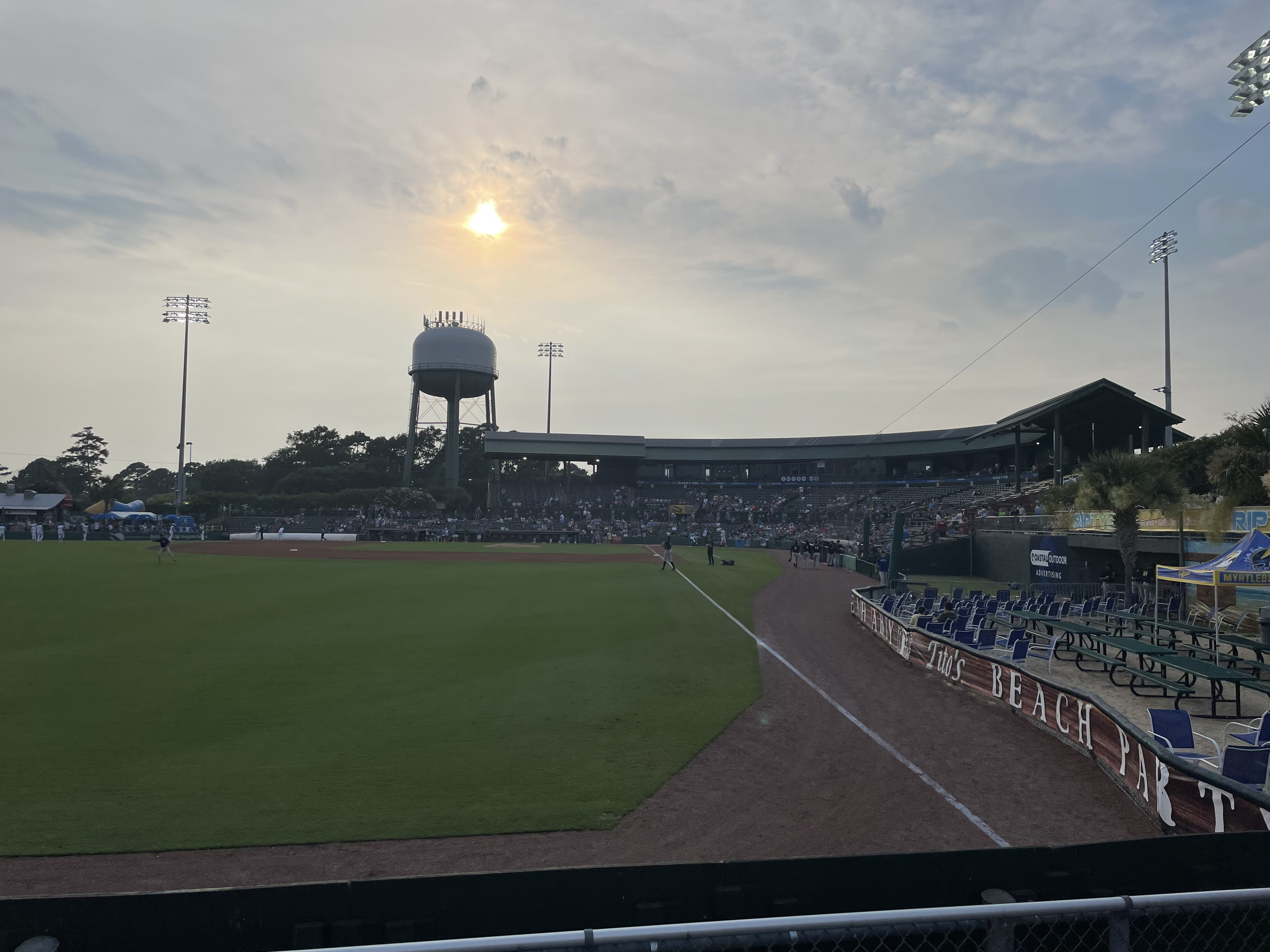
Pelicans Ballpark (Myrtle Beach Pelicans)

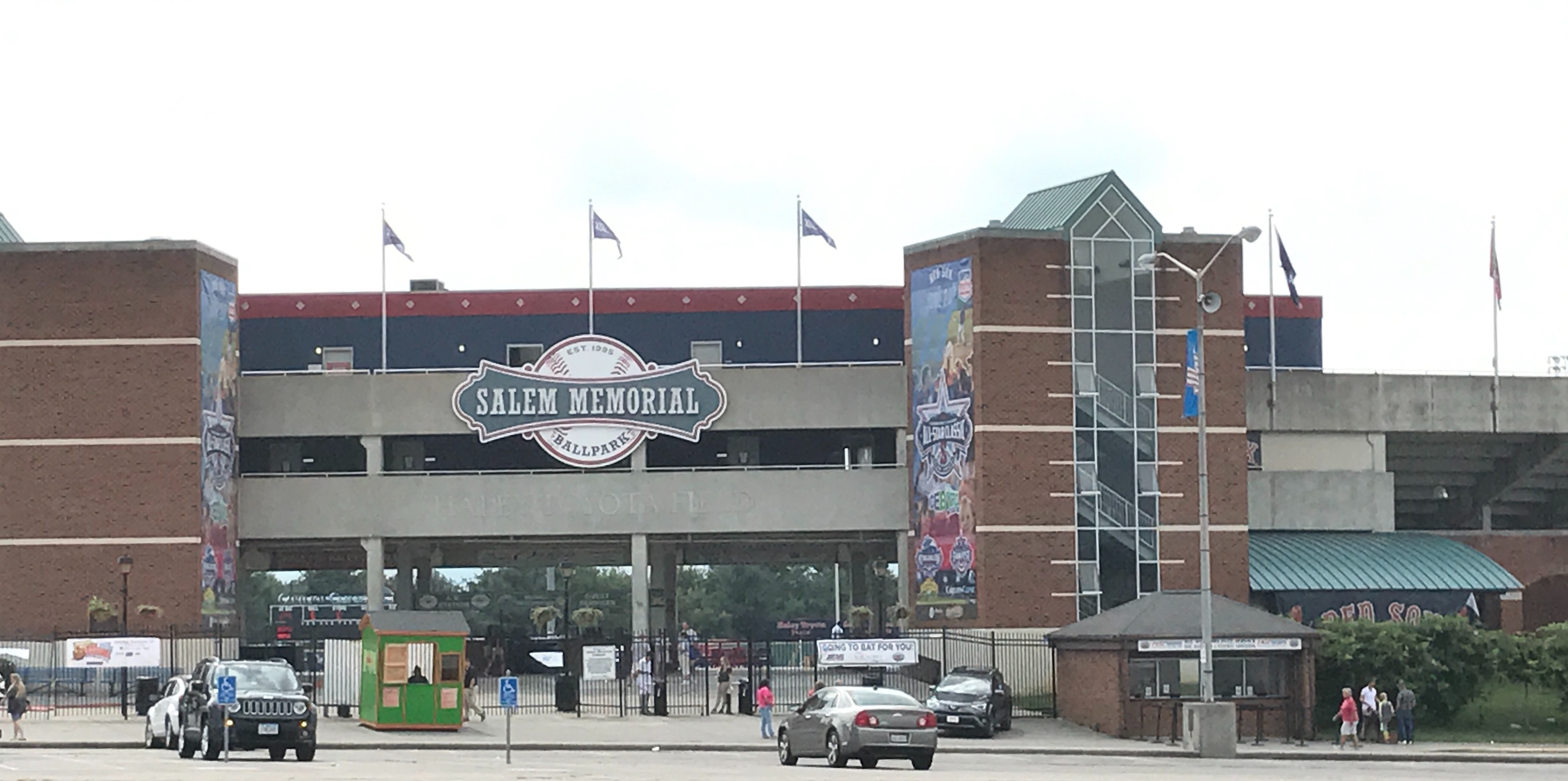
Salem Memorial Ballpark (Salem RidgeYaks)

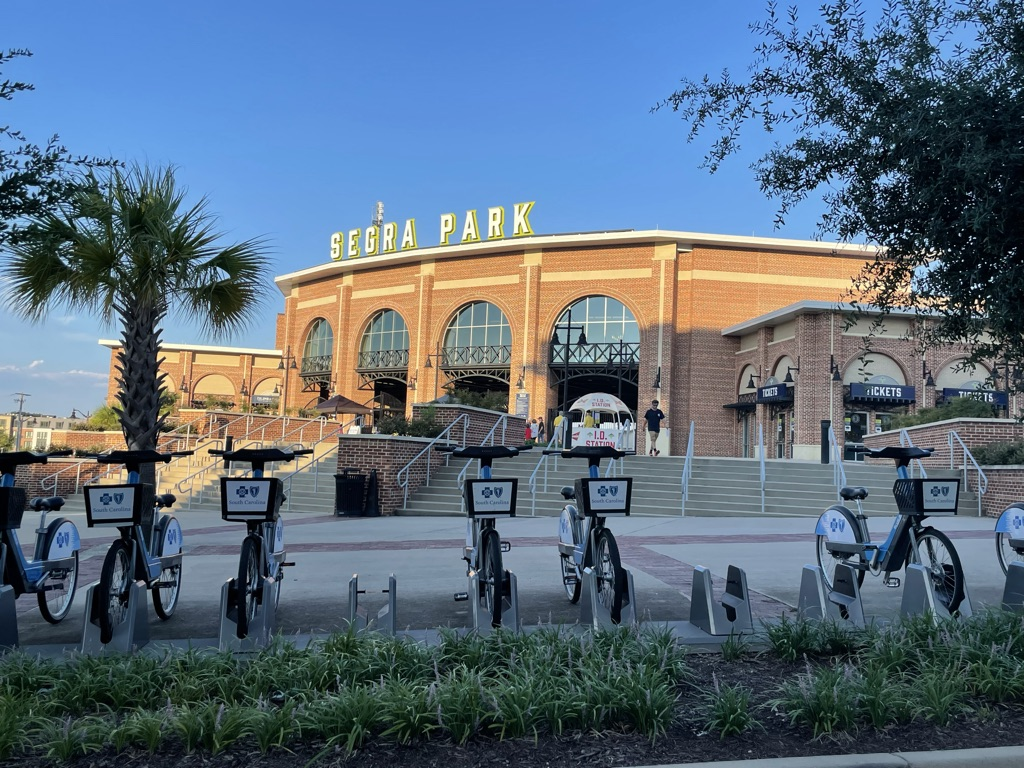
Segra Park (Columbia Fireflies)

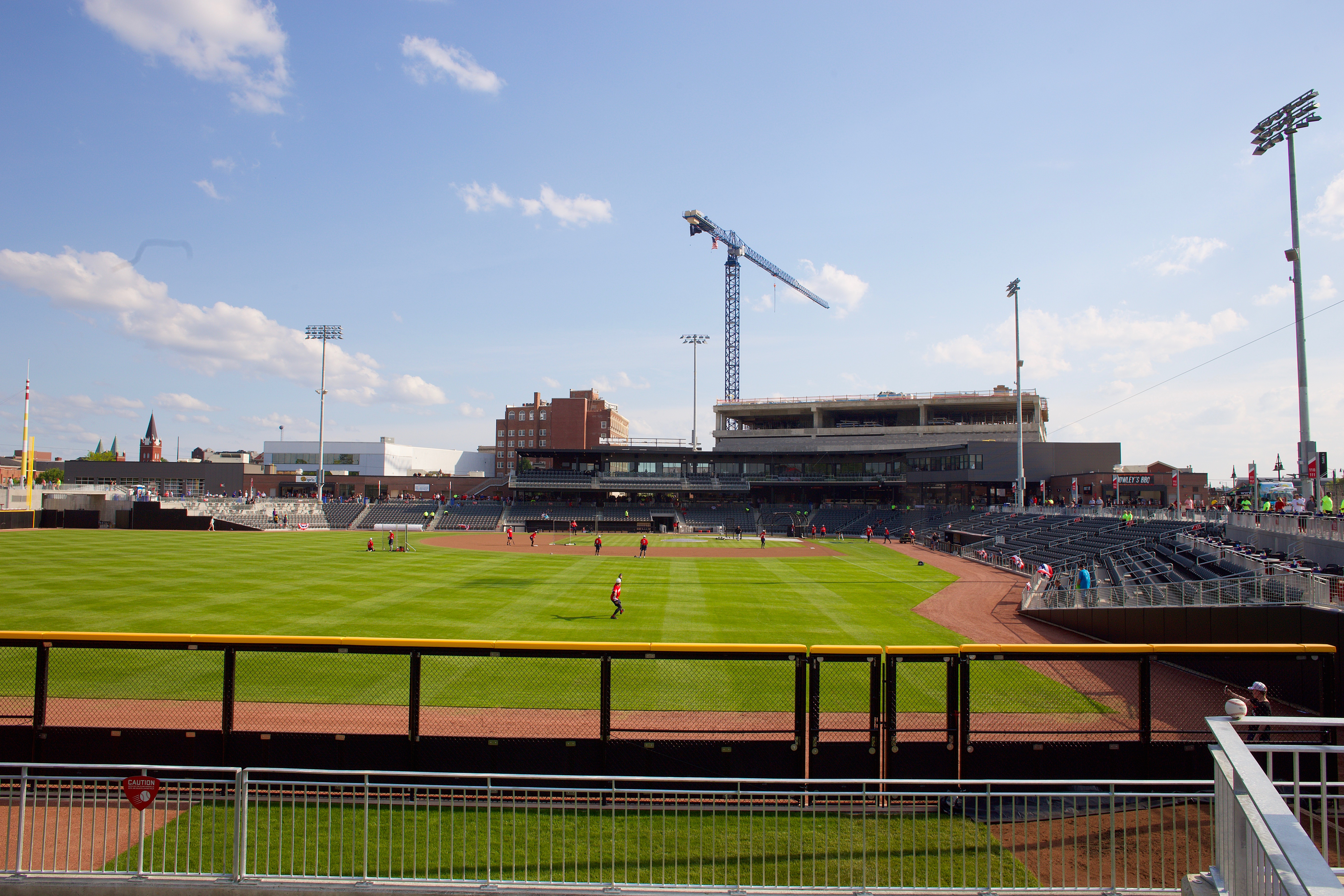
Segra Stadium (Fayetteville Woodpeckers)

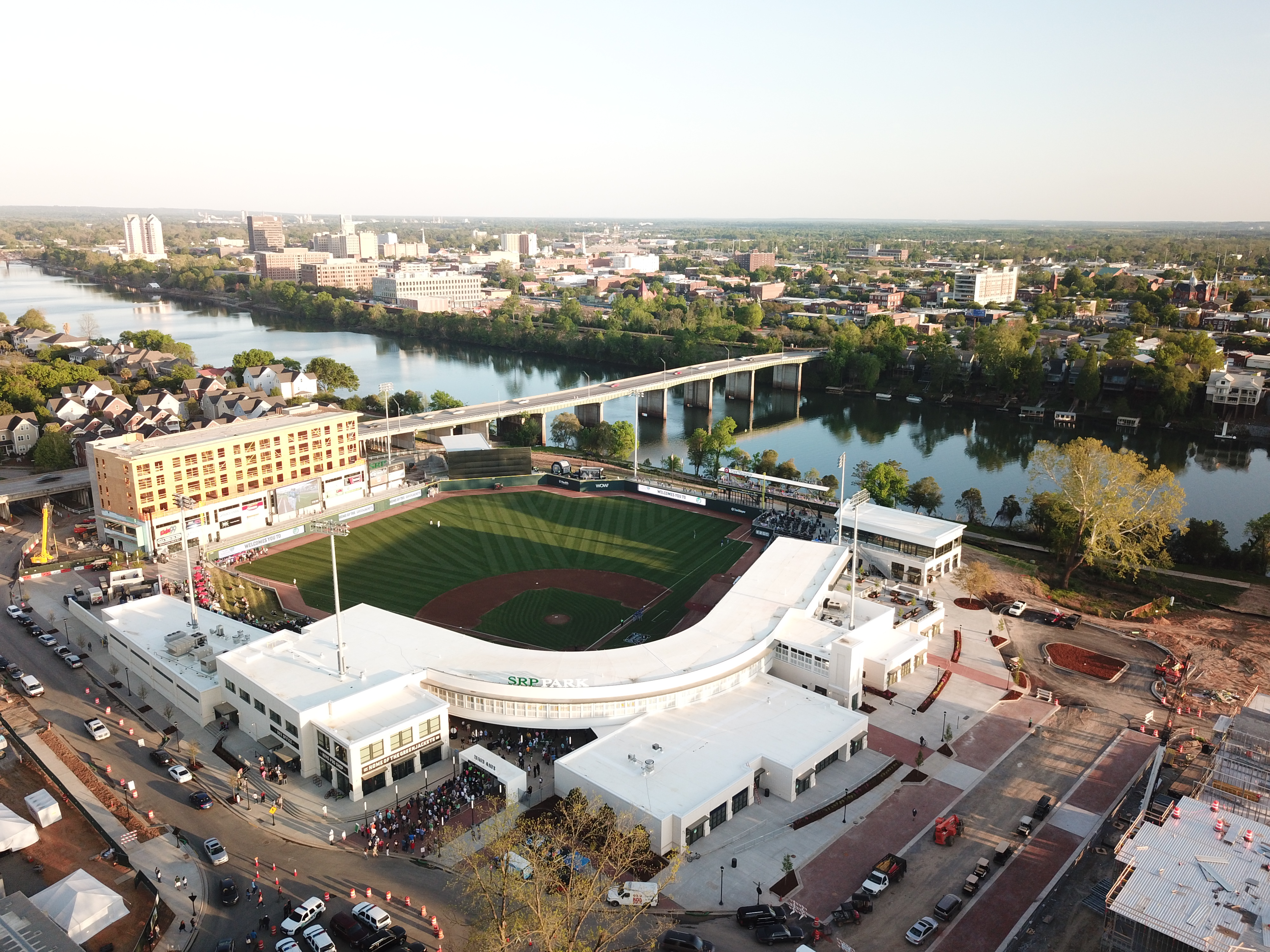
SRP Park (Augusta GreenJackets)

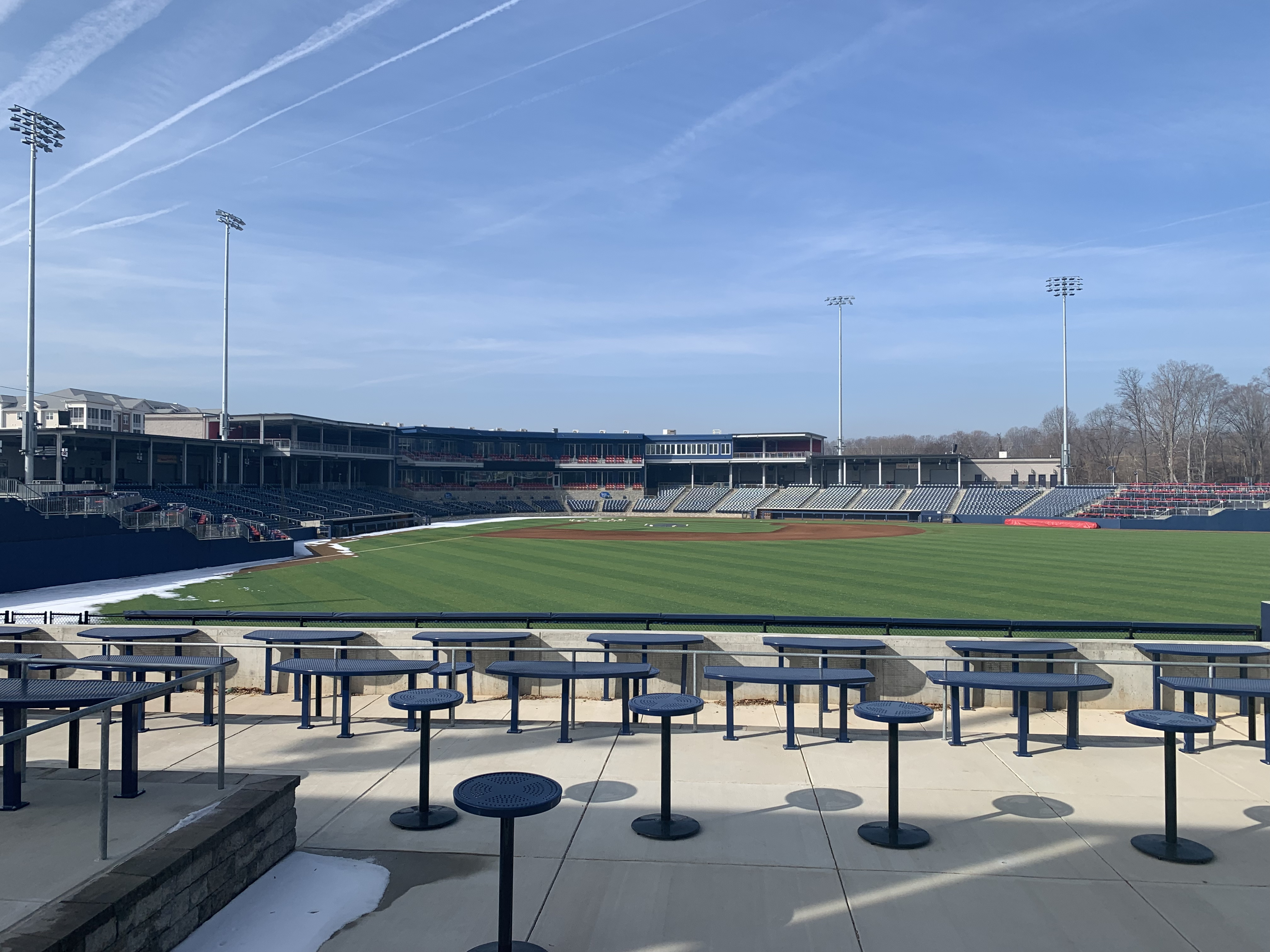
Virginia Credit Union Stadium (Fredericksburg Nationals)

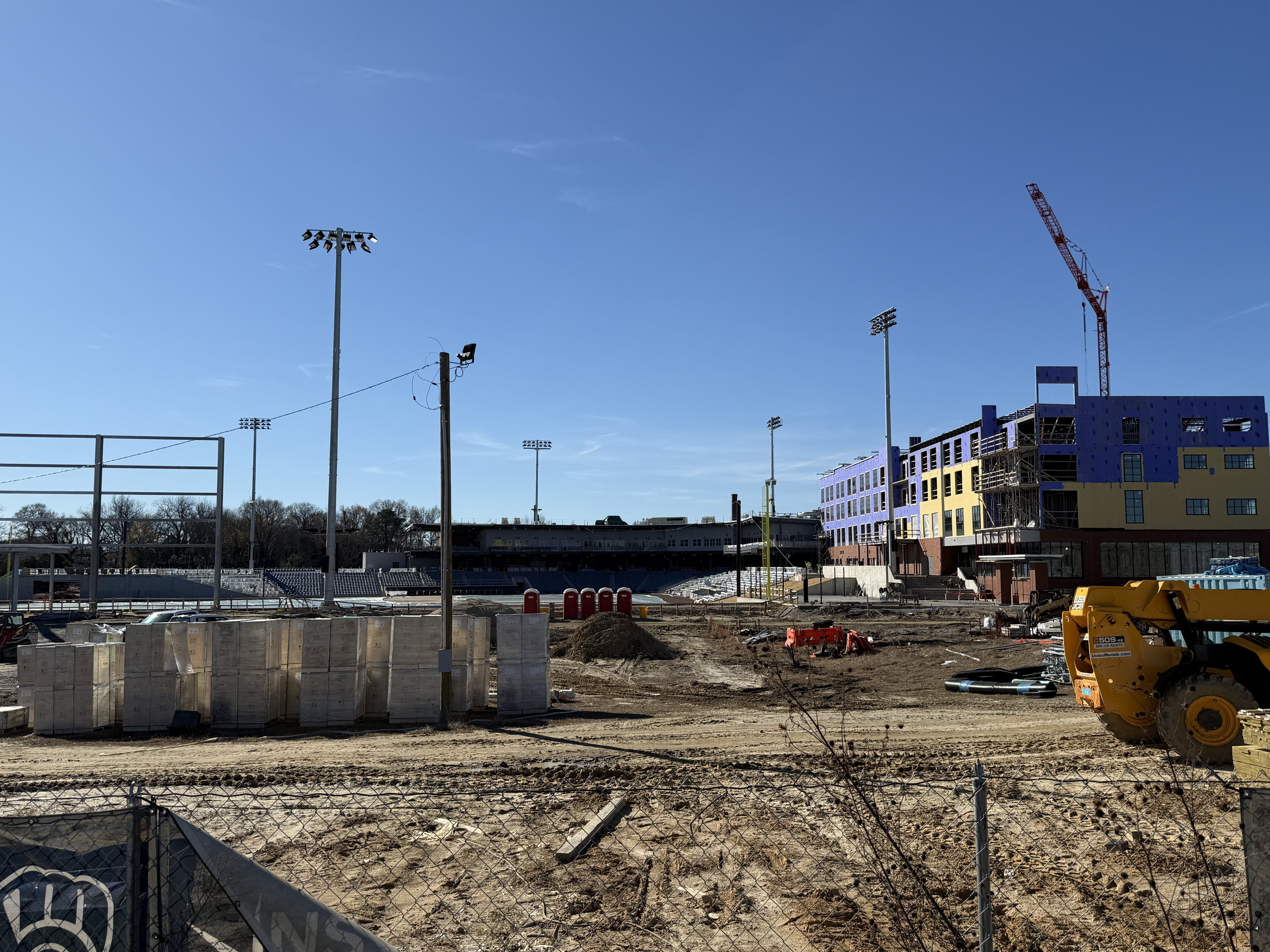
Wilson Ballpark (Wilson Warbirds)

== All stadiums ==
Key
Name	Stadium's name in its last season of hosting CL baseball
Opened	Opening of earliest stadium variant used for hosting CL baseball
Capacity	Stadium's most recent capacity while hosting CL baseball

Name	Team(s)	Locality	State	Opened	Capacity	Ref(s)
Graham Athletic Park	Alamance Indians, Burlington-Graham Pirates	Graham	North Carolina		3,000	
Burlington Athletic Stadium (Note: Burlington Athletic Stadium was known as Fairchild Park (1960–1972).)	Alamance Indians, Burlington Senators/Rangers	Burlington	North Carolina	1960	3,000	
Four Mile Run Park	Alexandria Dukes, Alexandria Mariners	Alexandria	Virginia	1976	2,016	
Old McCormick Field	Asheville Tourists	Asheville	North Carolina	1924	3,200	
SRP Park	Augusta GreenJackets	North Augusta	South Carolina	2018	4,000	
Jim Perry Stadium (Note: Jim Perry Stadium was known as Taylor Field until 2012.)	Buies Creek Astros	Buies Creek	North Carolina		630	
Elon College Park	Burlington Bees, Burlington-Graham Pirates	Burlington	North Carolina		3,500	
Hillcrest Park	Burlington Bees	Burlington	North Carolina		3,500	
Five County Stadium	Carolina Mudcats	Zebulon	North Carolina	1991	6,500	
Joseph P. Riley Jr. Park	Charleston RiverDogs	Charleston	South Carolina	1997	6,000	
Prisma Health Park	Columbia Fireflies	Columbia	South Carolina	2016	7,501	
Legion Stadium (Note: Legion Stadium is also known as Dan Daniel Stadium and American Legion Field.)	Danville 97s, Danville Braves	Danville	Virginia	1992	2,588	
League Park (Note: League Park was known as Bi-State Park (1937–1938).)	Danville-Schoolfield Leafs, Danville Leafs	Danville	Virginia		3,500	
Arthur W. Perdue Stadium	Delmarva Shorebirds	Salisbury	Maryland	1996	5,200	
Grainger Stadium (Note: Grainger Stadium is also known as Municipal Park.)	Kinston Eagles, (Note: The Kinston Eagles moved to Wilson, North Carolina, on May 11, 1957, and were renamed the Wilson Tobs.) Kinston Expos, Kinston Blue Jays/Indians, Down East Wood Ducks	Kinston	North Carolina	1949	4,100	
Durham Athletic Park	Durham Bulls	Durham	North Carolina	1939	5,000	
Durham Bulls Athletic Park	Durham Bulls	Durham	North Carolina	1995	10,000	
Pittman Stadium (Note: Pittman Stadium was known as Cumberland Memorial Stadium (1946–1949).)	Fayetteville Athletics, Fayetteville Highlanders	Fayetteville	North Carolina	1946	4,000	
Segra Stadium	Fayetteville Woodpeckers	Fayetteville	North Carolina	2019	4,786	
McCurdy Field	Frederick Keys	Frederick	Maryland	1924	1,500	
Harry Grove Stadium	Frederick Keys	Frederick	Maryland	1989	5,500	
Virginia Credit Union Stadium	Fredericksburg Nationals	Fredericksburg	Virginia	2021	5,000	
War Memorial Stadium	Greensboro Patriots/Yankees	Greensboro	North Carolina	1926	10,000	
Municipal Stadium	Hagerstown Suns	Hagerstown	Maryland	1930	4,600	
L. P. Frans Stadium	Hickory Crawdads	Hickory	North Carolina	1993	5,062	
Finch Field	High Point-Thomasville Hi-Toms/Royals	Thomasville	North Carolina		3,500	
Bank of the James Stadium (Note: Bank of the James Stadium was known as Municipal Stadium (1940–1950), Lynchburg City Stadium (1955–1999), and Merritt Hutchinson Stadium (2000–2002).)	Lynchburg White Sox/Twins/Rangers/Mets/Reds Sox/Hillcats, Hill City Howlers	Lynchburg	Virginia	1940	4,000	
Atrium Health Ballpark	Kannapolis Cannon Ballers	Kannapolis	North Carolina	2021	4,930	
Tri-City Baseball Park	Leaksville–Draper–Spray Triplets	Eden	North Carolina		3,000	
Doug English Field (Note: Doug English Field was previously known as Hooker Field.)	Martinsville Athletics	Martinsville	Virginia		3,500	
Pelicans Ballpark (Note: Pelicans Ballpark was previously known as Coastal Federal Field (2004–2007) and BB&T Coastal Field.)	Myrtle Beach Pelicans	Myrtle Beach	South Carolina	1999	4,875	
War Memorial Stadium (Note: War Memorial Stadium is also known as Peninsula Stadium.)	Peninsula Senators/Grays/Astros/Phillies/Pennants/Pilots/White Sox, Virginia Generals	Hampton	Virginia		4,600	
Frank D. Lawrence Stadium (Note: Frank D. Lawrence Stadium is also known as Portsmouth Stadium.)	Portsmouth Tides	Portsmouth	Virginia	1941	11,000	
Pfitzner Stadium (Note: Pfitzner Stadium was known as Davis Ford Park (1985–1986) and Prince William County Stadium (1987–1993).)	Prince William Pirates/Yankees/Cannons, Potomac Cannons/Nationals	Woodbridge	Virginia		6,000	
Devereaux Meadow	Raleigh Capitals/Mets/Cards/Cardinals/Pirates, Raleigh-Durham Mets, Raleigh-Durham Phillies/Triangles	Raleigh	North Carolina	1939	4,800	
Robbins Park	Red Springs Twins	Red Springs	North Carolina		2,000	
Kiker Stadium	Reidsville Luckies/Phillies	Reidsville	North Carolina		4,500	
Municipal Stadium (Note: Municipal Stadium was known as Briles Park (1915–1917), Tar Heel Park (1920–1929), and Briles Field (1946).)	Rocky Mount Leafs/Senators/Pines, Rocky Mount Phillies	Rocky Mount	North Carolina		4,500	
Municipal Field	Salem Rebels/Pirates/Redbirds/Buccaneers	Salem	Virginia	1932	3,000	
Salem Memorial Ballpark (Note: Salem Memorial Ballpark was known Salem Baseball Stadium (1995).)	Salem Avalanche/Red Sox/RidgeYaks	Salem	Virginia	1995	6,300	
Daniel S. Frawley Stadium (Note: Daniel S. Frawley Stadium was known as Legends Stadium (1993–1994).)	Wilmington Blue Rocks	Wilmington	Delaware	1993	6,404	
Fleming Stadium (Note: Fleming Stadium was known as Wilson Municipal Park (1939–1947) and Wilson Municipal Stadium (1948–1951).)	Wilson Tobs/Pennants (Note: The Wilson Tobs started the 1957 season as the Kinston Eagles and moved from Kinston, North Carolina, on May 11.)	Wilson	North Carolina	1938	5,000	
Wilson Ballpark (Note: Wilson Ballpark is also known as Wilson Sports + Entertainment Complex (WiSE).)	Wilson Warbirds	Wilson	North Carolina	2026	3,500	
Southside Park	Winston-Salem Cardinals/Twins	Winston-Salem	North Carolina		5,000	
Ernie Shore Field	Winston-Salem Cardinals/Twins/Red Birds/Red Sox/Spirits/Warthogs/Dash	Winston-Salem	North Carolina		6,280	
BB&T Ballpark	Winston-Salem Dash	Winston-Salem	North Carolina	2010	5,500	

=== Map ===
Carolina League stadium locations

== See also ==
- List of Single-A baseball stadiums
- List of California League stadiums
- List of Florida State League stadiums
