= 1979 Carolina League season =

- League: Carolina League
- Sport: Baseball
- Duration: April 13 – September 1
- Number of games: 140
- Number of teams: 6

Regular season
- Season MVP: Bob Dernier, Peninsula Pilots

Playoffs
- League champions: Winston-Salem Red Sox

CL seasons
- ← 1978 1980 →

The 1979 Carolina League was a Class A baseball season played between April 13 and September 1. Six teams played a 140-game schedule, with the top team in each half of the season competing for the championship.

The Winston-Salem Red Sox won the Carolina League championship, as they finished in first place in both halves of the season.

== Team changes ==
- The Alexandria Dukes began an affiliation with the Seattle Mariners. The club is renamed the Alexandria Mariners.
- The Kinston Eagles began an affiliation with the Toronto Blue Jays.

== Teams ==
1979 Carolina League
Team	City	MLB Affiliate	Stadium
Alexandria Mariners	Alexandria, Virginia	Seattle Mariners	Municipal Stadium at Four Mile Run
Kinston Eagles	Kinston, North Carolina	Toronto Blue Jays	Grainger Stadium
Lynchburg Mets	Lynchburg, Virginia	New York Mets	City Stadium
Peninsula Pilots	Hampton, Virginia	Philadelphia Phillies	War Memorial Stadium
Salem Pirates	Salem, Virginia	Pittsburgh Pirates	Salem Municipal Field
Winston-Salem Red Sox	Winston-Salem, North Carolina	Boston Red Sox	Ernie Shore Field

== Map of teams ==
Carolina League teams

== Regular season ==
=== Summary ===
- The Winston-Salem Red Sox finished with the best record in the league for the first time since 1976.

=== Standings ===
Carolina League
Team	Win	Loss	%	GB
Winston-Salem Red Sox	85	55	.607	–
Alexandria Mariners	74	62	.544	9
Peninsula Pilots	68	68	.500	15
Kinston Eagles	67	69	.493	16
Lynchburg Mets	61	73	.455	21
Salem Pirates	54	82	.397	29

== League Leaders ==
=== Batting leaders ===
Stat	Player	Total
AVG	Pat Kelly, Kinston Eagles	.309
H	Reid Nichols, Winston-Salem Red Sox	156
R	Reid Nichols, Winston-Salem Red Sox	107
2B	Greg Walker, Peninsula Pilots	27
3B	Robert Silverman, Kinston Eagles	12
HR	Gary Pellant, Alexandria Mariners	18
RBI	Mike Fitzgerald, Lynchburg Mets	75
SB	Bob Dernier, Peninsula Pilots	77

=== Pitching leaders ===
Stat	Player	Total
W	Bryan Clark, Alexandria Mariners; Thomas Hart, Peninsula Pilots	14
ERA	Thomas Hart, Peninsula Pilots	2.22
CG	Steve Crawford, Winston-Salem Red Sox	15
SV	Jeff Cary, Alexandria Mariners	21
SO	Mike Howard, Winston-Salem Red Sox	161
IP	Steve Crawford, Winston-Salem Red Sox	211.0

== Playoffs ==
- The Winston-Salem Red Sox won their seventh Carolina League championship.
- There was no playoffs as the Red Sox finished in first place in both halves of the season.

== Awards ==
Carolina League awards
Award name	Recipient
Most Valuable Player	Bob Dernier, Peninsula Pilots
Pitcher of the Year	Thomas Hart Peninsula Pilots
Manager of the Year	Bill Slack, Winston-Salem Red Sox

== See also ==
- 1979 Major League Baseball season
