= 1981 Carolina League season =

- League: Carolina League
- Sport: Baseball
- Duration: April 10 – August 31
- Number of games: 140
- Number of teams: 8

Regular season
- Season MVP: Brad Komminsk, Durham Bulls

Playoffs
- League champions: Hagerstown Suns
- Runners-up: Peninsula Pilots

CL seasons
- ← 1980 1982 →

The 1981 Carolina League was a Class A baseball season played between April 10 and August 31. Eight teams played a 140-game schedule, with the winners of each half of the season competing in the playoffs.

The Hagerstown Suns won the Carolina League championship, defeating the Peninsula Pilots in the final round of the playoffs.

== Team changes ==
- The Rocky Mount Pines relocated to Hagerstown, Maryland, and are renamed the Hagerstown Suns. The club began an affiliation with the Baltimore Orioles.
- The Salem Pirates ended their affiliation with the Pittsburgh Pirates and began a new affiliation with the San Diego Padres. The club is renamed the Salem Redbirds.
- The Alexandria Dukes began an affiliation with the Pittsburgh Pirates.

== Teams ==
1981 Carolina League
Division	Team	City	MLB Affiliate	Stadium
North	Alexandria Dukes	Alexandria, Virginia	Pittsburgh Pirates	Municipal Stadium at Four Mile Run
North	Hagerstown Suns	Hagerstown, Maryland	Baltimore Orioles	Municipal Stadium
North	Lynchburg Mets	Lynchburg, Virginia	New York Mets	City Stadium
North	Salem Redbirds	Salem, Virginia	San Diego Padres	Salem Municipal Field
South	Durham Bulls	Durham, North Carolina	Atlanta Braves	Durham Athletic Park
South	Kinston Eagles	Kinston, North Carolina	Toronto Blue Jays	Grainger Stadium
South	Peninsula Pilots	Hampton, Virginia	Philadelphia Phillies	War Memorial Stadium
South	Winston-Salem Red Sox	Winston-Salem, North Carolina	Boston Red Sox	Ernie Shore Field

== Map of teams ==
North division South division

== Regular season ==
=== Summary ===
- The Peninsula Pilots finished with the best record in the league for the second consecutive season.

=== Standings ===
North division
Team	Win	Loss	%	GB
Hagerstown Suns	70	68	.507	–
Lynchburg Mets	71	69	.507	–
Salem Redbirds	66	74	.471	5
Alexandria Dukes	62	75	.453	7.5
South division
Peninsula Pilots	71	65	.522	–
Winston-Salem Red Sox	72	67	.518	0.5
Kinston Eagles	72	68	.514	1
Durham Bulls	70	68	.507	2

== League Leaders ==
=== Batting leaders ===
Stat	Player	Total
AVG	Brad Komminsk, Durham Bulls	.322
H	Brad Komminsk, Durham Bulls; Benjamin Perez, Kinston Eagles	148
R	Gerry Davis, Salem Redbirds	114
2B	John Schaive, Alexandria Dukes	33
3B	Billy Beane, Lynchburg Mets; John Pavlik, Hagerstown Suns	9
HR	Gerry Davis, Salem Redbirds	34
RBI	Brad Komminsk, Durham Bulls	104
SB	Gus Burgess, Winston-Salem Red Sox	68

=== Pitching leaders ===
Stat	Player	Total
W	Mike Brown, Winston-Salem Red Sox	14
ERA	Mike Brown, Winston-Salem Red Sox	1.49
CG	Mike Brown, Winston-Salem Red Sox	12
SV	Marty Decker, Peninsula Pilots	18
SO	Jeff Bittiger, Lynchburg Mets	168
IP	Rick Behenna, Durham Bulls	196.0

== Playoffs ==
- The Hagerstown Suns won their first Carolina League championship, defeating the Peninsula Pilots in three games.

=== Playoff bracket ===
Semi-finals
N1	Hagerstown	1
N2	Salem	0
S1	Peninsula	1
S2	Kinston	0

Finals
N1	Hagerstown	3
S1	Peninsula	0

== Awards ==
Carolina League awards
Award name	Recipient
Most Valuable Player	Brad Komminsk, Durham Bulls
Pitcher of the Year	Mike Brown, Winston-Salem Red Sox
Manager of the Year	Grady Little, Hagerstown Suns

== See also ==
- 1981 Major League Baseball season
