= 1982 Carolina League season =

- League: Carolina League
- Sport: Baseball
- Duration: April 9 – August 31
- Games: 140
- Teams: 8

Regular season
- Season MVP: Juan Samuel, Peninsula Pilots

Playoffs
- League champions: Alexandria Dukes
- Runners-up: Durham Bulls

CL seasons
- ← 1981 1983 →

The 1982 Carolina League was a Class A baseball season played between April 9 and August 31. Eight teams played a 140-game schedule, with the winners of each half of the season competing in the playoffs.

The Alexandria Dukes won the Carolina League championship, defeating the Durham Bulls in the final round of the playoffs.

== Team changes ==
- The Kinston Eagles are renamed the Kinston Blue Jays. The club continued their affiliation with the Toronto Blue Jays.

== Teams ==
1982 Carolina League
Division	Team	City	MLB Affiliate	Stadium
North	Alexandria Dukes	Alexandria, Virginia	Pittsburgh Pirates	Municipal Stadium at Four Mile Run
North	Hagerstown Suns	Hagerstown, Maryland	Baltimore Orioles	Municipal Stadium
North	Lynchburg Mets	Lynchburg, Virginia	New York Mets	City Stadium
North	Salem Redbirds	Salem, Virginia	San Diego Padres	Salem Municipal Field
South	Durham Bulls	Durham, North Carolina	Atlanta Braves	Durham Athletic Park
South	Kinston Blue Jays	Kinston, North Carolina	Toronto Blue Jays	Grainger Stadium
South	Peninsula Pilots	Hampton, Virginia	Philadelphia Phillies	War Memorial Stadium
South	Winston-Salem Red Sox	Winston-Salem, North Carolina	Boston Red Sox	Ernie Shore Field

== Map of teams ==
North division South division

== Regular season ==
=== Summary ===
- The Peninsula Pilots finished with the best record in the league for the third consecutive season.

=== Standings ===
North division
Team	Win	Loss	%	GB
Alexandria Dukes	80	54	.597	–
Hagerstown Suns	71	65	.522	10
Lynchburg Mets	65	71	.478	16
Salem Redbirds	39	101	.279	44
South division
Peninsula Pilots	90	47	.657	–
Durham Bulls	80	56	.588	9.5
Kinston Blue Jays	76	59	.563	13
Winston-Salem Red Sox	45	93	.326	45.5

== League Leaders ==
=== Batting leaders ===
Stat	Player	Total
AVG	Rick Renteria, Alexandria Dukes	.331
H	Rick Renteria, Alexandria Dukes	168
R	Juan Samuel, Peninsula Pilots	111
2B	Francisco Meléndez, Peninsula Pilots	33
3B	Jeff Stone, Peninsula Pilots	13
HR	Dave Malpeso, Winston-Salem Red Sox	29
RBI	Rick Renteria, Alexandria Dukes	100
SB	Jeff Stone, Peninsula Pilots	94

=== Pitching leaders ===
Stat	Player	Total
W	Charles Hudson, Peninsula Pilots; Jack McKnight, Kinston Blue Jays	15
ERA	Charles Hudson, Peninsula Pilots	1.85
CG	Bill Fultz, Lynchburg Mets	12
SV	Dave Shipanoff, Kinston Blue Jays	30
SO	Tony Ghelfi, Peninsula Pilots	162
IP	Bill Fultz, Lynchburg Mets	188.1

== Playoffs ==
- The Alexandria Dukes won their first Carolina League championship, defeating the Durham Bulls in three games.

=== Playoff bracket ===
Semi-finals
N1	Alexandria	1
N2	Lynchburg	0
S1	Peninsula	0
S2	Durham	1

Finals
N1	Alexandria	3
S2	Durham	0

== Awards ==
Carolina League awards
Award name	Recipient
Most Valuable Player	Juan Samuel, Peninsula Pilots
Pitcher of the Year	Charles Hudson, Peninsula Pilots
Manager of the Year	Bill Dancy, Peninsula Pilots

== See also ==
- 1982 Major League Baseball season
