= 1984 Carolina League season =

- League: Carolina League
- Sport: Baseball
- Duration: April 10 – August 31
- Number of games: 140
- Number of teams: 8

Regular season
- Season MVP: Barry Lyons, Lynchburg Mets

Playoffs
- League champions: Lynchburg Mets
- Runners-up: Durham Bulls

CL seasons
- ← 1983 1985 →

The 1984 Carolina League was a Class A baseball season played between April 10 and August 31. Eight teams played a 140-game schedule, with the winners of each half of the season competing in the playoffs.

The Lynchburg Mets won the Carolina League championship, defeating the Durham Bulls in the final round of the playoffs.

== Team changes ==
- The Alexandria Dukes relocated to Woodbridge, Virginia, and were renamed the Prince William Pirates. The club remained affiliated with the Pittsburgh Pirates.
- The Salem Redbirds ended their affiliation with the San Diego Padres and began a new affiliation with the Texas Rangers.
- The Winston-Salem Red Sox are renamed to the Winston-Salem Spirits. The club remains affiliated with the Boston Red Sox.

== Teams ==
1984 Carolina League
Division	Team	City	MLB Affiliate	Stadium
North	Hagerstown Suns	Hagerstown, Maryland	Baltimore Orioles	Municipal Stadium
North	Lynchburg Mets	Lynchburg, Virginia	New York Mets	City Stadium
North	Prince William Pirates	Woodbridge, Virginia	Pittsburgh Pirates	Davis Ford Park
North	Salem Redbirds	Salem, Virginia	Texas Rangers	Salem Municipal Field
South	Durham Bulls	Durham, North Carolina	Atlanta Braves	Durham Athletic Park
South	Kinston Blue Jays	Kinston, North Carolina	Toronto Blue Jays	Grainger Stadium
South	Peninsula Pilots	Hampton, Virginia	Philadelphia Phillies	War Memorial Stadium
South	Winston-Salem Spirits	Winston-Salem, North Carolina	Boston Red Sox	Ernie Shore Field

== Map of teams ==
North division South division

== Regular season ==
=== Summary ===
- The Lynchburg Mets finished with the best record in the league for the second consecutive season.

=== Standings ===
North division
Team	Win	Loss	%	GB
Lynchburg Mets	89	49	.645	–
Prince William Pirates	75	65	.536	15
Salem Redbirds	64	74	.464	25
Hagerstown Suns	60	80	.429	30
South division
Peninsula Pilots	73	67	.521	–
Kinston Blue Jays	71	69	.507	2
Durham Bulls	68	72	.486	5
Winston-Salem Spirits	58	82	.414	15

== League Leaders ==
=== Batting leaders ===
Stat	Player	Total
AVG	Dave Magadan, Lynchburg Mets	.350
H	Bip Roberts, Prince William Pirates	150
R	Stan Jefferson, Lynchburg Mets	113
2B	Rey Quiñones, Winston-Salem Spirits	30
3B	Kash Beauchamp, Kinston Blue Jays; Stan Jefferson, Lynchburg Mets	9
HR	Randy Day, Peninsula Pilots	29
RBI	Randy Day, Peninsula Pilots	103
SB	George Crum, Salem Redbirds	61

=== Pitching leaders ===
Stat	Player	Total
W	Mitch Cook, Lynchburg Mets	16
ERA	Randy Myers, Lynchburg Mets	2.06
CG	Steve Ellsworth, Winston-Salem Spirits; Kurt Leiter, Hagerstown Suns; Randy Myers, Lynchburg Mets	7
SV	Dorley Downs, Prince William Pirates	21
SO	Mitch Cook, Lynchburg Mets	178
IP	Mitch Cook, Lynchburg Mets	184.2

== Playoffs ==
- The Lynchburg Mets won their third Carolina League championship, defeating the Durham Bulls in four games.
- The semi-finals was changed from a single game elimination to a best-of-three series.

=== Playoff bracket ===
Semi-finals
N1	Lynchburg	bye
S1	Peninsula	0
S2	Durham	2

Finals
N1	Lynchburg	3
S2	Durham	1

== Awards ==
Carolina League awards
Award name	Recipient
Most Valuable Player	Barry Lyons, Lynchburg Mets
Pitcher of the Year	Randy Myers, Lynchburg Mets
Manager of the Year	Mike Cubbage, Lynchburg Mets

== See also ==
- 1984 Major League Baseball season
