= 1983 Carolina League season =

- League: Carolina League
- Sport: Baseball
- Duration: April 12 – September 3
- Number of games: 140
- Number of teams: 8

Regular season
- Season MVP: Lenny Dykstra, Lynchburg Mets

Playoffs
- League champions: Lynchburg Mets
- Runners-up: Winston-Salem Red Sox

CL seasons
- ← 1982 1984 →

The 1983 Carolina League was a Class A baseball season played between April 12 and September 3. Eight teams played a 140-game schedule, with the winners of each half of the season competing in the playoffs.

The Lynchburg Mets won the Carolina League championship, defeating the Winston-Salem Red Sox in the final round of the playoffs.

== Teams ==
1983 Carolina League
Division	Team	City	MLB Affiliate	Stadium
North	Alexandria Dukes	Alexandria, Virginia	Pittsburgh Pirates	Municipal Stadium at Four Mile Run
North	Hagerstown Suns	Hagerstown, Maryland	Baltimore Orioles	Municipal Stadium
North	Lynchburg Mets	Lynchburg, Virginia	New York Mets	City Stadium
North	Salem Redbirds	Salem, Virginia	San Diego Padres	Salem Municipal Field
South	Durham Bulls	Durham, North Carolina	Atlanta Braves	Durham Athletic Park
South	Kinston Blue Jays	Kinston, North Carolina	Toronto Blue Jays	Grainger Stadium
South	Peninsula Pilots	Hampton, Virginia	Philadelphia Phillies	War Memorial Stadium
South	Winston-Salem Red Sox	Winston-Salem, North Carolina	Boston Red Sox	Ernie Shore Field

== Map of teams ==
North division South division

== Regular season ==
=== Summary ===
- The Lynchburg Mets finished with the best record in the league for the first time since 1977.

=== Standings ===
North division
Team	Win	Loss	%	GB
Lynchburg Mets	96	43	.691	–
Hagerstown Suns	84	52	.618	10.5
Alexandria Dukes	69	68	.504	26
Salem Redbirds	50	89	.360	46
South division
Winston-Salem Red Sox	74	66	.529	–
Kinston Blue Jays	62	76	.449	11
Durham Bulls	59	78	.431	13.5
Peninsula Pilots	58	80	.420	15

== League Leaders ==
=== Batting leaders ===
Stat	Player	Total
AVG	Lenny Dykstra, Lynchburg Mets	.358
H	Lenny Dykstra, Lynchburg Mets	188
R	Lenny Dykstra, Lynchburg Mets	132
2B	Ron Salcedo, Hagerstown Suns	39
3B	Lenny Dykstra, Lynchburg Mets	14
HR	Ken Gerhart, Hagerstown Suns	31
RBI	Dave Cochrane, Lynchburg Mets	102
SB	Lenny Dykstra, Lynchburg Mets	105

=== Pitching leaders ===
Stat	Player	Total
W	Dwight Gooden, Lynchburg Mets	19
ERA	Dwight Gooden, Lynchburg Mets	2.50
CG	Mitch Johnson, Winston-Salem Red Sox	14
SV	Rocky Childress, Peninsula Pilots	16
SO	Dwight Gooden, Lynchburg Mets	300
IP	Mitch Johnson, Winston-Salem Red Sox	214.0

== Playoffs ==
- The Lynchburg Mets won their second Carolina League championship, defeating the Winston-Salem Red Sox in three games.

=== Playoff bracket ===
Finals
N1	Lynchburg	3
S1	Winston-Salem	0

== Awards ==
Carolina League awards
Award name	Recipient
Most Valuable Player	Lenny Dykstra, Lynchburg Mets
Pitcher of the Year	Dwight Gooden, Lynchburg Mets
Manager of the Year	Sam Perlozzo, Lynchburg Mets

== See also ==
- 1983 Major League Baseball season
