= 1985 Carolina League season =

- League: Carolina League
- Sport: Baseball
- Duration: April 11 – August 31
- Number of games: 140
- Number of teams: 8

Regular season
- Season MVP: Shawn Abner, Lynchburg Mets

Playoffs
- League champions: Winston-Salem Spirits
- Runners-up: Lynchburg Mets

CL seasons
- ← 1984 1986 →

The 1985 Carolina League was a Class A baseball season played between April 11 and August 31. Eight teams played a 140-game schedule, with the winners of each half of the season competing in the playoffs.

The Winston-Salem Spirits won the Carolina League championship, defeating the Lynchburg Mets in the final round of the playoffs.

== Team changes ==
- The Winston-Salem Spirits ended their affiliation with the Boston Red Sox and begin a new affiliation with the Chicago Cubs.

== Teams ==
1985 Carolina League
Division	Team	City	MLB Affiliate	Stadium
North	Hagerstown Suns	Hagerstown, Maryland	Baltimore Orioles	Municipal Stadium
North	Lynchburg Mets	Lynchburg, Virginia	New York Mets	City Stadium
North	Prince William Pirates	Woodbridge, Virginia	Pittsburgh Pirates	Davis Ford Park
North	Salem Redbirds	Salem, Virginia	Texas Rangers	Salem Municipal Field
South	Durham Bulls	Durham, North Carolina	Atlanta Braves	Durham Athletic Park
South	Kinston Blue Jays	Kinston, North Carolina	Toronto Blue Jays	Grainger Stadium
South	Peninsula Pilots	Hampton, Virginia	Philadelphia Phillies	War Memorial Stadium
South	Winston-Salem Spirits	Winston-Salem, North Carolina	Chicago Cubs	Ernie Shore Field

== Map of teams ==
North division South division

== Regular season ==
=== Summary ===
- The Lynchburg Mets finished with the best record in the league for the third consecutive season.
- Despite finishing with the best record in the South Division, the Peninsula Pilots failed to qualify for the post-season as they did not have the best record in the division in either half of the season.

=== Standings ===
North division
Team	Win	Loss	%	GB
Lynchburg Mets	95	45	.679	–
Salem Redbirds	72	65	.526	21.5
Hagerstown Suns	65	72	.474	28.5
Prince William Pirates	65	74	.468	29.5
South division
Peninsula Pilots	67	68	.496	–
Durham Bulls	66	74	.471	3.5
Kinston Blue Jays	64	73	.467	4
Winston-Salem Spirits	58	81	.417	11

== League Leaders ==
=== Batting leaders ===
Stat	Player	Total
AVG	Dave Martinez, Winston-Salem Spirits	.342
H	Shawn Abner, Lynchburg Mets	163
R	Kevin Bootay, Salem Redbirds; Jose Leiva, Peninsula Pilots	73
2B	Shawn Abner, Lynchburg Mets	30
3B	Shawn Abner, Lynchburg Mets	11
HR	Jim Dickerson, Winston-Salem Spirits	28
RBI	Shawn Abner, Lynchburg Mets	89
SB	Eric Yelding, Kinston Blue Jays	62

=== Pitching leaders ===
Stat	Player	Total
W	Kyle Hartshorn, Lynchburg Mets	17
ERA	Kyle Hartshorn, Lynchburg Mets	1.69
CG	Carl Hamilton, Winston-Salem Spirits	11
SV	Todd Frohwirth, Peninsula Pilots	18
SO	Eric Bell, Hagerstown Suns	162
IP	Rick Knapp, Salem Redbirds	180.0

== Playoffs ==
- The Winston-Salem Spirits won their seventh Carolina League championship, defeating the Lynchburg Mets in four games.

=== Playoff bracket ===
Semi-finals
N1	Lynchburg	bye
S1	Kinston	0
S2	Winston-Salem	2

Finals
N1	Lynchburg	1
S2	Winston-Salem	3

== Awards ==
Carolina League awards
Award name	Recipient
Most Valuable Player	Shawn Abner, Lynchburg Mets
Pitcher of the Year	Kyle Hartshorn, Lynchburg Mets
Manager of the Year	Grady Little, Kinston Blue Jays

== See also ==
- 1985 Major League Baseball season
