= 1978 Carolina League season =

- League: Carolina League
- Sport: Baseball
- Duration: April 14 – September 2
- Number of games: 140
- Number of teams: 6

Regular season
- Season MVP: Ozzie Virgil Jr., Peninsula Pilots

Playoffs
- League champions: Lynchburg Mets
- Runners-up: Peninsula Pilots

CL seasons
- ← 1977 1979 →

The 1978 Carolina League was a Class A baseball season played between April 14 and September 2. Six teams played a 140-game schedule, with the top team in each half of the season competing for the championship.

The Lynchburg Mets won the Carolina League championship, as they defeated the Peninsula Pilots in the final round of the post-season.

== Team changes ==
- The Alexandria Dukes joined the league as an expansion team.
- The Kinston Eagles joined the league as an expansion team.

== Teams ==
1978 Carolina League
Team	City	MLB Affiliate	Stadium
Alexandria Dukes	Alexandria, Virginia	None	Municipal Stadium at Four Mile Run
Kinston Eagles	Kinston, North Carolina	None	Grainger Stadium
Lynchburg Mets	Lynchburg, Virginia	New York Mets	City Stadium
Peninsula Pilots	Hampton, Virginia	Philadelphia Phillies	War Memorial Stadium
Salem Pirates	Salem, Virginia	Pittsburgh Pirates	Salem Municipal Field
Winston-Salem Red Sox	Winston-Salem, North Carolina	Boston Red Sox	Ernie Shore Field

== Map of teams ==
Carolina League teams

== Regular season ==
=== Summary ===
- The Peninsula Pilots finished with the best record in the league for the first time since 1971.

=== Standings ===
Carolina League
Team	Win	Loss	%	GB
Peninsula Pilots	90	49	.647	–
Lynchburg Mets	73	64	.533	16
Salem Pirates	72	63	.533	16
Alexandria Dukes	58	75	.436	29
Kinston Eagles	57	77	.425	30.5
Winston-Salem Red Sox	55	77	.417	31.5

== League Leaders ==
=== Batting leaders ===
Stat	Player	Total
AVG	Ron MacDonald, Lynchburg Mets	.325
H	Ron MacDonald, Lynchburg Mets	158
R	George Vukovich, Peninsula Pilots	94
2B	Ron MacDonald, Lynchburg Mets	30
3B	Wally Backman, Lynchburg Mets; Elijah Bonaparte, Peninsula Pilots; Jerry McDonald, Salem Pirates; George Vukovich, Peninsula Pilots	9
HR	Ozzie Virgil Jr., Peninsula Pilots	29
RBI	Ozzie Virgil Jr., Peninsula Pilots	98
SB	Mel Barrow, Kinston Eagles	55

=== Pitching leaders ===
Stat	Player	Total
W	Marty Bystrom, Peninsula Pilots; Henry Mack, Peninsula Pilots	15
ERA	José Martínez, Peninsula Pilots	2.07
CG	Marty Bystrom, Peninsula Pilots; Kevin Stephenson, Winston-Salem Red Sox	13
SV	Russell Clark, Lynchburg Mets	22
SO	Marty Bystrom, Peninsula Pilots	159
IP	Marty Bystrom, Peninsula Pilots	197.0

== Playoffs ==
- The Lynchburg Mets won their first Carolina League championship, defeating the Peninsula Pilots in three games.

=== Playoff bracket ===
Finals
1	Peninsula	0
2	Lynchburg	3

== Awards ==
Carolina League awards
Award name	Recipient
Most Valuable Player	Ozzie Virgil Jr., Peninsula Pilots
Manager of the Year	Jack Aker, Lynchburg Mets

== See also ==
- 1978 Major League Baseball season
