= 1987 Carolina League season =

- League: Carolina League
- Sport: Baseball
- Duration: April 9 – August 30
- Number of games: 140
- Number of teams: 8

Regular season
- Season MVP: Casey Webster, Kinston Indians

Playoffs
- League champions: Salem Buccaneers
- Runners-up: Kinston Indians

CL seasons
- ← 1986 1988 →

The 1987 Carolina League was a Class A baseball season played between April 9 and August 30. Eight teams played a 140-game schedule, with the winners of each half of the season competing in the playoffs.

The Salem Buccaneers won the Carolina League championship, defeating the Kinston Indians in the final round of the playoffs.

== Team changes ==
- The Kinston Eagles began an affiliation with the Cleveland Indians. The club was renamed the Kinston Indians.
- The Prince William Pirates ended their affiliation with the Pittsburgh Pirates and began a new affiliation with the New York Yankees. The club was renamed the Prince William Yankees.
- The Salem Redbirds ended their affiliation with the Texas Rangers and began a new affiliation with the Pittsburgh Pirates. The club was renamed the Salem Buccaneers.

== Teams ==
1987 Carolina League
Division	Team	City	MLB Affiliate	Stadium
North	Hagerstown Suns	Hagerstown, Maryland	Baltimore Orioles	Municipal Stadium
North	Lynchburg Mets	Lynchburg, Virginia	New York Mets	City Stadium
North	Prince William Yankees	Woodbridge, Virginia	New York Yankees	Prince William County Stadium
North	Salem Buccaneers	Salem, Virginia	Pittsburgh Pirates	Salem Municipal Field
South	Durham Bulls	Durham, North Carolina	Atlanta Braves	Durham Athletic Park
South	Kinston Indians	Kinston, North Carolina	Cleveland Indians	Grainger Stadium
South	Peninsula White Sox	Hampton, Virginia	Chicago White Sox	War Memorial Stadium
South	Winston-Salem Spirits	Winston-Salem, North Carolina	Chicago Cubs	Ernie Shore Field

== Map of teams ==
North division South division

== Regular season ==
=== Summary ===
- The Salem Buccaneers finished with the best record in the league for the first time since 1974.

=== Standings ===
North division
Team	Win	Loss	%	GB
Salem Buccaneers	80	59	.576	–
Hagerstown Suns	72	68	.514	8.5
Prince William Yankees	66	74	.471	14.5
Lynchburg Mets	63	76	.453	17
South division
Kinston Indians	75	65	.536	–
Winston-Salem Spirits	72	68	.514	3
Peninsula White Sox	66	74	.471	9
Durham Bulls	65	75	.464	10

== League Leaders ==
=== Batting leaders ===
Stat	Player	Total
AVG	Jeff Cook, Salem Buccaneers	.339
H	Tony Chance, Salem Buccaneers	167
R	Milt Harper, Kinston Indians	100
2B	Leo Gómez, Hagerstown Suns	38
3B	Tim Richardson, Hagerstown Suns	9
HR	Hensley Meulens, Prince William Yankees	28
RBI	Casey Webster, Kinston Indians	111
SB	Ced Landrum, Winston-Salem Spirits	79

=== Pitching leaders ===
Stat	Player	Total
W	Dave Miller, Durham Bulls	15
ERA	Blaine Beatty, Hagerstown Suns	2.52
CG	Bill Copp, Salem Buccaneers; Andy Ghelfi, Kinston Indians; Dave Miller, Durham Bulls	8
SV	Kevin Renz, Peninsula White Sox	20
SO	Dave Miller, Durham Bulls	155
IP	Dave Miller, Durham Bulls	205.1

== Playoffs ==
- The Salem Buccaneers won their third Carolina League championship, defeating the Kinston Indians in four games.

=== Playoff bracket ===
Semi-finals
N1	Salem	2
N2	Hagerstown	0
S1	Kinston	2
S2	Winston-Salem	0

Finals
N1	Salem	3
S1	Kinston	1

== Awards ==
Carolina League awards
Award name	Recipient
Most Valuable Player	Casey Webster, Kinston Indians
Pitcher of the Year	Blaine Beatty, Hagerstown Suns
Manager of the Year	Mike Hargrove, Kinston Indians

== See also ==
- 1987 Major League Baseball season
