= Mickey Bowers =

American baseball player and manager

Allen LaGrant "Mickey" Bowers (born February 27, 1949, at Maxton, North Carolina) is an American retired professional baseball player, scout, coach and manager whose entire uniformed career took place in minor league baseball. An outfielder, Bowers threw and batted right-handed, stood 5 feet 11 inches (1.80 m) tall and weighed 175 pounds (79 kg).

Bowers graduated from Mount Vernon High School in Mount Vernon, Virginia and attended Northern Virginia Community College. He entered professional baseball in 1968 in the Philadelphia Phillies' organization.

One of Bowers' career highlights came in his first game as a professional in the Short Season-A Northern League. On July 4, 1968, the 19-year-old Bowers crashed through the right field fence as he chased a foul fly ball while playing for the Huron Phillies in the first game of a doubleheader against the Duluth-Superior Dukes at Memorial Park Stadium in Huron, South Dakota. He emerged from the hole in the fence uninjured, but he didn't make the catch. Bowers was reported to be "startled, none the worse for his experience."

In his finest season, 1969, the 20-year-old Bowers batted .308 with 124 hits, 10 home runs, 73 runs batted in, 74 runs scored and 29 stolen bases in 106 games played for the Spartanburg Phillies of the Class A Western Carolinas League, leading Spartanburg in all those offensive categories. But after that season, Spartanburg manager Bob Malkmus filed this evaluation with the major-league Phillies: "This boy must be held in check and learn to take orders. I have written him a personal letter telling him very bluntly what we expect. Richie Allen, his attitude and his conduct, is his idol. I'm not going to condone putting this organization through another such era with this young player. ... He's an individual type player and when some one (sic) crosses him, he doesn't hold back. Will fight for his rights."

Bowers played one more season in the Phillies organization, with the Peninsula Astros of the Carolina League in 1970. The 21-year-old led Peninsula with 127 hits in 126 games and was third on the team with 44 RBIs and a .272 batting average, finishing the season with a 12-game hitting streak and 20 hits over his last 47 at-bats. Bowers was released by the Phillies after the season. He then served six years as a police officer in Washington, D.C., before returning to baseball as a member of the Major League Baseball Scouting Bureau.

In 1977, Bowers became a coach in the Seattle Mariners' farm system at age 28. In 1978, while coaching with the Alexandria Dukes, an unaffiliated team in the Carolina League, Bowers was put into the lineup against the Winston-Salem Red Sox on Sept. 2, in the last game of the season. The 29-year-old Bowers had not played since 1970, but had two hits in three at-bats and made "a sensational first-inning catch off the wall that robbed Winston-Salem's Rick Parr of a double. ... His antics earned him a standing ovation from the crowd of 1,577."

After two seasons (1980–81) as a coach with the Lynn Sailors of the Double-A Eastern League, Bowers managed the 1982 Sailors to an 82–57 mark and the North Division title. He was named Eastern League Manager of the Year in September 1982, the first Black man chosen as Manager of the Year in professional baseball. (In 1989, Frank Robinson was the first Black man chosen as Major League Manager of Year.) Bowers' players included future major leaguers Alvin Davis, Jim Presley, Harold Reynolds, Spike Owen and Jerry Don Gleaton.

Seattle moved its Double-A affiliate to the Chattanooga Lookouts of the Southern League in 1983. Bowers was fired as manager on May 30 after the Lookouts went 20–32 over the first two months of the season. He was replaced by Bill Haywood, the Mariners' assistant director of player development. Bowers and Haywood had clashed during spring training in 1982. The Lookouts finished at 68-75 despite contributions from future major leaguers Ivan Calderón, Darnell Coles, Mark Langston and Danny Tartabull.

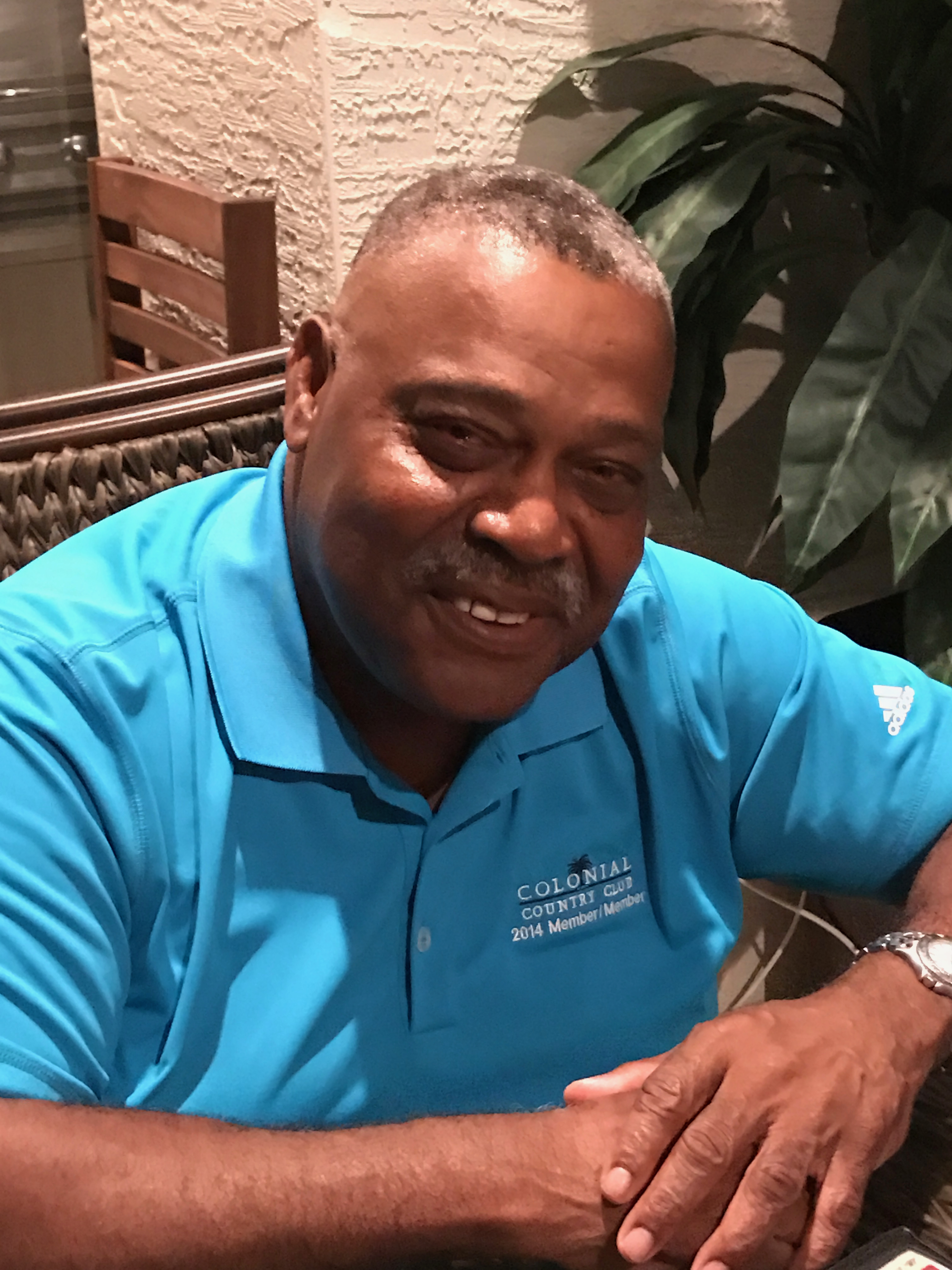
Mickey on January 3, 2017, in Fort Myers, Florida

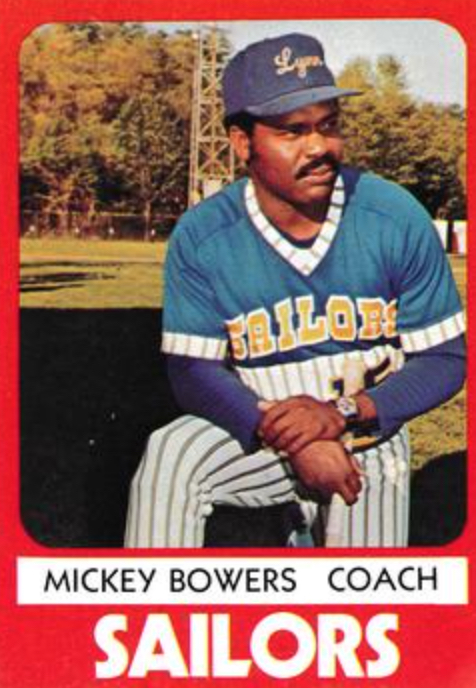
Mickey as coach of the Lynn Sailors
