= Bobby Floyd (baseball) =

American baseball player (born 1943)

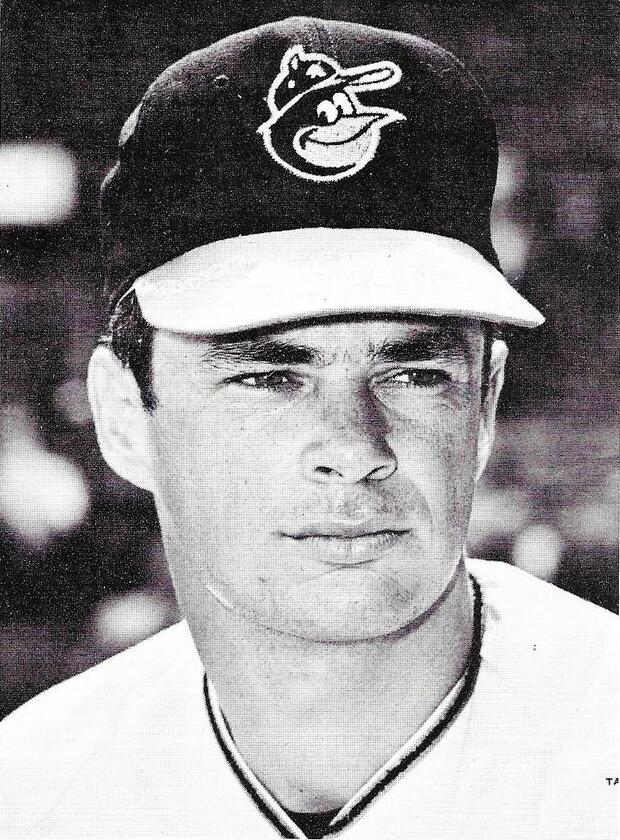
- Floyd with the Orioles in the 1960s
- Infielder
- Born: October 20, 1943 (age 82); Hawthorne, California, U.S.
- Batted: Right Threw: Right

MLB debut
- September 18, 1968, for the Baltimore Orioles

Last MLB appearance
- June 24, 1974, for the Kansas City Royals

MLB statistics
- Batting average: .219
- Home runs: 0
- Runs batted in: 26
- Stats at Baseball Reference

Teams
- Baltimore Orioles (1968–1970); Kansas City Royals (1970–1974)

Robert Nathan Floyd (born October 20, 1943) is an American former Major League Baseball infielder. After his playing days ended, Floyd became a manager in Minor league baseball, and spent the next 30 years coaching. In 2001 and 2004, he was a major league coach with the New York Mets.

== Early years ==
On top of playing shortstop for the Southern California champion El Segundo High School baseball team, Floyd also quarterbacked El Segundo's football team his senior year. After two years at UCLA on a baseball scholarship, Floyd signed with the Baltimore Orioles as an amateur free agent in August 1963.

Over five seasons in the Orioles' farm system, Floyd batted .259 with nineteen home runs and 252 runs batted in. He received his first call up to the majors in September 1968. He went 1-for-9 (a double) with an RBI on a sacrifice fly.

== Baltimore Orioles ==
Though he spent most of his minor league career at shortstop, Floyd made the Orioles' 1969 opening day roster as a back-up infielder, receiving playing time at second and third as well. Floyd batted .219 with seven runs and just one RBI, also coming on a sac fly.

The Orioles won a franchise best 109 games to capture the American League East by nineteen games over the Detroit Tigers. While Floyd was on the post season roster, he did not appear in the 1969 American League Championship Series or the 1969 World Series.

The 1970 Orioles' bullpen struggled early in the season. With Gold glover Mark Belanger firmly entrenched at short, the Orioles had little use for a light hitting middle infielder. Floyd was traded from the Orioles to the Kansas City Royals for Moe Drabowsky before the trade deadline on June 15, 1970.

== Kansas City Royals ==
Floyd went 0-for-10 in a brief trial before being demoted to the Triple-A Omaha Royals. Before the demotion, he collected his first RBI of the season on a ground out.

He batted .292 with two home runs and 32 RBIs at Omaha to earn a return to the majors that September. In his first game back, Floyd got his first two hits of the season, and had a three-RBI game against the Chicago White Sox. The next day, he went 3-for-7 in a doubleheader with the ChiSox. His sixth inning single off Wilbur Wood in the second game drove in the tying and winning runs.

Floyd remained the club's regular shortstop over the remainder of the season. Albeit, with just eleven games left. In this short trial, Floyd batted .424 with eight RBIs and four runs scored.

During the off season, the Royals traded incumbent shortstop Jackie Hernandez to the Pittsburgh Pirates in a six player deal that netted the Royals shortstop Freddie Patek, whom they intended to use as their everyday shortstop. Floyd began the 1971 season in Omaha, but received a call to the majors in late June. He batted .118 Through July, and was optioned back down. He again received a call up when rosters expanded in September, but batted only .163.

A stomach disorder suffered by Patek in spring training landed Floyd starting shortstop duties to start the 1972 season. In nine games, Floyd batted .138 with two RBIs and one run scored, and committed two errors in 39 chances on the field. Once Patek was ready to return, Floyd was demoted to Omaha. He came back up in late June, and batted .190 with three RBIs and eight runs over the rest of the season.

== Managerial career ==
Floyd joined the Seattle Mariners organization coaching in the minor leagues in 1977. The Bellingham Mariners would win the Northwest League Championship in 1977 under Floyd. He remained with Seattle until 1986, when he left to manage the Kingsport Mets of the Appalachian League. Under his management, Kingsport won the 1988 Appalachian League Championship. He served on the MLB coaching staff for the Mets in 2001 and 2004. In 2002 and 2003, he served as the manager of the Norfolk Tides. As of 2019, he still served as a senior advisor with the New York Mets organization.

Sporting positions
Preceded by first manager	Bellingham Mariners Manager; 1977	Succeeded by Bob Didier
Preceded by Mike Stubbins	Stockton Ports Manager; 1978	Succeeded by Lee Sigman
Preceded by only season	Alexandria Mariners Manager; 1978	Succeeded by only season
Preceded by first manager	Lynn Sailors Manager; 1980–1981	Succeeded by Mickey Bowers
Preceded by Moose Stubing	Salt Lake City Gulls Manager; 1982–1984	Succeeded by last manager
Preceded by first manager	Calgary Cannons Manager; 1985	Succeeded by Bill Plummer
Preceded by Chuck Hiller	Kingsport Mets Manager; 1987–1988	Succeeded by Jim Eschen
Preceded by John Stearns	New York Mets Bench Coach; 2001	Succeeded by Tom Robson
Preceded by John Gibbons	Tidewater Tides Manager; 2002–2003	Succeeded by John Stearns
Preceded by Don Baylor	New York Mets Bench Coach; 2004	Succeeded by Sandy Alomar Sr.
Preceded by Gary Carter; Juan López	Gulf Coast League Mets Manager; 2006; 2008	Succeeded by Juan López; Julio Franco
