= Jerry Reed (baseball) =

American baseball player (born 1955)

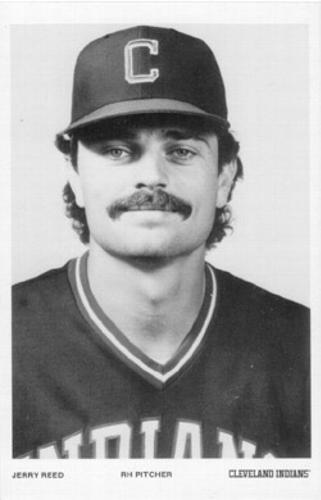
- Pitcher
- Born: October 8, 1955 (age 70); Bryson City, North Carolina, U.S.
- Batted: Right Threw: Right

MLB debut
- September 11, 1981, for the Philadelphia Phillies

Last MLB appearance
- August 8, 1990, for the Boston Red Sox

MLB statistics
- Win–loss record: 20–19
- Earned run average: 3.94
- Strikeouts: 248
- Stats at Baseball Reference

Teams
- Philadelphia Phillies (1981–1982); Cleveland Indians (1982–1983, 1985); Seattle Mariners (1986–1990); Boston Red Sox (1990)

Jerry Maxwell Reed (born October 8, 1955), is an American former professional baseball pitcher. He pitched for nine seasons in Major League Baseball (MLB) from 1981 to 1990.

== Career ==
=== Pre-MLB career ===
Reed was originally drafted out of Enka High School in Candler, North Carolina, by the Minnesota Twins. He was chosen in the 11th round of the 1973 MLB draft, but did not sign, instead opting to attend Western Carolina University (WCU), where he threw the first no-hitter in the school's history. He had a 10–0 record in 1977 for the Catamounts. He was inducted into the WCU Athletics Hall of Fame in 1994.

After four years at WCU, Reed was again drafted by the Philadelphia Phillies in the 22nd round of the 1977 MLB draft. He played the next four seasons in the minors before earning a September call-up in 1981.

=== Philadelphia Phillies ===
Reed pitched just 4 1/3 innings in 4 games in the majors in 1981. He pitched another 7 games for the Phillies in 1982, then was traded in September to the Cleveland Indians with prospects Wil Culmer and Roy Smith for pitcher John Denny to boost the Phillies' September stretch run, which fell three games short of the division-winning St. Louis Cardinals.

=== Cleveland Indians ===
Reed pitched in six games after joining Cleveland in 1982, then seven games in 1983. He returned to the minors for the entire 1984 season. In 1985, he spent most of the year in the major leagues for the first time, pitching in 33 games (including 5 starts). He had an with an ERA of 4.11 in 72 1/3 innings. He was released during spring training in 1986.

=== Seattle Mariners ===
Reed signed with Seattle Mariners on April 11, 1986, starting the season back in the minors, but he would return to the majors, going 4–0 in 11 games. He would then spend the next three full seasons pitching out of the Mariners' bullpen. 1987 was his best season, when Reed had a 3.42 ERA in 39 games, with 7 saves. Reed was released on April 25, 1990.

=== Later career ===
The Boston Red Sox were the next team to pick up Reed, but his ERA had ballooned to 4.80, and he was released in August. After the season, he made his way to the Senior Professional Baseball Association, where he pitched in 4 games for the St. Petersburg Pelicans before the league folded, and Reed's professional baseball career ended along with it.

Reed pitched in 238 major league games, all but 12 in relief, with a record of 20–19 and 18 saves.
