= Down East Bird Dawgs =

Frontier League baseball team in North Carolina, United States

- Founded in 2025; Kinston, North Carolina

Minor league affiliations
- Class: Independent (2025–present)
- League: National Association of Professional Baseball (2025–present)
- Conference: Atlantic Conference
- Division: East Division

Minor league titles
- League titles: none

Team data
- Name: Down East Bird Dawgs
- Colors: Navy, orange, tan, white
- Ballpark: Grainger Stadium (2025–present)
- Owner/ Operator: Cameron McRae
- President: Cameron McRae
- General manager: Shari Massengill
- Manager: Brett Wellman
- Media: HomeTeam Network
- Website: downeastbirddawgs.com

The Down East Bird Dawgs (colloquially known as the Dawgs) are a professional baseball team based in Kinston, North Carolina. The Bird Dawgs compete in the National Association of Professional Baseball (NAPB) as a member of the East Division of the Atlantic Conference. The team plays its home games at Grainger Stadium.

The franchise was formed in 2025 following the folding of the Down East Wood Ducks. The Wood Ducks played eight seasons at Grainger Stadium as the Single-A affiliate of the Texas Rangers in the Carolina League, winning the Carolina League title in 2017 during their inaugural season, and making the playoffs four times: 2017, 2019, 2021 and 2023. In 2023, the Texas Rangers sold the Wood Ducks to Diamond Baseball Holdings, which owns and operates many minor league baseball teams across the United States. The team moved to Fifth Third Park in Spartanburg, South Carolina, and was renamed to the Hub City Spartanburgers, playing in the South Atlantic League starting at the 2025 season.

== History ==
On September 17, 2024, Cameron McRae, a business owner from North Carolina, bought the new franchise and became the primary owner of the team. McRae has been a part of Kinston baseball for over 30 years. His other business ventures include ownership and operation of 72 Bojangles' Famous Chicken restaurants, a golf course, a convenience store, and many different management companies.

A few days later, Shari Massengill was announced as the team's general manager. Like McRae, Shari has been associated with professional baseball in North Carolina and the Kinston ballclub since the 1990s. She then served as the assistant general manager of the Gwinnett Stripers, the Triple-A affiliate of the Atlanta Braves for nearly a decade.

Grainger Stadium will serve as the home of the Bird Dawgs starting at the 2025 season. First opened in 1949, Grainger Stadium has hosted professional and collegiate baseball for over 75 years and remains one of the oldest and most historic ballparks in professional baseball. The stadium also hosts the annual Freedom Classic series between Navy and Air Force.

On November 3, 2024, Brett Wellman was hired as the Bird Dawgs' field manager. Wellman, a North Carolina native, played three seasons (2014–16) as a catcher in the Toronto Blue Jays organization. Prior to his professional career, Wellman played two seasons at Shelton State Community College in Tuscaloosa, Alabama before transferring to Auburn University at Montgomery for his junior and senior seasons. In 2017, Wellman served as a minor league coach for the Double-A Chattanooga baseball team. The coaching staff team was then completed following the transaction of T.J. White announced as the team's hitting coach on November 5, and Reggie Harris as their pitching coach on December 3.

On January 8, 2025, the Bird Dawgs announced their first 11 players signings in their roster for the 2025 season.

== Season-by-season records ==
| Season | W-L record | Win % | Finish | Playoffs |
|---|---|---|---|---|
| 2025 | 37–58 | .389 | 3rd in Atlantic Conference | Did not qualify |
| 2026 | 48–54 | .471 | 4th in East Division | Did not qualify |
| Totals | 85–112 | .430 | —N/a | —N/a |

== Current roster ==
Down East Bird Dawgs roster
| Active roster | | Coaching staff |
|---|---|---|
| Pitchers: -- Axel Andueza; -- Andrew Baker; -- Danny Beal; -- Nate Boyle; -- TJ Czyz; -- Drew Durst; -- Don Goodes; -- Zach Grace; -- Drew Henderson; -- Spencer Johnston; -- Brandon Kaminer; -- Jacob King; -- Stan King; -- Nate Lamb; -- Ian Lawson; -- Greg Martinez; -- Carter Raffield; -- Anthony Silvas | Catchers: -- Tyler Blaum; -- Gehrig Ebel; -- Manny Jackson; -- Elias Stevens; Infielders: -- Kam Guidry; -- Jelani Hamer; -- Trotter Harlan; -- Joe Johnson; -- Yeniel Laboy; -- Trey Law; -- Yassel Pino; -- Jaylen Smith; -- Emmanuel Tapia; Outfielders: -- Stephen DiTomaso; -- Brandon Fields; -- Cole Hill; -- Ali LaPread; -- Cameron Masterman | Manager: -- Brett Wellman; Coaches: -- Reggie Harris (pitching); -- TJ White (hitting); Disabled list; ‡ Inactive list; § Suspended list; updated April 28, 2025 Transactions |
