= Reggie Harris =

American baseball player and coach (born 1968)

Down East Bird Dawgs
- Pitcher / Coach
- Born: August 12, 1968 (age 57); Waynesboro, Virginia, U.S.
- Batted: Right Threw: Right

MLB debut
- July 4, 1990, for the Oakland Athletics

Last MLB appearance
- August 15, 1999, for the Milwaukee Brewers

MLB statistics
- Win–loss record: 2–3
- Earned run average: 4.91
- Strikeouts: 95

CPBL statistics
- Win–loss record: 3–5
- Earned run average: 3.00
- Strikeouts: 32
- Stats at Baseball Reference

Teams
- Oakland Athletics (1990–1991); Wei Chuan Dragons (1995); Boston Red Sox (1996); Philadelphia Phillies (1997); Houston Astros (1998); Milwaukee Brewers (1999)

Reginald Allen Harris (born August 12, 1968) is an American professional baseball coach and former pitcher who is currently the pitching coach for the Down East Bird Dawgs of the Frontier League. He played in Major League Baseball (MLB) for the Oakland Athletics (1990–91), Boston Red Sox (1996), Philadelphia Phillies (1997), Houston Astros (1998), and Milwaukee Brewers (1999). He was drafted in the first round (26th overall) in the 1987 Major League Baseball draft. Listed at 6 feet 1 inch (1.85 m), 180 pounds (82 kg), Harris batted and threw right-handed.

Harris graduated from Waynesboro High School in Waynesboro, Virginia.

In a six-season career, Harris posted a 2–3 record with a 4.91 earned run average in 86 appearances, including 95 strikeouts, 81 walks, 28 games finished, and 121.0 innings of work. He was not credited with a save.

In 2015, Harris was hired as pitching coach for the Sussex County Miners but left the team in early July. As of 2018, he served as the pitching coach of the indy league Chicago Dogs.

In 2021, Harris was hired as pitching coach for the Gastonia Honey Hunters of the Atlantic League of Professional Baseball. He returned for the 2022 season.

In 2023, Harris moved to the Staten Island FerryHawks of the Atlantic League of Professional Baseball to serve as their pitching coach.

Prior to the 2025 season, Harris was named pitching coach of the Down East Bird Dawgs of the Frontier League.
