= Marcus Lawton =

American baseball player (born 1965)

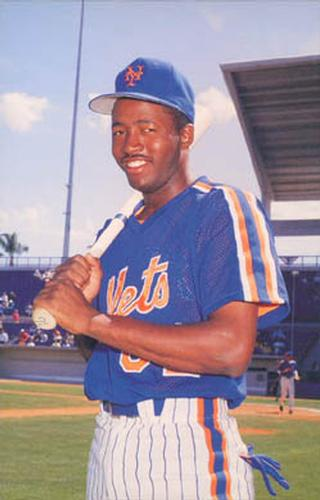
- Outfielder
- Born: August 18, 1965 (age 60); Gulfport, Mississippi, U.S.
- Batted: Switch Threw: Right

MLB debut
- August 11, 1989, for the New York Yankees

Last MLB appearance
- October 1, 1989, for the New York Yankees

MLB statistics
- Batting average: .214
- Home runs: 0
- Runs batted in: 0
- Stats at Baseball Reference

Teams
- New York Yankees (1989)

Marcus Dwayne Lawton (born August 18, 1965) is an American former professional baseball outfielder. He was born on August 18, 1965, in Gulfport, Mississippi. Drafted by the New York Mets in 1983. he played in 10 career games with the New York Yankees of the Major League Baseball (MLB) in 1989, compiling 3 hits in 14 at-bats. He played his final game on October 1, 1989. His younger brother, Matt Lawton, also played in the majors.
