= Wil Culmer =

American baseball player (1957–2003)

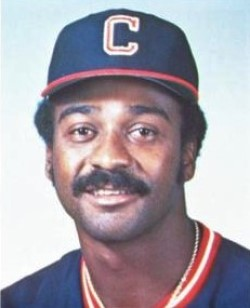
- Outfielder
- Born: November 11, 1957; Nassau, The Bahamas
- Died: October 14, 2003 (aged 45); Nassau, The Bahamas
- Batted: Right Threw: Right

MLB debut
- April 12, 1983, for the Cleveland Indians

Last MLB appearance
- May 1, 1983, for the Cleveland Indians

MLB statistics
- Batting average: .105
- At bats: 19
- Hits: 2
- Stats at Baseball Reference

Teams
- Cleveland Indians (1983)

Wilfred Hillard Culmer (November 11, 1957 – October 14, 2003) was a Bahamian Major League Baseball player for the Cleveland Indians. He was inducted to the Bahamas Sports Hall of Fame in 2011.

== Career ==
Culmer originally played baseball in the Bahamas after graduating high school, and was considered to be one of the country's best home run hitters. He was signed by the Philadelphia Phillies in 1977 as an amateur free agent and began his professional career the following year with the rookie-league Helena Phillies; he had a batting average of .358 in 55 games. The following year, he split the season between the Spartanburg Phillies and the Peninsula Pilots. In 1980, Culmer spent the season with Peninsula and had a career year. He had a .369 batting average and 184 hits, both of which led the Carolina League. He also had 18 home runs, 93 runs batted in, and 26 stolen bases; he was added to the Phillies' 40-man roster after the season as a result.

In 1981, he spent the season with the Reading Phillies, and had a .282 average in 120 games, but where were still questions about his fielding ability. Jayson Stark noted that "he can be as good as he wants to be" but was making too many fundamental mistakes in the minors for his natural talent to transfer. Culmer spent 1982 with the Oklahoma City 89ers, and had a .288 batting average and 14 home runs in 119 games. After the season, he was traded to the Cleveland Indians with Jerry Reed and Roy Smith for John Denny.

Culmer made the Indians roster out of spring training, and in his debut on April 12 got two hits in three at-bats. He played in six more games after his debut but did not get any more hits, and was demoted to the Charleston Charlies, where he had a .245 batting average in 87 games. After a 1984 season that was split between the Buffalo Bisons and Maine Guides, Culmer retired and returned to the Bahamas until his death in 2003.
