= Gerry Davis (outfielder) =

American baseball player (born 1958)

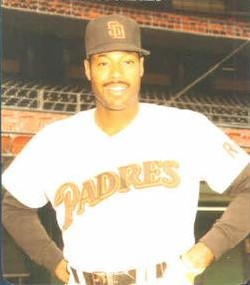
- Outfielder
- Born: December 25, 1958 (age 67); Trenton, New Jersey, U.S.
- Batted: Right Threw: Right

MLB debut
- September 20, 1983, for the San Diego Padres

Last MLB appearance
- October 6, 1985, for the San Diego Padres

MLB statistics
- Batting average: .301
- Home runs: 0
- Runs batted in: 3
- Stats at Baseball Reference

Teams
- San Diego Padres (1983, 1985)

Gerald Edward Davis (born December 25, 1958) is an American former Major League Baseball outfielder who appeared in 49 games over parts of two seasons, 1983 and 1985, for the San Diego Padres. He threw and batted right-handed and was listed as 6 feet (1.8 m) tall and 185 pounds (84 kg).

== Amateur career ==
A native of Trenton, New Jersey, Davis graduated from Ewing High School and Howard University. In 1978, he played collegiate summer baseball with the Harwich Mariners of the Cape Cod Baseball League and was named a league all-star. He was drafted by the Padres in the sixth round of the 1980 Major League Baseball draft.

== Professional career ==
Davis' professional career extended for six seasons (1980–1985 and 1987), and included strong showings in levels ranging from Class A to Triple-A. He was selected an All-Star in the Carolina League (1981) and Pacific Coast League (1983). During his two stints with the Padres, he collected 22 hits, with five doubles and a triple and three runs batted in. He batted .301. The bulk of his MLB service time came in 1985, when he got into 44 games and started seven games in right field and two games in left field. A knee injury suffered in January 1986 caused him to miss the entire 1986 season and curtailed his playing career. He retired from professional baseball after spending 1987 in the minors.
