= Marty Reed =

American baseball coach

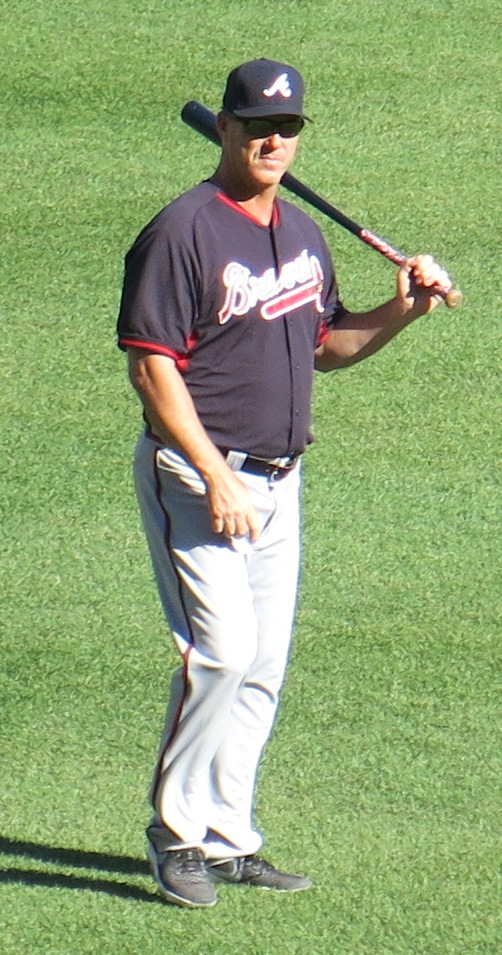
- Reed with the Braves in 2016
- Pitcher / Coach
- Born: July 22, 1961 (age 64); Boston, Massachusetts, U.S.
- Bats: Left Throws: Left
- Stats at Baseball Reference

Teams
- As Coach: Atlanta Braves (2016–2020)

Martin Edward Reed (born July 22, 1961) is an American professional baseball coach. He is a former bullpen coach for the Atlanta Braves of Major League Baseball (MLB).

== Career ==
Reed attended Hillsborough Community College and the University of Tampa. The California Angels selected him in the 14th round of the 1984 MLB draft. He played in Minor League Baseball through 1988 before retiring.

Reed served as an assistant coach at the University of Tampa from 1990 through 1996. He became the head coach of the Pfeiffer University baseball team, serving in the role through 1999. Reed then joined the Los Angeles Dodgers organization as the pitching coach for the Vero Beach Dodgers from 2000 and 2001, the Jacksonville Suns from 2002 through 2004, Vero Beach in 2005, and then as the Dodgers' minor league pitching coordinator from 2006 through 2008. In 2009, Reed joined the Braves' organization as the pitching coach for the Mississippi Braves. From 2011 through May 2016, he served as the pitching coach for the Gwinnett Braves, before he was promoted to the major leagues as the Braves' bullpen pitching coach in May 2016. Reed spent 5 years as the bullpen pitching coach for the Atlanta Braves from 2016 to 2020. During his tenure as the bullpen pitching coach, Reed was instrumental in the development of several key bullpen pitchers. Reed retired at the end of 2020.

Reed is married to Donna, whom he wed in January 1986. They have twin sons Matthew C and Martin L Reed.

Matthew was drafted out of high school in 2008 by the Los Angeles Dodgers in the 42nd round. He opt to attend the University of South Florida, where he played four years of collegiate Division I baseball from 2008 to 2012. He went on to coach at Pfeiffer University, Greensboro College, the Forest City Owls collegiate Summer League and Guilford College. Matt currently works for Perfect Game. allon/>
