= Alexandria Mariners =

- (1979); Alexandria, Virginia

Minor league affiliations
- Class: Class A-Advanced
- League: Carolina League

Major league affiliations
- Team: Seattle Mariners

Team data
- Previous names: Alexandria Dukes (1978)
- Colors: Royal blue, gold, white
- Ballpark: Municipal Stadium at Four Mile Run

The Alexandria Mariners were a minor league baseball located in Alexandria, Virginia. The Mariners were members of the Carolina League for a single season in 1979. The team was an affiliate of the Seattle Mariners.

== History ==
The Alexandria franchise joined the Carolina League in 1978. The team adopted the nickname Dukes and played the season as an independent club. The franchise was owned by shareholders with initial shares sold for $1 with a one hundred share minimum. The Alexandria Dukes signed a player development contract with the Seattle Mariners. This was Seattle's first Carolina League affiliate.

The Mariners, skippered by Bobby Floyd, had a roster that included a few future big leaguer M's. Washington native Karl Best and battery mate Dave Valle would both go on to play in Seattle. Bryan Clark led the rotation going 14–5 on the year. Perhaps the most interesting player with the club was Gary Pellant, who played the previous season in Alexandria. On April 30, Pellant hit home runs from both sides of the plate in a single game. Pellant finished the season with a .279 average and league leading 18 home runs The Mariners finished the season at 74–62 to earn second place in the league.

Following the season there was uncertainty as to whether Alexandria would field a team in 1980. There was speculation that the team may relocate or move to the AA Southern League. Lacking a definitive plan, Seattle terminated their affiliation. Alexandria returned as part of the Carolina League. The club reverted to its previous moniker, the Dukes, playing as a co-op team.

== Ballpark ==
Municipal Stadium at Four Mile Run Park served as the Mariners home ballpark.

== Season-by-season record ==
Season	Division	Finish	Wins	Losses	Win%	Postseason	Manager	Attendance
Alexandria Mariners
1979	No divisions	2nd	74	62	.544		Bobby Floyd	34,614
