= Alexandria Dukes =

- 1978–1983; Alexandria, Virginia

Minor league affiliations
- Class: Class A (1978–1983)
- League: Carolina League (1978–1983)

Major league affiliations
- Team: Pittsburgh Pirates (1981–1983); Co-op (1980); Seattle Mariners (1979); Co-op (1978)

Minor league titles
- League titles (1): 1982
- Division titles (1): 1982
- First-half titles (1): 1982

Team data
- Name: Alexandria Dukes (1980–1983); Alexandria Mariners (1979); Alexandria Dukes (1978)
- Ballpark: Municipal Stadium at Four Mile Run (1978–1983)

The Alexandria Dukes were a Minor League Baseball team of the Class A Carolina League from 1978 to 1983. Alexandria was unable to secure a Major League Baseball affiliate for their inaugural season, and again in 1980, forcing the team to operate as a co-op franchise for those two seasons. They were affiliated with the Seattle Mariners in 1979 and the Pittsburgh Pirates from 1981 to 1983. The Dukes won their sole Carolina League championship in 1982.

== History ==
=== Inaugural season ===
Based in Alexandria, Virginia, the Dukes' home stadium was Municipal Stadium at Four Mile Run Park—a ballfield adjacent to Cora Kelly Elementary School. Because the field was the property of the Alexandria City School District, alcohol was not served at any game. Seating in the park was limited to several hundred open-air, backless bleacher seats. The Dukes finished their inaugural season in fourth place in both the first and second halves of the season, posting records of 29-37 and 29-38, respectively.

=== Alexandria Mariners ===
The Dukes' second season was more successful than the first, as the team was picked up by the Seattle Mariners as an affiliate. The team dropped the "Dukes" nickname for the Alexandria Mariners. Both halves of the season, the team finished in second place, winning more games than it lost, finishing 38-29 and 36-33. On April 30, 1979, third baseman Gary Pellant made baseball history when he hit two grand slams in one inning, one batting right-handed and the other left-handed.

=== Alexandria Dukes II ===
The 1980 campaign marked a return to a co-op management and a revival of the Dukes name – and a return to a sub-.500 winning percentage.

The following year, Alexandria was able to once again obtain major-league affiliation, signing a six-year player development contract with the Pittsburgh Pirates as the team finished in second place and fourth place, posting records of 33-34 and 29-41 in the Northern Division.

The 1982 season was the most successful season in the Dukes' six-year history. The first half of the season, Alexandria won nearly 70% of its games, winning the division with a 45-20 mark, securing a post-season appearance. After defeating the Lynchburg Mets in a one-game playoff, the Dukes swept the Durham Bulls in three games, winning their only championship.

In their final season in 1983, the Dukes posted a third place record.

=== Move to Woodbridge ===
For the 1984 season the team moved to Woodbridge in Prince William County, Virginia, with its home field at the newly constructed G. Richard Pfitzner Stadium. The team played there as the Prince William Pirates from 1984 to 1986, the Prince William Yankees from 1987 to 1988, the Prince William Cannons from 1989 to 1998, the Potomac Cannons from 1999 to 2004, and the Potomac Nationals from 2005 to 2019. The team played its last season at Pfitzner Stadium in 2019, and then moved in 2020 to Fredericksburg, Virginia, to become the Fredericksburg Nationals.

== Notable alumni ==
- Rafael Belliard (1981)
- Bobby Bonilla (1983) MLB All-Star, World Series Champion
- Tim Burke (1981) MLB All-Star
- Mike Quade (1981-1982)
- Rick Renteria (1982)
- Dave Valle (1979)

== Season-by-season ==
Year	Record	Win–loss %	Manager	Regular season finish	Playoffs
1978	58-75		Les Peden	4th place	
1979	74-62		Bobby Floyd	2nd place	
1980	54-86		Mike Toomey	7th place	
1981	62-75		Mike Toomey	8th place	
1982	80-54		Johnny Lipon	2nd place	Won 1 game playoff vs. Lynchburg Mets, 1-0; Won Championship vs. Durham Bulls, 3-0
1983	69-68	.673	Johnny Lipon	4th place	
