= Grainger Stadium =

Baseball stadium in North Carolina, United States

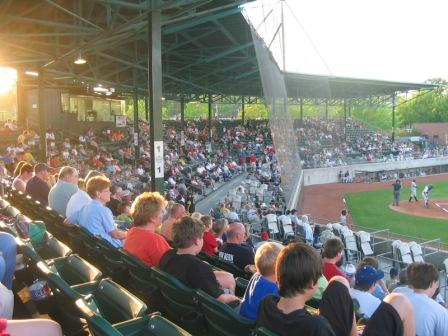

- Location within North Carolina Location within the United States
- Interactive map of Grainger Stadium
- Address: 400 East Grainger Avenue; Kinston, North Carolina; United States
- Coordinates: 35°16′12″N 77°34′27″W
- Owner: City of Kinston
- Operator: Down East Bird Dawgs
- Capacity: 5,000 (1949–1995); 4,100 (1995–2025); 3,400 (2025–present)
- Surface: Grass
- Field size: Right Field: 335 ft (102 m); Center Field: 390 ft (120 m); Left Field: 335 ft (102 m)

Construction
- Groundbreaking: September 1948
- Opened: April 21, 1949
- Cost: $170,000 ($2.3 million in 2025 dollars)
- Architects: Wooten and Rowland
- General contractor: George DuBose

Tenants
- Kinston Indians (CL) 1986–2011; Down East Wood Ducks (CL) 2017–2024; Down East Bird Dawgs (NAPB) 2025–present

Grainger Stadium is a baseball stadium located in Kinston, North Carolina. It is the home ballpark for the Down East Bird Dawgs who competes in the National Association of Professional Baseball (NAPB), as well as the annual Freedom Classic between Navy and Air Force. Grainger was previously home to the Down East Wood Ducks, the Kinston Indians and all the professional Kinston baseball teams since 1949.

== History and naming ==
The stadium is located at 400 East Grainger Avenue in Kinston. The original structure was built by architect John J. Rowland in 1949 at a cost of US$170,000 inclusive of everything except the land. Bonds were issued to raised $150,000 of the necessary money. The name Grainger comes from the donor of half of the cost of the land on which it is situated, Jesse Willis Grainger. Located on Grainger Avenue, it was initially used by Grainger High School. Grainger is a prominent old family name in Greene and Lenoir Counties.

The stadium is owned by the city and leased by the team. A dedicatory plaque identifies the structure as "Municipal Stadium", but it has been called Grainger Stadium since it was built. Ownership began referring to it as "Historic Grainger Stadium" due to its age relative to other fields in the Carolina League, as it is the second-oldest stadium in the circuit. It remains one of the oldest active ballparks in Minor League Baseball.

== Features ==
=== Playing field ===
The field itself has dimensions of 335 feet (102 m) down the left and right field lines, and 390 feet (120 m) to straightaway center field. The Grainger Stadium field has been recognized for its quality. This is largely due to the efforts of two men, Lewis B. "Mac" McAvery and Tommy Walston. McAvery was the head groundskeeper from 1949 to his death in 1979. In honor of his accomplishments, the team established an annual award in his name to be given to the individual who has done the most to "preserve and enhance" professional baseball in Kinston. Walston was the head groundskeeper until the spring of 2008. He was honored with four Carolina League Groundskeeper of the Year awards as well as the Sportsturf Manager of the Year award for all of Class A baseball in 2003. Walston is also president and founder of the Eastern North Carolina Sportsturf Association.

=== Seating and construction ===
Grainger Stadium originally had a seating capacity of 5,000, but was reduced to 4,100 in 1995. The stadium includes a covered grandstand of eight sections partially protected by netting, uncovered metal bleachers down the third base line, and several rows of uncovered seating along the first base line. There is also a picnic area with tables that have a full view of the playing field. Box seats stretch from first to third base just in front of the grandstand. With the exception of the metal bleachers, all seats in Grainger Stadium are formed plastic. The box seats are squared off sections bordered by metal railing with plastic folding chairs and have waitresses assigned to them. The closest seating is mere inches from the playing field while the furthest seats in the top row of the grandstand sit 52 feet 4 inches (15.95 m) from the action. During the days of segregation, section one of the grandstand and a now removed set of metal bleachers that sat adjacent to section one were designated for black attendees. A majority of the supporting structure is brick and steel, and steel beams cause some partially obstructed views. The roof is wooden, as is the press box. The outfield wall is made of brick with signs of various materials and a wooden batter's eye.

== Other uses ==
The facility is often used for a variety of events besides minor league baseball. In September 1979, the USSSA (slow-pitch softball) World Series was held in Grainger Stadium. The stadium hosted the Colonial Athletic Association baseball tournament from 1995 to 1999 and the Conference USA baseball tournament in 2002. Two devoted fans who met at a Kinston Indians game decided to get married at the ballpark. On September 30, 2006, Grainger Stadium was the site of the Whole Hog Blues Festival. The facility is often used for regional youth and collegiate baseball tournaments. For example, in May 2007, the ballpark was the site of the 2007 NCAA Division II South Atlantic Regional. It is currently the home of the "Freedom Classic" which is the annual baseball series between the Air Force Academy and the Naval Academy.

East Carolina University in nearby Greenville hosted an NCAA super regional in 2001 and an NCAA regional in 2004 at Kinston because the Pirates' on-campus facility, Clark-LeClair Stadium, was not up to Division I standards to host postseason tournaments at the time. Subsequent upgrades to Clark-LeClair have allowed ECU to host in Greenville.

== Renovations ==
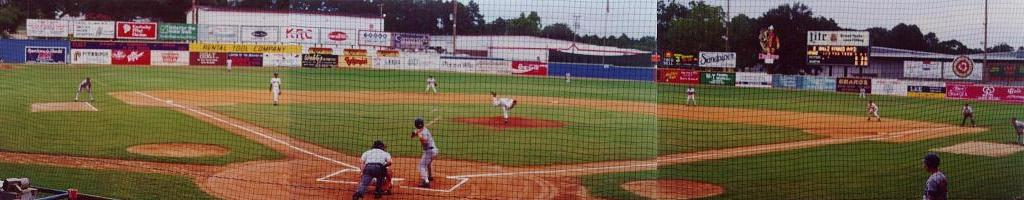
Grainger Stadium in 1991

Grainger Stadium has been renovated often through the years to maintain the facility and to try to keep it up to the standards of professional baseball. At times, these renovations have been quite extensive.

In January 2007, the Kinston-Lenoir County Tourism Development Authority approved $75,000 to help fund a new scoreboard and video board. The funds were disbursed in $15,000 increments over five years. The City of Kinston provided $175,000 in additional funds toward the project. The new boards cost an estimated $350,000. On August 10, 2016, new turf grass was put down to replace the 18-year-old surface. Other upgrades included those to the parking lot, lighting, grandstand, and outfield wall.

Additional renovations took place in 2025 in preparation for the Bird Dawgs' arrival. The main grandstand had been renovated the previous year, while the latest renovations included expanded concessions and team store, a new scoreboard, a new training facility and renovated offices. Additionally, the clubhouse were remodeled to meet Frontier League specifications. These renovations were completed prior to the 2025 Freedom Classic. Following the Freedom Classic, the third base bleachers were demolished and a new patio was built in its place in time for the Bird Dawgs' inaugural season, reducing the seating capacity to 3,400.

== Former Kinston ballparks ==
Grainger Park, 1939

- West End Park was the home field of the Eastern Carolina Baseball Association, "outlaw league" Kinston Robins and Highwaymen, and the Kinston Eagles of the Virginia League and the Kinston Eagles of the Eastern Carolina League. It was designed by local baseball figure George Suggs and constructed from 1920 to 1921. The stadium was overhauled when Kinston joined the Virginia League in 1925 as the Eagles. John McGraw's New York Giants played an exhibition game against the Eagles in this venue in the spring of 1925. West End Park was last used was 1929.
- Grainger Park was shared by the Kinston Eagles of the Coastal Plain League and the Grainger High School Red Devils who used it for both baseball and football. It was located directly behind the high school, a few hundred yards from where Grainger Stadium now sits. It was used as a minor league stadium from 1934 to 1948. Grainger Park hosted the Coastal Plain League All-Star Game in 1938. Connie Mack's Philadelphia Athletics played an exhibition game with the Eagles at the park in the spring of 1939.
