= Kiwanis Field =

Ballpark in Salem, Virginia, US

Coordinates: 37.286233°N 80.047535°W

Kiwanis Field (formerly called Municipal Field) is a ballpark in Salem, Virginia, which was opened in 1932. The ballpark has a capacity of 5,000 people and is primarily used for baseball. Kiwanis Field was the home of a Carolina League team currently known as the Salem RidgeYaks; at the time, they were the Salem Rebels (which had previously played in the Appalachian League), Salem Pirates, Salem Redbirds, and Salem Buccaneers. The Salem Avalanche played here briefly in 1995 until they moved to the Salem Memorial Baseball Stadium. The stadium has commanding views of the Blue Ridge Mountains, particularly Twelve O'clock Knob. Until the Salem Football Stadium opened in 1985, Kiwanis Field served as the home football field for Salem High School and its predecessor Andrew Lewis High School. The stadium was known as Salem Municipal Field prior to 1995. Kiwanis Field is currently used for high school, American Legion, and Roanoke College baseball games.
