= Peninsula Pilots (minor league team) =

- 1963–1992; Hampton, Virginia

Minor league affiliations
- Class: Class A (1963–1971); Class AAA (1972–1973); Class A (1974–1992)
- League: Carolina League (1963–1971); International League (1972–1973); Carolina League (1974–1992)

Major league affiliations
- Team: Washington Senators (1963); Cincinnati Reds (1964–1966); Kansas City Athletics (1967); Oakland Athletics (1968); Houston Astros (1969); Philadelphia Phillies (1970–1971); Montreal Expos (1972–1973); Philadelphia Phillies (1976 –1985); Chicago White Sox (1986–1987); Seattle Mariners (1990–1992)

Minor league titles
- League titles (4): 1971; 1977; 1980; 1992
- Conference titles: 1965

Team data
- Name: Peninsula Senators (1963); Peninsula Grays (1964–1968); Peninsula Astros (1969); Peninsula Phillies (1970–1971); Peninsula Whips (1972–1973); Peninsula Pennants (1974); Peninsula Pilots (1976–1985); Peninsula White Sox (1986; –1987); Virginia Generals (1988); Peninsula Pilots (1989–1992)
- Ballpark: War Memorial Stadium (1963–1992)

The Peninsula Pilots was a primary name of the Minor League Baseball franchise located in Hampton, Virginia from 1963–1992. The Pilots played in the Class A Carolina League.

Today, Peninsula is home to the summer collegiate baseball team who have adopted the same Peninsula Pilots moniker and are members of the Coastal Plain League.

== History ==
The Peninsula Pilots franchise began play in the Carolina League in 1963 as a Washington Senators farm team.

The franchise had many monikers, playing as the Peninsula Senators (1963), Peninsula Grays (1964–1968), Peninsula Astros (1969), Peninsula Phillies (1970–71), Peninsula Whips (1972–1973), Peninsula Pennants (1974), Peninsula Pilots (1976–1985), Peninsula White Sox (1986-1987), Virginia Generals (1988) and Peninsula Pilots (1976–1985, 1989–1992). The teams were members of the Class A Carolina League (1963–1971), Class AAA International League (1972–1973) and Class A Carolina League (1974–1992).

Peninsula teams were an affiliate of the Washington Senators (1963), Cincinnati Reds (1964–1966), Kansas City Athletics (1967), Oakland Athletics (1968), Houston Astros (1969), Philadelphia Phillies (1970–1971), Montreal Expos (1972–1973), Philadelphia Phillies (1976–1985), Chicago White Sox (1986–1987) and Seattle Mariners (1990–1992).

Baseball Hall of Fame inductees Johnny Bench (1966), Gary Carter (1973) and Satchel Paige (1966) played for Peninsula.

The 1980 team was named the 74th best Minor League team of the 20th century in a list by two noted minor league historians, Bill Weiss and Marshall Wright. The team was known as the Peninsula Senators (1963), Grays (1964–1968), Astros (1969), Phillies (1970–71), Whips (1972–1973), Pennants (1974) and White Sox in 1986–1987 while affiliated with the Chicago White Sox, and as the Virginia Generals in 1988 when they operated as an unaffiliated co-op club. They regained their original name in 1989 and major league affiliation returned in 1990 with the Seattle Mariners (1990–1992). The team's existence ended after the 1992 season when they relocated to Wilmington, Delaware and became the Wilmington Blue Rocks.

== The ballpark ==
Peninsula teams played at War Memorial Stadium (1963-1992). Built in 1948, the ballpark is still in use today and is located at 1889 West Pembroke Avenue, Hampton, Virginia, 23661. Today, War Memorial Stadium is home to the summer collegiate baseball team with the same Peninsula Pilots moniker who play in the Coastal Plain League.

War Memorial Stadium was first built by Branch Rickey for the Newport News Dodgers, who played at War Memorial from 1948-1958 as members of the Piedmont League. The ballpark has also been known as Peninsula Stadium.

== Notable Peninsula alumni ==
- Johnny Bench (1966) Inducted Baseball Hall of Fame, 1989
- Gary Carter (1973) Inducted Baseball Hall of Fame, 2003
- Satchel Paige (1966) Inducted Baseball Hall of Fame, 1971
- Bret Boone (1990) 3x MLB All-Star
- Bernie Carbo (1966)
- Cesar Cedeno (1969) 4x MLB All-Star
- Darren Daulton (1982) 3x MLB All-Star; Philadelphia Phillies Wall of Fame
- Bob Dernier (1979)
- Jim Essian (1971)
- Darrell Evans (1967) 2x MLB All-Star; 1985 AL Home Run Leader; San Francisco Giants Wall of Fame
- Ken Forsch (1969) 2x MLB All-Star
- Julio Franco (1980) 3x MLB All-Star; 1991 AL Batting Title
- Craig Grebeck (1987)
- Cliff Johnson (1969)
- Mike LaValliere (1982)
- Skip Lockwood (1968)
- Hal McRae (1966) 3x MLB All-Star; Kansas City Royals Hall of Fame
- Mike Maddux (1983)
- Steve Mingori (1965–1966)
- Jeff Nelson (1990) MLB All-Star
- Scott Radinsky (1987)
- Steve Rogers (1972) 5x MLB All-Star
- Juan Samuel (1982) 3x MLB All-Star
- Gene Tenace (1967) MLB All-Star
- Andre Thornton (1970) 2x MLB All-Star; Roberto Clemente Award (1979); Cleveland Indians Hall of Fame
- Bob Walk (1977) MLB All-Star

== Year-by-year records ==
Year	Record	Finish	Manager	Playoffs
1976	71-65	2nd	Cal Emery	none
1977	71-67	2nd	Jim Snyder	League Champs
1978	90-49	1st	Jim Snyder	Lost League Finals
1979	68-68	3rd	Ron Clark	none
1980	100-40	1st	Bill Dancy	League Champs
1981	71-65	1st	Bill Dancy	Lost League Finals
1982	90-47	1st	Bill Dancy	Lost in 1st round
1983	58-80	7th	Tony Taylor	
1984	73-67	3rd	Ron Clark	Lost in 1st round
1985	67-68	3rd	Ron Clark	
1986	60-74	5th	Bob Bailey / Duke Sims	
1987	66-74	5th (tie)	Marv Foley	
1988	41-99	8th	Joe Breeden	
1989	44-89	8th	Jim Thrift	
1990	57-83	7th	Jim Nettles	
1991	46-93	8th	Steve Smith	
1992	74-64	2nd	Marc Hill	League Champs

== See also ==
- Peninsula Pilots, an amateur baseball team in the Coastal Plain League, a collegiate summer baseball league
