= Hagerstown Owls =

- 1941–1955; Hagerstown, Maryland

Minor league affiliations
- Class: Class B (1941–1955)
- League: Piedmont League (1953–1955); Inter-State League (1941–1952)

Major league affiliations
- Team: Washington Senators (1954–1955); Milwaukee Braves (1953); Boston Braves (1950–1952); Washington Senators (1949); Detroit Tigers (1947–1948); Chicago Cubs (1945–1946); Detroit Tigers (1941–1944)

Minor league titles
- League titles (1): 1952

Team data
- Name: Hagerstown Packets (1954–1955); Hagerstown Braves (1950–1953); Hagerstown Owls (1941–1949)
- Ballpark: Municipal Stadium (1941–1955)

The Hagerstown Owls were a Minor League Baseball team based in Hagerstown, Maryland, United States. The team played in the Inter-State League (1941–1952) and the Piedmont League (1953–1955). Their home games were played in Municipal Stadium.

== History ==
After the departure of the Hagerstown Hubs in 1931, there was no professional baseball in Hagerstown. The Inter-State League began play in 1939 as a class C league with teams in Trenton, New Jersey and Sunbury, Hazleton and Allentown, Pennsylvania. The league grew to class B status with the addition of four additional teams from Wilmington, Delaware and Reading, Harrisburg and York, Pennsylvania. Professional baseball returned to Hagerstown in 1941 when Oren E. Sterling moved his Sunbury Indians franchise to town and became a Detroit Tigers affiliate. The team was named the Owls for Oren, Win, Luck and Sterling.

=== 1941–1949: Hagerstown Owls ===
The Owls did well in their first year, posting a record of 75-48 and finishing 5.5 games behind the first place Harrisburg Senators in 1941. Emil Brinsky tied for the league runs batted in (RBI) title with 104. Brinsky also led the team with 7 home runs. Batters with a .300 plus batting average for Hagerstown were Brinsky (.318), future major leaguer Turkey Tyson (.316), Roy Kennedy (.315) and future major leaguer Ferrell Anderson (.304). The dominant pitcher for Hagerstown was Anderson Bush. He led the Inter-State League in wins (20), strikeouts (170), earned run average (ERA, 1.61) and winning percentage (.833, 20–4). The Owls made the playoffs, but were eliminated in the first round by the Trenton Senators. Outfielder Brinsky and manager Dutch Dorman were selected for the 1941 Inter-State League End of Season All-Star Team.

World War II was having its impact in 1942, with the Inter-State League shrinking to 6 teams. Tyson led the team with a .291 batting average. Earl Rapp had a team leading 8 home runs. Pitcher Walter Wilson had a record of 16-8 and an ERA of 2.32 to lead the Owls. The most interesting game of the season occurred on August 24. Trenton Packers pitcher Jack Casey pitched a no-hitter against Hagerstown, but lost the game 3–2. Hagerstown finished the regular season in first place, 0.5 games ahead of the Wilmington Blue Rocks. Hagerstown defeated the Harrisburg Senators 3 games to 1 in the first round of the playoffs. However, in the league championship series, Wilmington captured the title by defeating Hagerstown 4 games to 1.

1943 was a spectacular year for returning player Bob Maier. He set an Interstate League single season record with 52 doubles. The 52 doubles were also a high for all of professional baseball in 1943. Maier also led the club with a .363 batting average. Maier would go on to be the starting third baseman for the World Series champion Detroit Tigers in 1945. Thomas Davis provided power with 16 home runs. Pitcher Charles Miller tied for the league lead with 20 wins and set the league record for innings pitched (260). Norman Shope, who split time between the Owls and the York White Roses, led the league with a 2.65 ERA. Even though Hagerstown won more games in 1943 than 1942, they missed repeating as the regular season leader in 1943, finishing 1 game behind the Lancaster Red Roses. The Owls still qualified for the postseason but were eliminated in the first round by York 3 games to 1.

The Owls slumped to fifth place in the six team league in 1944. They finished with a 65–73 record, finishing 11.5 games behind the leader Allentown Cardinals. For the first time since the club's inception, the Owls did not reach the postseason. Hank Nowak led the team with 10 home runs, while having a .341 batting average. Joe Slotter won 14 games, but set the Inter-State League record with 19 wild pitches during the season. Duke Brett's 2.94 ERA was the only one below 4.00.

The Owls affiliated with the Chicago Cubs in 1945. An even worse year was had by the Owls as they finished last, 25.5 games behind Lancaster. William Baskin was the leader of the pitching staff, with a 12–12 record and a 4.38 ERA. Frederick Danek it 7 home runs to lead the team. Charles Fitzgerald hit .370 in 63 games, while Tony Mattarazzo hit .315 in 133 games. Hank Nowak returned to the Owls with a league record-tying 22 game hitting streak.

The Hubs returned to winning form in 1946, finishing in 3rd place 10.5 games behind league leader Wilmington. The end of the war meant better times for the Inter-State League as well as it expanded from six teams to its original eight with the re-entries of the Harrisburg and Sunbury franchises. Offensively, the leaders were Tom Mattazrazzo with a .327 batting average and Charles Fitzgerald with 12 home runs. The two best pitchers for 1946 were left-handers Eddie Ancherico and Bill Stratton. Ancherico had a 16–8 record and a 3.69 ERA, while Stratton had a 14–7 record with a 3.62 ERA. The Owls qualified for the playoffs, playing in the best of seven game format that had been adopted by the Inter-State League in 1944. In a close series, Wilmington defeated Hagerstown 4 games to 3.

For the 1947 season, the Hubs re-affiliated with the Detroit Tigers. Third baseman Richard Dresser's .317 batting average and overall play were good enough to earn him a sport on the 1947 Inter-State League end of season All-Star team. George D'addario hit 16 home runs. Bill Stratton posted another good year with a 13–9 record. Eddie Owcar had a 13–12 record, while Edward Burnstead led the staff with a 3.82 ERA. Although the Owls did not make the post-season, 65,177 fans attended the Owls home games.

The Owls' fortunes did not improve in 1948, with the Owls again finishing in next to last place, a full 30 games behind the leading team Wilmington. Attendance suffered as a result, with only 49,238 fans coming through the gate. There were three different player-managers during this season: Pep Rambert, Gene Crumling and Benny Culp. Bill Stratton's 13–11 record led the pitching staff, but he had a 5.03 ERA. Left-handed batter George D'addario was the offensive leader with a .325 batting average and 12 home runs. Several former and future major leaguers were on the roster this season. In addition to player-managers Rambert, Crumling and Culp, the other players were Boots Poffenberger, Cal Ermer, Hal Keller, Barney Schultz and Babe Birrer.

The nadir of this era of Hagerstown minor league baseball came in 1949. The Detroit Tigers ended their affiliation with the team and a new one-year affiliation deal was signed with the Washington Senators. The team finished in last place, losing 89 games and drawing only 34,762 fans. Hal Keller's .322 batting average was the best on the team. An indication of the poor performance of this team was that Keller and two other players (James Kelly and Charlie Hiden) led the team with only 4 home runs each during the season. A bright spot in an otherwise dismal season was the performance of pitchers Eddie Ancherico and Gene Major. Anchirico had a 6–13 record with a 2.83 ERA, while Major had an even better 2.71 ERA off a 12–16 record. This marked Gene Crumling's last year with the team. The former major league player spent seven seasons with the Owls. The most interesting game of the season came on September 3. The Owls played a 23-inning marathon against the York White Roses, losing by a 3–2 score. The game stands as the longest in Inter-State League history as well as the longest at Municipal Stadium. The game was originally part of a scheduled double header; for obvious reasons the second game was postponed.

=== 1950–1953: Hagerstown Braves ===
The 1950 season brought many changes. Gene Raney purchased the team from Oren Sterling. Raney affiliated the team with the Boston Braves and renamed the Hagerstown team the Braves. Attendance increased to 84,350. The team's on-field performance changed as well. Hagerstown welcomed back former manager Dutch Dorman. The Braves finished in second behind Wilmington during the regular season. Outfielder Jesse Levan topped the league in batting average (.334) and tied for the lead in runs (171). Al Bennett had a noteworthy year as a pitcher, winning 15 games with an ERA of 3.21. Both Levan and Bennett were selected to the Inter-State League End of Season All-Star Team for 1950. History was made on June 24 in Hagerstown with the first minor league appearance of future Hall of Famer Willie Mays, who was playing for the Trenton Giants. Appearing in the post-season for the first time since 1946, the Braves won the first round of the playoffs, defeating the Giants 3 games to 1. In the championship series the Braves were defeated by the Wilmington Blue Rocks 4 games to 1.

Attendance at all minor league games began to drop in as major league baseball was televised coast to coast and in color for the first time in 1951. Also, the Korean War began to impact Americans' lives. The Braves' attendance fell to 67,452, even though the Braves finished the regular season in first place. Two Hagerstown hitters led the league in batting average (Billy Smith, .373) and RBIs (Pete Perini, 91). Perini's 14 home runs was topped by Louis Tufano's 17. Anderson Bush returned to Hagerstown in 1951 after a decade's absence and had another spectacular season. With a record of 22–3, he set the league record of an .880 winning percentage. Even though Bush had the two memorable seasons at Hagerstown, he never made it to the major leagues. Outfielder Smith and pitcher Bush were selected for the 1951 Inter-State League End of Season All-Star Team. In the first round of the playoffs, the Braves were defeated by the Wilmington Blue Rocks 4 games to 1. This marked the fourth time in ten seasons that the Blue Rocks had eliminated Hagerstown.

The 1952 season would prove to be the last for the Inter-State League. However, it was the best season for the Braves as they won the championship. Robert Jaderland led the league with 113 runs scored, while Clarence Riddle had a league-topping 93 RBIs. Riddle also led the team with 14 home runs. Pitcher Bob Giggie tied for the league lead in wins with 18, while leading the Hagerstown staff with a 2.82 ERA. First baseman Riddle, pitcher Giggie and outfielder Joseph Christian made the 1952 Inter-State League End of Season All-Star Team. The Braves owned a 6-game lead over the Allentown Cardinals at the end of the regular season. Hagerstown swept the York White Roses 4 games to 0 in the first round of the playoffs. In the championship series, Hagerstown triumphed over the Lancaster Red Roses 4 games to 2.

After the collapse of the Inter-State League, the Hagerstown Braves and the York White Roses joined the Piedmont League for the 1953 season (two other former Inter-State League teams, the Lancaster Red Roses and the Sunbury Redlegs, would join the Piedmont League in 1954 and 1955, respectively). James Zinn and Joe Blake collected 119 and 117 hits respectively to lead the team, while Theodore Laguna collected 9 home runs. Thomas Horton had the lowest ERA at 2.12, while Jack Larson won 13 games. Third baseman Blake, catcher Laguna and pitcher Horton were named to the 1953 Piedmont League End of Season All-Star Team. 1953 would be the last season that Dutch Dorman would be involved in managing the team. During each of his six seasons with the team, Hagerstown qualified for the playoffs. The Braves finished the regular season in second place 2.5 games behind the Norfolk Tars. In the first round of the playoffs, the Newport News Dodgers swept the Braves 4 games to none.

=== 1954–1955: Hagerstown Packets ===
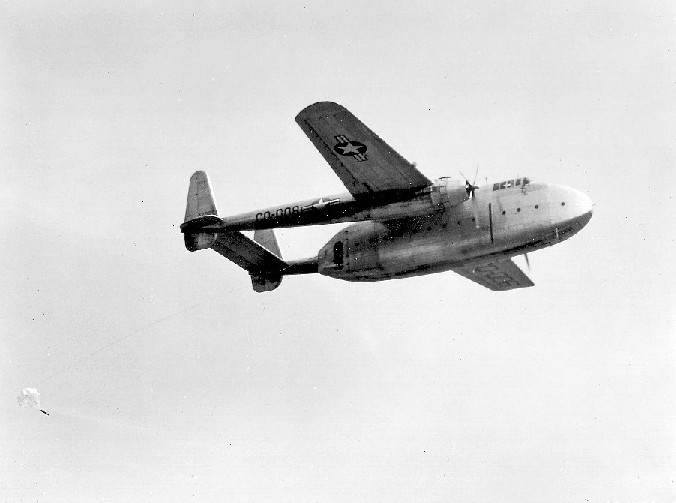
The Fairchild C-82 Packet military transport aircraft, which inspired the adoption of the team name Packets.

Hagerstown re-affiliated themselves with the Washington Senators and named themselves the Packets for the 1954 season. The name was a reference to the Fairchild C-82 Packet military transport aircraft built in Hagerstown during the 1940s. Al Bennett had an outstanding season, leading the Piedmont League with an ERA of 2.35 and 162 strikeouts. Bennett was selected to the 1954 Piedmont League End of Season All-Star Team. Antonio Garcia tied Bennett for the most team wins with 14. Wayne Crawford had a .331 batting average in 139 games, while Crawford "Miff" Davidson slugged 23 home runs to lead the Packets. The youngest player on the team was 19-year-old pitcher Pedro Ramos. He only had a 4–2 record in 13 appearances for Hagerstown. However, he would go to the major leagues in 1955 and eventually become a major league all-star in 1959. The Packets finished in fifth place with a 65–74 record, missing the playoffs by 5 games.

The last season for the Packets and the Piedmont League came in 1955. In response to declining attendance, the Packets offered 1955 season tickets to 70 home games for ten dollars plus one dollar tax. Miff Davidson led the Piedmont League in its final season with 103 runs scored and 164 hits. Davidson also pounded 30 home runs while accumulating a .338 batting average, leading the team in both categories. Davidson was selected as the Owls' Most Valuable Player (MVP) in 1955, repeating from the previous year. Davidson was the only player to have repeated as team MVP. Bobby Lee Brown's 15 wins led the team, as did his 192 innings pitched and 3.33 ERA. Hagerstown finished in sixth place, 16 games behind the first place Newport News Dodgers. Even though he hit only .256 in 1955, another notable player was Bob Allison. The two-time Major League All-Star would help found the Bob Allison Ataxia Research Center at the University of Minnesota in 1990. On February 20, 1956, the Packets and the Piedmont League went out of existence.

== Aftermath ==
Hagerstown was without a professional team until 1981 when Lou Eliopulos began the era of Hagerstown Suns baseball. The Baltimore Orioles affiliate competed in the Carolina League, winning the league championship in its inaugural season. The affiliation between a Washington major league franchise and a Hagerstown minor league franchise that ended in 1955 with the Packets' dissolution was re-established in 2007 when the Hagerstown Suns began an affiliation with the Washington Nationals.

== Major League alumni ==
Hagerstown players from this era who were major leaguers are listed below. Players in bold were Major League All Stars.

- Ferrell Anderson: 1941
- Gene Crumling: 1941, 1942, 1943, 1946, 1947, 1948, 1949
- Carl McNabb: 1941, 1942
- Turkey Tyson: 1941, 1942
- Bob Maier: 1942, 1943
- Earl Rapp: 1942
- Walter Wilson: 1942
- Eddie Phillips: 1943
- Duke Brett: 1944
- Ed Mierkowicz: 1944
- Milt Welch: 1944
- Bob Alexander: 1944
- Carmen Mauro: 1945
- Dick Welteroth: 1945
- Boots Poffenberger: 1947, 1948
- Barney Schultz: 1947, 1948
- Babe Birrer: 1948
- Cal Ermer: 1948
- Hal Keller: 1948, 1949
- Pep Rambert: 1948
- Woody Wheaton: 1949
- Jesse Levan: 1950
- Mike Krsnich: 1951
- Bob Giggie: 1952
- Earl Hersh: 1953
- Paul Campbell: 1954
- Pedro Ramos: 1954
- Bob Allison: 1955
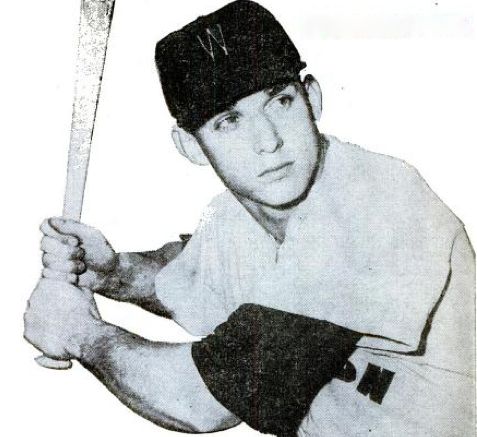
Bob Allison in 1959.

== Inter-State League season records ==
Hagerstown holds several Interstate League season individual season records.

- Doubles: 52, Bob Maier (1943)
- Innings pitched: 260, Charles Miler (1943)
- At bats: 593, Robert Mays (1943)
- Wild Pitches: 19, Joseph Slotter (1944)
- Consecutive Game Hitting Streak: 22, Edward Nowak (1945) (tied with 2 others)
- Winning Percentage: .880 (22–3), Anderson Bush (1951)

== Team season-by-season records ==
Hagerstown season-by-season records
Season	Nickname	League	Affiliation	Record	Finish	Games behind	Manager(s)	Postseason
1941	Owls	Inter-State	Detroit Tigers	75-48	2nd	5.5	Dutch Dorman	Lost to Trenton 3–0 in first round
1942	Owls	Inter-State	Detroit Tigers	80-57	1st	–	Dutch Dorman	Defeated Harrisburg in first round 3–1; Lost to Wilmington 3–1 in finals
1943	Owls	Inter-State	Detroit Tigers	83-57	2nd	1	Eddie Phillips; Bob Maier	Lost to York 3–1 in first round
1944	Owls	Inter-State	Detroit Tigers	65-73	5th	11.5	Herb Brett	Did not qualify
1945	Owls	Inter-State	Chicago Cubs	61-77	6th	25.5	Mickey Balla; Dutch Dorman	Did not qualify
1946	Owls	Inter-State	Chicago Cubs	74-65	3rd	10.5	John "Bunny" Griffiths	Lost to Wilmington 4–3 in first round
1947	Owls	Inter-State	Detroit Tigers	62-75	7th	25.5	John "Bunny" Griffiths	Did not qualify
1948	Owls	Inter-State	Detroit Tigers	53-87	7th	30	Pep Rambert; Gene Crumling; Benny Culp	Did not qualify
1949	Owls	Inter-State	Washington Senators	49-89	8th	37.5	Woody Wheaton	Did not qualify
1950	Braves	Inter-State	Boston Braves	75-60	2nd	5.5	Dutch Dorman	Defeated Trenton 4–1 in first round Lost to Wilmington 4–1 in championship
1951	Braves	Inter-State	Boston Braves	94-46	1st	–	Dutch Dorman	Lost to Wilmington 4–1 in first round
1952	Braves	Inter-State	Boston Braves	85-48	1st	–	Dutch Dorman	Defeated York 4–0 in first round Defeated Lancaster 4–2 in championship
1953	Braves	Piedmont	Milwaukee Braves	78-53	2nd	2.5	Dutch Dorman; Jimmy Zinn; Billy Jurges	Lost to Newport News 4–0 in first round
1954	Packets	Piedmont	Washington Senators	66-74	5th	21	Paul Campbell; Zeke Bonura	Did not qualify
1955	Packets	Piedmont	Washington Senators	58-65	6th	16	Johnny Welaj	Did not qualify

== Hagerstown Inter-State League / Piedmont League season leaders ==
Hagerstown Inter-State / Piedmont League season leaders
Year	Name	Category	Number
1941	Brinsky, Emil	Runs batted in	104
1941	Bush, Anderson	Wins	20
1941	Bush, Anderson	Strikeouts	171
1941	Bush, Anderson	Earned run average	1.61
1941	Bush, Anderson	Winning Percentage	.833 (20–4)
1943	Miller, Charles	Wins	20 (tied with two others)
1950	Levan, Jesse	Batting Average	.334
1950	Levan, Jesse	Runs scored	171 (tied with one other)
1951	Bush, Anderson	Winning Percentage	.880 (22–3)
1952	Jaderland, Robert	Runs scored	113
1952	Riddle, Clarence	Runs batted in	93
1952	Giggie, Robert	Wins	18 (tied with two others)
1954	Bennett, Al	Strikeouts	162
1954	Bennett, Al	Earned run average	2.35
1955	Davidson, Crawford	Runs scored	103
1955	Davidson, Crawford	Hits	164

== See also ==
- Hagerstown Suns
- Hagerstown Hubs
- Sunbury Indians
- Municipal Stadium (Hagerstown)
- Interstate League
- Piedmont League
