= Coatesville (minor league baseball) =

Coatesville (baseball)
- 1904–1908; (1904–1905, 1908); Coatesville, Pennsylvania

Minor league affiliations
- Class: Independent (1904–1905, 1908)
- League: Pennsylvania League (1904); Tri-State League (1905); Pennsylvania-New Jersey League (1908)

Major league affiliations
- Team: None

Minor league titles
- League titles (0): None

Team data
- Name: Coatesville (1904–1905, 1908)
- Ballpark: Unknown (1904–1905, 1908)

The Coatesville team was a minor league baseball team based in Coatesville, Pennsylvania. The "Coatesville" minor league teams played as members of the 1904 Pennsylvania League, 1905 Tri-State League and 1908 Pennsylvania-New Jersey League and were without a known team nickname, common in the era.

== History ==
In 1904, the Coatesville team began minor league play as members of the Independent level Pennsylvania League.

The 1904 Pennsylvania League was a six–team league. Joining Coatesville in the Pennsylvania League were the teams based in Carlisle, Pennsylvania, Chester, Pennsylvania, Johnstown, Pennsylvania (Johnstown Johnnies), Oxford, Pennsylvania and Pottstown, Pennsylvania. While rosters exist, the team records and statistics of the 1904 Pennsylvania League are unknown.

The 1905 Coatesville team continued play as charter members of the Tri-State League, which was an eight–team Independent league. The Coatesville franchise moved to Shamokin, Pennsylvania during the 1905 season. In August 1905, Coatesville relocated to Shamokin after playing some home games in Reading, Pennsylvania. The 1905 Coatesville/Shamokin team finished with a 56–69 record to place fifth in the Tri-State League standings. The team was managed by Percy Stetler and finished 12.5 games behind the first place Williamsport Millionaires in the final standings. The Coatesville/Shamokin and the Lebanon Dutch Peaches teams did not return to play in 1906, as the Tri–State League reduced to six teams.

The 1908 Coatesville team returned to play as the team became members of the Independent level Pennsylvania-New Jersey League. The 1908 Pennsylvania–New Jersey League played as a six–team Independent league. The Coatesville team was joined in the Pennsylvania–New Jersey League by franchises based in Allentown, Pennsylvania, Chester, Pennsylvania, Newark, New Jersey, Trenton, New Jersey and York, Pennsylvania.

Beginning play on April 30, 1908, Coatesville finished fourth in the Pennsylvania-New Jersey League final standings. In the final standings, Chester (8–3–1) and Trenton Tigers (7–2–1) ended in a tie for first place, with Trenton having a higher win percentage. Allentown (6–3–2), Coatesville (5–6–2), York (5–7–0) and Newark (0–10–0) followed in the standings.

The Pennsylvania-New Jersey League permanently folded after the 1908 season. Coatesville, Pennsylvania has not hosted another minor league team.

== The ballpark ==
The name of the Coatesville home minor league ballpark is not known.

== Timeline ==
Year(s)	# Yrs.	Team	Level	League
1904	1	Coatesville	Independent	Pennsylvania League
1905	1	Coatesville	Independent	Tri-State League
1908	1	Coatesville	Independent	Pennsylvania-New Jersey League

== Year–by–year records ==
Year	Record	Finish	Manager	Playoffs/Notes
1904	00–00	NA	Unknown	League records unknown
1905	56–69	5th	Percy Stetler	Relocated to Shamokin in August
1908	5–6–2	4th	Unknown	No playoffs held

== Notable alumni ==
- Harry Arndt (1905)
- Chub Aubrey (1905)
- John Brackenridge (1905)
- Herbert Jackson (1905)
- Swat McCabe (1905)
- Doc Reisling (1905)
- Bud Sharpe (1905)
- Shag Shaughnessy (1905)
- Jack Slattery (1905)
- Joe Ward (1905)
- Dave Williams (1905)
- Eddie Zimmerman (1905)

=== See also ===
- Coatesville/Shamokin players
