= Sunbury Indians =

- 1939–1940; Sunbury, Pennsylvania

Minor league affiliations
- Class: Class B (1940); Class C (1939)
- League: Interstate League (1939–1940)

Major league affiliations
- Team: Unaffiliated

Team data
- Name: Sunbury Indians (1940); Sunbury Senators (1939)
- Ballpark: Meredith Park (1939–1940)

The Sunbury Indians were a minor league baseball team based in Sunbury, Pennsylvania. They began play in the Interstate League in 1939 as the Sunbury Senators and were renamed the Sunbury Indians in 1940. Despite the nicknames, they were unaffiliated with any major league baseball team. They played at Meredith Park. The team relocated to Hagerstown, Maryland, after the 1940 season as the Hagerstown Owls.

== Early Baseball in Sunbury ==
Professional baseball started in Sunbury the late nineteenth century. Sunbury fielded professional teams in the Central Pennsylvania League in 1887 and from 1896 to 1898. Another Sunbury team was part of the Atlantic League in 1909.

== Oren Sterling ==
In 1931, banker and factory owner Oren Sterling owned and managed the Mifflinburg, Pennsylvania Senators, part of the Lower Circuit of the semi-professional West Branch League. He succeeded in getting his team to the league championship series in 1931 and 1933. In 1934, the Senators moved to the semi-professional Central Pennsylvania League, playing an exhibition game that year against the Williamsport Grays of the professional Class-A New York–Pennsylvania League. The Senators won the Central Pennsylvania League championship in 1935, 1936, and 1937.

In 1938, Sterling received permission to move his team from Mifflinburg to Sunbury. This was due to the poor support his team had received in Mifflinburg. Sterling moved virtually the entire physical structure of the park from Mifflenburg to Sunbury to construct Meredith Field. His players initially continued to use the same shirts they wore in Mifflinburg by wearing them inside out to hide the "Mifflinburg" embroidery. However, the Sunbury fans were not very happy with this arrangement. Sterling's Senators won the Central Pennsylvania League championship in 1938 as well. Sterling was a major proponent of the creation of the fully professional Class C Interstate League in 1939 and his club became one of its charter members.

== 1939 season ==
The dominant player in 1939 for the Senators was David Kelly. He had a .404 batting average while leading the league in home runs and runs batted in. Even with this impressive performance, Kelly played only one more season in professional baseball. The pitching staff was led by right-hander Joseph Kleskie (14 wins to 13 losses, 3.13 earned run average (ERA), 187 innings pitched (IP)) and left-hander Jacob Yaros (11 wins to 7 losses, 4.44 ERA, 144.0 IP). First baseman Kelly and shortstop Michael Shimko were named to the 1939 Interstate League End of Season All-Star Team. The Sunbury team qualified for the league championship by beating the Trenton team (also named the Senators) in a one-game playoff. In the Interstate League championship, Sunbury gained a 3 games to 1 lead in the series over the Allentown Fleetwings. However, they lost the next three games to lose the series 4 games to 3.

=== Exhibition against Homestead Grays ===
On August 21, 1939, before the championship series with Allentown, the Senators hosted the Negro National League's Homestead Grays. The Grays hit six home runs, including two by Josh Gibson, in a 19-8 victory.

== 1940 season ==
With the expansion of the Interstate League from four to eight teams, the league was able to move up in classification from C to B. The Sunbury franchise renamed itself the Indians, in part to avoid confusion with the Trenton team. Carl McNabb led the team with 20 home runs. John Kramer had a .338 batting average for the Indians. Don Kepler had a record of 13 wins and 8 losses in 200 IP, while Harold Cheney led the staff with a 3.70 ERA in 175 IP. The Indians did not fare well in 1940. The low point of the season came on July 17. Oren Sterling fired the field manager, Bill Kerstetter, and the business manager, Charles Sterling (Oren's uncle), after the team went on strike during a game at Allentown over the player allowance for food while on road trips. The team was in last place at the time. The new field manager, Dutch Dorman, managed to improve the team's standing from eighth place to sixth place, but they still finished 15 games behind the first place Reading Chicks. As a team Sunbury led the league with a .288 batting average; however, their fielding percentage was next to last at .952 with 216 total errors. Even though the overall season was disappointing, there were a couple of highlights. Harold Nerino had a 22-game hitting streak, setting the Interstate League mark (later tied by two others). On July 2, 1940, Kepler threw the Interstate League's first no-hitter, winning 6-0 in a seven inning game against the York Bees.

== Major League player ==
Carl McNabb was the only player from the 1939–1940 Sunbury teams to make an appearance in major league baseball. He was a pinch hitter in one game for the Detroit Tigers on April 20, 1945.

== Move to Hagerstown ==
In February 1941, Sterling announced the move of the Sunbury franchise to Hagerstown, Maryland. While the team was not losing money, Hagerstown's population was larger than Sunbury's population (32,411 to 15,422). The small capacity of the ballpark was also cited as a factor for the move. The club was renamed the Owls (for Oren, Win, Luck, and Sterling).

== Aftermath ==
With the advent of World War II, Sunbury would not have a professional team again until 1946. This new team, the Sunbury Yankees, was also part of the Interstate League. Hosting the Sunbury Reds (1948–1949), Sunbury Athletics (1950), and Sunbury Giants (1951–1952), Sunbury continued to field a team in the Interstate League until the league folded after the 1952 season. In 1955, another Sunbury team, the Sunbury Redlegs, played in the Piedmont League, joining the former Interstate League teams from Hagerstown, York and Lancaster. With the collapse of the Piedmont League before the 1956 season, Sunbury would never field another professional baseball team.

Several players made the move to Hagerstown including Carl McNabb, Harold Cheney, John Kramer, and player-manager Dutch Dorman. During each of the six seasons that Dorman managed the team, Hagerstown qualified for the Interstate League playoffs. The Hagerstown team played in the Interstate League through the 1952 season and with the Piedmont League for the 1953, 1954, and 1955 seasons.

The Owls were owned by Oren Sterling until 1950, when he sold the team to Eugene Raney. After selling the team, Sterling returned to Mifflinburg, where he operated an antique business until he died on January 16, 1960, at the age of 70.

The facility used by the Senators and Indians, Meredith Field, was never used again for professional baseball. The lights used at Meredith Field were bought by the city of Hagerstown and moved to Municipal Stadium. The 1946 Sunbury Yankees used the new Sunbury Memorial Field, as did the other Sunbury teams through the 1955 season.

== Season-by-season record ==
Season	Nickname	Classification	Manager	Record	Finish	Games Behind	Attendance	Postseason
1939	Senators	C	Bill Kerstetter	51-51	2nd (tie)	3	20,000	Defeated Trenton in one game playoff for 2nd place Lost to Allentown 4-3 in league championship
1940	Indians	B	Bill Kerstetter; Fred "Dutch" Dorman	58-64	6th	15	36,000	Did not qualify

== Interstate League All-Stars ==
- First baseman: David Kelly (1939)
- Shortstop: Michael Shimko (1939)

== Interstate League season records ==
The 1939–1940 Sunbury teams hold one Interstate League season individual season record.

- Hitting streak: 22, Harold Nerino (1940) (tied with two others)

== Interstate League season leaders ==
- Runs batted in: 86, David Kelly (1939)
- Runs batted in: 96, Harold Nerino (1940), tied with one other
- Home runs: 14, David Kelly (1939)

== See also ==
- Hagerstown Owls
- Interstate League
