= Keystone Association =

Five–team independent level baseball minor league

- Classification: Independent (1884–1885)
- Sport: Minor League Baseball
- First season: 1884
- Folded: 1885
- President: Thomas Hargreaves (1884–1885)
- No. of teams: 5
- Country: United States of America
- Most titles: 1 Lancaster Red Stockings (1884)
- Related competitions: Eastern League (1884); Pennsylvania State League (1883)

The Keystone Association was a five–team independent level baseball minor league that played in the 1884 and 1885 seasons. The Keystone Association featured franchises based exclusively in Pennsylvania.

== History ==
The Keystone Association formed as Independent level minor league in 1884.

The Keystone Association was formed at a March 3, 1884 meeting in Lancaster, Pennsylvania. Carlisle, Pennsylvania and West Chester, Pennsylvania were franchises admitted to the league but never formed a team. The league adopted American Association rules. The league president was Thomas Hargreaves.

The 1884 Keystone Association played as a five–team Independent league. The Keystone Association hosted franchises based in Chambersburg, Pennsylvania, Chester, Pennsylvania, Lancaster, Pennsylvania, Littlestown, Pennsylvania and York, Pennsylvania.

The Keystone Association began play on May 2, 1884. The league then folded for the season on June 10, 1884. The League standings when the league folded were Lancaster Red Stockings (15–4), York White Roses (10–10), Chambersburg (8–10), Chester Blue Stockings (8–10) and Littlestown Brown Stockings (6–8). During the 1884 season, the Chester franchise disbanded on June 2, 1884 and Lancaster disbanded on June 7, 1884.

After the Keystone Association folded, York and Lancaster continued play, as the York White Roses and Lancaster Ironsides became members of the Eastern League for the remainder of the 1884 season. York replaced the Harrisburg Olympics after the Harrisburg, Pennsylvania based team folded. The Eastern League folded after the 1884 season.

In their final season of play, the 1885 Keystone Association returned to play and featured the same five returning franchises. Chambersburg, the Chester Blue Stockings, Lancaster Red Stockings, Littlestown Brown Stockings and York White Roses were the 1885 league members.

The 1885 Keystone Association final team standings are unknown.

The Keystone Association permanently folded after the 1885 season.

== Keystone Association teams ==
Team name(s)	City represented	Ballpark	Year active
Chambersburg Maroons	Chambersburg, Pennsylvania	Unknown	1884 to 1885
Chester Blue Stockings	Chester, Pennsylvania	Union Park	1884 to 1885
Lancaster Red Roses	Lancaster, Pennsylvania	Unknown	1884 to 1885
Littlestown Brown Stockings	Littlestown, Pennsylvania	unknown	1884 to 1885
York White Roses	York, Pennsylvania	York Athletic Club Grounds	1884 to 1885

== League standings ==
=== 1884 Keystone Association ===
Team standings	W	L	PCT	GB	Manager(s)
Lancaster Red Stockings	15	4	.789	–	Frank Diffenderfer
York White Roses	10	10	.500	5½	Frank Burnham / H.B. King
Chester Blue Stockings	8	10	.444	6½	Thomas Hargraves
Chambersburg	8	10	.444	6½	Oliver Chambers
Littlestown Brown Stockings	6	8	.429	6½	NA

=== 1885 Keystone Association ===
The exact 1885 team records and standings are unknown

Team standings	W	L	PCT	GB	Manager
Chambersburg	00	00	.000	–	NA
Chester Blue Stockings	00	00	.000	–	NA
Lancaster Red Stockings	00	00	.000	–	NA
Littlestown Brown Stockings	00	00	.000	–	NA
York White Roses	00	00	.000	–	NA

== Notable alumni ==
- Frank Berkelbach (1884), Littlestown
- Bart Cantz (1884), Chambersburg/Littlestown
- Fred Carl (1884), York
- Dick Conway (1884), York
- John Deasley (1884), Chester
- Bill Farmer (1884), Chester
- Ed Green (1884), Chambersburg/York
- Ed Greer(1884), Littlestown
- John Hiland (1884), Lancaster
- John Hofford (1884), Littlestown
- Will Holland (1884), Lancaster
- Bill Jones (1884), Chester
- Bobby Mitchell (1884), Chambersburg
- James Morris (1884), Chambersburg
- George Noftsker (1884), Chambersburg
- Ed Sales (1884), Chambersburg
- Lewis Smith (1884), York
- Mike Tiernan (1884), Chambersburg
- Charlie Waitt (1884), Lancaster
- George Wetzel (1884), Lancaster
- Henry Zeiher (1884), York

== See also ==
- Pennsylvania State Association
