= Littlestown Brown Stockings =

- 1884–1885; Littlestown, Pennsylvania

Minor league affiliations
- Class: Independent (1884–1885)
- League: Keystone Association (1884–1885)

Major league affiliations
- Team: None

Minor league titles
- League titles (0): None

Team data
- Name: Littlestown Brown Stockings (1884–1885)
- Ballpark: Unknown (1884–1885)

The Littlestown Brown Stockings were a minor league baseball team based in Littlestown, Pennsylvania. In 1884 and 1885, Littlestown played exclusively as members of the Independent level Keystone Association.

== History ==
The Keystone Association and the member teams were formed at a March 3, 1884, meeting in Lancaster, Pennsylvania. Carlisle, Pennsylvania and West Chester, Pennsylvania were franchises initially admitted to the league but never played.

The Littlestown Brown Stockings began play in 1884, as the Keystone Association played as a five–team Independent league. The charter Keystone Association franchises were based in Chambersburg, Pennsylvania, Chester, Pennsylvania, Lancaster, Pennsylvania and York, Pennsylvania.

The Littlestown Brown Stockings officially began Keystone Association play on May 2, 1884. During the 1884 season, the Chester franchise disbanded on June 2, 1884, and Lancaster disbanded on June 7, 1884, causing the rest of the league to fold. On June 10, 1884, the league folded for the season with the Brown Stockings in fifth place, 6.5 games behind first place Lancaster. The League standings when the league folded were Lancaster Red Stockings (15–4), York White Roses (10–10), Chambersburg (8–10), Chester Blue Stockings (8–10) and Littlestown Brown Stockings (6–8).

In their final season, the 1885 Littlestown Brown Stockings returned to Keystone Association play as the league featured the same five returning franchises. Chambersburg, the Chester Blue Stockings, Lancaster Red Stockings and York White Roses were the other returning 1885 league members.

The 1885 Keystone Association final team standings are unknown.

The Littlestown Brown Stockings and the Keystone Association both permanently folded after the 1885 season. Littlestown has not hosted another minor league team.

== The ballpark ==
The exact name of the Littlestown Brown Stockings' home ballpark in 1884 and 1885 is unknown.

== Timeline ==
Year(s)	# Yrs.	Team	Level	League
1884–1885	2	Littlestown Brown Stockings	Independent	Keystone Association

== Year–by–year records ==
Year	Record	Finish	Manager	Playoffs/Notes
1884	6–8	5th	NA	League folded June 10
1885	00–00	NA	NA	League records unknown

The Littlestown Brown Stockings' 1885 record is unknown.

== Notable alumni ==
- Frank Berkelbach (1884)
- Bart Cantz (1884)
- Ed Greer (1884)
- John Hofford (1884)

=== See also ===
Littlestown (minor league baseball) players
