= Municipal Stadium (Hagerstown) =

Stadium in Hagerstown, Maryland

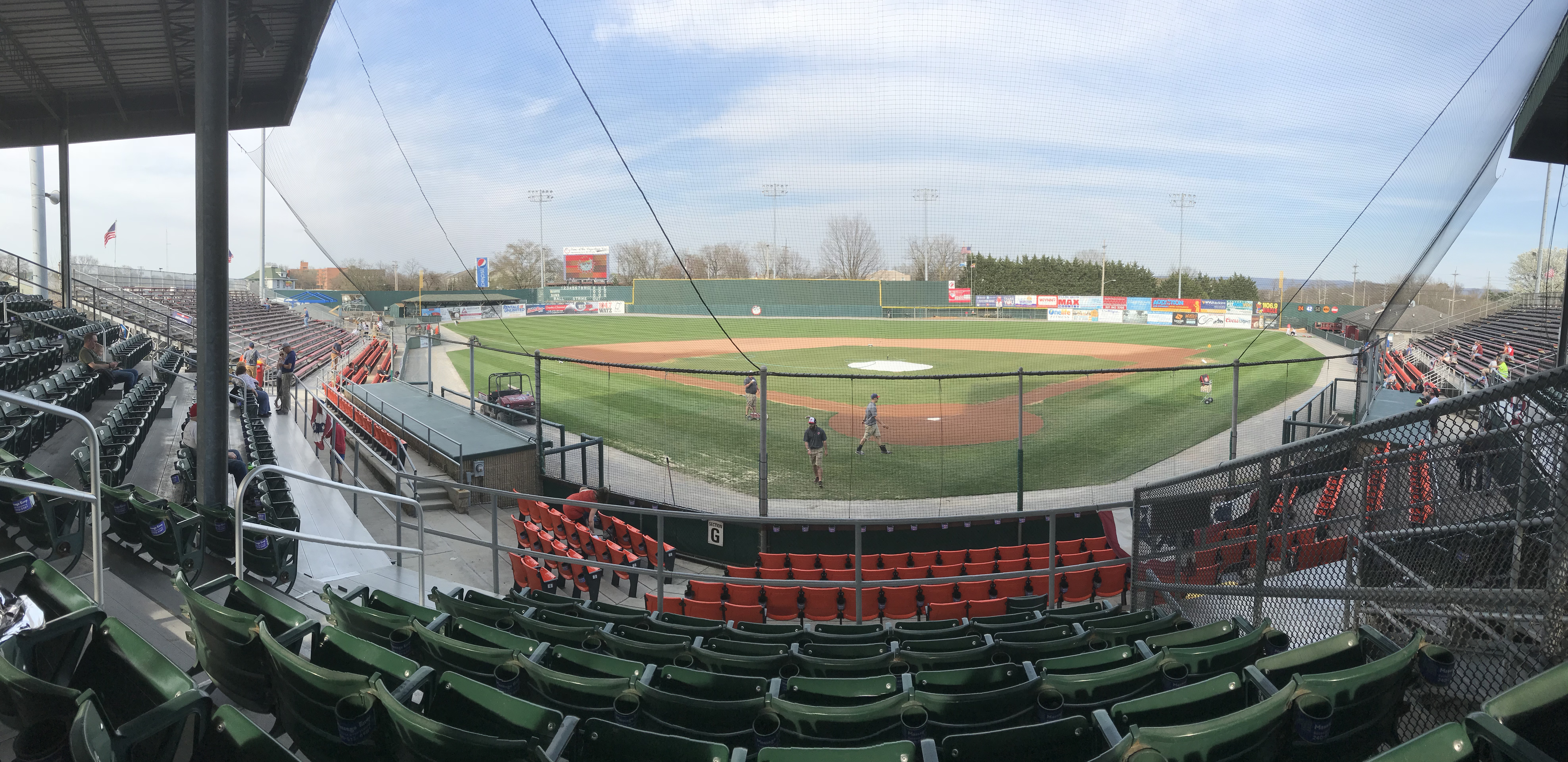

- Location within Maryland Location within the United States
- Interactive map of Municipal Stadium
- Location: 274 Memorial Boulevard East; Hagerstown, MD 21740
- Coordinates: 39°37′58″N 77°42′45″W
- Owner: City of Hagerstown
- Capacity: 4,600
- Surface: Grass
- Field size: Left Field: 335 feet Center Field: 400 feet Right Field: 330 feet

Construction
- Groundbreaking: March 13, 1930
- Opened: May 8, 1930
- Renovated: 1954, 1981, 1995
- Demolished: May 9, 2022
- Cost: $14,000 ($269,821 in 2017 dollars)
- Architect: J.B. Ferguson Company

Tenants
- Hagerstown Hubs (MAL / BRL) 1930–1931; Hagerstown Owls/Braves/Packets (PL / IL) 1941–1955; Hagerstown Suns (SAL / EL / CL) 1981–2020; Hagerstown Braves (SPL) 2021

Municipal Stadium was a stadium in Hagerstown, Maryland, United States. It was primarily used for baseball and was built in 1930 in a short time period of six weeks and had a capacity of 4,600 people. The ballpark was demolished in Spring 2022.

== History ==
From 1915 to 1929, Hagerstown's minor league team played at Willow Lane Park, where Bester Elementary School is now located. When the city made the decision to build the school, the need for a new stadium was urgent. The Field and Athletic Association was created to find land and build a stadium. The organization struck a deal with the city, leasing a tract of land for 99 years at $1 per year. Municipal Stadium was quickly built on the land in a mere six weeks, just in time for the first home game on May 8, 1930. Since then, the stadium has undergone two major renovations.

Hagerstown's Municipal Stadium hosted several games featuring Negro league teams during the first decade and a half of its existence. Among the Negro league teams that played in Hagerstown were the Indianapolis Clowns, Homestead Grays and the Pittsburgh Crawfords.

From 1941 to 1949, the Hagerstown Owls played in the Class B Interstate League and called Hagerstown's Municipal Stadium home. In 1950, the Hagerstown entry in the Class B Interstate League was sold and was renamed the Hagerstown Braves. The Hagerstown Braves remained in existence from the 1950 season through the 1953 season. The Braves won one championship with the Interstate League in 1952.

A major renovation took place in 1981, when Minor League Baseball returned to Hagerstown after a 26-year absence from the city. About $546,000 was put into the stadium overhaul, which included the installation of a public address system, stadium lights, underground electricity, and new seats and bleachers. In 1995, $500,000 worth of improvements to the stadium were made, such as the installation of new seats, and upgrading the VIP section to include cup holders. The Sunset Grille and bar area was also added at this time.

In 1990, sitting president, George H. W. Bush enjoyed a Hagerstown Suns game at Municipal Stadium. Although he later visited the Frederick Keys for two games at their stadium, the visit to the Suns game was the first presidential visit for a minor league baseball team.

In 2005, a movement arose to rename an adjacent street to honor Willie Mays, who played his first game at the park as a minor league rookie. The proposal, however, was shot down due to protests by various American war veterans groups who wanted to keep the original road name of Memorial Boulevard.

The playing surface was renovated following the 2010 season. In addition, seating improvements and the installation of a state-of-the-art video board enhanced the fans experience in 2011. In April 2014, Hagerstown and the Suns agreed to a two-season lease extension on Municipal Stadium for 2015 and 2016 which could be voided by mutual agreement.

Municipal Stadium was one of the three oldest Minor League baseball stadiums in the country when the Hagerstown Suns were disbanded in 2020.

Prior to the 2021 season, the semi-professional Hagerstown Braves (not to be confused with the former minor league team of the same name that played at Municipal Stadium in the early 1950s) announced they would return to play their 2021 season at Municipal Stadium.

=== Demolition ===
On March 24, 2022, the Hagerstown City Council voted 5–0 to proceed with the demolition of Municipal Stadium. As part of the demolition effort, more than 60 bidders attended an auction of stadium seats.

== Hagerstown Suns Hall of Fame ==
On the underside of the first-base stands was the Hagerstown Suns Hall of Fame. For each member, there was a commemorative plaque.

- Grady Little, manager for the Suns' only league championship in 1981. Inducted April 13, 2009.
- Matt Cain 35, pitcher for the Suns who later threw a perfect game for the San Francisco Giants. Inducted April 13, 2009.
- Mike Mussina 21, pitcher for the Suns who was later inducted into the Baltimore Orioles Hall of Fame. Inducted April 13, 2009.
- Vernon Wells 24, South Atlantic League All Star in 1998, three-time major league all-star, second all time in Toronto Blue Jays hits, home runs, doubles, runs, runs batted in, and total bases. Inducted April 13, 2009.
- Bryce Harper 34, youngest position player ever selected to play in a major league all-star game. Inducted August 4, 2012.
- Carol Gehr, Rawlings 2008 Woman Executive of the Year for all of Major and Minor League Baseball. Inducted August 27, 2010.
- Michael Young 3, Suns career leader in games played in a single season and seven-time major league all-star. Inducted April 8, 2010.
- Brady Anderson 9, outfielder who is one of only three major league players to hit 50 home runs and steal 50 bases in a season and a member of the Baltimore Orioles Hall of Fame. Inducted April 8, 2010.
- Jim Palmer 22, Baltimore Orioles Major League Baseball Hall of Fame pitcher who spent a week with the Hagerstown Suns on a rehabilitation assignment in 1983 also honored with a separate historical plaque. Inducted April 8, 2010.
- Brian Wilson 38, pitcher whose only three professional starts were in Hagerstown; holder of San Francisco Giants record for saves in a single season. Inducted August 6, 2011.
- Boof Bonser, South Atlantic League Pitcher of the Year and End of Season All Star for 2001. He still holds the records for Suns pitching wins (16, tied) and strikeouts per nine innings pitched (12). Inducted May 14, 2016.
- Charles Robert "Bob" Miller, general manager of the Suns from 1982 to 1994. Inducted July 14, 2017.
- Paul "Ears" McNeal, catcher for the 1955 Hagerstown Packets; coach for the Suns from 1981 to 1988. Inducted August 11, 2017.

== Municipal Stadium Wall of Fame ==
The right field wall at Municipal Stadium honored five individuals.

- 24: Honoring Willie Mays, who played his first professional game for the Trenton Giants in 1950.
- 42: Honoring Jackie Robinson, the first African-American to play Major League Baseball in the modern era. His number has been retired throughout all professional baseball.
- 50: Honoring John Henry Moss, president of the South Atlantic League for 50 years. The number 50 has been retired throughout the South Atlantic League. A separate plaque is on display at Municipal Stadium.
- Adenhart: Honoring Nick Adenhart, a major league player from Washington County, Maryland, where Hagerstown is located, who died on April 9, 2009, in a car accident.
- MRA: Mitchell Ronald Akers, a Hagerstown Suns employee who died in an accident at Municipal Stadium on April 11, 2012.

== Other Important Dates at Municipal Stadium ==
There were other important dates at Municipal Stadium.

- May 8, 1930: The Hagerstown Hubs hosted the first professional baseball game at Municipal Stadium. The Hubs defeated the Frederick Warriors 14–6 before a crowd of 1,400 fans.
- August 12, 1930: The first night game was played at Municipal Stadium pitting Hagerstown against Frederick. The American Daylight Company installed the lights in five days for a cost of $8,000 ($154,183 in 2014 dollars). A standing-room-only crowd estimated between 2,500 and 3,000 saw the Hubs defeat the Warriors 9–6.
- June 19, 1931: The Hubs defeated the Clarksburg Generals by a score of 7–2. After playing some road games, the Hubs debuted as the Parkers on June 28 in Parkersburg, West Virginia, leaving Municipal Stadium bereft of a professional baseball team.
- May 2, 1941: After a decade absence, professional baseball returned to Hagerstown and Municipal Stadium when the Hagerstown Owls played their opening home game against the Harrisburg Senators. The Owls defeated the Senators by a 9–6 score with over 2,000 fans in attendance.
- September 3, 1949: In the first game of a doubleheader, the York White Roses defeated the Hagerstown Owls by a 3–2 score in a 23-inning Inter-State League contest. The game was completed in 4 hours and 25 minutes before a crowd of 560 fans. The second game was postponed.
- February 1, 1950: The Hagerstown Field Athletic Association, the group which originally constructed Municipal Stadium, transferred ownership of the facility to the City of Hagerstown. The facility, previously just known as the Stadium would henceforth be referred to as Municipal Stadium.
- June 24, 1950: Willie Mays played his first professional game at Hagerstown's Municipal Stadium. On that historic day, the Trenton Giants played against the Hagerstown Braves of the Class-B Interstate League.
- September 21, 1952: Before a crowd of 1,606, the Braves won the Interstate League championship as pitcher Bob Giggie tossed a five-hit shutout against the Lancaster Red Roses, winning 4–0. The Braves won the championship series, 4 games to 2.
- April 21, 1954: A new upgraded lighting system is installed. The band from Woodland Way Junior High School gave a concert to mark the occasion.
- September 12, 1955: The Hagerstown Packets played the last two home games of the 1955 season, splitting a doubleheader with the Lancaster Red Roses. The Packets won the first game by a 5–1 score, while the Red Roses won the second game by a score of 6–2. It would be the last professional baseball game at Municipal Stadium for over a quarter century.
- April 29, 1961: Fire destroyed the old wooden grandstand of Municipal Stadium. The flames razed the 900-seat grandstand, as well as the dressing room, refreshment stand, press box and offices located beneath the grandstand. A contributing factor to the blaze was that the nearest fire hydrants were 750 feet away. Charles William Redmond, Jr. confessed to setting fire to the stadium when he was arrested for burglary and arson of radio station WHAG in Hagerstown on August 14, 1962.
- April 10, 1981: After a hiatus of over two decades, professional baseball returned to Municipal Stadium with the debut of the Hagerstown Suns. The game was attended by 2,643 fans. The installation of new lights was incomplete, forcing the game to be played in the afternoon. Dane Anthony pitched a complete game in a 6–2 victory for the Suns over the Peninsula Pilots.
- June 28, 1983: Municipal Stadium hosted the Class A Carolina League All-Star Game, in which the South Division defeated the North Division, 5–2, before a crowd of 1,043. This is the only time Municipal Stadium hosted a minor league All-Star Game.
- August 10, 1983: In a Hagerstown Suns game against the Durham Bulls with an attendance of 6,192, rehabilitation start for Jim Palmer.
- April 15, 1985: The Hagerstown Suns played their parent club Baltimore Orioles in an exhibition game.
- July 16, 1988: The 1988 USA baseball team played an exhibition game at Municipal Stadium. Team USA played Team Taiwan (Chinese-Taipei) in the contest, giving Hagerstown fans the opportunity to see both teams before the Olympics began. The USA team won the game by a 10–2 score and would go on to win the Gold Medal at the Olympics.
- May 3, 2003: Clay Hensley threw the only perfect game in Hagerstown Suns history and the only perfect game at Municipal Stadium. Hensley accomplished the feat against the Kannapolis Intimidators in the second game of a doubleheader, winning 2–0. No balls were hit out of the infield.
- June 19, 2005: Pitcher Gaby Hernandez's 115-pitch no-hitter in a 1–0 win over the West Virginia Power on June 19 set up a one-game playoff between the Suns and Lexington Legends on June 25 for the South Atlantic League Northern Division first-half crown. In the one-game playoff on June 26, the Suns defeated the Legends, 9–4, with Hernandez again taking the mound and the win.
- April 15, 2011: In the 2011 Season Home Opener attended by 6,107, which marked the debut of Bryce Harper, the Suns lost to the Lakewood BlueClaws 8-4.
- July 22, 2011: A light pole fell onto the baseball field at Municipal Stadium during a storm, causing the cancellation of the Hagerstown Suns' game against the Augusta GreenJackets. The pole fell between the end of the bleachers and the picnic area on the third-base side of the field. The pole crushed a section of chain-link fence and came to rest on the playing field just behind third base. There were no injuries. The Hagerstown Light Department made repairs. The Suns were able to play the next day.
- August 7, 2011: In a Hagerstown Suns game against the Greensboro Grasshoppers with an attendance of 6,758, Stephen Strasburg's rehabilitation starts.
- September 13, 2014: The fifth and deciding game of the South Atlantic League championship series was played. The Southern Division Asheville Tourists defeated the Northern Division Hagerstown Suns by a 4–1 score, winning the series three games to two.
- June 1–4, 2017: Tim Tebow and the visiting Columbia Fireflies come to Hagerstown for a four-game series, drawing 6,217 fans for the opener Thursday night, 5,894 on Friday night, and 6,351 on Saturday. The fourth game, on Sunday afternoon, had a comparatively small 4,116 fans, about 500 short of a sellout, bringing the total attendance for the weekend up to 22,578. This was the highest attendance for a four-game series in the history of Municipal Stadium.
- September 2, 2019: The Hagerstown Suns were defeated by the Lakewood BlueClaws by a 10–5 score in the final game of the 2019 season. This game marked the last time affiliated minor league baseball was played in Municipal Stadium.
- August 10, 2021: The semi-professional Hagerstown Braves defeated the Shippensburg Stars 9–2 in game four of the best-of-five series to claim the South Penn Baseball League championship in just the second season of league play for both teams.

== Other events ==
Besides professional baseball, Municipal Stadium hosted numerous other events.

- Hagerstown High School Hubs football
- Semi-professional football (Hagerstown Merchants)
- Carnivals
- Turtle Derby
- Professional wrestling
- Amateur baseball
- Model aircraft competitions
- Youth football
- Professional boxing
- Drum and bugle corps competition
- Youth baseball
- Hagerstown Junior/Community College baseball
- Music concerts
- Dog Show
- Women's professional softball
- Club soccer

== Image Gallery ==
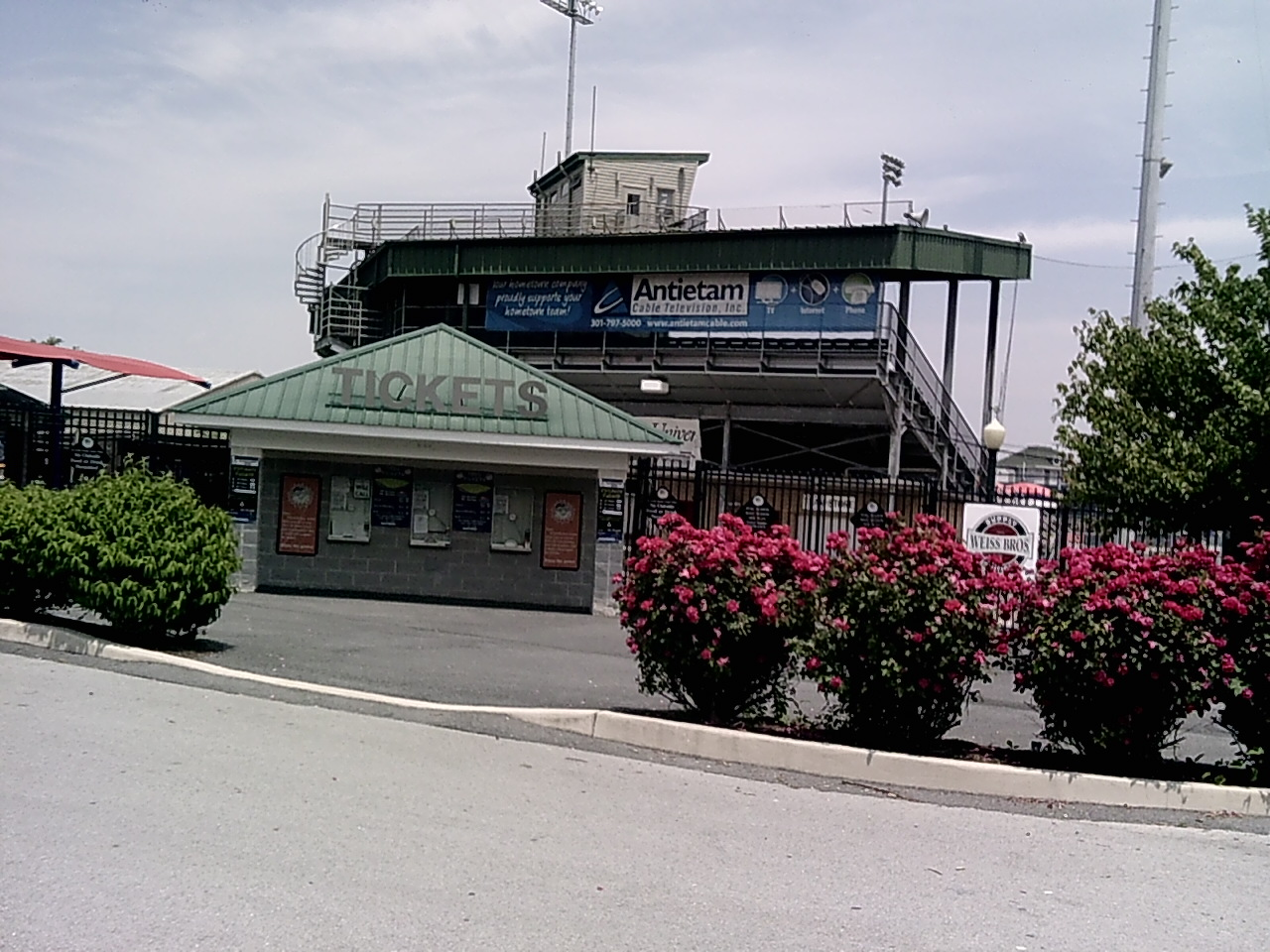
Entrance showing ticket booth and press box at top of grandstand

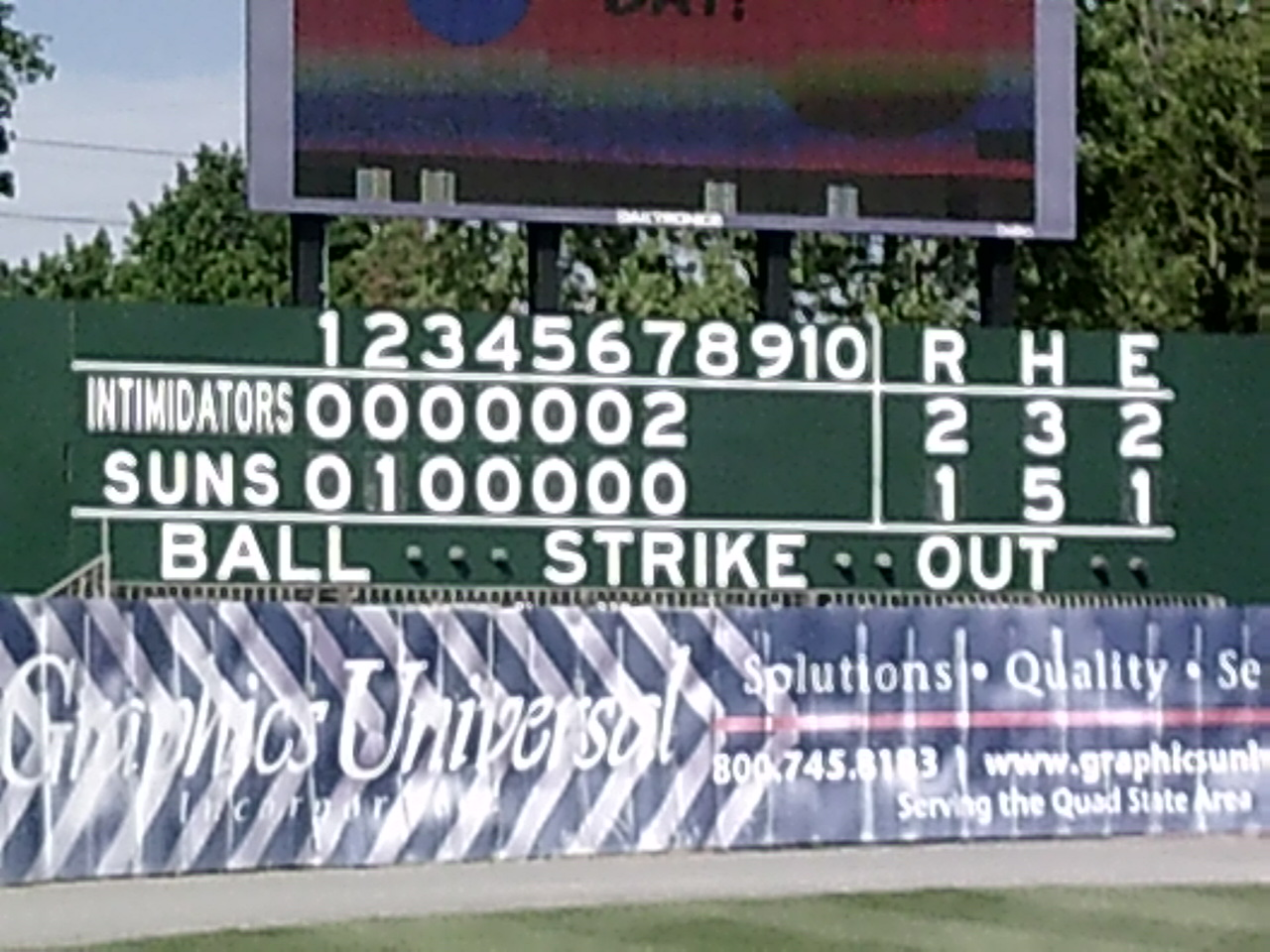
Manually operated scoreboard

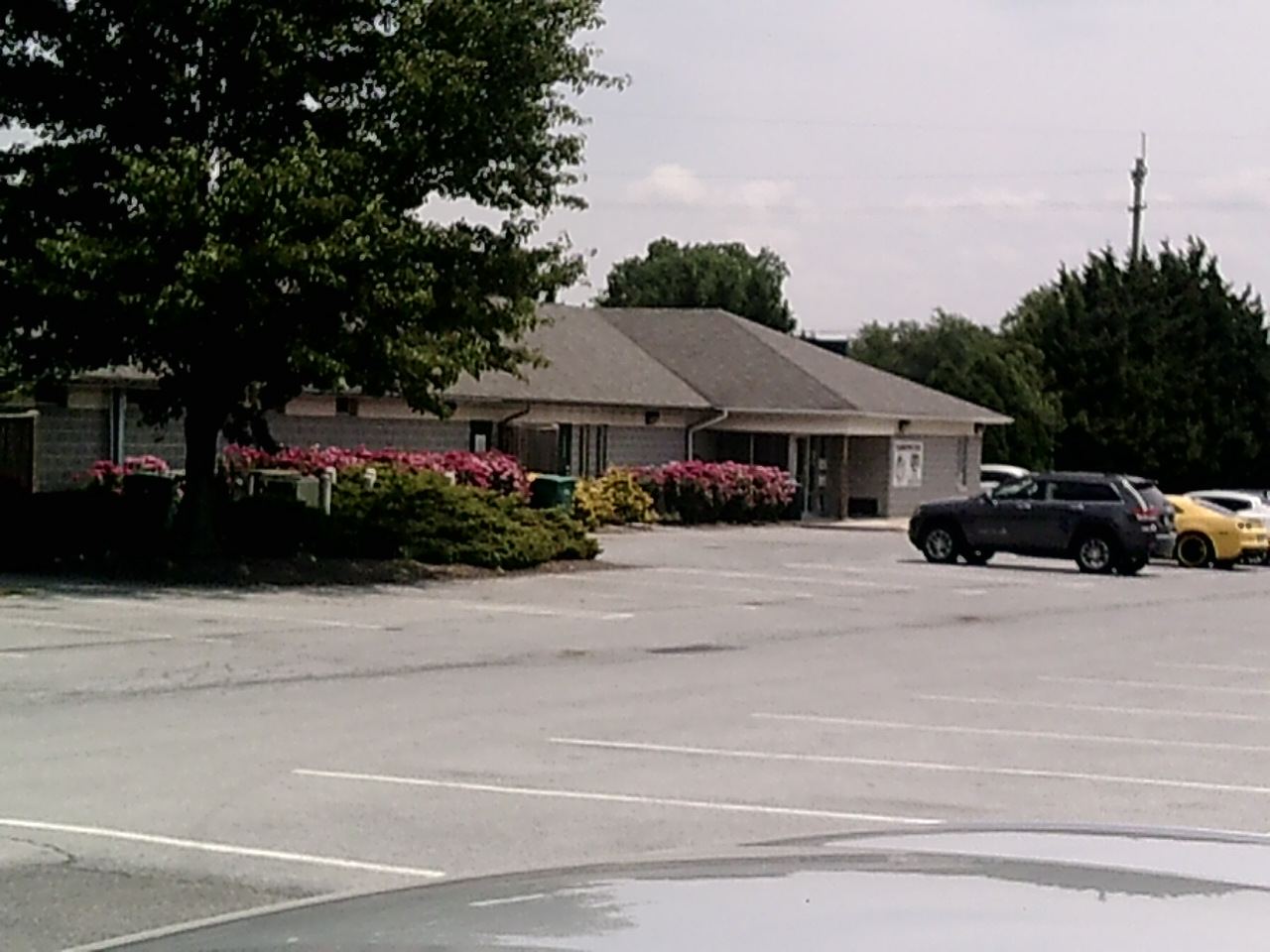
Clubhouse for home and visiting teams

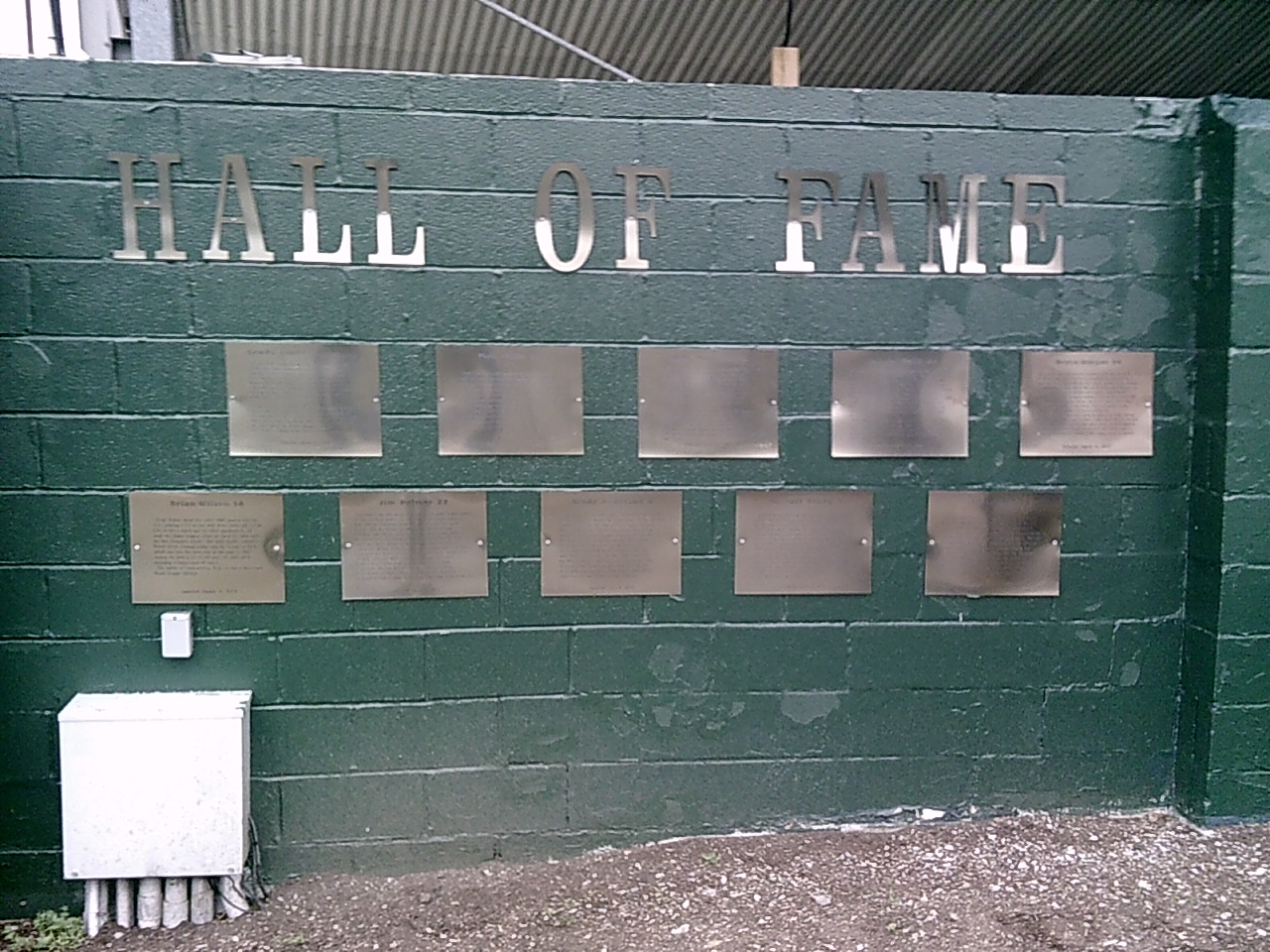
Municipal Stadium Hall of Fame
