= Chester Blue Stockings =

- 1884–1912; (1884–1885, 1901, 1904, 1907–1908, 1912); Chester, Pennsylvania

Minor league affiliations
- Class: Independent (1884–1885); Class D (1901); Independent (1904, 1907–1908, 1912)
- League: Keystone Association (1884–1885); Pennsylvania State League (1901); Pennsylvania League (1904); Atlantic League (1907); Pennsylvania-New Jersey League (1908); Tri-State League (1912)

Major league affiliations
- Team: None

Minor league titles
- League titles (0): None

Team data
- Name: Chester Blue Stockings (1884–1885); Chester (1901, 1904, 1907–1908, 1912)
- Ballpark: Union Park (1884–1885, 1901, 1904, 1907–1908, 1912)

The Chester Blue Stockings were a minor league baseball teams based in Chester, Pennsylvania. Between 1884 and 1912, Chester teams played as members of the Keystone Association (1884–1885), Pennsylvania State League (1901), Pennsylvania League (1904), Atlantic League (1907), Pennsylvania-New Jersey League (1908) and Tri-State League (1912). Chester teams hosted minor league home games at Union Park.

== History ==
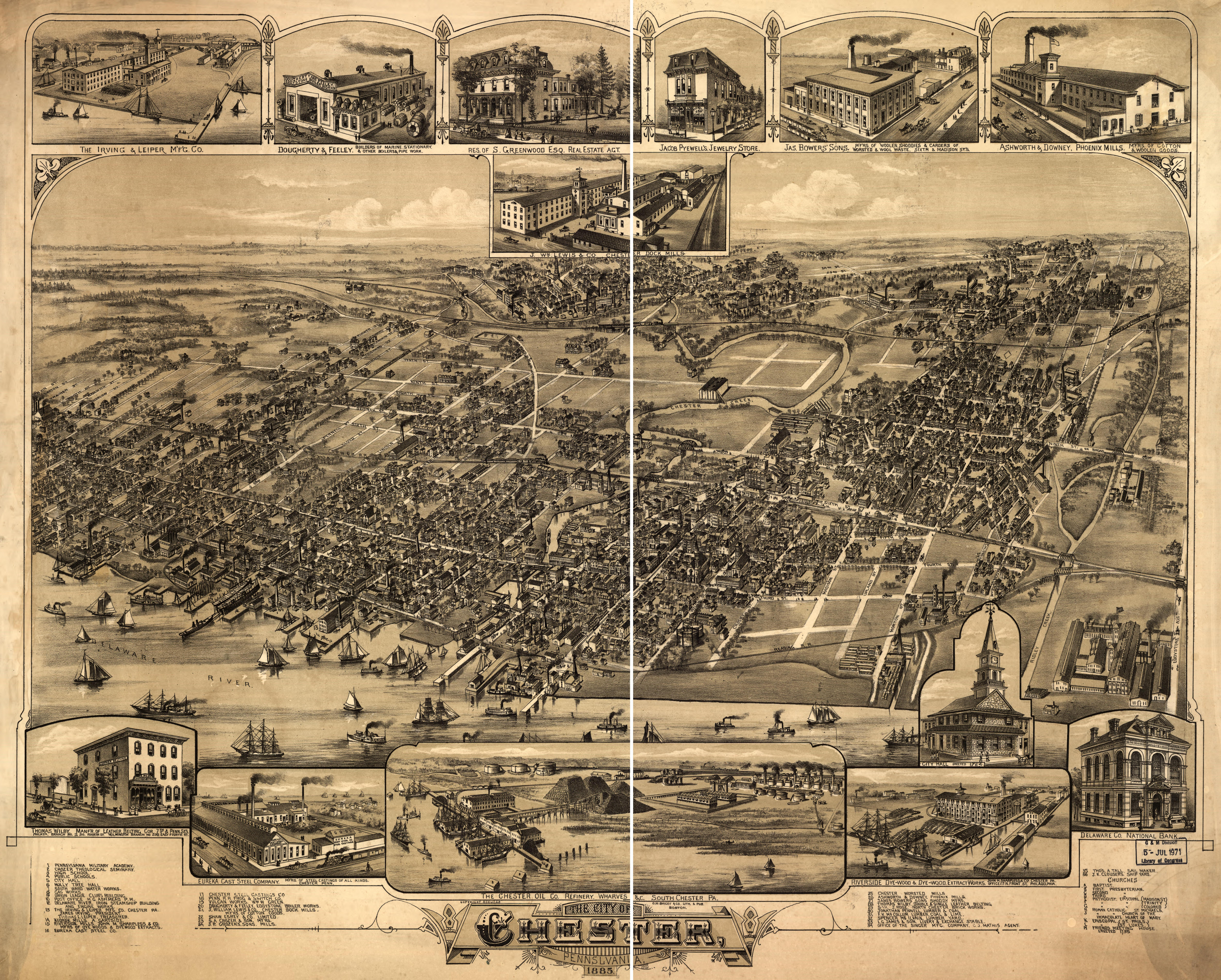
An 1885 illustration of Chester, Pennsylvania

The Keystone Association and the member teams were formed at a March 3, 1884 meeting in Lancaster, Pennsylvania, Carlisle, Pennsylvania and West Chester, Pennsylvania were franchises admitted to the league but never played.

The Chester Blue Stockings began play in 1884, as the Keystone Association played as a five–team Independent league. The other Keystone Association franchises were based in Chambersburg, Pennsylvania, Lancaster, Pennsylvania, Littlestown, Pennsylvania and York, Pennsylvania.

The Chester Blue Stockings began Keystone Association play on May 2, 1884. During the 1884 season, the Chester franchise disbanded on June 2, 1884. On June 10, 1884, the league folded for the season with the Blue Stockings in fourth place, 6.5 games behind first place Lancaster, playing under manager Thomas Hargraves. The League standings when the league folded were Lancaster Red Stockings (15–4), York White Roses (10–10), Chambersburg (8–10), Chester Blue Stockings (8–10) and Littlestown Brown Stockings (6–8). Lancaster disbanded on June 7, 1884, causing the rest of the league to fold.

The 1885 Chester Blue Stockings returned to Keystone Association play, as the league featured the same five returning franchises. Chambersburg, the Chester Blue Stockings, Lancaster Red Stockings, Littlestown Brown Stockings and York White Roses all returned as 1885 league members. The 1885 league records and standings are unknown. The 1885 Keystone Association final team standings are unknown.

Chester returned to play as members of the 1901 Class D level Pennsylvania State League. 1901 league records and standings are unknown. Jesse Frysinger managed the Chester team.

In 1904, the Chester team played as members of the Independent level Pennsylvania League. League standings for the six–team league are unknown.

The Chester team played in the 1907 Independent level Atlantic League. The Tamaqua, Pennsylvania franchise combined with Chester. Joseph Senior, John Castle, Jack Quinn and James McGeehan were the managers. League standings and records for the six–team league are unknown.

The 1908 Chester team became members of the Independent level Pennsylvania-New Jersey League. Chester had an 8–3 record to finish in second place under manager Steve Yerkes. Trenton finished first in the six–team league, percentage points ahead of Chester.

In 1912, Chester played briefly as members of the Class D level Tri-State League after joining the league during the season. The Johnstown Johnnies moved to Chester on August 2, 1912, with a record of 25–60. The Johnstown/Chester team ended the 1912 season with a record of 31–81, placing eighth in the standings. Bert Conn and Curt Wiegand served as managers.

The Chester franchise folded following the 1912 season. Chester, Pennsylvania has not hosted another minor league team.

== The ballpark ==
The Chester minor league teams were noted to have played home games at Union Park. Still in use as a public park, the park is now named Veterans Memorial Park, Chester, Pennsylvania.

== Timeline ==
Year(s)	# Yrs.	Team	Level	League	Ballpark
1884–1885	2	Chester Blue Stockings	Independent	Keystone Association	Union Park (Veterans Memorial Park)
1901	1	Chester	Class D	Pennsylvania State League	Union Park (Veterans Memorial Park)
1904	1	Chester	Independent	Pennsylvania League	Union Park (Veterans Memorial Park)
1907	1	Chester	Independent	Atlantic League	Union Park (Veterans Memorial Park)
1908	1	Chester	Independent	Pennsylvania-New Jersey League	Union Park (Veterans Memorial Park)
1912	1	Chester	Independent	Tri-State League	Union Park (Veterans Memorial Park)

== Year-by-year records ==
Year	Record	Finish	Manager	Playoffs/Notes
1884	8–10	4th	Thomas Hargraves	Team folded June 2 League folded June 10
1885	00–00	NA	NA	League records unknown
1901	00–00	NA	Jesse Frysinger	League records unknown
1904	00–00	NA	NA	League records unknown
1907	00–00	NA	Joseph Senior / John Castle; Jack Quinn / James McGeehan	League records unknown
1908	8–2	2nd	Steve Yerkes	No playoffs held
1912	31–81	8th	Bert Conn / Curt Wiegand	Johnstown moved to Chester August 2

== Notable alumni ==
- Frank Berkelbach (1884)
- Bert Conn (1912, MGR)
- Snake Deal (1901)
- John Deasley (1884)
- Bill Farmer (1884)
- Harry Felix (1901)
- Paddy Greene (1901)
- Bill Jones (1884)
- Charlie Jordan (1901)
- Phil Ketter (1912)
- Joe Knotts (1904)
- Mike Mowrey (1904)
- Fred Odwell (1901)
- Cub Stricker (1901)
- Jesse Whiting (1901)
- Chester (minor league baseball) players
- Chester Blue Stockings players
- Chester Johnnies players
