= Dutch Dorman =

Frederick E. "Dutch" Dorman (June 6, 1902, in Carlstadt, New Jersey – April 5, 1988, in York, Pennsylvania) was a long-time minor league baseball player and manager who later scouted for the Philadelphia Phillies and Atlanta Braves.

Dorman played from 1922 to 1947 and in one game in 1955, hitting around .291 with at least 2,623 hits in 2,541 games. Not a power hitter, he hit zero home runs in a season 19 times and hit a career high of only five. He doubled as many as 32 times in a season. In seasons in which he played at least 75 games, Dorman hit .300 or better nine times.

Dorman managed every year from 1936 to 1947 and from 1949 to 1955. He initially managed the York White Roses in 1936, but was replaced. He then took over as manager of the Johnstown Johnnies. He managed the Duluth Dukes from 1937 to 1939, leading them to league championship victories the first two years and a playoff berth in the last.

In 1940, he managed the Sunbury Indians and, for part of the season, the Cooleemee Cards. In 1941 and 1942, Dorman led the Hagerstown Owls, leading them to the playoffs both years - and to the league finals in the latter season, though they lost the series.

Dorman managed the Wilmington Blue Rocks in 1943 and 1944, leading them to the playoffs in his first season with the team and being replaced partway through the second. In 1945, he returned to the Hagerstown Owls, replacing their manager partway through the year. He managed the Hartford Bees in 1946 and the Hartford Chiefs in 1947, leading the Bees to the league finals, which they lost.

He managed the Pawtucket Slaters for part of the 1949 season and the Hagerstown Braves from 1950 to 1953. He led them to a league championship victory in 1952, to the league finals in 1950 and to a playoff berth in 1951. He managed for three teams over the final two seasons of his career - the Allentown Cardinals in 1954 and the Waterloo White Hawks and Sunbury Red Legs in 1955.
