= Jesse Levan =

American baseball player (1926–1998)

- Levan playing for Chattanooga in 1957
- Pinch hitter / Third baseman / Left fielder
- Born: July 15, 1926; Reading, Pennsylvania, U.S.
- Died: November 30, 1998 (aged 72); Reading, Pennsylvania, U.S.
- Batted: Left Threw: Right

MLB debut
- September 27, 1947, for the Philadelphia Phillies

Last MLB appearance
- May 15, 1955, for the Washington Senators

MLB statistics
- Batting average: .286
- Home runs: 1
- Runs batted in: 5
- Stats at Baseball Reference

Teams
- Philadelphia Phillies (1947); Washington Senators (1954–1955)

Jesse Roy Levan (July 15, 1926 – November 30, 1998) was an American professional baseball player. In a 14-season pro career, he appeared in Major League Baseball in 1947 with the Philadelphia Phillies of the National League and in 1954 and 1955 with the American League's Washington Senators. He was officially listed as standing 6 feet (180 cm) and weighing 172 pounds (78 kg). In 25 career major league games, Levan had a .286 batting average with a home run and five runs batted in (RBI).

Levan originally signed with the Phillies organization in 1944, then served in World War II after one season. He returned in 1947 and spent two games on the major league roster before returning to the minor leagues, where he won multiple minor league batting titles. He bounced around in various minor league organizations until 1954, when the Washington Senators picked him up. Levan spent the next two seasons with Washington before spending four years with the Chattanooga Lookouts. While in Chattanooga, Levan became the last person banned by baseball's governing organizations for conspiring to fix games, which ended his professional career.

== Early life ==
Levan was born on July 15, 1926, in Reading, Pennsylvania. Playing in youth leagues, he won his first amateur batting titles, and he led the Reading High School baseball team to their league championship behind his .443 batting average and a three home run performance in one of the Knights' thirteen games. Cy Morgan, a scout for the Philadelphia Phillies, signed Levan to a $1,000 contract ($18,300 today) in 1944, prior to his graduation from high school. A reporter for the Reading Eagle-Times called Levan one of "the best natural hitters in Berks County history".

== Early career ==
=== Wilmington, the Army, and Philadelphia ===
After signing with the Phillies, Levan was assigned to the Wilmington Blue Rocks of the Interstate League. He played in 136 games for the class-B club, hitting four home runs and batting .316. In October, he was drafted into the Army, serving the remainder of the year, as well as 1945 and 1946, with the 94th Infantry Division and winning the European Armed Forces batting championship with a .343 average. Levan was reassigned to Wilmington after returning to the United States. He combined his earlier speed (his 100-yard dash in uniform had been clocked at 10 seconds) with newfound power, hitting 19 home runs, 19 doubles, and a team-leading 20 triples.

At the close of the Interstate League season, Levan was called up to the Phillies. He made his major league debut against the New York Giants, collecting his first hit in his second official at bat. Batting second in the lineup, he finished his first game 2-for-5, notching his first major league run batted in (RBI). The following day, he helped pitcher Curt Simmons, a former teammate in American Legion Baseball, earn his first victory over Andy Hansen of the Giants by hitting safely twice in four times at bat and scoring one run.

=== Six teams in two seasons ===
After offseason medical treatment at Johns Hopkins University, Levan opened the 1948 season with the Toronto Maple Leafs of the International League. He hit three doubles and three home runs, but was demoted to Wilmington after 31 contests. He batted .344 for the Blue Rocks, the best mark among the team's players who appeared in more than 30 games, collecting 49 extra-base hits.

The Phillies sold Levan's rights to the Boston Braves-affiliated Milwaukee Brewers, where he batted only .103 before being demoted to the Hartford Chiefs. He batted .291 in 223 at-bats with the class-A Sunbury Reds, amassing twelve doubles, three triples, and five home runs, but by the end of the year had been demoted to the class-D Bluefield Blue–Grays.

== Later years ==
=== Two batting titles ===
During the 1950 season, Levan played for the Hagerstown Braves, Boston's B-level affiliate. Second on the club with 512 at-bats, the 23-year-old lefthander led the Braves in hits (177) and doubles (34), finishing second to Joe Tedesco with 13 home runs and 7 triples. His .344 batting average was the best in that year's Interstate League, Levan's first professional batting championship. For his efforts, he was named to the league's postseason all-star team. The Braves sold Levan to the unaffiliated Class-B Raleigh Capitals, where he hit .222 in 18 at-bats. He was released by the Carolina club and signed with the Provincial League's Saints of St. Hyacinthe, a town in Quebec. In 120 games in Canada, Levan batted .347 and led the team with 17 home runs and 36 doubles.

The following season, Levan moved south to the Florida- and Cuba-based Florida International League, winning a second batting title by hitting .337 for the Miami Beach Flamingos and leading the team in times at bat (574) and doubles (35). In 1953, he played a short period with the Atlanta Crackers, but spent most of the season back in the Florida International League, batting .323 for the Fort Lauderdale Lions. He notched a .502 slugging percentage while collecting 31 doubles and 6 home runs.

=== Second chance at the majors ===
In 1954, the Lions transferred their franchise back to Miami, becoming the Flamingos once again. Levan led the team with 23 home runs—the only player to exceed a single-digit total—as well as having the club's best hit (130) and doubles (21) totals. Despite leading the team in these categories by season's end, Levan actually left the Miami franchise in August to report to the Single-A level affiliate of the Washington Senators, based in Charlotte, North Carolina. He batted .412 for the Hornets for the remainder of the South Atlantic League season, notching 21 extra-base hits. The Senators called him up for seven games in September; he made his American League debut on the sixth of that month, collecting no hits in four at-bats as Washington's first baseman. His first hit with the Senators came on September 18, when he had a pinch-hit single in the 8th frame of a 15-inning contest against the Boston Red Sox. Levan raised his average to .286 in his next game, leading off against the New York Yankees and singling in his only at bat. He appeared in three consecutive contests to complete his first term with the Senators, going hitless on September 24 and 25 and singling on September 26 to fix his yearly batting average in the majors at .300.

Levan began the 1955 season on the Senators' bench, playing exclusively as a pinch-hitter during this major league campaign. He opened the year auspiciously, notching an RBI single in his first at-bat of the season, pinch-hitting on April 11. He collected another hit on April 22, but then remained hitless until mid-May, when he appeared in both games of a doubleheader against the Baltimore Orioles. In the nightcap, he hit his first and only major league home run, scoring himself and plating two runs (Bruce Edwards, who doubled leading off the inning; and Bobby Kline, who hit into a fielder's choice). After hitless performances against the Detroit Tigers and the Chicago White Sox, manager Chuck Dressen demoted Levan to Charlotte, ending his brief major league career. For the remainder of the year, he played primarily first base and the outfield for the Hornets, batting .280 with seven home runs.

=== Chattanooga and the ban ===
Levan was promoted to the double-A Chattanooga Lookouts of the Southern Association for the 1956 season, where he would finish his career. He led the Looks with 25 home runs that year, batting .311 and slugging .512. The following season, Levan partnered with Harmon Killebrew to set a Southern Association record for most home runs and RBI by a pair of hitters for the same team, as he contributed 26 home runs and 118 RBI to the tandem total. That year, he won the Southern Association batting crown by hitting .345, including a six-game period in which he went 18-for-25 with 11 extra-base hits; the Chattanooga News – Free Press called it 'the greatest batting spree in minor league history.'"

In 1958, the Arkansas Democrat named Levan a "hitting machine" after he went 7-for-8 over a two-game span; for the season, he batted .292 with 26 home runs, the largest single-season total that he hit for a single team, and added 15 doubles and 4 triples to those totals in 558 at-bats, the team's second highest mark. Levan was leading the 1959 Lookouts with a .337 batting average in July 1959 when his teammates were summoned to a meeting with the Southern Association president, Charles Hurth.

The Southern Association alleged that Levan, in combination with Waldo Gonzalez, conspired to fix games by tipping pitches to opposing players. Gonzalez was accused of relaying pitches to players and coaches for the Mobile Bears, and Levan was allegedly the arranger of the scheme, "acting as a liaison agent for betting interests and offering fellow club members money to throw games". Another gambling scandal involved players intentionally fouling off balls in order for gamblers in the stands to take advantage of patrons; the latter scandal, also involving Levan, caused Joe Tipton to earn a life ban from the SA. After interrogating both Gonzalez and Levan, the players were suspended indefinitely (Gonzalez' ban was later reduced to a one-year suspension) for "failure to report a bribery attempt by a gambler"; Levan was also placed on the permanently ineligible list, barring him from participating in any baseball events sponsored by the National Association, minor league baseball's governing body.

== After baseball ==
After leaving baseball, Levan returned to his hometown of Reading with his wife, Geraldine. He worked for the Berks Meat Packing Company as a truck driver and coached softball teams. He retired from Berks in 1988 and was honored as a baseball legend in a ceremony at Municipal Stadium in Reading in 1996. He was also inducted into the Pennsylvania Sports Hall of Fame. Levan died at age 72 on November 30, 1998, and was interred in Charles Evans Cemetery.

== See also ==
- List of people banned from Major League Baseball
