= Woody Wheaton =

American baseball player

- Pitcher / Outfielder
- Born: October 3, 1914; Philadelphia, Pennsylvania, U.S.
- Died: December 11, 1995 (aged 81); Lancaster, Pennsylvania, U.S.
- Batted: Left Threw: Left

MLB debut
- September 28, 1943, for the Philadelphia Athletics

Last MLB appearance
- August 17, 1944, for the Philadelphia Athletics

MLB statistics
- Batting average: .191
- Home runs: 0
- RBI: 7
- Pitching record: 0–1
- Earned run average: 3.55
- Strikeouts: 15
- Stats at Baseball Reference

Teams
- Philadelphia Athletics (1943–1944)

Elwood Pierce "Woody" Wheaton (October 3, 1914 – December 11, 1995) was an American left-handed Major League Baseball outfielder and pitcher who played for the Philadelphia Athletics in 1943 and 1944.

He made his major league debut on September 28, 1943 at the age of 28. He played in seven games for the Athletics that season, hitting .200 with no home runs and two RBI in 30 at-bats. The following season, 1944, he hit .186 in 30 games, collecting 11 hits in 59 at-bats and driving in five runs. He also appeared in eleven games as a pitcher, one of which was a start. He went 0–1 with a 3.55 ERA, allowing 36 hits and 20 walks in 38 innings while striking out 15. On August 17, 1944, he appeared in his final big league game.

Overall, Wheaton hit .191 in 37 games, collecting 17 hits in 89 at-bats.

Wheaton also spent 17 seasons in the minor leagues, hitting .297 in 1,729 games. He had 1,810 hits, of which 244 were doubles, 84 were triples and 27 were home runs. In 1939, with the Hazleton Mountaineers, he hit .428 with 17 doubles and 16 triples in 101 games (432 at-bats). As a pitcher, he went 90–77 in 250 appearances. In 1948, with the Welch Miners, he went 14–6 with a 3.53 ERA (as a batter, he hit .357 in 364 at-bats that season). In 1943 with the Lancaster Red Roses, he went 13–3. He also spent a few seasons managing in the minors with the Red Roses, Rome Colonels, Moline A's, Hagerstown Owls, and Harrisburg Senators.

Following his death, he was buried in Arlington Cemetery in Drexel Hill, Pennsylvania.
