= Pennsylvania-New Jersey League =

Baseball minor league

Pennsylvania–New Jersey League
- Classification: Independent (1908)
- Sport: Minor League Baseball
- First season: 1908
- Folded: 1908
- President: Unknown (1908)
- No. of teams: 6
- Country: United States of America
- Most titles: 1 Chester (1908); Trenton (1908)
- Related competitions: Pennsylvania League (1903–1904)

The Pennsylvania-New Jersey League was a six–team Independent level minor league baseball league that played in the 1908 season. As the name indicates, the Pennsylvania-New Jersey League featured franchises based in New Jersey and Pennsylvania. The Pennsylvania–New Jersey League permanently folded after the 1908 season.

== History ==
The Pennsylvania–New Jersey League formed as Independent level minor league that played in the 1908 season.

The 1908 Pennsylvania–New Jersey League formed as a six–team Independent league, beginning play on April 30, 1908. The Pennsylvania–New Jersey League hosted franchises based in Allentown, Pennsylvania, Chester, Pennsylvania, Coatesville, Pennsylvania, Newark, New Jersey, Trenton, New Jersey and York, Pennsylvania.

The York franchise was owned and managed by Y.G. Thomas. York had begun the season playing briefly in the 1908 semi–professional Atlantic League before joining the new Pennsylvania–New Jersey League. Tickets for games at the York Athletic Club Grounds were 25 cents for general admission, with an additional 10 cents for the grandstand. Season tickets were $10.00 for 50 games.

York played their home opening game against Newark on May 2, 1908. Before the game, a parade was held, led by the Spring Garden band and featuring the York and Newark teams. York Mayor Weaver threw out the first pitch. York won the game by a score of 9–4.

Trenton, New Jersey hosted two minor league teams in 1908, as the Trenton Tigers placed sixth in the Class B level Tri-State League with a 54–73 record.

With the league allowing ties, the Pennsylvania–New Jersey League final standings had Chester (8–3–1) and Trenton (7–2–1) in a tie for first place, but with Trenton having a higher win percentage. Allentown (6–3–2), Coatesville (5–6–2), York (5–7–0) and Newark (0–10–0) followed in the standings.

The Pennsylvania–New Jersey League permanently folded after the 1908 season.

== Pennsylvania–New Jersey League teams ==
Team name(s)	City represented	Ballpark	Year active
Allentown	Allentown, Pennsylvania	Allentown Fairgrounds	1908
Chester	Chester, Pennsylvania	Union Park	1908
Coatesville	Coatesville, Pennsylvania	Unknown	1908
Newark	Newark, New Jersey	unknown	1908
Trenton Tigers	Trenton, New Jersey	Unknown	1908
York	York, Pennsylvania	York Athletic Club Grounds	1908

== Pennsylvania–New Jersey League overall standings ==
=== 1908 ===
Team standings	W	L	Tie	PCT	GB	Managers
Trenton	7	2	1	.778	-	Ray Egner
Chester	8	3	1	.727	-	Steve Yerkes
Allentown	6	3	2	.667	1	Hugh McKinnon
Coatsville	5	6	2	.455	3	NA
York	5	7	0	.417	3½	Y.G Thomas
Newark	0	10	0	.000	7½	Harry Martin

== Notable alumni ==
- Sailor Stroud (1908), Trenton
- Steve Yerkes (1908), Chester, MGR
