= Bart Cantz =

American baseball player (1860–1943)

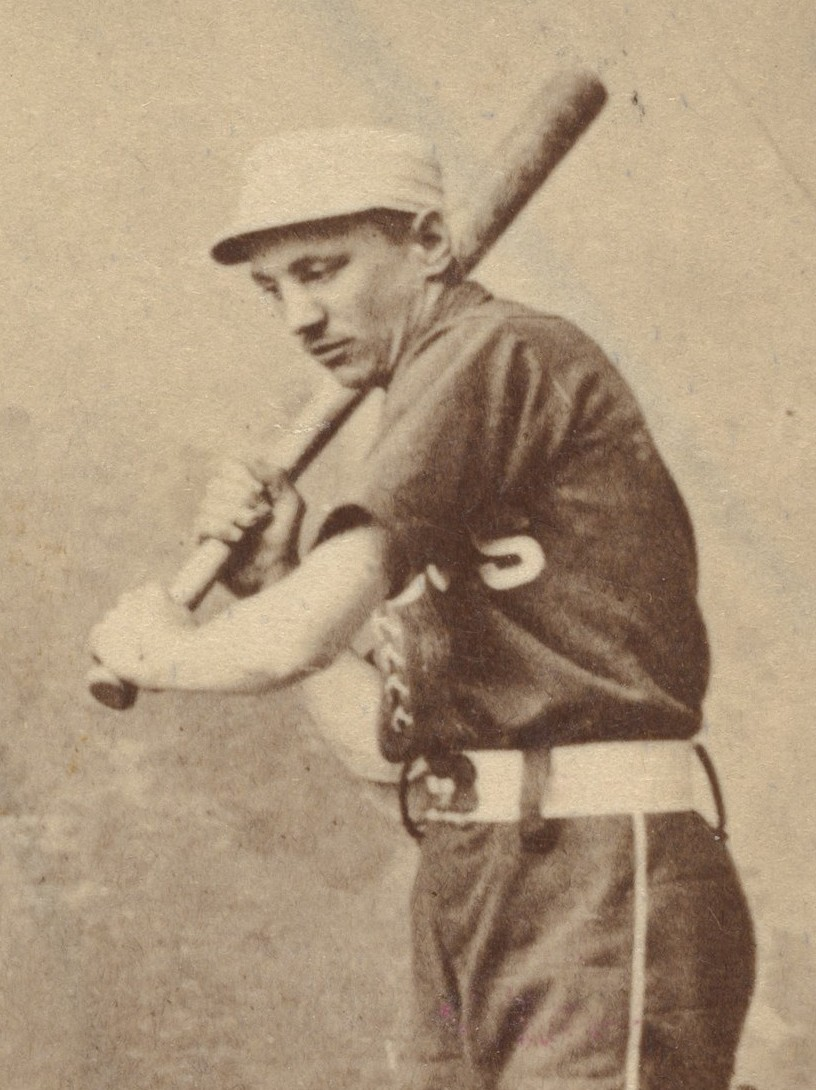
- Cantz from a 1888 baseball card
- Catcher
- Born: January 29, 1860; Philadelphia, Pennsylvania, US
- Died: February 12, 1943 (aged 83); Philadelphia, Pennsylvania, US
- Batted: Right Threw: Right

MLB debut
- July 25, 1888, for the Baltimore Orioles

Last MLB appearance
- May 17, 1890, for the Philadelphia Athletics

MLB statistics
- Batting average: .157
- Hits: 34
- Runs batted in: 18
- Stats at Baseball Reference

Teams
- Baltimore Orioles (AA) (1888–1889); Philadelphia Athletics (AA) (1890)

Bartholomew L. Cantz (January 29, 1860 – February 12, 1943) was an American catcher in Major League Baseball.

== Early life and career ==
Born in Philadelphia, Pennsylvania, Cantz started his professional baseball career in 1884, playing for the Chambersburg Maroons and Littlestown Brown Stockings of the Keystone Association. He played for the Long Island A's and Bridgeport Giants of the Eastern League in 1886. In 1887, he moved to the Newark Little Giants of the International Association.

In 1888, Cantz played for the St. Louis Whites of the Western Association and then was transferred to the American Association's Baltimore Orioles. He appeared in 57 games for the Orioles in 1888–1889. The following year he played with the Philadelphia Athletics, where he appeared in only five games before retiring. In his three major league seasons, Cantz had a .157 batting average with 34 hits and 18 runs batted in.
