= Rube Dessau =

American baseball player

- Pitcher
- Born: March 29, 1883; New Galilee, Pennsylvania, U.S.
- Died: May 6, 1952 (aged 69); York, Pennsylvania, U.S.
- Batted: Switch Threw: Right

MLB debut
- September 22, 1907, for the Boston Doves

Last MLB appearance
- October 12, 1910, for the Brooklyn Superbas

MLB statistics
- Win–loss record: 2–4
- Earned run average: 6.53
- Strikeouts: 25
- Stats at Baseball Reference

Teams
- Boston Doves (1907); Brooklyn Superbas (1910)

Frank Rolland Dessau (March 29, 1883 – May 6, 1952) was an American pitcher in Major League Baseball. He pitched in two games for the 1907 Boston Doves and in nineteen games for the 1910 Brooklyn Superbas. He was also a manager in minor league baseball for the York White Roses, Decatur Commodores, and Springfield Senators over 11 seasons.
