= Stumpf Field =

Baseball stadium in Manheim Township, Pennsylvania

Coordinates: 40°3′31″N 76°18′49″W

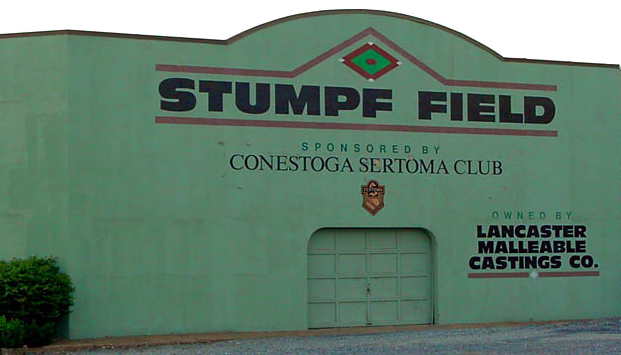
- Interactive map of Stumpf Field
- Location: 1350 Fruitville Pike; Lancaster, PA 17601
- Owner: School District of Lancaster
- Operator: School District of Lancaster
- Field size: Left Field: 350 feet (110 m); Left Center: 350 feet (110 m); Center Field: 350 feet (110 m); Right Center: 350 feet (110 m); Right Field: 350 feet (110 m); Wall: 8 feet (2.4 m)

Construction
- Opened: 1938
- Cost: $

Tenant
- Lancaster Red Roses (1938-1961)

Stumpf Field is a baseball-only stadium in Manheim Township, Pennsylvania that opened in 1938. It was built as the home of the Lancaster Red Roses baseball team, who played in the Interstate, Piedmont, and Eastern Leagues through 1961. The ballpark is now used for intramural and high school baseball. This field was donated to the Red Rose players by John G. Stumpf, owner of Stumpf Oil, among other foundations and monuments throughout Lancaster County.

== History ==
Built in 1938, Stumpf Field is a simple ballpark with makeshift bleachers down each baseline. The ballpark once had covered bleachers behind home plate, but they have been taken down. The seating on both the first and third baselines is still in place, and most of its original wooden frame remains.

The Lancaster Red Roses played at Stumpf Field from 1938 to 1961. The team folded in 1961, and Stumpf Field has since been relegated as a local baseball and softball venue. It was sold to Jeff Sweigart, owner of McMinn's Asphalt and a baseball enthusiast, in 2003 and renovated for local baseball leagues for players ages 20–40, as well as for 40 and older. Stumpf Field was the home of the Millersville University Marauders baseball team before the 2007 season until a new stadium was erected on campus.

== See also ==
- Clipper Magazine Stadium

Preceded by —	Home of the Lancaster Red Roses; 1938–1961	Succeeded by Last facility used by the Red Roses
