= Bob Maier =

American baseball player (1915–1993)

- Third Baseman
- Born: September 5, 1915; Dunellen, New Jersey, U.S.
- Died: August 4, 1993 (aged 77); South Plainfield, New Jersey, U.S.
- Batted: Right Threw: Right

MLB debut
- April 17, 1945, for the Detroit Tigers

Last MLB appearance
- September 20, 1945, for the Detroit Tigers

MLB statistics
- Batting average: .263
- Home runs: 1
- Runs batted in: 34
- Stolen bases: 7
- Stats at Baseball Reference

Teams
- Detroit Tigers (1945)

Career highlights and awards
- World Series champion (1945)

Robert Phillip Maier (September 5, 1915 – August 4, 1993) was an American professional baseball player from 1937 to 1945. He played one season in Major League Baseball as a third baseman for the Detroit Tigers during their 1945 World Series championship season.

Maier was born in Dunellen, New Jersey, in 1915. He played minor league baseball from 1937 to 1944, including four years with the Salisbury Cardinals in the Eastern Shore League (1938–1941), two years with the Hagerstown Owls in the Interstate League (1942–1943), and one year with the Buffalo Bisons of the International League. In 1943, he set an Interstate League single season record with 52 doubles. The 52 doubles were also a high for all of professional baseball in 1943.

Maier played only one season in the big leagues, but he spent that season on a championship team. Maier played in 132 games for the 1945 Detroit Tigers, batting .263 in 486 at bats with 58 runs, 34 RBIs, 25 doubles, 7 triples, and 7 stolen bases. He was one of three Tigers with ten at bats in a 24-inning, 1–1 tie with the Philadelphia Athletics that season. The game remains as the longest in Detroit Tigers history.

Though he was the starting third baseman during the regular season, the starting job went to Jimmy Outlaw in the 1945 World Series, as Outlaw moved from the outfield to third base to make room for Hank Greenberg who had returned from military service late in the season. Maier appeared in Game 6 of the World Series as a pinch hitter for catcher Paul Richards. His one at bat in the World Series proved to be his last in professional baseball, and he hit a single off Chicago Cubs pitcher Claude Passeau for a lifetime batting average of 1.000 in the postseason. Maier was replaced as the Tigers starting third baseman in 1946 by future Hall of Famer George Kell. Maier died in 1993 in South Plainfield, New Jersey.
