= Charlie Rhodes =

American baseball player (1885–1918)

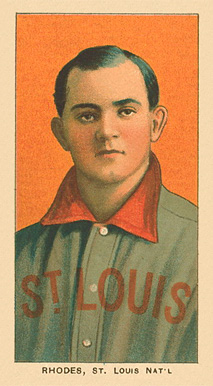
- Pitcher
- Born: April 7, 1885; Caney, Kansas
- Died: October 26, 1918 (aged 33); Caney, Kansas
- Batted: Right Threw: Right

MLB debut
- July 26, 1906, for the St. Louis Cardinals

Last MLB appearance
- June 14, 1909, for the St. Louis Cardinals

MLB statistics
- Win–loss record: 7–11
- Earned run average: 3.46
- Strikeouts: 76
- Stats at Baseball Reference

Teams
- St. Louis Cardinals (1906); Cincinnati Reds (1908); St. Louis Cardinals (1908–1909)

Charles Anderson Rhodes (April 7, 1885 – October 26, 1918) was a professional baseball player who played pitcher in the major leagues from 1906 to 1909. Rhodes played for the St. Louis Cardinals and Cincinnati Reds.

He was nicknamed "Dusty" by Sporting Life while pitching for the Trenton Tigers in 1907.
