= Trenton Tigers (baseball) =

Information
- Location: Trenton, New Jersey
- Founded: 1907

The Trenton Tigers were a minor league baseball team based in Trenton, New Jersey. They played in the Class-B Tri-State League from 1907 to 1914, and briefly in the 1908 Pennsylvania-New Jersey League. They represented the city of Trenton, New Jersey.

== History ==
The Tigers entered Organized Baseball as a charter member of the Tri-State League in 1907, finishing fourth in their debut season with a 70–54 record. They remained in the league through 1914, posting a 431–478 overall mark. In 1908, the team also competed in the short-lived Pennsylvania-New Jersey League, ending with a 54–73 record in the Tri-State portion of their split season.

The 1911 season was the team's most successful, with a 65–46 regular-season record (second place) and a playoff championship victory over Williamsport. The franchise folded after the 1914 season, when the Tri-State League reorganized. Home games were played at an unnamed ballpark in Trenton, though specific details are scarce.

== Season-by-season results ==
Year	League	Record	Finish	Attendance	Postseason
1907	Tri-State	70–54	4th	—	No playoffs
1908	Tri-State	54–73	6th	—	No playoffs
1908	Pennsylvania-New Jersey League	—	—	—	League folded July 1908
1909	Tri-State	43–71	7th	—	No playoffs
1910	Tri-State	58–52	4th	—	No playoffs
1911	Tri-State	65–46	2nd	—	Champions
1912	Tri-State	61–51	3rd	—	No playoffs
1913	Tri-State	50–61	5th	—	No playoffs
1914	Tri-State	44–66	5th	—	No playoffs

== Notable alumni ==
- Walter Moser (1907), MLB pitcher
- Charlie Rhodes (1907–1908), MLB pitcher
- Ed Poole (1907), MLB pitcher
- Billy Gilbert (1911), MLB infielder
- John Hoey (1911), MLB outfielder
- Bert Conn (1912), MLB pitcher/second baseman
- Red Owens (1913), MLB outfielder
- Charles Johnson (1912–1914), MLB outfielder (.403 batting average in 1912)
