= Herb Jackson (baseball) =

American baseball player (1883–1922)

- Pitcher
- Born: September 24, 1883; Elmira, New York, U.S.
- Died: March 18, 1922 (aged 38); Carnegie, Pennsylvania, U.S.
- Batted: Unknown Threw: Right

MLB debut
- August 11, 1905, for the Detroit Tigers

Last MLB appearance
- August 14, 1905, for the Detroit Tigers

MLB statistics
- Win–loss record: 0–2
- Earned run average: 5.73
- Strikeouts: 3
- Stats at Baseball Reference

Teams
- Detroit Tigers (1905)

Herbert Benjamin Jackson (September 24, 1883 – March 18, 1922) was an American right-handed pitcher in Major League Baseball who played for the Detroit Tigers in 1905.
