= Pennsylvania League =

- Classification: Independent (1903–1904)
- Sport: Minor League Baseball
- First season: 1903
- Folded: 1904
- President: Unknown (1903–1904)
- No. of teams: 6
- Country: United States of America
- Most titles: 1 Carlisle* (1904)

The Pennsylvania League was a six–team Independent level minor league baseball league that played in the 1903 and 1904 seasons. As reflected in the league name, the Pennsylvania League featured franchises based exclusively in Pennsylvania. The Pennsylvania League permanently folded after the 1904 season.

== History ==
The Pennsylvania League formed as Independent level minor league that played in 1903. The 1903 member teams, standings and statistics are unknown.

The 1904 Pennsylvania League continued play as a six–team Independent league. The Pennsylvania League hosted franchises based in Carlisle, Pennsylvania, Chester, Pennsylvania, Coatesville, Pennsylvania, Johnstown, Pennsylvania (Johnstown Johnnies), Oxford, Pennsylvania and Pottstown, Pennsylvania. Team records and statistics of the 1904 league are unknown.

The Pennsylvania League permanently folded after the 1904 season.

In 1905, Coatesville and the Johnstown Johnnies became charter members of the Tri-State League, which was an Independent eight–team league

== Pennsylvania League teams ==
| Team name(s) | City represented | Ballpark | Year(s) active |
|---|---|---|---|
| Carlisle | Carlisle, Pennsylvania | Unknown | 1904 |
| Chester | Chester, Pennsylvania | Union Park | 1904 |
| Coatesville | Coatesville, Pennsylvania | Unknown | 1904 |
| Johnstown Johnnies | Johnstown, Pennsylvania | Point Stadium | 1904 |
| Oxford | Oxford, Pennsylvania | Unknown | 1904 |
| Pottstown | Pottstown, Pennsylvania | Unknown | 1904 |

== Pennsylvania League overall standings ==
The 1903 and 1904 Pennsylvania League records are unknown. The order of the 1904 standings is listed as Carlisle in the first place line, followed by Chester, Coatesville, Johnstown Johnnies, Oxford and Pottstown, which is also alphabetical.

=== 1904 ===
| Team standings | W | L | PCT | GB | Managers |
|---|---|---|---|---|---|
| Carlisle | 00 | 00 | .000 | 0 | NA |
| Chester | 00 | 00 | .000 | 0 | NA |
| Coatesville | 00 | 00 | .000 | 0 | NA |
| Johnstown Johnnies | 00 | 00 | .000 | 0 | NA |
| Oxford | 00 | 00 | .000 | 0 | NA |
| Pottstown | 00 | 00 | .000 | 0 | NA |

== Notable alumni ==
- Hans Lobert (1904), Johnstown
- Jock Menefee (1904), Johnstown
- Mike Mowrey (1904), Chester
- Mike Smith (1904), Johnstown
