= John Hofford =

American baseball player (1863–1915)

- Pitcher
- Born: May 25, 1863; Philadelphia, Pennsylvania, U.S.
- Died: December 16, 1915 (aged 52); Philadelphia, Pennsylvania, U.S.
- Batted: Unknown Threw: Unknown

MLB debut
- September 26, 1885, for the Pittsburgh Alleghenys

Last MLB appearance
- July 24, 1886, for the Pittsburgh Alleghenys

MLB statistics
- Win–loss record: 3–9
- Earned run average: 4.16
- Strikeouts: 46
- Stats at Baseball Reference

Teams
- Pittsburgh Alleghenys (1885–1886)

John William Hofford (May 25, 1863 – December 16, 1915) was an American professional baseball pitcher for the Pittsburgh Alleghenys of the American Association from 1885 to 1886. He played minor league baseball for multiple clubs from 1885 to 1896.

== Biography ==
Hofford was born on May 25, 1863, in Philadelphia.

He pitched for the minor league Augusta Browns in 1885. He pitched for the Pittsburgh Alleghenys for two seasons from 1885 to 1886. Hofford and teammate Frank Ringo were released from the team by the manager Horace Phillips for "lushness".

He played minor league baseball from 1886 to 1896 for multiple teams including the Brockton Shoemakers, the Fort Worth Panthers, the Littlestown Brown Stockings, the Lynchburg Hill Climbers, the Memphis Grays, the San Antonio Cowboys, the Torrington Tornadoes, and the Utica Pent-Ups.

Hofford died on December 16, 1915, in Philadelphia. He was interred at West Laurel Hill Cemetery in Bala Cynwyd, Pennsylvania.
