= Bob Giggie =

American baseball player (1933–2018)

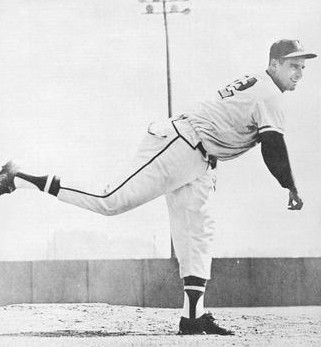
- Pitcher
- Born: August 13, 1933; Dorchester, Massachusetts, U.S.
- Died: December 9, 2018 (aged 85); Braintree, Massachusetts, U.S.
- Batted: Right Threw: Right

MLB debut
- April 18, 1959, for the Milwaukee Braves

Last MLB appearance
- July 24, 1962, for the Kansas City Athletics

MLB statistics
- Win–loss record: 3–1
- Earned run average: 5.18
- Strikeouts: 32
- Stats at Baseball Reference

Teams
- Milwaukee Braves (1959–1960); Kansas City Athletics (1960, 1962)

Robert Thomas Giggie (August 13, 1933 – December 9, 2018) was an American professional baseball player and Major League Baseball pitcher. He appeared in 30 games pitched (all but two in relief) for the Milwaukee Braves during the 1959 and 1960 seasons and the Kansas City Athletics during 1960 and 1962. Giggie threw and batted right-handed and was listed as 6 feet 1 inch (1.85 m) tall and 200 pounds (91 kg).

Bob attended Charlestown High School and was signed as an amateur by his hometown Boston Braves on July 5, 1951.

Giggie's best season in the minors was with the Hagerstown Braves in the Class B Interstate League, when he had a record of 18 wins and 7 losses, with 2.82 earned run average in 214 innings pitched.

He appeared in 16 games for the Milwaukee Braves during the 1959 and 1960 seasons. He was traded to the Kansas City Athletics on May 11, 1960, for pitcher George Brunet, then pitched in 14 games for the Athletics in 1960 and 1962.

In the major leagues, Giggie compiled a 3–1 win–loss mark and an earned run average of 5.18. In 30 games and 57 1/3 innings pitched, he allowed 70 hits and 32 bases on balls. He struck out 32 and registered one save and no complete games. He retired after the 1962 season.

He died at his home in Braintree, Massachusetts on December 9, 2018.
