= Carl McNabb =

American baseball player (1917–2007)

- Pinch hitter
- Born: January 25, 1917; Stevenson, Alabama, U.S.
- Died: July 16, 2007 (aged 90); Jasper, Tennessee, U.S.
- Batted: Right Threw: Right

MLB debut
- April 20, 1945, for the Detroit Tigers

Last MLB appearance
- April 20, 1945, for the Detroit Tigers

MLB statistics
- Batting average: .000
- At bats: 1
- Strikeouts: 1
- Stats at Baseball Reference

Teams
- Detroit Tigers (1945)

Carl Mack "Skinny" McNabb (January 25, 1917 – July 16, 2007) was an American professional baseball player. A second baseman during his fifteen-year minor league baseball career, he made one appearance in Major League Baseball for the Detroit Tigers during the 1945 season as a pinch hitter. Listed at 5'9", 155 lb., McNabb batted and threw right-handed. He was born in Stevenson, Alabama.

== Life ==
McNabb began his professional baseball career in 1936 with the Ozark Cardinals of the Alabama–Florida League. He played second base throughout his baseball career.

He was hitless in his only major league game, striking out in his only at bat, which came against Steve Gromek of the Cleveland Indians on April 20, 1945. Although he continued to play in the minor leagues until 1950, he never made it back to the majors. He later served as player-manager of the Tyler Trojans, a Cincinnati Reds affiliate team, in 1949. Overall, he had a .280 batting average with 37 home runs during his minor league career.

Following his baseball career, McNabb moved to Jasper, Tennessee, where he ran a grocery store, then became a rural mail carrier for 22 years. He was a veteran of the U.S. Army who served in World War II as a medic, and also started and coached an American Legion Baseball team in Jasper. He died at a local hospital at age 90.
