= Gene Crumling =

American baseball player (1922–2012)

- Catcher
- Born: April 5, 1922; Wrightsville, Pennsylvania, U.S.
- Died: February 11, 2012 (aged 89); Yorkana, Pennsylvania, U.S.
- Batted: Right Threw: Right

MLB debut
- September 11, 1945

Last MLB appearance
- September 29, 1945

MLB statistics
- Games played: 6
- At bats: 12
- Hits: 1
- RBI: 1
- Batting average: .083

Teams
- St. Louis Cardinals (1945)

Eugene Leon Crumling (April 5, 1922 – February 11, 2012) was an American backup catcher in Major League Baseball who played for the St. Louis Cardinals during the 1945 season. Listed at 6 ft 0 in (1.83 m), 180 lb., he batted and threw right-handed.

Crumling was one of many ballplayers who only appeared in the majors during World War II. He joined the Cardinals late in the 1945 season, as part of a catching tandem that included Ken O'Dea, Del Rice and Walker Cooper. He posted a .083 batting average in six games.

He also played for eight Minor league teams from 1941 through 1952, hitting a .236 average in 895 games.

Besides this, he managed for three seasons in the Interstate League (1948, 1951) and the Pennsylvania–Ontario–New York League (1952).

Crumling died in Yorkana, Pennsylvania, at the age of 89.
