= Bill Farmer (baseball) =

American baseball player (1864–1928)

- Catcher
- Born: February 27, 1864; Philadelphia, Pennsylvania, U.S.
- Died: February 9, 1928 (aged 63); Philadelphia, Pennsylvania, U.S.
- Batted: Right Threw: Right

MLB debut
- May 1, 1888, for the Pittsburgh Alleghenys

Last MLB appearance
- August 24, 1888, for the Philadelphia Athletics

MLB statistics
- Batting average: .125
- Hits: 2
- Runs: 0
- Home Runs: 0
- Stats at Baseball Reference

Teams
- As player: Pittsburgh Alleghenys (1888); Philadelphia Athletics (1888)

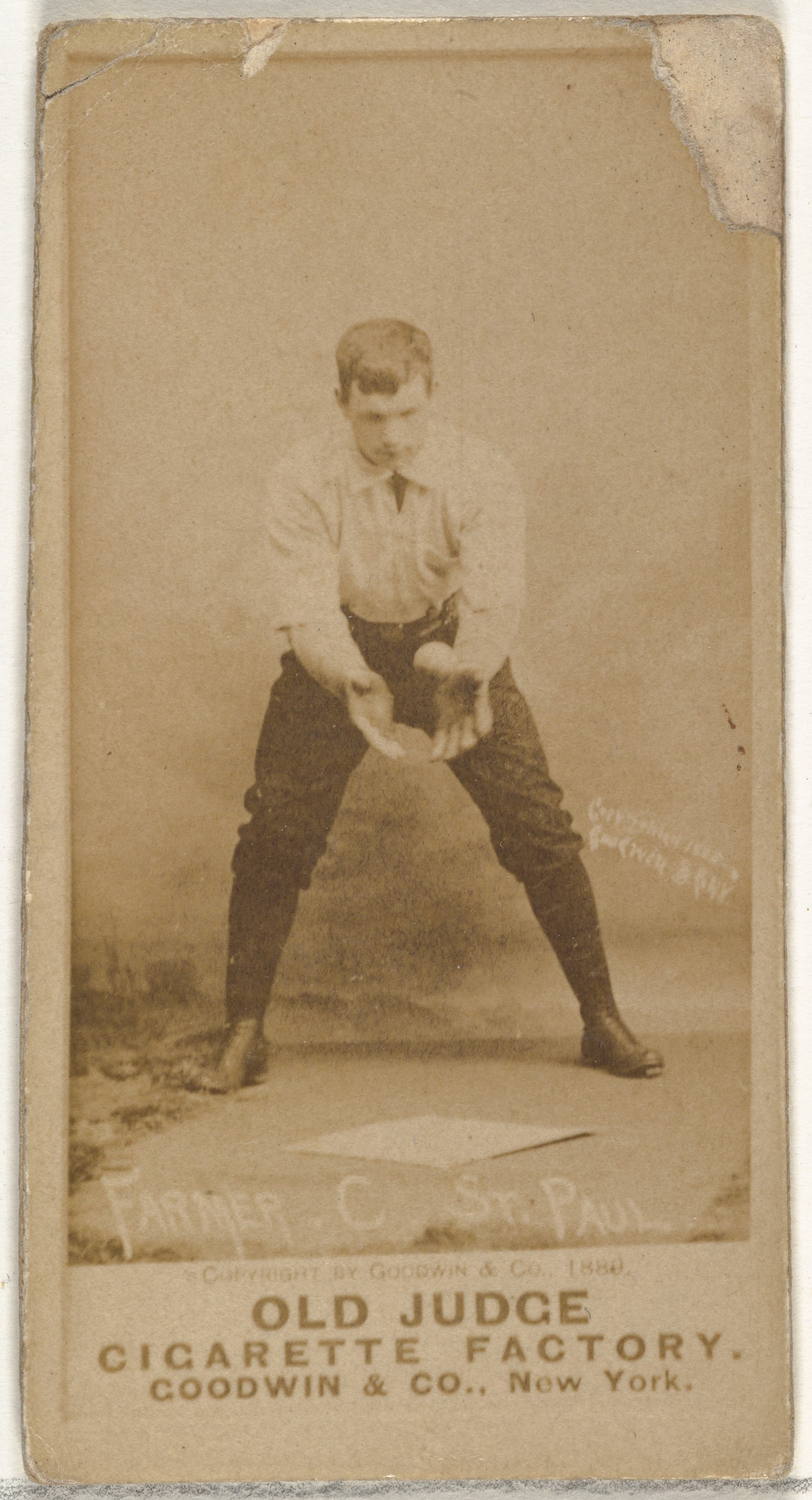
Bill Farmer, 1889

William Charles Farmer (February 27, 1864 – February 9, 1928) was an American professional baseball player who played catcher in the major leagues in 1888 Pittsburgh Alleghenys of the National League and the Philadelphia Athletics of the American Association. He later played for the St. Paul Apostles of the Western Association in 1889 and 1890.
