= Frank Berkelbach =

American baseball player (1853–1932)

- Outfielder
- Born: July 27, 1853; Philadelphia, Pennsylvania, U.S.
- Died: June 10, 1932 (aged 78); Merchantville, New Jersey, U.S.
- Batted: Unknown Threw: Unknown

MLB debut
- July 4, 1884, for the Cincinnati Red Stockings

Last MLB appearance
- July 12, 1884, for the Cincinnati Red Stockings

MLB statistics
- At bats: 25
- RBI: 3
- Home Runs: 0
- Batting average: .240
- Stats at Baseball Reference

Teams
- Cincinnati Red Stockings (1884)

Frank Pierce Berkelbach (July 27, 1853 – June 10, 1932) was an American professional baseball player who played outfield for the 1884 Cincinnati Red Stockings.
