= Trenton Giants =

- 1936–1950; Trenton, New Jersey

Minor league affiliations
- Previous classes: Class B (1940–1950); Class C (1939); Class A (1936–1938)
- League: Interstate League (1939–1950); Eastern League (1938); New York–Pennsylvania League (1936–1937)

Major league affiliations
- Previous teams: New York Giants (1946–1950); Brooklyn Dodgers (1944–1945); Philadelphia Phillies (1942–1943); Washington Senators (1937–1938)

Minor league titles
- League titles: 2 (1948, 1949)

Team data
- Previous names: Trenton Giants (1946–1950); Trenton Spartans (1945); Trenton Packers (1942–1944); Trenton Senators (1936–1941)

The Trenton Giants were a minor league baseball team, based in Trenton, New Jersey that played under several different names from 1936–1950. The team began when the York White Roses moved to Trenton on July 2, 1936 and became the Trenton Senators.

During their existence they were affiliates with the Washington Senators, Philadelphia Phillies, Brooklyn Dodgers and New York Giants. Baseball Hall of Fame member Willie Mays made his minor league baseball debut with the Giants on June 24, 1950 in a game against the Hagerstown Braves in Hagerstown, Maryland. Mays recalls in his autobiography making a catch with Trenton he thinks was "even more fun to watch" than "The Catch" he made in the 1954 World Series. "Lou Haymen of Wilmington hit a shot to dead center, right at the 405-foot sign. I ran back, jumped, and caught it bare-handed just as it was going over. I bounced off the fence and threw the ball on the fly all the way to home plate. Nobody knew about it because it was just another game in a small town."
