= Wilmington Blue Rocks (1940–1952) =

- 1940–1952; Wilmington, Delaware

Minor league affiliations
- Class: Class B (1940–1952)
- League: Interstate League (1940–1952)

Major league affiliations
- Team: Philadelphia Phillies (1944–1952); Philadelphia Athletics (1940–1943)

Minor league titles
- League titles (4): 1942; 1947; 1950; 1951

Team data
- Name: Wilmington Blue Rocks (1940–1952)
- Ballpark: Wilmington Park (1940–1952)

The Wilmington Blue Rocks were a minor league baseball team based in Wilmington, Delaware, playing in the Interstate League from 1940 to 1952. The nickname "Blue Rocks" came from 73-year-old Robert Miller in a name-the-team contest. Miller lived in the Henry Clay section of the city, famed for its blue granite found along the Brandywine River. The current Wilmington Blue Rocks were named in 1992 for this original franchise.

In 1940, Bob Carpenter founded the original Wilmington Blue Rocks in partnership with Connie Mack as a Class B Interstate League affiliate of Mack's Philadelphia A's. In 1943, the Carpenter family bought the Philadelphia Phillies, and before the 1944 season they bought out Mack's interest and made the Blue Rocks an affiliate of the Phillies. The Phillies purchased the club outright in March 1945.

The Blue Rocks played multiple mid-season exhibition games in Wilmington against major league clubs. The Blue Rocks went 2–2 against the Phillies, winning, 5–1, on August 23, 1943, and 9–3 on June 5, 1944, and losing, 7–4, on July 8, 1947, and 5–3 on July 11, 1951.

The Blue Rocks played in Wilmington Park at 30th Street and Governor Printz Boulevard. Some 7,000 fans attended the Blue Rocks' first game at the ballpark in 1940 and the club established a Class B attendance record in 1940 with 145,643 attending ballgames at Wilmington Park. The club topped that mark with 172,531 fans in 1944. The single game attendance record for the Blue Rocks was set in 1947 when 7,062 fans saw Curt Simmons' Wilmington debut. By 1950 attendance for the season had dropped to 38,678. Although 1951 saw a slight improvement to 43,135, attendance declined again in 1952, which proved to be the last season both for the Interstate League and this incarnation of the Blue Rocks.
