= Lancaster Red Roses =

- 1884–1961; (1884–1886, 1889–1890, 1894–1902, 1905–1914, 1932, 1940–1961); Lancaster, Pennsylvania
Team logo
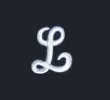
Cap insignia

Minor league affiliations
- Previous classes: Class-A (1958–1961); Class-B (1940–1955); Class D (1932); Class B (1907–1912, 1914); Class D (1901–1902); Class A (1899); Class B (1897–1898); Class A (1896); Class B (1895–1896)
- League: Eastern League (1958–1961)
- Previous leagues: Piedmont League (1954–1955); Interstate League (1932, 1940–1952); Tri-State League (1905–1912, 1914); Pennsylvania State League (1901–1902); Atlantic League (1896–1899); Pennsylvania State League (1894–1896); Eastern Interstate League (1890); Middle States League (1889); Pennsylvania State Association (1886); Keystone Association (1884–1885); Eastern League (1884–1885)

Major league affiliations
- Previous teams: St. Louis Cardinals (1961); Chicago Cubs (1959–1961); Detroit Tigers (1958–1959); Philadelphia/ Kansas City Athletics (1954–1955); Brooklyn Dodgers (1948–1952); Philadelphia Athletics (1944–1947); Boston Red Sox (1932)

Minor league titles
- League titles: 6 (1909),(1940),(1943),(1944),(1945),(1955)

Team data
- Previous names: Lancaster Red Roses (1940–1961); Lancaster Red Sox (1932); Lancaster Red Roses (1914); Lancaster Lanks (1912); Lancaster Red Roses (1905–1911); Lancaster (1901–1902); Lancaster Maroons (1896–1899); Lancaster Chicks (1894–1895); Lancaster (1889–1890); Lancaster Ironsides (1886); Lancaster Red Stockings (1885); Lancaster Ironsides (1884–1885); Lancaster (1884)
- Previous parks: Stumpf Field

The Lancaster Red Roses baseball team, originally known as the Maroons, changed its name at the start of the 1906 season during a bitter match with the York, Pennsylvania-based White Roses. Some sources indicate that the rival teams were named for the opposing factions in England's historic Wars of the Roses. The Lancaster Red Roses played at Stumpf Field in Manheim Township, Pennsylvania, which is still used today by local baseball and softball leagues.

== History ==
=== 19th century ===
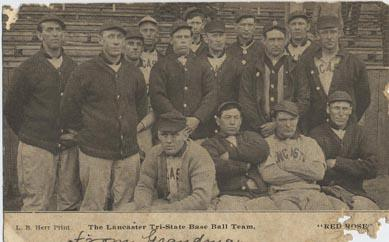
The 1906 Lancaster Red Roses

Organized baseball first came to Lancaster, Pennsylvania in 1884 when Lancaster had two teams for a brief period of time. The Lancaster Red Stockings played 19 games as a member of the short-lived Keystone Association before the league broke up in June 1884. The Lancaster Ironsides played in the Eastern League beginning in 1884. The team remained in Lancaster for the 1885 season under a new name, the Lancaster Lancasters. Baseball returned for Lancaster in the 1894 season when the Pennsylvania State League Altoona, Pennsylvania franchise moved to Lancaster for most of the 1894 season and the 1895 season.

In 1896, the Atlantic League Lancaster Maroons began play when the New Haven, Connecticut team moved to Lancaster. The Maroons became very popular and became one of the powerhouse teams in the Atlantic League. On field successes didn't save the franchise, due to player salaries being higher than the team income. The team folded at the end of the 1899 season.

=== 20th century ===
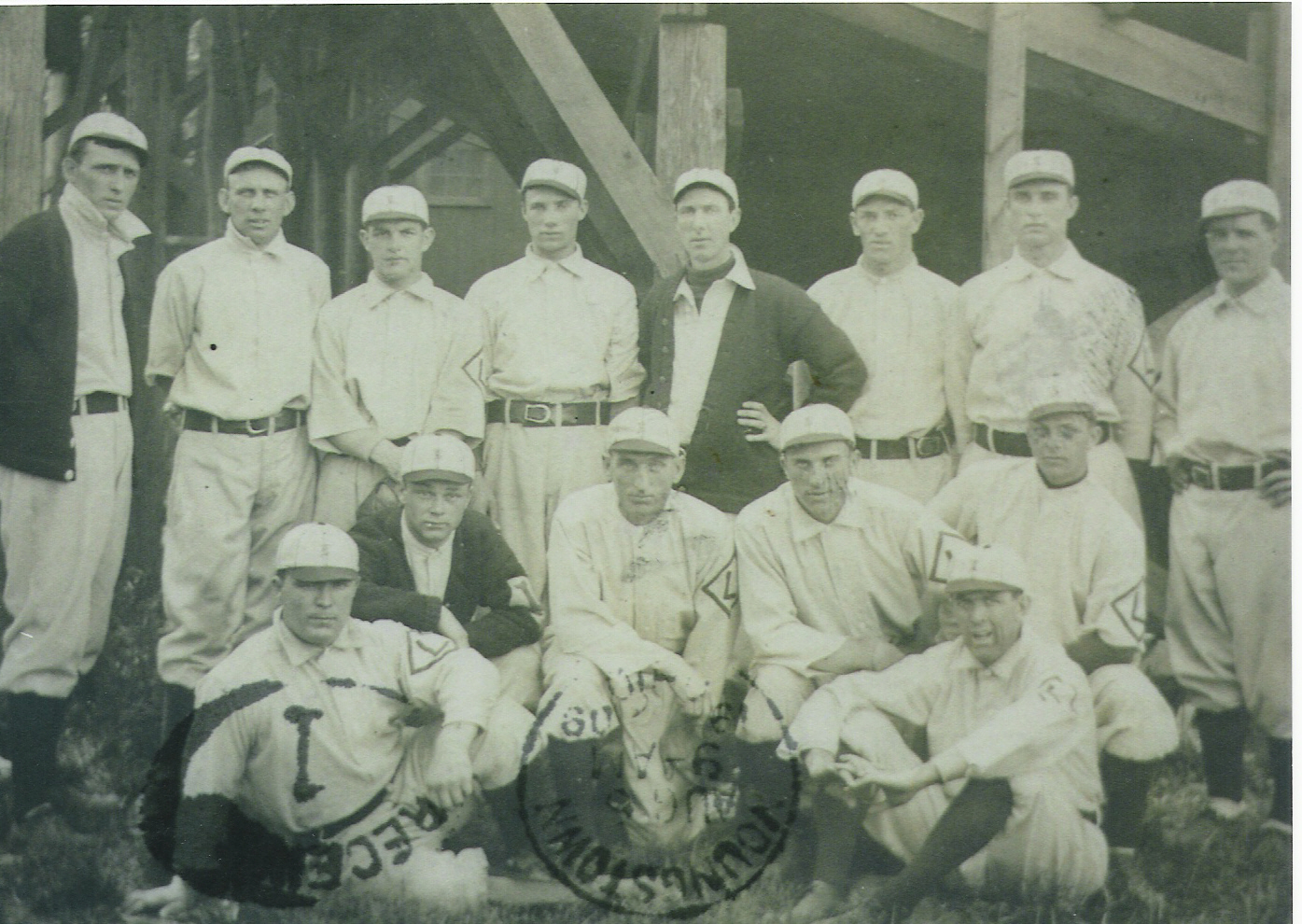
The 1909 Lancaster Red Roses with Stan Coveleski standing fourth from left

In 1904, a local businessman built a new ballpark and began an independent team to test the local demand for baseball. After a success with local fans and businesses the team joined the Tri-State League for the 1905 season as the Lancaster Maroons. The franchise became the Red Roses in 1906.

In 1906, the Lancaster Red Roses changed their name from the Maroons, and its new name was unveiled to the public a few days before the season and drew heavy criticism from the rival York White Roses from nearby York. The White Roses manager predicted, in spite, that the Red Roses would be at the bottom of the standings column. The Red Roses went on to win the first game, 9-4, and an even heavier rivalry began. Some sources indicate that the rival teams were named for the opposing factions in England's historic Wars of the Roses.

In 1909, the team secured its first championship in the Tri-State League, under the leadership of ex-outfielder Marty Hogan. That same year, the Red Roses signed on future Hall of Fame pitcher Stan Coveleski.

In 1932, a new team by the name of the Lancaster Red Sox, an affiliate of the Boston Red Sox, played in the city but the economic problems related to the Great Depression lead to the team folding on June 17, 1932 after only 23 games in the 1932 season. The league disbanded a few days later on the 20th. The league returned in 1939 with only 4 teams and the Lancaster Red Roses followed in 1940 entering the league with four other teams doubling the league. The team returned to its original name of Red Roses in 1940. The Lancaster Red Roses played in the Interstate League from 1940 to 1952, and were affiliated with the Philadelphia Athletics from 1944 to 1947 and the Brooklyn Dodgers from 1948 to 1952.

The Red Roses joined the Piedmont League in 1954, and were affiliated with the Philadelphia/Kansas City Athletics from 1954–1955 season. They became members of the Eastern League in 1958, and were affiliated with the Detroit Tigers for the 1958–1959 season, the Chicago Cubs from 1959 to 1961, and spent their last season ever in 1961 as an affiliate of the St. Louis Cardinals.

== Uniforms ==
The Lancaster Maroons unveiled new uniforms with new colors, this was soon followed by a name change to the Lancaster Red Roses Original Uniforms included white shirt and pants, dark blue stockings, and dark blue cap with a white "L" embroidered across the front.

== Year-by-year record ==
=== Tri-State League (1906–1912, 1914) records ===
Year	Record	Finish	Manager	Playoffs	Notes
1906	70-57	3rd	Fred Crolius	none	
1907	73-53	3rd	Pop Foster	none	
1908	72-55	3rd	Pop Foster	none	
1909	75-39	1st	Marty Hogan	none League Champs	
1910	63-47	2nd	Marty Hogan	none	
1911	54-54	4th	Marty Hogan		
1912	15-19 (59-92 overall)	--	John Castle	none	Lancaster moved to Atlantic City June 18
1914	10-46 (26-83 overall)	6th	George Heckert / Eddie Hooper	none	York (16-37) moved to Lancaster July 8

=== Interstate League (1940–1952) ===
Year	Record	Finish	Manager	Playoffs	Notes
1940	43-39 (62-56 overall)	4th	Cy Perkins	League Champs	Hazleton (19-17) moved to Lancaster June 12
1941	43-83	8th	Billy Rogell / Jimmy Archer		
1942	59-78	5th	Tom Oliver		
1943	83-55	1st	Elwood Wheaton	League Champs	
1944	66-72	4th	Lena Blackburne	League Champs	
1945	87-52	1st	Lena Blackburne	League Champs	
1946	55-83	8th	Tom Oliver		
1947	64-73	6th	Charlie English / Clayton Sheedy		
1948	50-89	8th	Dib Williams / Jack Knight (interim, 5/29-?)		
1949	71-68	5th	Al Campanis		
1950	56-82	7th	Ed Head		
1951	71-67	5th	Ed Head		
1952	75-65	4th	James Bivin	Lost League Finals	

=== Piedmont League (1954–1955) ===
Year	Record	Finish	Manager	Playoffs	Notes
1954	62-78	7th	Kemp Wicker / Lena Blackburne / Buddy Walker		
1955	72-54	2nd	Hank Biasatti	League Champs	

=== Eastern League (1958–1961) ===
1958	75-57	1st	Johnny Pesky	Lost League Finals
1959	57-83	7th	Nick Cullop	
1960	66-73	6th	Phil Cavarretta	
1961	60-80	5th	Chase Riddle	none

== Notable Red Roses ==
- Stan Coveleski, Baseball Hall of Famer
- Nellie Fox, Baseball Hall of Famer
- George Kell, Baseball Hall of Famer
- Walter Moser, major league pitcher

== See also ==
- Lancaster Barnstormers
