= York White Roses =

- 1884–1969; (1884, 1893, 1896, 1909–1914, 1923–1933, 1943–1955, 1958–1969); York, Pennsylvania

Minor league affiliations
- Previous classes: Single-A (1884–1969)
- League: Eastern League (1958–1969); Piedmont League (1953–1955); Interstate League (1943–1952); New York–Penn League (1923–1933); Tri-State League (1909–1914); Pennsylvania-New Jersey League (1908); Cumberland Valley League (1896); Pennsylvania State League (1893); Eastern League (1884); Keystone Association (1884)

Major league affiliations
- Previous teams: Pittsburgh Pirates (1968–1969); Washington Senators (1963–1967); Boston Red Sox (1962); St. Louis Cardinals (1958–1959); Baltimore Orioles (1954–1955); St. Louis Browns (1952–1953); Pittsburgh Pirates (1943–1950); Brooklyn Dodgers (1933)

Minor league titles
- League titles: 2 (1925), (1969)

Team data
- Previous names: York Pirates (1968–1969); York White Roses (1962-1967); York White Roses (1958-1959); York White Roses (1943-1955); York Bees (1940); York White Roses (1923-1933); York White Roses (1909-1913); York White Roses (1905-1907); York Penn Parks (1904); York White Roses (1884–1899)
- Previous parks: Bob Hoffman Stadium

The York White Roses was the name of a minor league baseball team based in the city of York, Pennsylvania, US, that existed between 1894 and 1969.

== History ==
=== Early years ===
The York White Roses began as members of the short-lived Keystone Association in 1884. The league disbanded after only 20 games. The White Roses transferred to the Eastern League after the Harrisburg Olympics folded. The team remained in the Eastern League until the 1893 season when York joined the Pennsylvania State League.

=== Turn of the 20th century ===
York joined the Tri-State League as the York Penn Parks in 1904. York defeated Williamsport before 3,500 fans at the Phillies' ball park in Philadelphia for the new league's first championship.

The name was quickly changed back to White Roses for the 1905 season. The 1906 season was full of controversy when the rival Lancaster Maroons changed their name to the Red Roses. George Heckert, White Roses manager, publicly denounced Lancaster's team and predicted that Lancaster would end the season in last place after it unveiled new jerseys and a new name days before the season opener against York. Yorkers viewed the change as a copycat maneuver since York had called itself the White Roses since 1884. The Red Roses went on to win the first game, 9–4, and an even heavier rivalry began. Some sources indicate that the rival teams were named for the opposing factions in England's Wars of the Roses.

In 1907, the York franchise was moved to Reading, Pennsylvania, and became the Reading Pretzels for the 1908 season. In 1908 a York team played as members of the Pennsylvania-New Jersey League. The White Roses returned to York for the 1909 season. They made another move in 1914 when rival Lancaster Red Roses moved to Atlantic City. After a bad start to the season in York, the White Roses moved to Lancaster and became the Red Roses for the second half of the 1914 season. The franchise remained in Lancaster until The Tri State league broke up at the end of the 1914 season.

=== New era of White Roses ===
York is one of the six original teams of the New York–Pennsylvania League, joining for the inaugural season in 1923. The White Roses quickly became one of the powerhouse franchises in the League and won their first league championship on September 25, 1925, defeating the Williamsport Grays 5–3, in 11 innings in the fourth and final game of a best-of-five series. York first baseman Del Bissonette homered in the bottom of the 11th to clinch the title.

The White Roses were unaffiliated until the 1933 season when they became part of the Brooklyn Dodgers minor league system. Financial hardships due to the Great Depression caused this version of the White Roses to fold after the 1933 season. The team came out of the dark in 1936 when the Harrisburg Senators were forced to relocate after the 1935 season. The stay in York was brief, as the franchise moved mid-season, becoming the Trenton Senators on July 2, 1936.

The White Roses joined the Interstate League in 1943, spending most of their seasons in this league (1943–1952) as an affiliate of the Pittsburgh Pirates until 1950. From 1953 to 1955, the White Roses were members of the Piedmont League, affiliated with the St. Louis Browns from 1952 to 1953 and the Baltimore Orioles from 1954 to 1955. Hall of Fame player Brooks Robinson played his first professional season for the 1955 White Roses.

The White Roses re-joined the Eastern League, affiliated with the St. Louis Cardinals, in the 1958 season and played there until the end of the 1959 season. The York White Roses returned in 1962 as a member of the Eastern League, as the Johnstown Red Sox moved to York. The Boston Red Sox affiliation lasted only that season. They were affiliated with the Washington Senators from 1963 to 1967.

=== York Pirates ===
Team logo as the York Pirates in the late 1960s

In 1968, the team was renamed as the York Pirates, affiliated once again with the Pittsburgh franchise / team. Sunday, April 21, 1968, marked a historic event in York baseball history when the York Pirates and Reading Phillies (of nearby Reading, Pennsylvania) played the first outdoor game on artificial turf at York's old Veterans Memorial Stadium. York lost 5–3 but the 6,248 audience was also the largest crowd in York's minor-league baseball history.

The 1969 season was unfortunately the last season of York minor-league baseball in the 20th century. After many dismal losing seasons in the 1960s the York Pirates made it to the Finals against the Pittsfield Red Sox of Massachusetts. Pittsfield won the first game of the series 7–4 but the remaining games of the Championship were rained out and York was named champions (York was in first place in the league that season).

== Stadium ==
The White Roses had numerous ballparks during the first half of the 20th century. In 1947, York moved its minor-league team from Memorial Field in West York, Pennsylvania, to Memorial Stadium in York. York's minor-league clubs continued to play at Veterans Memorial Stadium/Bob Hoffman Stadium until the York Pirates folded at the end of the 1969 season.

== Notable alumni ==
=== Hall of Fame alumni ===
- Brooks Robinson (1937-2023), also played third base for the Baltimore Orioles, 1955-1977, Inducted 1983

=== Other notable alumni ===
- Clyde Barnhart (1931)
- Dick Bosman (1965–1966) 1969 AL ERA Title
- Boom-Boom Beck (1946)
- Joe Coleman (1966–1967) MLB All-Star
- Ripper Collins (1923) 3 x MLB All-Star
- Tito Francona (1952) MLB All-Star
- Lonny Frey (1932) 3 x MLB All-Star
- Jim Lemon (1964) 2 x MLB All-Star
- Dutch Leonard (1933) 5 x MLB All-Star
- Jack McKeon (1950) 2 x NL Manager of The Year (1999, 2003); Manager: 2003 World Series Champion Florida Marlins
- Mel Parnell (1962) 2 x MLB All-Star
- Ken Raffensberger (1955) MLB All-Star
- Dave Robertson (1928) 2 x NL Home Run Leader (1916–1917)
- Dick Siebert (1933) MLB All-Star
- Del Unser (1966–1967)
- Buck Weaver (1910) Black Sox Scandal
- Wilbur Wood (1962) 3 x MLB All-Star

== Year-by-year records ==
=== Keystone Association (1884) ===
Year	Record	Finish	Manager	Playoffs	Notes
1884	10–10	2nd	Frank Burnham	none	Keystone Association disbanded June 7

=== Eastern League (1884) ===
Year	Record	Finish	Manager	Playoffs	Notes
	10–21	5th	John Murphy	none	York replaced the disbanded Harrisburg team July 18

=== Pennsylvania State League (1893) ===
Year	Record	Finish	Manager	Playoffs	Notes
1893	51–55	6th	William Stevens / Bill Sharsig		

=== Tri-State League (1909–1914) ===
Year	Record	Finish	Manager	Playoffs	Notes
1909	41–73	8th	Frank Reisling / William Poole	none	
1910	37–74	8th	Louis Simmel / Jacob Weitzel / Curt Weigand	none	
1911	50–58	6th	Curt Weigand	none	
1912	45–65	7th	John Manning	none	
1913	59–52	4th	George Heckert	none	
1914	16–37	–	George Heckert / Eddie Hooper		York moved to Lancaster (10–46) July 8

=== New York–Penn League (1923–1933, 1936) ===
Year	Record	Finish	Manager	Playoffs	Notes
1923	73–51	2nd	Rube Dessau	none	
1924	80–48	2nd	Rube Dessau	none	
1925	77–55	1st (t)	Rube Dessau	League Champs	
1926	79–57	2nd	Rube Dessau	none	
1927	79–58	3rd	Rube Dessau / Johnny Tillman	none	
1928	65–72	5th	Win Clark	none	
1929	71–66	4th	Jack Bentley	none	
1930	66–73	6th	Jack Bentley	none	
1931	73–67	5th	Jack Bentley / Frank Uzmann	none	
1932	72–66	3rd	Russ Wrightstone / Rube Dessau	none	
1933	59–78	8th	Rube Dessau	none	
1936	24–45	–	Dutch Dorman / Walter Smallwood		York moved to Trenton (16–54) July 2

=== Interstate League (1943–1952) ===
Year	Record	Finish	Manager	Playoffs	Notes
1943	73–66	4th	Bunny Griffiths	Lost League Finals	
1944	69–68	3rd	Bunny Griffiths	Lost in 1st round	
1945	49–90	6th	Bunny Griffiths		
1946	68–70	5th	Boom-Boom Beck		
1947	67–70	5th	Edward Turchin		
1948	77–62	3rd	Frank Oceak	Lost League Finals	
1949	66–72	6th	Frank Oceak		
1950	65–73	6th	Frank Oceak		
1951	51–88	7th	Joe Bowman / Edward Waleski / Eugene Crumling		
1952	74–62	3rd	Jim Crandall	Lost in 1st round	

=== Piedmont League (1953–1955) ===
Year	Record	Finish	Manager	Playoffs	Notes
1953	59–70	5th	Mark Christman / Bill Enos / George Hausmann		
1954	72–67	3rd	George Staller	Lost in 1st round	
1955	64–65	3rd	George Staller	Lost in 1st round	

=== Eastern League (1958–1969) ===
Year	Record	Finish	Manager	Playoffs	Notes
1958	68–61	3rd	Joe Schultz	Lost in 1st round	
1959	59–81	6th	Mike Ryba / Ed Lyons		
1963	63–77	5th	Danny O'Connell / Johnny Schaive	none	
1964	55–85	6th	Jim Lemon	none	
1965	67–72	3rd	Billy Klaus	none	
1966	62–77	6th	Billy Klaus	none	
1967	43–95	8th	Billy Klaus / George Case		
1968	58–82	5th	Joe Morgan		
1969	89–50	1st	Joe Morgan	* League Champs	

- *1969– Playoffs Rained out, York Pirates named Eastern League Champions

== See also ==
- York Revolution
- Lancaster Red Roses
- Baltimore Orioles
- History of the Baltimore Orioles
- Baltimore Memorial Stadium
- Eastern League (1938–present)
- Piedmont League
- Interstate League
- New York–Penn League
- Tri-State League
- Pennsylvania State League
- Eastern League (1884–1887)
- Sports in Pennsylvania
- Minor League Baseball
- Major League Baseball
- National League (baseball)
- American League
