= Waynesboro Red Birds =

- 1920–1930; Waynesboro, Pennsylvania

Minor league affiliations
- Class: Class D (1920–1930)
- League: Blue Ridge League (1920–1930)

Major league affiliations
- Team: St. Louis Cardinals (1925, 1928–1930)

Minor league titles
- League titles (0): None
- Conference titles (1): 1930
- Wild card berths (1): 1930

Team data
- Name: Waynesboro Villagers (1920–1924); Waynesboro Cardinals (1925); Waynesboro Villagers (1926–1927); Waynesboro Red Birds (1928–1930)
- Ballpark: E-B Park (1920–1930)

The Waynesboro Red Birds were a minor league baseball team based in Waynesboro, Pennsylvania. From 1920 to 1930, the Waynesboro Red Birds, "Cardinals" and "Villagers" teams played exclusively as members of the Class D level Blue Ridge League. The Waynesboro "Cardinals" and Red Birds were a minor league affiliate of the St. Louis Cardinals in 1925 and again from 1928 to 1930. Waynesville hosted home minor league games at E-B Park.

== History ==
The 1920 Waynesboro Villagers were the first minor league baseball team based in Waynesboro, Pennsylvania, as the Villagers became members of the reformed Class D level six–team Blue Ridge League. The league reformed after not playing the 1919 season and Waynesboro replaced the Gettysburg Ponies franchise in the 1920 league.

On May 19, 1920, Waynesboro won their opening day game at home, an 11-9 victory over the Hanover Raiders.

In their first season of play, Waynesboro finished the 1920 season with a 53–42 record to place third in the Blue Ridge League. The Villagers manager was Bill "Country" Morris, who would manage the team through the 1923 season. Waynesboro finished 2.5 games behind the first place Hagerstown Champs in the final standings as the league had no playoffs until 1926. Harold Yordy of Waynesboro led the Blue Ridge League in home runs with 12 and Lefty Clarke had a league leading 150 strikeouts.

Continuing play in 1921, the Waynesboro Villagers placed third in the six–team Blue Ridge League. Waynesboro ended the season with a record of 52–45 to finish 6.5 games behind the 1st place Frederick Hustlers, playing under returning manager Bill Morris. Wally Kimmick led the Blue Ridge League with 20 home runs, 47 stolen bases and 146 hits, while Alan "Lefty" Clarke led the circuit both with 25 wins and 258 strikeouts.

In 1922, the Villagers placed second in the Blue Ridge League final standings. With a 56–42 record in the six–team league, Waynesboro finished in second place, 9.5 games behind the first place Martinsburg Blue Sox under returning manager Bill Morris. Beginning in 1922 and continuing through 1927, the champion of the Blue Ridge League played the champion of the Eastern Shore League in a championship playoff called the "Five-State Championship Series". Waynesboro teams did not advance to any of the playoffs.

The 1923 Waynesboro Villagers again placed second in the Blue Ridge League standings. The Villagers finished with a record of 52–45. Playing their final full season under manager Bill Morris, Waynesboro finished 15.0 games behind the first place Martinsburg Blue Sox.

In 1924, the unaffiliated Waynesboro Villagers finished last in the Blue Ridge League. The villagers ended the season with a record of 39–56 to place sixth, playing the season under managers Joe Ward and Joe Conti and finishing 19.0 games behind the champion Martinsburg Blue Sox. Jackson Mathews of Waynesboro led the Blue Ridge League with 115 strikeouts.

Waynesboro became an affiliate of the St. Louis Cardinals for the 1925 season. The "Waynesboro Cardinals" finished the 1925 season with a record of 47–49 to place fourth in the six–team Blue Ridge League. Under manager John Breckenridge, the Cardinals finished 16.0 games behind the first place Hagerstown Hubs in the final standings. George Hammen of Waynesboro led the Blue Ridge in hitting with a batting average of .375 and topped the circuit with 141 hits.

Waynesboro returned to the "Villagers" nickname as an unaffiliated team in 1926 and finished last in the league standings. With a regular season record of 34–59, Waynesboro placed sixth, finishing 29.0 games behind the first place Hagerstown Hubs. The team was managed by Ed Greene, William Suhre and the returning Bill Morris.

The 1927 Waynesboro Villagers finished the season with a record of 41–57. The Villagers placed fifth in the Blue Ridge League, playing under managers John Perrin and John Ebert. Waynesboro ended the season 23.5 games behind the first place Chambersburg Maroons in the final standings.

Waynesboro again became a St. Louis Cardinals affiliate in 1928, as the newly named Waynesboro Red Birds finished last in the Blue Ridge League standings. The Red Birds ended the regular season with a record of 37–58 to place sixth in the six–team league. Managed by Ed Miller and Harold Funk, Waynesboro finished 21.0 games behind the first place Hanover Raiders in the final standings. Beginning in 1928, the Blue Ridge League champion was matched in a championship series with the champion of the Middle Atlantic League in the "Tri-State Series." Waynesboro did not advance to play in this series.

The 1929 Waynesboro Red Birds finished last in the Blue Ridge League for the second consecutive season. Waynesboro finished the regular season with a record of 40–69 to place sixth in the six–team Blue Ridge League. Under managers Ken Kirkham and Irwin Wimer, Waynesboro finished the season 11.0 games behind the first place Martinsburg Blue Sox in the final standings.

In their final season of play, the 1930 Waynesboro Red Birds reached the Blue Ridge League playoffs. As the Blue Ridge League compacted to four teams, Waynesboro finished the regular season with an overall record of 56–57 to place second in the standings under manager Bob Rice. The Red Birds ended the regular season 13.0 games behind the first place Chambersburg Young Yanks. As the two teams tied for the first half title, they met in the playoffs. Waynesboro lost to Chambersburg in the Blue Ridge League playoff 2 games to 1.

The Blue Ridge League folded following the 1930 season, greatly affected by the stock market crash of 1929. Waynesboro, Pennsylvania has not hosted another minor league team.

== The ballpark ==
Waynesboro minor league teams were noted to have played home games exclusively at E-B Park. On September 22, 1920, E-B Park hosted an exhibition game featuring the Baltimore Orioles with Lefty Grove, champions of the International League, against a team of Blue Ridge League All–Stars. The game ended in a 5–5 tie after 9–innings with 1,500 in attendance.

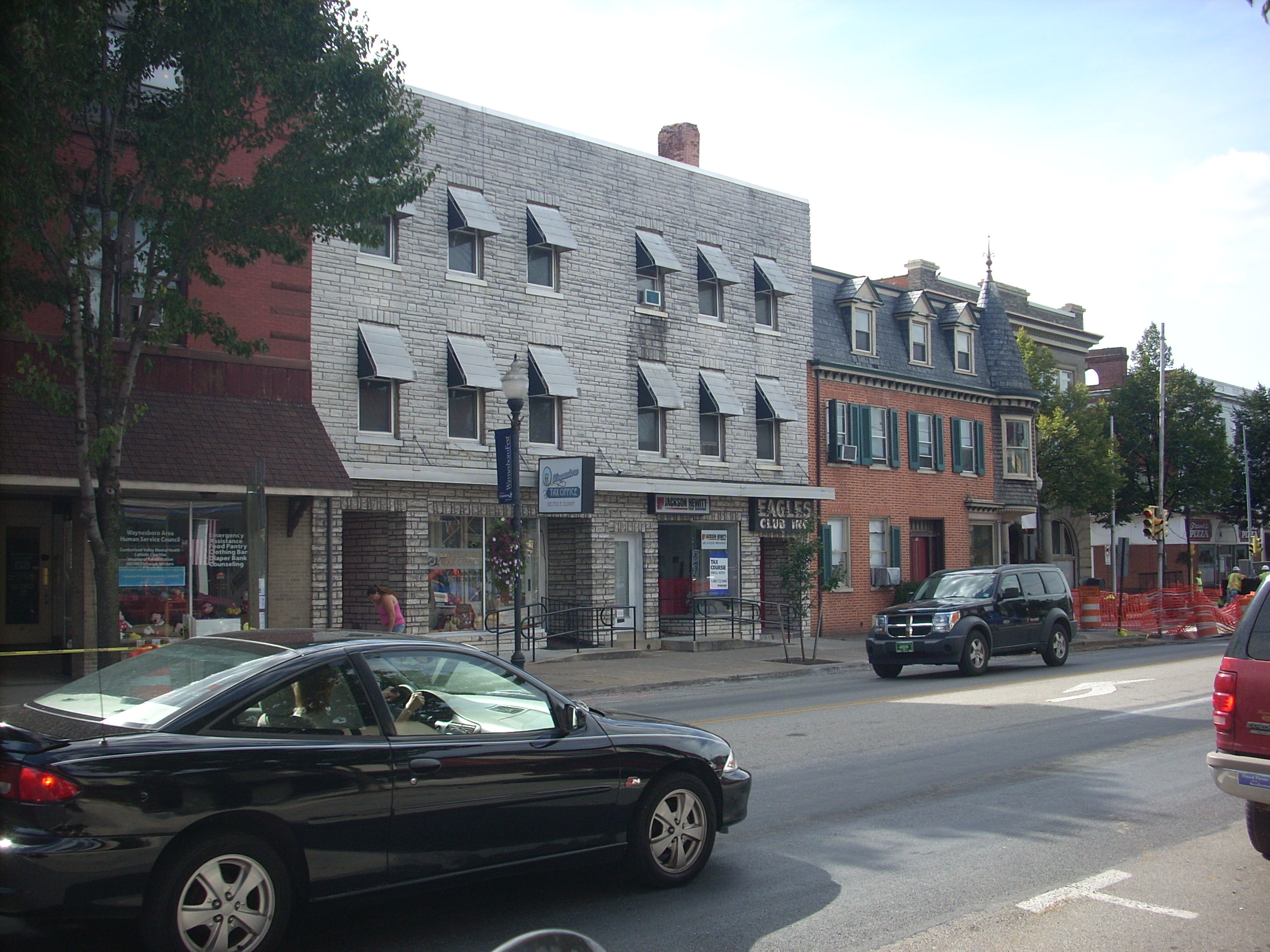
(2009) Waynesboro, Pennsylvania

== Timeline ==
Year(s)	# Yrs.	Team	Level	League	Affiliate	Ballpark
1920–1924	5	Waynesboro Villagers	Class D	Blue Ridge League	None	E-B Park
1925	1	Waynesboro Cardinals	Class D	Blue Ridge League	St. Louis Cardinals	E-B Park
1926–1927	2	Waynesboro Villagers	Class D	Blue Ridge League	None	E-B Park
1928–1930	3	Waynesboro Red Birds	Class D	Blue Ridge League	St. Louis Cardinals	E-B Park

== Year–by–year records ==
Year	Record	Finish	Manager	Playoffs/Notes
1920	53–42	3rd	Bill Morris	No playoffs held
1921	52–45	3rd	Bill Morris	No playoffs held
1922	56–42	2nd	Bill Morris	No playoffs held
1923	52–45	2nd	Bill Morris	No playoffs held
1924	39–56	6th	Joe Ward / Joe Conti	No playoffs held
1925	47–49	4th	John Breckenridge	No playoffs held
1926	34–59	6th	Ed Greene; William Suhre / Bill Morris	Did not qualify
1927	41–57	5th	John Perrin / John Ebert	Did not qualify
1928	37–58	6th	Ed Miller / Harold Funk	Did not qualify
1929	40–69	6th	Ken Kirkham / Irwin Wimer	Did not qualify
1930	56–57	2nd	Bob Rice	Lost League Finals

== Notable alumni ==
- Ed Boland (1930)
- Jim Bucher (1930)
- Lefty Clarke (1920–1923)
- Adam Comorosky (1925)
- Joe Fitzgerald (1922–1925)
- Walt Herrell (1920-1921, 1924)
- Nat Hickey (1923)
- Al Hollingsowrth (1928)
- Johnny Keane (1930) Manager 1964 World Series champion - St. Louis Cardinals
- Wally Kimmick (1920–1921)
- Ray Knode (1922)
- Karl Kolseth (1920)
- Walt Lerian (1921)
- Billy Myers (1928–1929) Cincinnati Reds Hall of Fame
- Dick Niehaus (1922)
- Red Nonnenkamp (1930)
- John Perrin (1926), (1927, MGR)
- Johnny Posewitz (1930)
- Bob Rice (1930, MGR)
- Mike Ryba (1929)
- Burton Shipley (1921) Namesake of Shipley Field
- Dick Siebert (1929) MLB All–Star
- Steve Slayton (1929)
- Al Smith (1930) MLB All–Star
- Bill Trotter (1929-1930)
- Tommy Vereker (1922–1924)
- Jack Warner (1921)

== See also ==
Waynesboro Red Birds players
Waynesboro Villagers players
