= River Hill, Columbia, Maryland =

Coordinates: 39°12′35″N 76°55′8″W

River Hill
- Village
- Interactive map of River Hill
- Country: United States
- State: Maryland
- City: Clarksville
- Established: 1990
- Named for: River Hill Farm

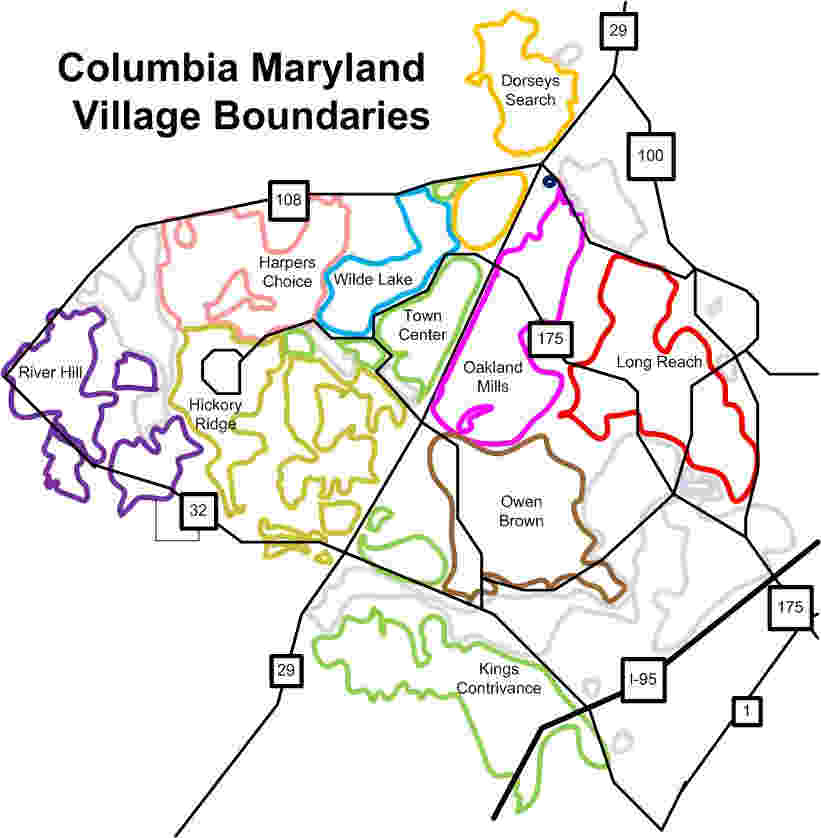
Villages of Columbia

River Hill is the last and westernmost village to be developed in the town of Columbia, Maryland, United States, though some residents maintain addresses in Clarksville. The village is home to 6,520 residents in 2,096 housing units in 2014. The area was used as a game preserve by James Rouse to entertain clients and personal hunting during the buildout of the Columbia project. In 1976, County Executive Edward L. Cochran selected the 784-acre parcel owned by Howard Research and Development for an alternate location for a county landfill; a task force selected Alpha Ridge Landfill instead. Residential construction started in 1990. It is bounded by Maryland Route 108 and Maryland Route 32, and is centered on Trotter Road. The village is divided into two neighborhoods: Pheasant Ridge and Pointers Run, with about 6,500 residents.

The original plan called for the village to be connected to the rest of Columbia via an extension of Little Patuxent Parkway. In addition, a dam on the Middle Patuxent River would have created a large lake in that watershed. However, with the rise of the environmental movement, a large part of the watershed was made into a park, with approximately half of its acreage devoted to open space, which includes the 900 acres (3.6 km^{2}) of the Middle Patuxent Environmental Area. In 1998, the county initiated managed deer hunting in River Hill, becoming the first time hunting was permitted in the Columbia development since the land purchases of 1963–1966. River Hill is largely disconnected from the rest of the city, accessing Columbia Town Center only by roads on the periphery of the city.

The original plan called for 90 acres (360,000 m^{2}) to be devoted to apartments, but the rural neighbors wanted a lower population density. The county zoning board decided upon 33 acres (130,000 m^{2}) for apartments. Consequently, River Hill has the most open space of all the villages.

== Etymology ==
River Hill is named for River Hill Farm, claimed to be one of the first plantations in Maryland to free its slaves, and demolished by the Rouse Company to build Pointer's Run. River Hill consists of the communities of Pheasant Ridge and Pointer's Run. Pheasant Ridge is named after Henry Howard's (1772–1773) 195-acre slave plantation land tract patented on November 16, 1745, later inherited by John Beal Howard.

The street names are derived from the works of Walt Whitman and James Whitcomb Riley.

== Education ==
The Howard County Public School System is a shared public school system serving the village:

- Elementary Schools
  - Clarksville Elementary School
  - Pointers Run Elementary School
- Middle Schools
  - Clarksville Middle School
- High School
  - River Hill High School
  - Atholton High School

== Notable people ==
- Ken Ulman, Howard County Executive.

== See also ==
- River Hill Farm
- John Due House
