= River Hill =

River Hill may refer to:

- River Hill, California
- River Hill, Columbia, Maryland
  - River Hill High School, in Maryland
- River Hill, Kent (215 m), a hill in Kent, England

== See also ==
- River Hills (disambiguation)
