= River Hill Farm =

River Hill House
- Location within Maryland
- 39°11′40″N 76°54′57″W
- Nearest city: Clarksville, Maryland

History
- Built: 18th century

River Hill Farm is a historic slave plantation located in Clarksville in Howard County, Maryland, United States. River Hill Farm resided on a land tract patented as "Four Brothers Portion". The house was built in the 18th century out of field stone with stucco covering. Outbuilding included a slave quarters. The 500 acre property was the home of Major Henry Owings of Owingsville.

In 1972, Rouse used the River Hill farm as a game preserve while other sections were being developed. Howard Research and Development placed the Game Manager lived in the historic house. In 1974 The property was proposed for use as a landfill, but Alpha Ridge Landfill was selected. The house was not preserved or submitted for the historic registry by the Rouse Company. It was demolished for the development of Pheasants Ridge.

== See also ==
- Clifton (Clarksville, Maryland)
- John Due House
