= Martinsburg Blue Sox =

- 1915–1929; (1915–1918, 1920–1929); Martinsburg, West Virginia

Minor league affiliations
- Previous classes: Class D
- League: Blue Ridge League

Major league affiliations
- Previous teams: Philadelphia Athletics (1929)

Minor league titles
- League titles: 1922–1924 (3)

Team data
- Previous names: Martinsburg Blue Sox (1922–1929); Martinsburg Mountaineers (1918, 1920–1921); Martinsburg Blue Sox (1916–1917); Martinsburg Champs (1915)
- Previous parks: Rosemont Park

The Martinsburg Blue Sox were an American minor league baseball team based in Martinsburg, West Virginia. They played in the Blue Ridge League between 1915 and 1929 and were an affiliate of the Philadelphia Athletics in 1929.

== History ==
A semiprofessional league, the Tri-City League, had teams in Hagerstown, Frederick and Martinsburg in 1914. In 1915, the Tri-City League organizers added the cities of Chambersburg, Hanover and Gettysburg and petitioned the National Association of Professional Baseball Leagues, the governing body of Minor League Baseball, for permission to establish a class D (lowest level) professional league, the Blue Ridge League.

=== 1915-1917: The Early Years ===
The Martinsburg franchise took the name Champs in 1915 because they had won the Tri-City League championship in 1914. They were owned by Max von Schlegel. Player eligibility was an issue not only for Martinsburg but for the entire Blue Ridge League as well. One such example for the 1915 team was Mike Knode. Knode played during the 1915 season as Kenny Thompson. Knode was a quarterback for the Michigan Wolverines football team. If knowledge of his participation in the professional Blue Ridge baseball league had been known to the Wolverines, he would have forfeited his amateur status and been declared ineligible to play football. Despite a late push in the last two weeks of the season, the team finished second in the standings.

Martinsburg adopted the nickname Blue Sox for 1916. The season was marked by an intense rivalry with the eventual champion Chambersburg Maroons. The rivalry between the two clubs became very heated in August, especially after the two teams had tied three games, including one in Martinsburg, and the Chambersburg directors refused to play in West Virginia city. League President Jamison sternly informed the Chambersburg club that they had to play one of the games in Martinsburg, or lose their 400 collar forfeit money put up by each club at the beginning of the season. The Maroons complied. The Mountaineers were led by pitching sensation Marv Goodwin, who led the league with 19 wins and 165 strikeouts, while Frank Colley accounted for 17 victories. Alan "Lefty" Clarke added 14 wins and 126 strikeouts. Martinsburg's Big Three accounted for 50 of their 56 victories. George "Reggie" Rawlings was the top fielding outfielder in the league, as well of one of the better hitters. The infield of Short Long, Johnny Bates, Katsey Dean, and Lu Blue also helped contribute to the pennant drive. Despite finishing the season with more wins that another Blue Ridge League team, Martinsburg had to settle for second for the second straight season, losing on percentage points (.570 for Chambersburg versus .560 for Martinsburg).

The Hagerstown Terriers finished with a 61–36 record to earn their first league championship in 1917. The Martinsburg club finished second (59-40 for the third year in a row. Once again player eligibility was a concern. The Martinsburg club protested Hagerstown's league championship, accusing the Terriers of using an ineligible player. After review from Blue Ridge League President James Vincent Jamison, Jr., the allegations were ruled unsubstantiated, and Hagerstown came away with the 1917 league pennant.

=== 1918-1919: The War and Pandemic Take Their Toll ===
The Martinsburg club was on shaky ground financially when the season started in 1918. The war created a losing proposition with a lack of attendance and increased travel costs. On June 15, less than three weeks into the season, Martinsburg called a meeting of the four member clubs in the West Virginia town. The Piedmont team, not realizing the urgency of the meeting, sent a proxy with League President Jamison, and Cumberland was not aware of the details of the meeting. Since Hagerstown President J. C. Roulette was confined to his bed with a serious illness, his vice-president, T. B. South, represented the Terriers. Martinsburg officials took advantage of this situation, and convinced South to agree with them to suspend the remainder of the season, due to the war effort. With Cumberland and Piedmont against disbanding, the final vote rested with President Jamison, who eventually agreed with Martinsburg, that it would be in everyone's best interest to suspend operations. The aftermath of the war and influenza pandemic would carry over into the next year, with no 1919 season for the Blue Ridge League or the Martinsburg club.

=== 1920-1921: Future Hall of Famers ===
The Blue Ride League and Martinsburg resumed play in 1920. Although Martinsburg did not finish as well in the standings compared to earlier years, 1920 and 1921 marked the debut of two future Hall of Fame players, Lefty Grove and Hack Wilson.

Player/Manager Bill Louden, a former infielder with the New York Giants, and a native of nearby Piedmont, West Virginia, WV, recruited players for his Martinsburg club from the area near his hometown and the surrounding Western Maryland area near Cumberland. There he came across a 19-year old southpaw hurler from Lonaconing, Maryland named Robert Moses Groves, later known as Lefty Grove. By June, word had gotten out that Grove, along with another 19-year old southpaw, Cecil Slaughter, were two of the best pitchers the league ever seen. On June 16 and 17, 1920, Jack Dunn, Jr., and scout Harry Frank of the International League Baltimore Orioles attended two games in Hagerstown to take a look at the two promising pitchers. Despite losing 4–2, primarily because the Martinsburg catcher could not handle Groves 90-plus mile an hour pitches, Groves made a major impression on the two Orioles scouts. Within 10 days, Groves was pitching for Jack Dunn, Sr.’s Orioles. Martinsburg, in need of a new outfield fence and grandstand, sold Groves' contract to Dunn’s Orioles for 3,000 dollars and later included a pitcher named Maurice Bahr to complete the deal.

1921 was just as auspicious because it marked the debut of another Hall of Fame member, Lewis "Hack" Wilson. He played for Martinsburg in the 1922 season as well. Wilson later set the major league season record of 191 runs batted in and was inducted into the Hall of Fame in 1979.

=== 1922-1924: Championship Years ===
Martinsburg won three straight championships from 1922 to 1924. George "Reggie" Rawlings was the dominant player during this time. During each of these three years, he led the league in batting average and hits. He was ably assisted during the 1922 season by future Hall of Famer "Hack" Wilson, who set an all-time league record of 30 home runs in a season. Interestingly enough, Rawlings, who married a Martinsburg girl during the off-season, started the season with the Waynesboro club, but became homesick, and asked Villagers manager, "Country" Morris to be traded before the start of the season. Rawlings was traded to Martinsburg a few days before the season opened for an outfielder named Peddicord. Waynesboro later tried to nullify the trade, since Peddicord was soon released, but Baseball's National Board of Arbitration upheld League President J. V. Jamison, Jr.’s in his decision on this transaction.

At the end of the 1922 season, the Baltimore Sun hosted a “Little World Series”, pitting Martinsburg, the champion of the Class D Blue Ridge League, against the winner of the new Class D Eastern Shore League, the Parksley (VA) Spuds. On September 7, Martinsburg traveled to the Virginia Eastern Shore to play in a best-of-seven series to decide the state baseball champion. The Spuds were managed by John “Poke” Whalen, who was a catcher with the original Blue Ridge league champions, the 1915 Frederick Hustlers. Four Blue Sox players hit home runs in the first game to give Martinsburg an 8 to 3 win. Blue Sox ace Walter Seaman shutout the Spuds 3–0 in game two, thanks to a home run by Jim Brehany. Brehany's suicide squeeze bunt in the eleventh inning of game three gave Martinsburg a 2 to 1 victory. Martinsburg swept the series in four games with a 4-0 whitewashing on September 11, behind the arm of Kirk Heatwole. The game featured a triple play in the third inning. Parksley's William Klinghoffer lifted a soft fly ball to Blue Sox right fielder Harry Jacoby, who threw out the runner trying to score from third, and catcher Mike Mullaney relayed the ball to second baseman Dave Black, who tagged out the runner trying to tag up from first base.

In 1923, Martinsburg won the league title by 15 games over the second place Waynesboro Villagers. This was the widest margin of victory in the league's history. This was followed in 1924 by closest margin of victory in league history. Martinsburg, managed by Bill Curtis, finished the season with 59 wins and 38 losses, good for a .608 winning percentage. The Blue Sox closest rival, the Hagerstown Hubs, managed by former league player, James Kieffer “Bugs” Snyder, won 60 games, but lost 39 contests, finishing with a .606 win percentage. Hagerstown had led the league standings for most of the season, before Martinsburg caught them the final days of the season.

=== 1925-1929: The Final Years ===
Martinsburg would never win another league championship. Martinsburg maintained a potent offense in 1925, with five of the top ten home run hitters in the Blue Ridge League playing for the team. However, they could do no better than third place.

1926 brought changes to the Blue Ridge League. The three Pennsylvania teams in the league (Waynesboro, Chambersburg and Hanover) began to experience financial difficulties. In order to generate more revenue and interest, the league adopted a split season schedule. The first half winner would play the second half winner in a playoff for the championship.

The split season would benefit the team in 1927 as Martinsburg won the second half of the season that year, while finishing second overall. Martinsburg played the first half winner and first place overall team Chambersburg, in a three-game series. Chambersburg prevailed two wins to none.

In 1928, the financial situation for the league became critical. In order to stay solvent, major league teams began to assume control of Blue Ridge League teams. In 1928, the Cleveland Indians took control of the Frederick club, while the St. Louis Cardinals took over management of the Waynesboro club. The Martinsburg club in 1928 finished with a losing record for the only third time in their history.

In 1929, the Martinsburg club was taken over by the Philadelphia Athletics, while the New York Yankees began to run the Chambersburg franchise. This was beneficial for Martinsburg as they captured the first half title and the best record overall. The team had the two winningest pitchers in the league with Malicky and Harry Griffith winning 18 games each. Also, Doc Cramer had a batting average of .404. In the championship playoff, Martinsburg lost to Hagerstown four games to two games.

1929 was the last year for the Martinsburg franchise. As the Great Depression set in, the Philadelphia Athletics pulled their sponsorship of Martinsburg. As a result, Martinsburg folded and did not field a team in 1930, the last year of the Blue Ridge League.

== Notable players ==
Martinsburg players from this era who were major leaguers:

- Lefty Clarke: 1915, 1916, 1917, 1926
- Larry Douglas: 1915
- Mike Knode: 1915
- Lu Blue: 1916, 1917
- Marv Goodwin: 1916
- Walter Beall: 1918
- Tom Crooke: 1918
- Joe Munson: 1918
- Lefty Grove: 1920
- Baldy Louden: 1920
- Johnny Neun: 1920, 1921
- Walt Herrell: 1921
- Hank Hulvey: 1921, 1922, 1923
- Hack Wilson: 1921, 1922
- Mule Shirley: 1922
- Fred Lucas: 1923
- Earle Mack: 1923
- Doc Ozmer: 1923, 1924
- George Quellich: 1923
- Lefty Willis: 1923, 1924
- Ed Sherling: 1924
- Denny Sothern: 1924, 1925
- Joe Cascarella: 1925
- Ike Powers:1925
- Charlie Bates: 1926
- Mickey Keliher: 1926
- Rusty Yarnall: 1926
- George Stutz: 1927
- Doc Cramer: 1929
- Rudy Miller: 1929

In addition to these future major leaguers, the performance of George "Reggie" Rawlings was also noteworthy. He played 13 seasons in the Class D Blue Ridge League, longer than any other player. He was considered by many league newspapers as the league's best player in Martinsburg's 1922, 1923, and 1924 championship seasons. He led the league in home runs three times, and held the third and fourth highest single season home run totals accomplished in the league (26 in 1922, and 25 in 1923). Rawlings also holds the distinction of being the only player in the league in score over 100 runs in one season, when he crossed the plate 104 times during the 1923 season. When Martinsburg affiliated with the Philadelphia Athletics prior to the 1929 season, Rawlings was released. He played for the neighboring independent Hagerstown (MD) Hubs, leading the Hubs to the 1929 league pennant, finishing his minor league career at the age of 38. He and his wife are buried at Rosemont cemetery, not far from where he played.

== Martinsburg Blue Ridge League season leaders ==
Martinsburg Blue Ridge League Season Leaders
| Year | Name | Category | Number |
|---|---|---|---|
| 1916 | Rawlings, Reggie; Blue, Lu | Games Played | 102 |
| 1916 | Goodwin, Marv | Games pitched | 36 |
| 1916 | Goodwin, Marv | Games started | 31 |
| 1916 | Goodwin, Marv | Complete Games | 31 |
| 1916 | Goodwin, Marv | Wins | 19 |
| 1916 | Goodwin, Marv | Shutouts | 10 |
| 1916 | Goodwin, Marv | Innings Pitched | 275 |
| 1917 | Bates, Johnny | Home Runs | 15 |
| 1917 | Blue, Lu | Doubles | 35 |
| 1917 | Blue, Lu(tied with one other) | Triples | 6 |
| 1917 | Blue, Lu | Total Bases | 184 |
| 1917 | Blue, Lu | Slugging Percentage | .517 |
| 1917 | Blue, Lu (with one other) | Stolen Bases | 30 |
| 1917 | Rawlings, Reggie | At bats | 390 |
| 1917 | Rawlings, Reggie | Runs batted in | 75 |
| 1917 | Clarke, Lefty | Bases on balls allowed | 89 |
| 1917 | Clarke, Lefty | Lowest Batting Average Against | .197 |
| 1918 | Beall | Bases on balls allowed | 28 |
| 1920 | Roberts, Ross | Innings pitched | 231 |
| 1921 | Lloyd, Frank | Runs | 92 (partially with Waynesboro) |
| 1921 | Satterlee, Bill | Doubles | 31 |
| 1921 | McGuire, Tommy | At Bats | 420 |
| 1922 | Rawlings, Reggie | Batting | .371 |
| 1922 | Rawlings, Reggie | At Bats | .394 |
| 1922 | Rawlings, Reggie | Runs | 82 |
| 1922 | Rawlings, Reggie | Hits | 146 |
| 1922 | Rawlings, Reggie | Total Bases | 251 |
| 1922 | Rawlings, Reggie | Singles | 97 |
| 1922 | Rawlings, Reggie | Runs batted in | 108 |
| 1922 | Rawlings, Reggie | Consecutive Hitting Streak | 108 |
| 1922 | Wilson, Hack | Slugging Percentage | .717 |
| 1922 | Roberts, Ross | Wins | 15 |
| 1922 | Seaman, Walter | Winning Percentage | .750 (9-3), tied with one other |
| 1922 | Brehaney, Jim | Sacrifice Hits | 34 |
| 1923 | Rawlings, Reggie | Hits | 145 |
| 1923 | Rawlings, Reggie | Home Runs | 25 |
| 1923 | Rawlings, Reggie | Doubles | 28 (tied with one other) |
| 1923 | Hulvey, Hank | Wins | 16 |
| 1924 | Rawlings, Reggie | Batting | .379 |
| 1924 | Rawlings, Reggie | Doubles | 31 |
| 1924 | Rawlings, Reggie | Home runs | 21 |
| 1924 | Rawlings, Reggie | Hits | 152 |
| 1926 | Rawlings, Reggie | Home Runs | 19 |
| 1928 | Millik | Hits | 125 |
| 1929 | Cramer, Doc | Batting | .404 |
| 1929 | Malicky; Harry Griffin | Wins | 18 |

== Team season-by-season records ==
Martinsburg Season by Season Records
| Season | Nickname | Record | Finish | Games Behind | Manager(s) | Postseason |
|---|---|---|---|---|---|---|
| 1915 | Champs | 44-30 | 2nd | 8 | William "Country" Morris | None |
| 1916 | Mountaineers | 56-44-2 | 2nd | 0.5 | William "Country" Morris | None |
| 1917 | Mountaineers | 59-40 | 2nd | 3 | William "Country" Morris | None |
| 1918 | Mountaineers | 6-10 | 4th | 4 | William "Country" Morris | None |
| 1920 | Mountaineers | 49-48 | 4th | 7.5 | Bill Louden | None |
| 1921 | Mountaineers | 44-49 | 4th | 12.5 | Joe Ward; George "Reggie" Rawlings | None |
| 1922 | Blue Sox | 58-41-1 | 1st | - | Dave Black; H. Burton Shipley | League Champions; Defeated Parksley VA Spuds 4–0 in Little World Series |
| 1923 | Blue Sox | 67-30 | 1st | - | Earle Mack | None (League Champions) |
| 1924 | Blue Sox | 59-38 | 1st | – | Peter Curtis | None (League Champions) |
| 1925 | Blue Sox | 50-47 | 3rd | 13.5 | Pat Ragan; Brownie Burke | None |
| 1926 | Blue Sox | 47-46 | 3rd | 16.0 | Dave Black | Did not qualify |
| 1927 | Blue Sox | 57-43 | 2nd | 8.5 | Brownie Burke | Lost to Chambersburg 2–0 in Blue Ridge League Championship |
| 1928 | Blue Sox | 27-22 (1st Half); 16-30 (2nd Half) | 2nd (1st Half); 6th (2nd Half) | 9 (1st Half); 9.5 (2nd Half) | Jesse Runser; Jiggs Donahue | Did not qualify |
| 1929 | Blue Sox | 31-26 (1st Half); 38-31 (2nd Half) | 3rd (1st Half); 1st (2nd Half) | 4.5 (1st Half): (2nd Half) | Dan O'Leary | Lost to Hagerstown 4–2 in Blue Ridge League championship |

== Legacy ==
The team name Blue Sox continues to be used by amateur teams representing Martinsburg. Interestingly, a 2021 amateur team called the Blue Sox played in an amateur Blue Ridge League, part of the National Amateur Baseball Federation. This incarnation of the Blue Sox has been in existence since 2010.
