= Varun Ram =

American basketball player (born 1992)

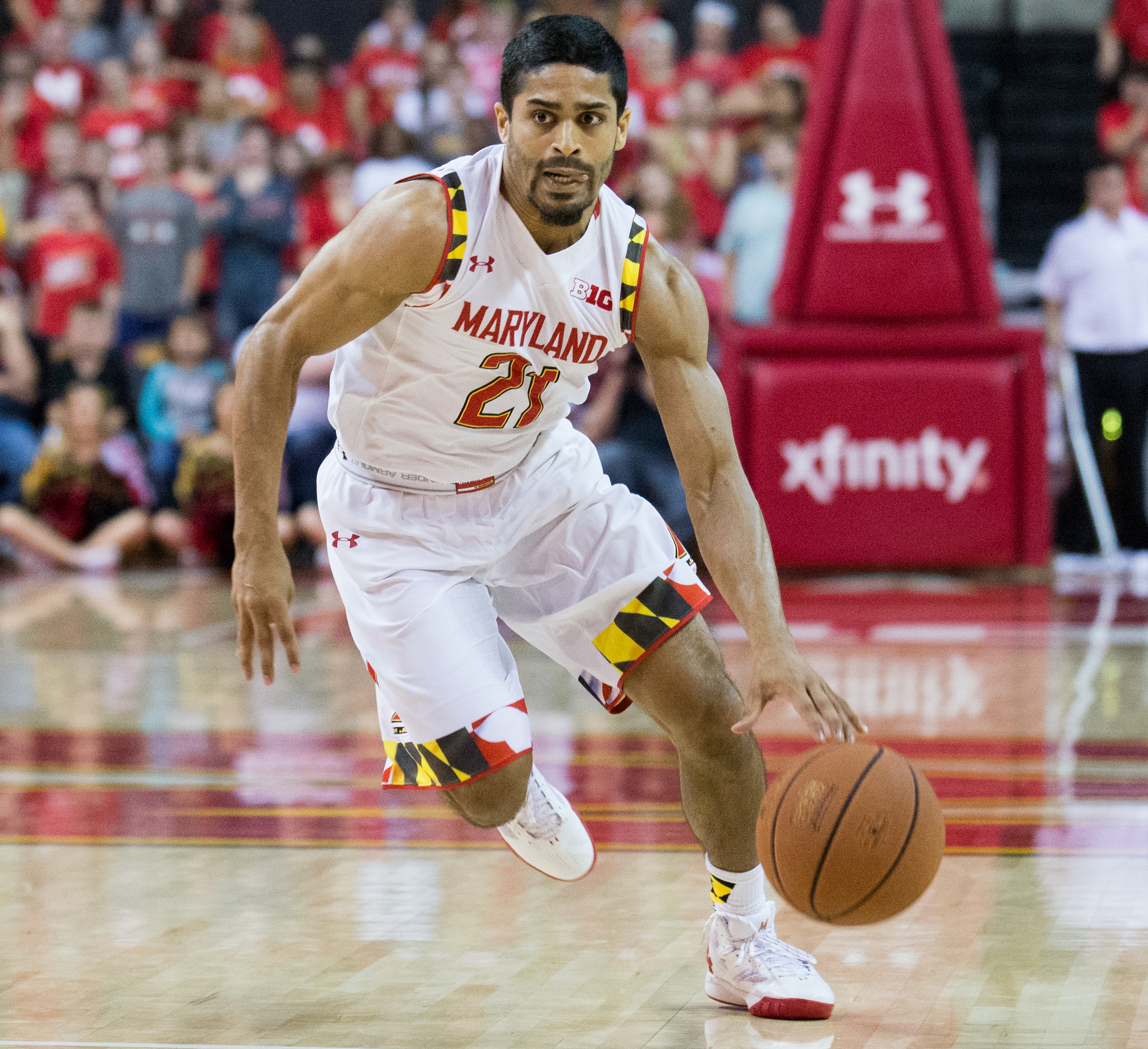

Personal information
- Born: December 16, 1992 (age 33)
- Listed height: 5 ft 9 in (1.75 m)
- Listed weight: 155 lb (70 kg)

Career information
- High school: River Hill (Clarksville, Maryland)
- College: Trinity (2011–2012); Maryland (2013–2016)
- NBA draft: 2016: undrafted
- Position: Guard

Varun Ram Ramasamy (born December 16, 1992) is an American basketball player who played for the Maryland Terrapins. He was one of the few players in the NCAA of Indian descent. Ram previously competed for Trinity College.

== Collegiate career ==
=== Senior ===
On March 20, 2015, in his first NCAA Division I men's basketball tournament appearance, Ram made a key play in the final seconds of a second-round game against Valparaiso. Crusaders guard Tevonn Walker made a free throw with one minute remaining in the second half, making the score 65–62 in Maryland's favor. Following a missed opportunity to close the game from Dez Wells, Valparaiso's Keith Carter attempted to take the final three-point shot and a potential game-tying field goal with a second left in regulation. However, Ram, who was primarily guarding him, smacked the ball away and began to run around the court very hyped up. He said after the game, "I've been envisioning this my whole life. And being able to actually do it, for it to happen, is amazing. I feel like it's a dream come true. A game of this magnitude, it's unbelievable." Terrapins head coach Mark Turgeon remarked that Ram was one of his top five funniest players. He did not accumulate any statistics throughout the contest, though, because Evan Smotrycz was given credit for the steal.

== Personal life ==
Ram is the son of Kolandavel and Santhini Ramasamy. He is of Indian Tamil origin. His sister, Anita, attended Johns Hopkins University for both her undergraduate degree as well as medical school. Varun has been considered the Maryland basketball team's smartest player, with a 3.99 grade-point average in neurology and physiology. He is well known for his grit, determination, and perseverance in both athletics and academics. After he graduating UMD, he wanted to work in Medical consulting. He was also thinking of playing basketball for an overseas professional team or the Indian National team (he was ineligible due to his citizenship status).

In addition, Ram is a volunteer coaching fellow with Crossover Basketball and Scholars Academy (www.crossover-India.org); an organization committed to impacting education rates in India (Chennai at this time) through the use of basketball as a vehicle of change and imparting the skills of leadership, character, teamwork, and communication.

He has been a part of the India Rising (now Brown Ballers), TBT roster summer tournament since 2022. Ram competed with his alma mater's TBT team, Shell Shock, in the summer of 2025.

Ram graduated from Stanford Graduate Business School in 2023. Teammate Melo Trimble said, "Varun, he's probably the smartest guy on the team."
