= Richland Farm (Clarksville, Maryland) =

Historic house in Maryland, United States

- U.S. National Register of Historic Places
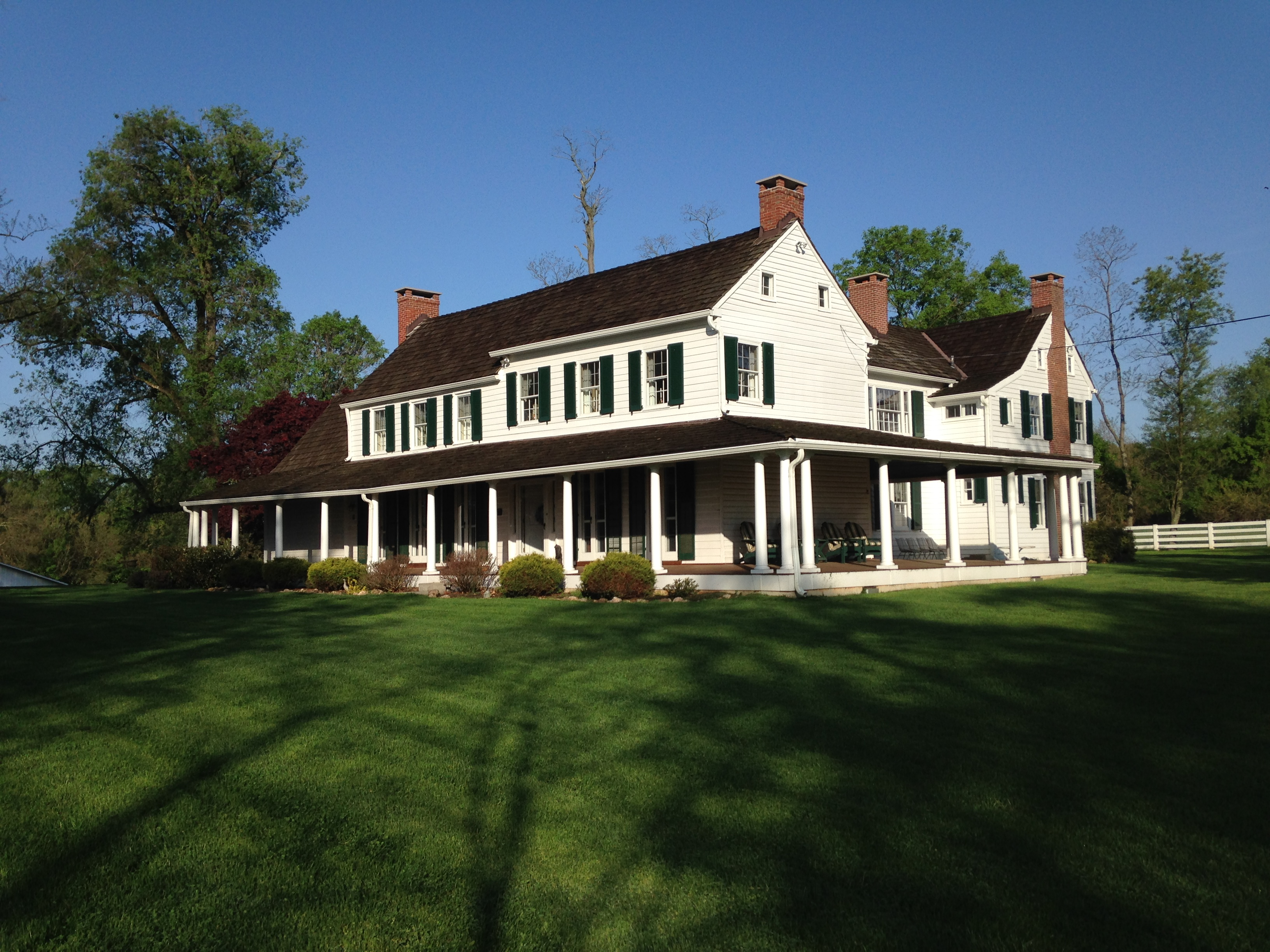
- Richland Farm, Main House, May 2014

- Location within Maryland Location within the United States
- Location: 4730 Sheppard Ln., Clarksville, Maryland
- Coordinates: 39°14′40″N 76°56′45″W
- Area: 132.75 acres (53.72 ha)
- Built: 1719
- Architect: Turnbull, Bayard (1919-20 changes)
- Architectural style: Colonial, Colonial Revival
- NRHP reference No.: 08000217
- Added to NRHP: March 26, 2008

Richland Farm is a historic home and farm complex located at Clarksville, Howard County, Maryland, United States. The main house is a log and frame house, the earliest section of which is presumed to date from 1719. The main block comprises three sections, with a large addition on the rear added in 1920. It features a one-story shed-roofed wrap-around porch supported by 22 Doric order columns. Also on the property are the Overseer's/Superintendent's House, Gardener's Cottage, wagon shed, tractor shed and smokehouse with board-and-batten siding, a bank barn, a stone spring house and “Barrack.”

== History ==
=== 1719-1800 ===
Richland was originally part of "Altogether," a land grant surveyed on May 10, 1719, by Thomas Worthington and his brother-in-law, Henry Ridgely. A small portion of Richland was also part of "Worthington's Range." Thomas Worthington left 300 acres of Altogether and 63 acres of Worthington's Range to his daughter, Ariana Worthington Watkins, who was married to Nicholas Watkins Jr. Thomas Worthington's will, dated January 9, 1752 and proved after his death in 1753, indicates that Ariana's inheritance was already part of a plantation established by her husband. Ariana divided her holdings among her three sons, John, Nicholas and Gassaway. Richland was part of Gassaway Watkins's inheritance. Gassaway Watkins returned to Richland to live after his service in the American Revolutionary War.

=== Early residents and expansion under the Watkins family 1801-1850 ===
The current boundaries of Richland were set in 1801. It shares its northeast border with the original boundary of Doughoregan Manor, patented to Charles Carroll the Settler on 7,000 acres and later expanded to 10,000 acres. Doughoregan Manor served as the summer home of his grandson, Charles Carroll of Carrollton, the last surviving signer of the Declaration of Independence and the only Catholic to do so.

Gassaway Watkins, born in 1752, was admitted as an original member of The Society of the Cincinnati in the state of Maryland when it was established in 1783. He later served as vice president (1831–1839) and president of the Maryland Society (1839–1840), serving in the latter capacity until his death. When he died in 1840, he was the last surviving original member of the Maryland Society, and reportedly of the Old Line. General George Washington reportedly referred to the Maryland Line as the "Old Line" due to the quality and length of their service during the Battle of Long Island. He was also one of the Maryland 400. Colonel Watkins served under General William Smallwood at Long Island and at the Battle of Cowpens, among other engagements. Colonel Watkins was married three times.

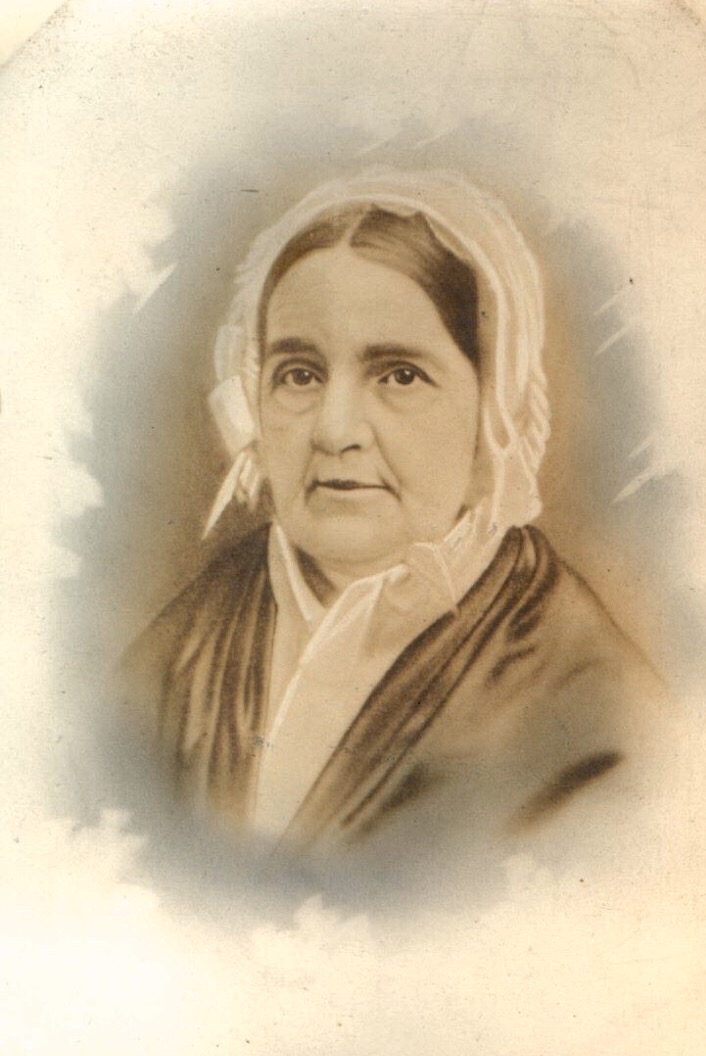
Elenora Bowie Clagett, Third Wife of Gassaway Watkins

Daughter Margaret Gassaway Watkins married Albert Gallatin Warfield. One of their sons and a grandson of Gassaway Watkins, Edwin Warfield, served as the 45th governor of Maryland from 1904 to 1908.

During his lifetime, Gassaway Watkins acquired nearby land, including Hayland Farm (now known as the Walnut Creek housing subdivision) and Walnut Grove (Clarksville, Maryland) (also now a housing subdivision), where he built a manor house that still survives and is listed on the Howard County properties of the Maryland Historical Trust. Gassaway Watkins, Elenora Bowie Clagett Watkins, John Sebastian Watkins and several other family members are buried at Walnut Grove. Howard County historian Ken Short undertook an exhaustive analysis of the history of Walnut Grove.

A son of Gassaway Watkins and Elenora Bowie Clagett Watkins, Dr. William Washington Watkins and his wife, Laura Louise Watkins Watkins, ultimately owned Richland Farm. Mrs. Watkins was the daughter of Thomas Jones Watkins (1773–1860), a Baltimore merchant, and Elizabeth Spurrier Watkins (1779–1851). Dr. and Mrs. Watkins were married in Baltimore on May 30, 1837. In 1846, they added a section to the main house at Richland that includes a first floor parlor and second floor bedroom. They had several children.

According to his obituary in the Baltimore Sun on June 2, 1880, Dr. Watkins received an appointment to West Point but preferred instead to pursue the medical profession. He attended the University of Maryland and received his medical degree from the Medical College of Philadelphia. In addition to his service as a medical doctor, Dr. Watkins was elected as a representative of the Howard District of Anne Arundel County in the Maryland legislature. In 1838, Dr. Watkins proposed the "Howard District" of Anne Arundel County, which became Howard County, Maryland in 1851. He was elected as the first state senator from Howard County thereafter. Beginning in 1845, Dr. Watkins also served as a judge of the Orphan's Court in the Howard District of Anne Arundel County. He ran for the U.S. Congress but was defeated by Thomas Fielder Bowie.

Laura Watkins's brother, Thomas Jr., married Dr. Watkins's sister, Amanda, on February 16, 1835. Thomas died of pneumonia at Richland on January 10, 1874.

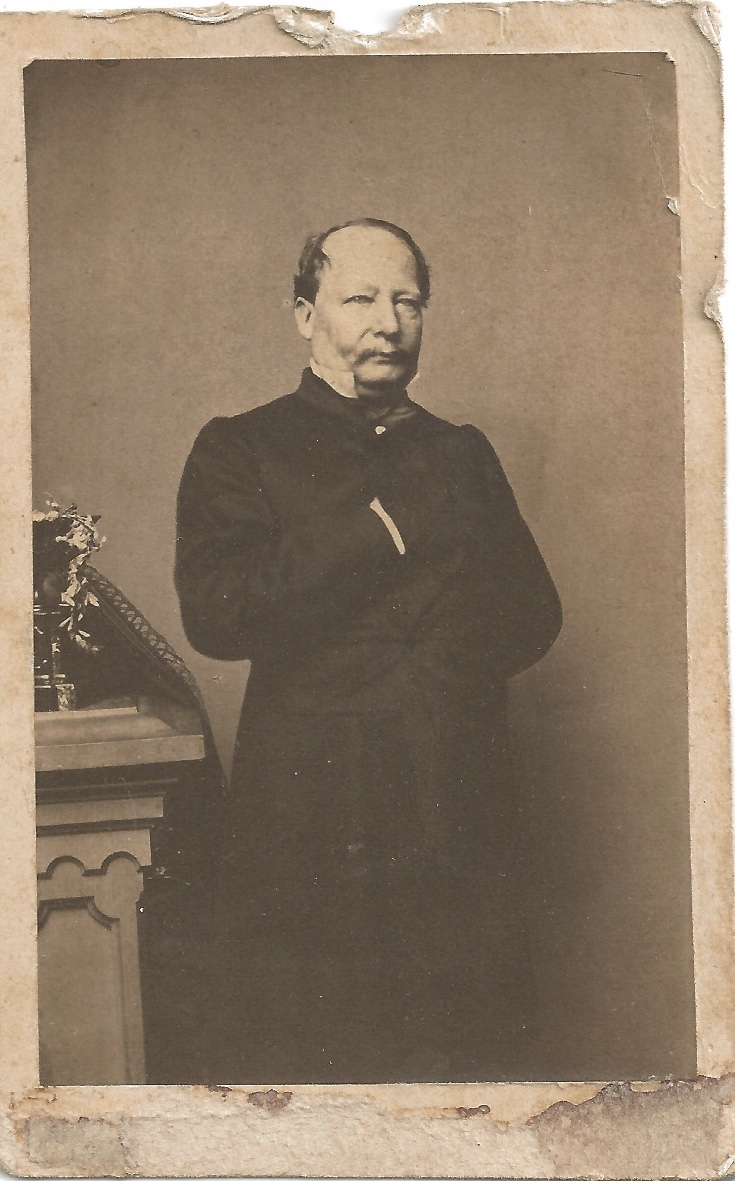
Thomas Watkins Jr.

Laura Louise Watkins died in 1850, and Dr. Watkins subsequently married Margaret Eleanor Harwood. They had two children: Joseph Harwood Watkins (1853–1887) and Sophia Watkins (1855–1870).

Dr. Watkins retired to Richland in 1873, where he died on May 31, 1880. An obituary at the time of his death that appears in the Watkins family Bible (newspaper unknown) describes Dr. Watkins: "But in his retirement at Richland the people of his county fully realized was still of them and among them. His house continued the abode of the most liberal and unostentatious hospitality, where gathered a large circle of relatives and friends. To all was extended the warm and hearty welcome that bespoke the man." Another obituary observed: "Dr. Watkins was possessed of rare social qualities, and had the pleasant manners of the 'old school.' His hospitality was boundless, and his home was the favorite resort of the gentlemen of influence and standing throughout the county. Socially, he was sought and enjoyed not only by the old, but the young as well."

=== Slavery at Richland Farm ===
There was a long history of slavery at this site. The last slave owner at Richland, Dr. Watkins, was discussed extensively in the manuscript of Oliver Cromwell Gilbert, which is in the family papers of his great-great-granddaughter, Stephanie Gilbert. Oliver, a house slave at Walnut Grove, was the son of Cynthia Snowden, the enslaved cook at Walnut Grove, and Joseph Kelly, a free black man from Owingsville, Maryland. His grandmother, Rachel, who was the mother of Cynthia Snowden, "had charge of Richland," where many of Gassaway Watkins's slaves lived. (Indeed, Gassaway Watkins's will refers to Richland as the "Quarters Place".) Oliver's manuscript indicates that Rachel died at Richland. When Gassaway Watkins died, Oliver was first placed with Margaret Watkins Warfield, one of Gassaway's daughters, and then with Dr. Watkins, where he was a house slave. Dr. Watkins's daughter, Eleanor Elizabeth, asked him to accompany her to a nearby Methodist camp meeting in August 1848. He sought and obtained permission to stay at the meeting despite the hesitations of Dr. Watkins. During a break for the white attendees at about 6 pm, the blacks in attendance were told that they could take the seats formerly occupied by their white enslavers. When the white attendees returned for the evening service, Oliver, then about 16 years old, escaped with fourteen other enslaved men. Dr. Watkins and William Clark, his brother-in-law and then owner of Hayland Farm next to Richland, ran an advertisement for the return of Oliver and two others in the Baltimore Sun on August 22, 1848. After Oliver's escape, he changed his name to Oliver Cromwell Gilbert. His manuscript, in turn, was the basis for a lengthy piece in the summer 2011 edition of the Maryland Historical Magazine by Jody R. Fernald, "In Slavery and Freedom: Oliver C. Gilbert and Edwin Warfield, Sr." Separately, his life and escape are retold in "Oliver Cromwell Gilbert: A Life," published in 2014 by Jody Fernald and Stephanie Gilbert, Oliver's great-great-granddaughter, as part of the University of New Hampshire Scholar's Repository, Paper 75.

=== The Dorseys ===
Joshua Worthington Dorsey, whose wife was Eleanor Watkins Dorsey, a daughter of Dr. Watkins who grew up at Richland, next owned Richland Farm.

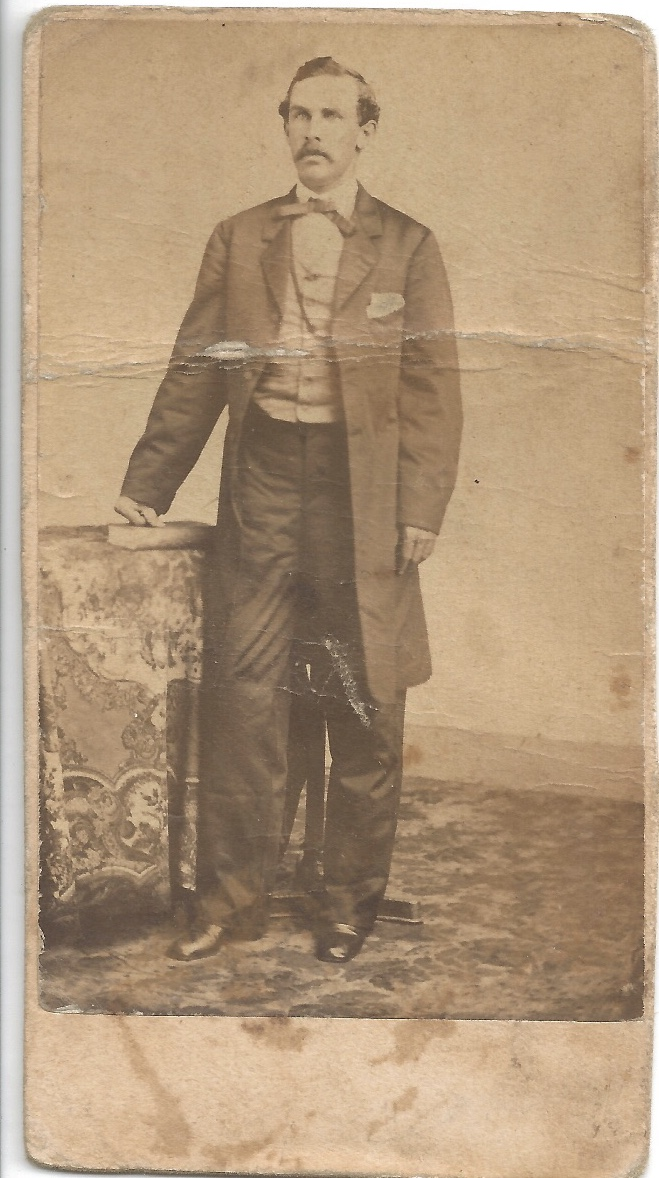
Joshua Worthington Dorsey

He was the son of Rinaldo Warfield Dorsey (1812–1850) and Achsah Ann Worthington (1814–1839). A confederate soldier in the Civil War, he owned numerous tracts of Howard County farmland and also owned a large farm supply and hardware business in Ellicott City, Maryland. A directory from the Ellicott City Times describes Mr. Dorsey as a "Dealer in Coal and Fertilizers of all kinds; Horses and Vehicles of all kinds to hire, and Horses taken at Livery." He was one of the organizers and a director of the Patapsco National Bank and was a member of St. Peter's Protestant Episcopal Church in Ellicott City. He added many improvements at Richland, including the bank barn; corn crib; a barrack barn; an addition to the Overseer's House for the tenant farmer; and a cistern in the attic of the original log section of the main house that collected rain water for use in the house.

=== 1900- present ===
Joshua and Eleanor Watkins Dorsey had numerous children: Margaret Warfield Dorsey (1864–1921); William Watkins Dorsey (1865–66); Joshua Worthington Dorsey, Junior (1866–1923); Laura Watkins Dorsey (1868–72); William Rinaldo Dorsey (1869–1935); Sophia Harwood Dorsey (1871–73); Samuel Henry Dorsey (1872–73); John Malcolm Dorsey (1873–1919); Eleanor "Nell" Bowie Dorsey (1875–1954); Benjamin Henry Dorsey (1877–1962); and Achsah Maria Dorsey (1879–1961). After Eleanor Watkins Dorsey died in 1893, Joshua Worthington Dorsey married Katherine "Kate" Cooke Worthington (1855–1934) in 1898.

When Joshua Worthington Dorsey died in 1918, one of his daughters, Achsah Maria Dorsey Serpell, and a son, Joshua Worthington Dorsey Jr., bought out the interests of their siblings in Richland. They hired prominent Baltimore architect Bayard Turnbull (1879–1954) to renovate and expand the main house over the period from 1919 to 1920.

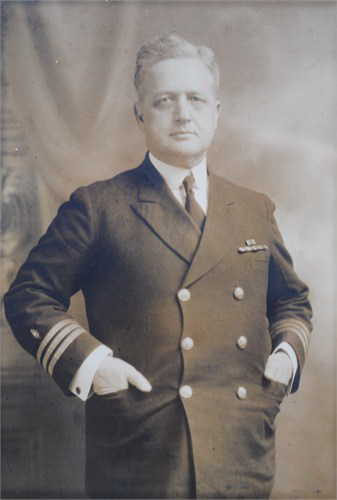
Rear Admiral Benjamin H. Dorsey

Thereafter, Richland served as the venue for many summer family gatherings and parties for the Washington, D.C., "navy crowd" hosted by Achsah Dorsey Serpell's brother, Rear Adm. Benjamin Henry Dorsey and his wife, Theda Fulton Dorsey (1887–1983). A July 16, 1939 article from the Washington Times Herald describes Richland as the scene of a party for several hundred guests consisting of "ranking high officers of the Navy and many from the younger circles in Washington society . . . ". According to the article, "several hundred guests were received on the rich green lawn, where tables were laid for tea, and indoors a section of the Navy Band Orchestra played for dancing." An article in the Washington Post lauded Admiral and Mrs. Dorsey's daughter, Achsah Bowie Dorsey (1921–2001): "During the entire party the debutante was the chief center of attention . . . . [Miss Dorsey] had chosen a bouffant frock of white net that contrasted nicely with her dark hair and set off her creamy complexion."

In June 1953, Achsah Dorsey Serpell deeded Richland to Achsah Bowie Dorsey Smith, her niece, namesake and daughter of Admiral and Mrs. Dorsey. A 1939 cum laude graduate of the Holton-Arms School, she was a society reporter for the Washington Post and Washington Times Herald, in which she ran a daily column about the social scene in the nation's capital, "Ask Achsah."

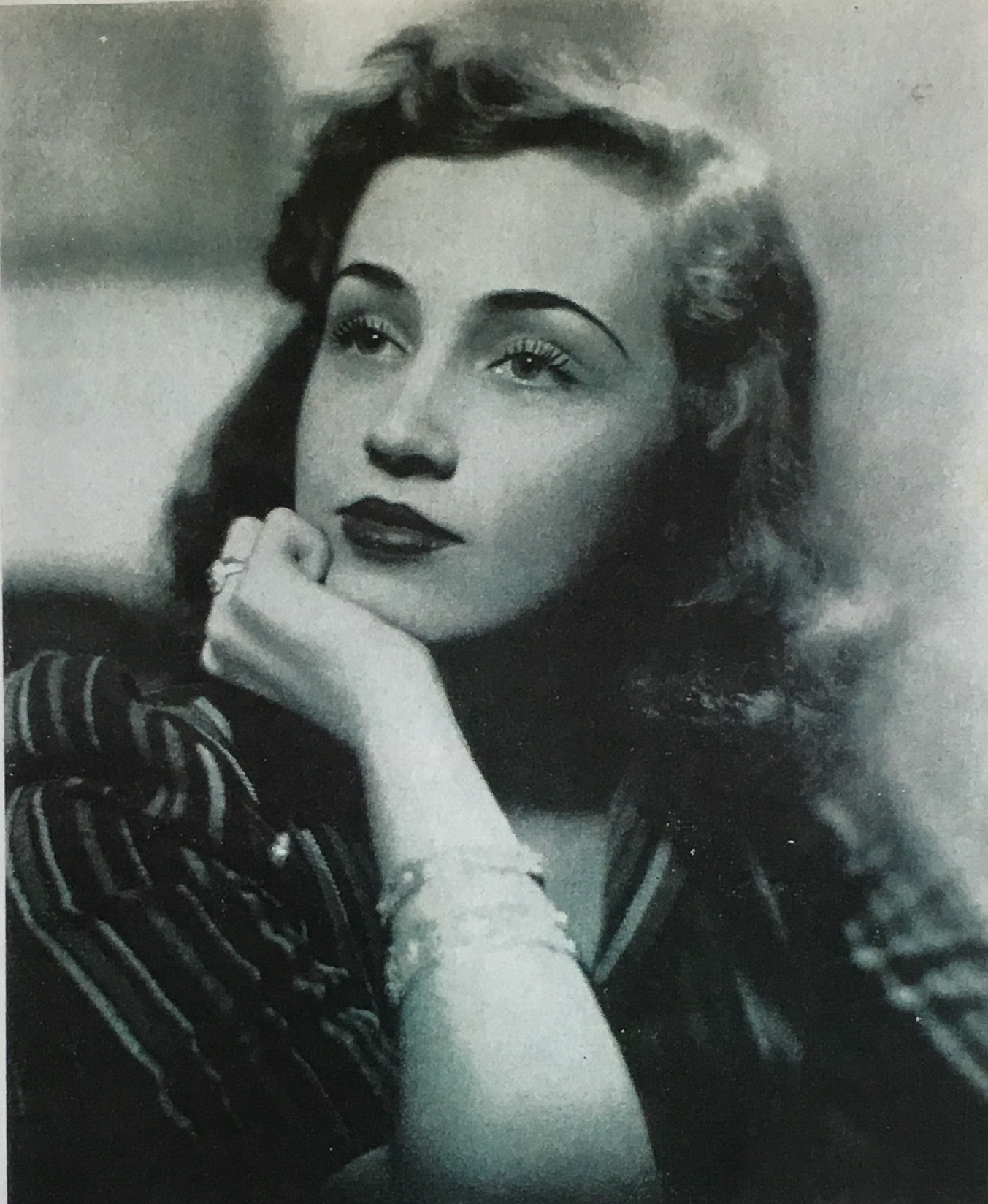
Achsah Bowie Dorsey, 1939

Richland Farm passed to Achsah Dorsey Smith's goddaughter and niece, a granddaughter of Admiral and Mrs. Dorsey, in 2005. She sold it in 2023.

Richland Farm was listed on the National Register of Historic Places in 2008.
