= Country Morris =

American baseball player and sports coach

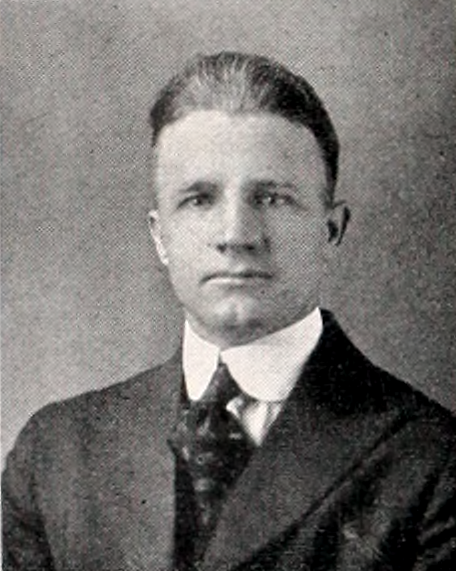
- Morris in 1920

Biographical details
- Born: 1890 or 1891; Rockingham County, Virginia, U.S.
- Died: July 10, 1976 (aged 85); Glen Falls, New York, U.S.
- Education: Maryland

Playing career
- 1911: Worcester Busters
- 1915–1918: Martinsburg Champs/Blue Sox/Mountaineers

Coaching career (HC unless noted)

Baseball
- 1915–1918: Martinsburg Champs/Blue Sox/Mountaineers
- 1917, 1920: Clemson
- 1920–1923, 1926: Waynesboro Red Birds/Villagers

Basketball
- 1916–1917, 1919–1920: Clemson

Football
- 1916–1917, 1919: Clemson (assistant)
- 1923–1957: The Albany Academy

Head coaching record
- Overall: 17–28 (college baseball); 16–8 (basketball)

William Gordon "Country" Morris was an American baseball player and baseball, basketball, and football coach. Morris was born in 1890 or 1891 in Rockingham County, Virginia. He lettered in four sports, including football (where he was captain of the 1913 team) and baseball, at Maryland Agricultural College. Morris played minor league baseball for the Worcester Busters of the New England League in 1911 and for the Martinsburg Champs/Blue Sox/Mountaineers of the Blue Ridge League as a player/coach from 1915 to 1918.

In 1916, he as hired as an assistant football coach at Clemson College, and he was also head basketball and baseball coach. He enlisted in the United States Navy in 1917, returning to Clemson in 1919 to coach one more season.

From 1920 to 1923, and in 1926, Morris returned to the Blue Ridge League to coach the Waynesboro Red Birds/Villagers. From 1923 until 1957, he coached football at The Albany Academy, where his son and Andy Rooney attended. Morris died on July 10, 1976, in Glen Falls, New York.

== Head coaching record ==
=== Baseball ===
Record table
Season	Team	Overall	Postseason
1917	Clemson	13–13	
1920	Clemson	4–15	
Total:		17–28 (.378)	
National champion Postseason invitational champion Conference regular season champion Conference regular season and conference tournament champion Division regular season champion Division regular season and conference tournament champion Conference tournament champion

=== Basketball ===
Record table
Season	Team	Overall	Postseason
1916–17	Clemson	8–2	
1919–20	Clemson	8–6	
Total:		16–8 (.667)	
National champion Postseason invitational champion Conference regular season champion Conference regular season and conference tournament champion Division regular season champion Division regular season and conference tournament champion Conference tournament champion
