= Hack Wilson =

American baseball player (1900–1948)

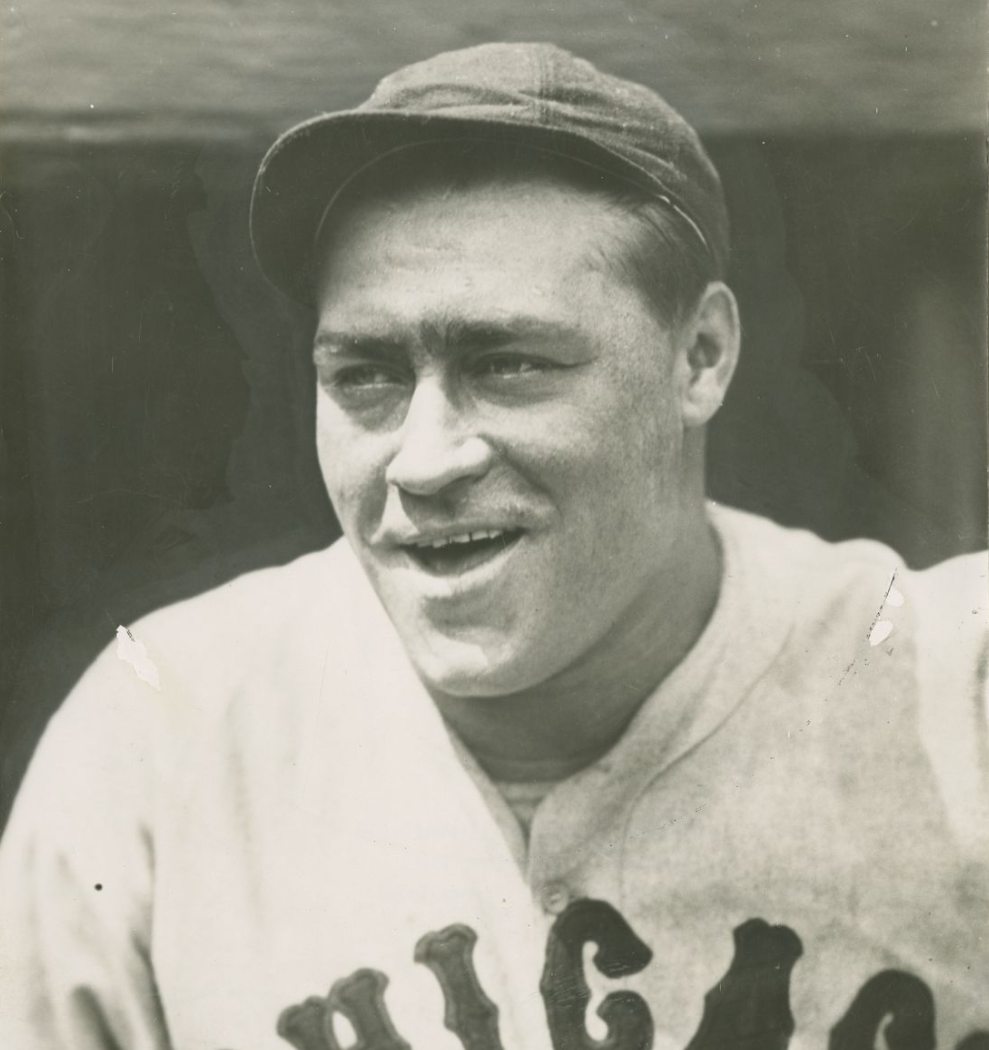
- Outfielder
- Born: April 26, 1900; Ellwood City, Pennsylvania, U.S.
- Died: November 23, 1948 (aged 48); Baltimore, Maryland, U.S.
- Batted: Right Threw: Right

MLB debut
- September 29, 1923, for the New York Giants

Last MLB appearance
- August 25, 1934, for the Philadelphia Phillies

MLB statistics
- Batting average: .307
- Home runs: 244
- Runs batted in: 1,063
- Stats at Baseball Reference

Teams
- New York Giants (1923–1925); Chicago Cubs (1926–1931); Brooklyn Dodgers (1932–1934); Philadelphia Phillies (1934)

Career highlights and awards
- 4× NL home run leader (1926–1928, 1930); 2× NL RBI leader (1929, 1930); MLB record 191 RBI, single season; Chicago Cubs Hall of Fame

Member of the National

Baseball Hall of Fame
- Induction: 1979
- Election method: Veterans Committee

Lewis Robert "Hack" Wilson (April 26, 1900 – November 23, 1948) was an American Major League Baseball player who played 12 seasons for the New York Giants, Chicago Cubs, Brooklyn Dodgers and Philadelphia Phillies. Despite his diminutive stature, he was one of the most accomplished power hitters in the game during the late 1920s and early 1930s. His 1930 season with the Cubs is widely considered one of the most memorable individual single-season hitting performances in baseball history. Highlights included 56 home runs, the National League record for 68 years, and 191 runs batted in, an MLB record yet to be approached; the closest any player has come to having that many RBIs came in the very next season, when Lou Gehrig had 185 for the New York Yankees. "For a brief span of a few years," wrote a sportswriter of the day, "this hammered down little strongman actually rivaled the mighty Ruth."

While Wilson's combativeness and excessive alcohol consumption made him one of the most colorful sports personalities of his era, his drinking and fighting undoubtedly contributed to a premature end to his athletic career and, ultimately, his premature death. He was inducted into the Baseball Hall of Fame in 1979.

== Baseball career ==
=== Early life and minor leagues ===
According to biographical information, Lewis Robert Wilson was born April 26, 1900, in the Pennsylvania steel mill town of Ellwood City, north of Pittsburgh. His mother, Jennie Kaughn, 16, was an unemployed drifter from Philadelphia.

According to civil records, his mother was "Jennie Kuhn", who married Hazen Caldwell in Ellwood City on 29 January 1900, apparently while pregnant. She gave birth to a son recorded as "Louis Caldwell" in Beaver County a few months later. By the time of the 1900 census, Hazen Caldwell was living with his father and siblings in Ellwood City on 8 June 1900, listed as still married. On 9 June 1900, 17-year-old Mrs. Jennie Caldwell (still married) and her son, Lewis (said to be born in April) were living with her father in North Sewickley Township, along with Robert Wilson (already married), a steel worker listed as a boarder. She was a heavy drinker, and in 1907 died of appendicitis at the age of 24. Her death certificate continued to list her under the name "Caldwell", so she evidently never married Robert.

In 1916, Wilson left school to take a job at a locomotive factory, swinging a sledge hammer for four dollars a week. Although only 5 ft 6 in (1.68 m) tall, he weighed 195 lb (88 kg) with an 18-inch neck, and feet that fit into size 5 1/2 shoes. Sportswriter Shirley Povich later observed that he was "built along the lines of a beer keg, and was not wholly unfamiliar with its contents." While his unusual physique was considered an oddity at the time, his large head, tiny feet, short legs, and broad, flat face are now recognized as hallmarks of fetal alcohol syndrome. In the 1920 census, he was living with Robert H Wilson in Leiperville, Ridley Township.

In 1921, Wilson moved to Martinsburg, West Virginia, to join the Martinsburg Mountaineers of the Class "D" Blue Ridge League. After breaking his leg while sliding into home plate during his first professional game, he was moved from the catcher's position to the outfield. In 1922, he met Virginia Riddleburger, a 34-year-old office clerk; they married the following year. In 1923, playing for the "B" division Portsmouth Truckers, he led the Virginia League in hitting with a .388 batting average. Late in the season, New York Giants manager John McGraw purchased his contract from Portsmouth for $10,500 (equivalent to $590,000 in 2025).

=== New York Giants ===
Wilson made his major league debut with the Giants on September 29, 1923, at the age of 23, and became the starting left fielder the following season. By mid-July he was ranked second in the National League (NL) in hitting. He ended the season with a .295 average, 10 home runs, and 57 runs batted in (RBIs) as New York won the NL pennant. In the 1924 World Series he averaged only .233 in a seven-game loss to the Washington Senators.

Multiple stories exist to explain the origin of Wilson's nickname. By one account, a New York newspaper held a nicknaming contest; the winning entry was "Hack" because he reminded many fans of another stocky athlete, the popular wrestler Georg Hackenschmidt. In another version, McGraw is said to have remarked that Wilson's physique was reminiscent of a "hack" (slang for taxicab in that era). Giants teammate Bill Cunningham claimed that the nickname was based on Wilson's resemblance to Hack Miller, an outfielder with the Chicago Cubs. The New York Times printed the first documented usage of "Hack" on June 10, 1924.

Early in the 1925 season, Wilson hit the longest home run on record at Ebbets Field against the Brooklyn Robins, but fell into a slump in May, and was replaced in left field by Irish Meusel. On July 2, Wilson hit two home runs in one inning, tying Ken Williams' major league record set in 1922, but his hitting slump continued. In August, McGraw told reporters that he had "... made the mistake of rushing [Wilson] along," and sent him to the Giants' minor league affiliate, the Toledo Mud Hens of the American Association. At season's end, a front office oversight — or possibly, deliberate inaction — left him unprotected on the Toledo roster, and the last-place Chicago Cubs acquired him on waivers. "They let go the best outfielder I ever played alongside," said Giants right fielder Ross Youngs, "and they're going to regret it."

During the 1925 World Series, Wilson's son, Robert, was born.

=== Glory years with the Cubs ===
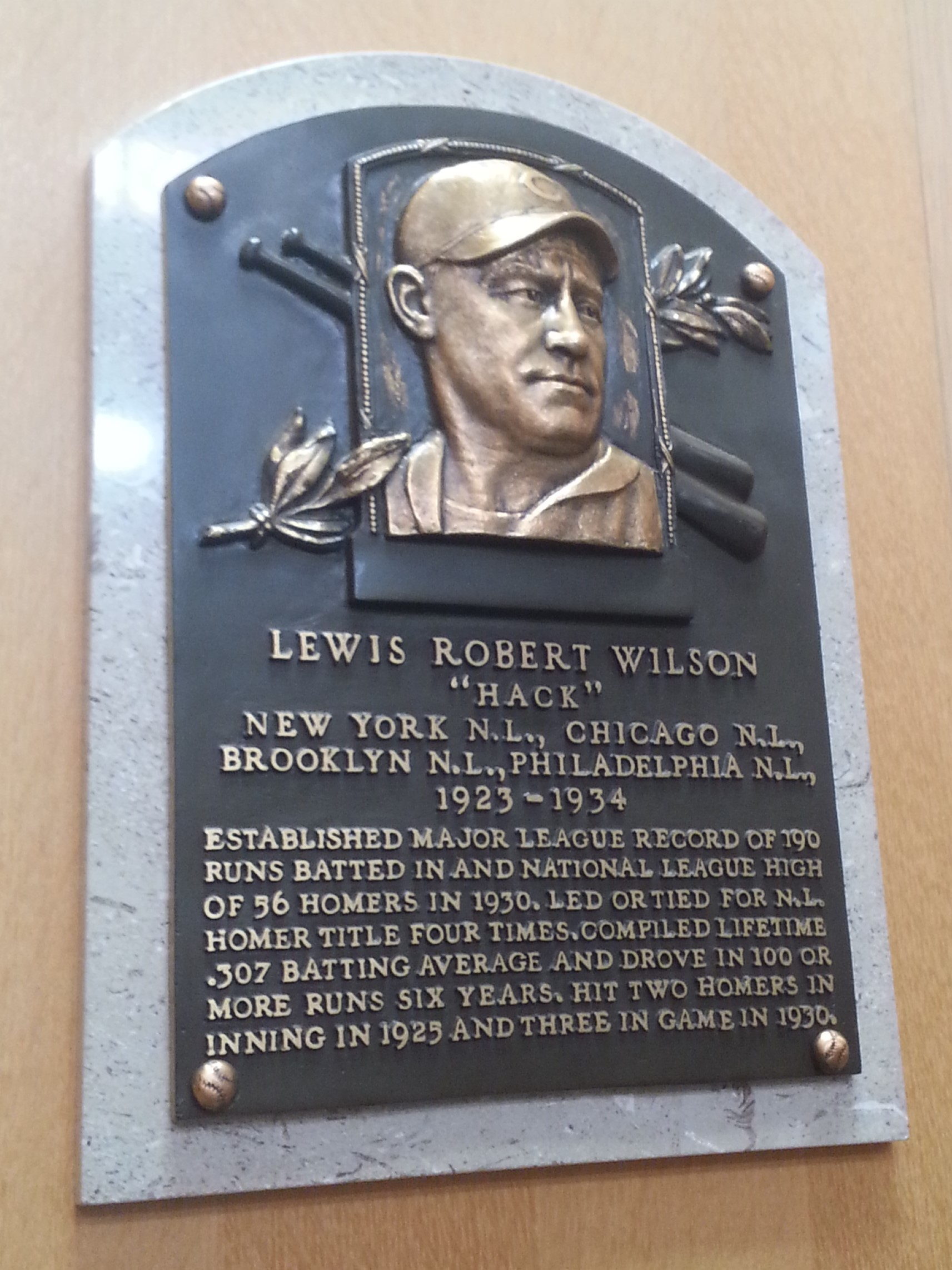
Plaque of Hack Wilson at the Baseball Hall of Fame

Wilson regained his form as the Cubs' center fielder in 1926, and he quickly became a favorite of Chicago fans. On May 24, he hit the center field scoreboard with one of the longest home runs in Wrigley Field history as the Cubs came from behind to defeat the Boston Braves (The 1926 center field scoreboard is not to be confused with the current scoreboard constructed in 1937, which is considerably further from home plate and has never been struck by a home run ball). Later that evening, he made news again when he was arrested during a police raid of a Prohibition-era speakeasy while trying to escape through the rear window and was fined $1 (equivalent to $18 in 2025). He ended the season with a league-leading 21 home runs along with 36 doubles, 109 RBIs, a .321 batting average, and a .406 on-base percentage. The Cubs improved to fourth place, and Wilson ended the year ranked fifth in voting for the NL's Most Valuable Player (MVP) Award.

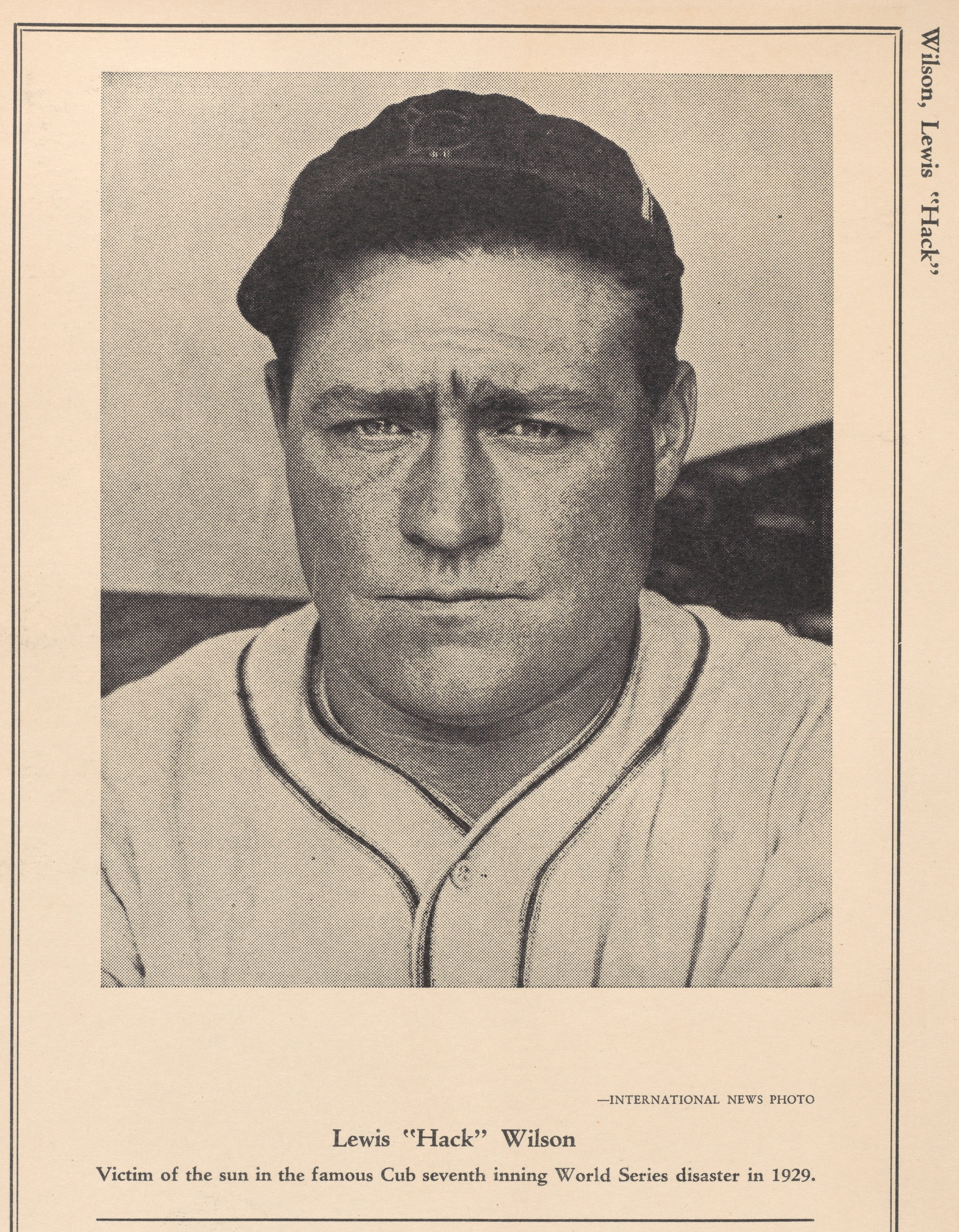
Wilson circa 1929

Another strong performance followed in 1927 as Wilson once again led the league in home runs. Although the Cubs were in first place heading into the final month of the season, the team faltered and again finished fourth. Wilson posted a .318 average with 30 home runs and 129 RBIs and led NL outfielders with 400 putouts. He led the NL in home runs for a third consecutive year in 1928 with 31, along with 120 RBIs and a .313 average as the Cubs improved to third place.

Wilson had a combative streak and sometimes initiated fights with opposing players and fans. On June 22, 1928, a near-riot broke out in the ninth inning at Wrigley Field against the St. Louis Cardinals when Wilson jumped into the box seats to attack a heckling fan. An estimated 5,000 spectators swarmed the field before police could separate the combatants and restore order. The fan sued Wilson for $20,000, but a jury ruled in Wilson's favor. The following year, Wilson took offense at a remark by Cincinnati Reds pitcher Ray Kolp, and — upon reaching first base after hitting a single — he charged into the Reds dugout, punching Kolp several times before they could be separated. Later that evening at the train station, Wilson exchanged words and blows with Cincinnati pitcher Pete Donohue. In late 1929, he signed a contract to fight Art Shires of the Chicago White Sox in a boxing match, but reneged after Cubs president William Veeck, Sr. enlisted Wilson's wife Virginia to dissuade him, and then Shires lost a fight to George Trafton of the Chicago Bears. There was nothing to gain, Wilson said, by fighting a defeated boxer.

Wilson's "penchant for festivities" is also well documented. Biographer Clifton Blue Parker described him as "... the Roaring '20s epitome of a baseball player, primed for an age of American excess ... at a time when baseball was America's favorite sport." His love of drinking and partying did not endear him to Cubs owner William Wrigley, who abhorred alcohol consumption. (Wilson always insisted that he never played drunk; "hung over, yes; drunk, no.") Manager Joe McCarthy worked hard to shield Wilson from Wrigley and to keep him on an even keel. "Better than any other manager," wrote sportswriter Frank Graham, "Joe understood Hack, made allowances for him when he failed, and rewarded him with praise when he did well. Joe could be strict and stern with his players ... but he never was with Hack, and Hack repaid him by playing as he never had before, nor would again."

In 1929, Wilson hit .345 with 39 home runs and a league-record 159 RBIs. He and new teammate Rogers Hornsby (who also contributed 39 home runs) led the Cubs to their first NL pennant in 11 years. In the World Series against Connie Mack's Philadelphia Athletics, Wilson's .471 hitting performance was eclipsed by two fielding errors at Shibe Park. Though trailing the Series two games to one, the Cubs were leading by a score of 8–0 in the fourth game when the Athletics mounted a 10-run rally in the seventh inning. Wilson lost two fly balls in the sun; the second, with two runners on base, led to an inside-the-park home run by Mule Haas as the Athletics won 10–8. After the game, McCarthy reportedly told a boy asking for a souvenir baseball, "Come back tomorrow and stand behind Wilson, and you'll be able to pick up all the balls you want!" The Athletics won again the next day to take the Series in five games.

==== 1930 peak ====
Wilson's 1930 season, aided by a lively ball wound with special Australian wool, is considered one of the best single-season hitting performances in baseball history. By the middle of July, he had accumulated 82 RBIs. In August, he hit 13 home runs and 53 RBIs, and by September 17 he had reached 174 RBIs, breaking Lou Gehrig's major league record established three years earlier. He finished the season with 190 RBIs, along with a then-NL-record 56 home runs, .356 batting average, .454 on-base percentage, and league-leading .723 slugging percentage. He was unofficially voted the NL's most "useful" player by the Baseball Writers' Association of America (which did not inaugurate its official MVP award until 1931).

In 1999, the Commissioner of Baseball officially increased Wilson's 1930 RBI total to 191 after a box score analysis by baseball historian Jerome Holtzman revealed that Charlie Grimm had been mistakenly credited with an RBI actually driven home by Wilson during the second game of a doubleheader on July 28. Wilson's 191 RBIs remains one of baseball's most enduring single-season records. Lou Gehrig (185 in 1931) and Hank Greenberg (184 in 1937) came close during the 1930s, but no one has challenged the record since; the highest total since 1938 was Manny Ramirez's 165 RBI in 1999.

Reds catcher Clyde Sukeforth asserted that Wilson should have been credited with an additional home run in 1930 as well. "He hit one in Cincinnati one day," he said, "way up in the seats, hit it so hard that it bounced right back onto the field. The umpire had a bad angle on it and ruled that it had hit the screen and bounced back. I was sitting in the Cincinnati bullpen, and of course, we weren't going to say anything. But Hack really hit 57 that year." Wilson's official total of 56 stood as the NL record until the 1998 season, when it was broken by Sammy Sosa (66) and Mark McGwire (70).

=== Decline ===
Wilson's success in the 1930 season served only to fuel his drinking habits, and in 1931 he reported to spring training 20 pounds overweight. In addition, the NL responded to the prodigious offensive statistics of the previous year (the only season, other than 1894, in which the league as a whole batted over .300) by introducing a heavier ball with raised stitching to allow pitchers to gain a better grip and throw sharper curveballs. Wilson complained that the new Cubs manager, Hornsby, did not allow him to "swing away" as much as Joe McCarthy had. He hit his 200th career home run — only the fourth player ever to do so, behind Ruth, Cy Williams, and Hornsby — at Ebbets Field on June 18, but then fell into a protracted slump, and was benched in late May. By late August, Wrigley publicly expressed his desire to trade Wilson. On September 6, he was suspended without pay for the remainder of the season after a fight with reporters aboard a train in Cincinnati. He was hitting .261 with only 13 home runs (his 1930 production during August alone) at the time.

In December 1931, the Cubs traded Wilson, along with Bud Teachout, to the St. Louis Cardinals for Burleigh Grimes. Less than a month later, the Cardinals sent him to the Brooklyn Dodgers for minor league outfielder Bob Parham and $25,000 (equivalent to $590,000 in 2025). Wilson hit .297 with 23 home runs and 123 RBIs for Brooklyn in 1932. He began 1933 with a ninth-inning game-winning pinch-hit inside-the-park grand slam home run at Ebbets Field—the first pinch-hit grand slam in Dodger history, and only the third inside-the-park pinch-hit grand slam in MLB history. By season's end, his offensive totals had dropped substantially, and he was hitting .262 when the Dodgers released him mid-season in 1934. The Philadelphia Phillies signed him immediately, but after just two hits in 20 at-bats, he was released again a month later. After a final season with the Albany Senators of the Class A New York–Pennsylvania League, Wilson retired at the age of 35.

== Career statistics ==
In a 12-year major league career, Wilson played in 1,348 games and accumulated 1,461 hits in 4,760 at-bats for a .307 career batting average and a .395 on-base percentage. He hit 244 home runs and batted in 1,063 runs, led the NL in home runs four times, and surpassed 100 RBIs six times. Defensively, he finished his career with a .965 fielding percentage. For players 5 ft 6 in (1.68 m) or shorter, he had the most home runs for any player in major league history (starting in 1927) until he was passed by Jose Altuve in 2025.

== Life after baseball ==
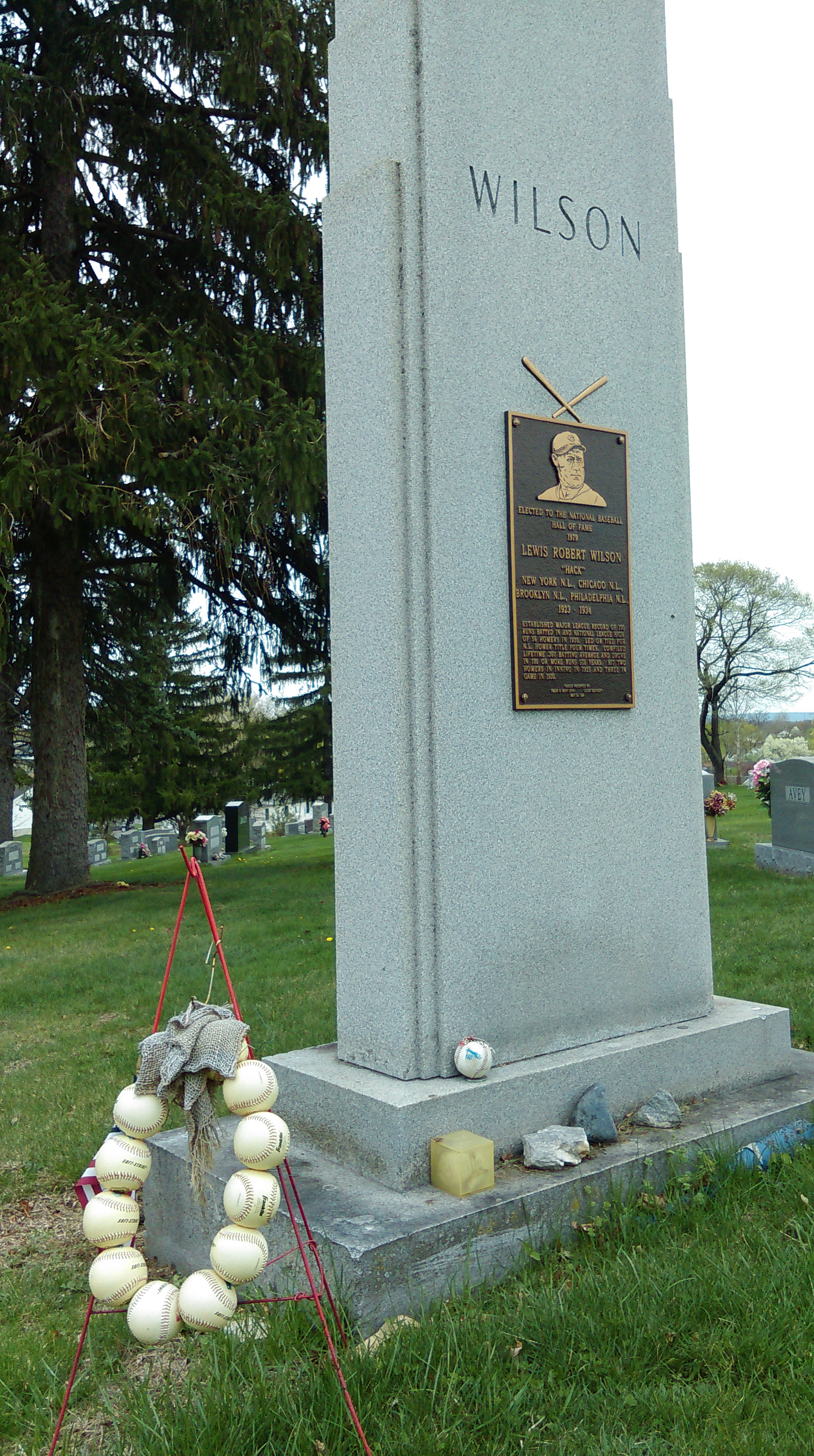
Hack Wilson's grave marker, located in Rosedale Cemetery in Martinsburg, West Virginia.

Wilson returned to Martinsburg where he opened a pool hall but encountered financial problems due to a failed sporting goods business venture and then a rancorous divorce from Virginia. By 1938, he was working as a bartender near Brooklyn's Ebbets Field, where he sang for drinks. He had to quit when customers became too abusive. A night club venture in suburban Chicago was another financial failure. In 1944, he took a job as a goodwill ambassador for a professional basketball team in Washington, D.C., where he lamented that fans remembered his two dropped fly balls in the 1929 World Series far more vividly than his 56 home runs and 191 RBIs in 1930. Unable to find work in professional baseball, he moved to Baltimore where he worked as a tool checker in an airplane manufacturing plant and later as a laborer for the City of Baltimore. When municipal authorities realized who he was, he was made the manager of a city swimming pool.

On October 4, 1948, Wilson was discovered unconscious after a fall in his home. Though the accident did not appear serious at first, pneumonia and other complications developed and he died of internal hemorrhaging on November 23, 1948, at the age of 48.

Wilson — once the highest-paid player in the National League — died penniless; his son, Robert, refused to claim his remains. NL President Ford Frick finally sent money to cover his funeral expenses. His gray burial suit was donated by the undertaker. In marked contrast to Babe Ruth's funeral, which had been attended by thousands just three months earlier, only a few hundred people were present for Wilson's services. He was buried in Rosedale Cemetery in the town where he made his professional playing debut, Martinsburg, West Virginia.

Ten months later, Joe McCarthy organized a second, more complete memorial service, attended by Kiki Cuyler, Charlie Grimm, Nick Altrock and other players from the Cubs and the Martinsburg team (by then renamed the Blue Sox). A granite tombstone was unveiled, with the inscription, "One of Baseball's Immortals, Lewis R. (Hack) Wilson, Rests Here."

One week before his death, Wilson gave an interview to CBS Radio which was reprinted in Chicago newspapers. In 1949, Charlie Grimm, the Cubs' new manager, posted a framed excerpt from that interview in the Cubs' clubhouse, where it remains. It reads, in part:

Talent isn't enough. You need common sense and good advice. If anyone tries to tell you different, tell them the story of Hack Wilson. ... There are kids in and out of baseball who think because they have talent they have the world by the tail. It isn't so. Kids, don't be too big to accept advice. Don't let what happened to me happen to you.

In 1979, Wilson was inducted into the Baseball Hall of Fame by the Veterans Committee. A Martinsburg street is named Hack Wilson Way in his honor, and the access road to a large city park within his hometown, Ellwood City, Pennsylvania, is known as Hack Wilson Drive.

== See also ==
- 50 home run club
- List of Major League Baseball annual home run leaders
- List of Major League Baseball annual runs batted in leaders
- List of Major League Baseball players to hit for the cycle
- List of Major League Baseball career runs batted in leaders
- List of Major League Baseball career slugging percentage leaders
- List of Major League Baseball career OPS leaders
- List of Major League Baseball career home run leaders

Preceded by Freddie Lindstrom	Hitting for the cycle June 23, 1930	Succeeded by Chick Hafey
