= River Hills =

River Hills may refer to:

- River Hills, Manitoba, Canada
- River Hills, Wisconsin, United States
- River Hills, South Carolina, United States
- Riverhills, Queensland, Australia

== See also ==
- River Hill (disambiguation)
