= Ray Kolp =

American baseball player (1894–1967)

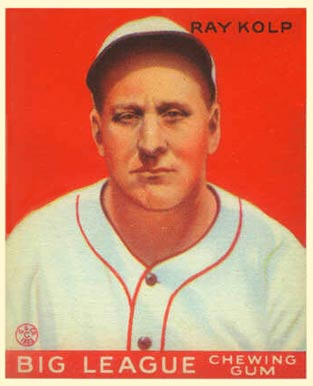
- Ray Kolp 1933 Goudey card
- Pitcher
- Born: October 1, 1894; New Berlin, Ohio, U.S.
- Died: July 29, 1967 (aged 72); Cincinnati, Ohio, U.S.
- Batted: Right Threw: Right

MLB debut
- April 16, 1921, for the St. Louis Browns

Last MLB appearance
- September 21, 1934, for the Cincinnati Reds

MLB statistics
- Win–loss record: 79–95
- Earned run average: 4.08
- Strikeouts: 439
- Stats at Baseball Reference

Teams
- St. Louis Browns (1921–1924); Cincinnati Reds (1927–1934)

Raymond Carl Kolp (October 1, 1894 – July 29, 1967) was an American professional baseball pitcher. Kolp played 12 seasons in Major League Baseball between 1921 and 1934, playing in 1921 through 1924 for the St. Louis Browns and 1927 through 1934 for the Cincinnati Reds. After leaving the major leagues, Kolp continued to be involved within baseball in minor leagues and in management.

== Career ==
Kolp played baseball as a youth (with the nickname "Jack") on New Berlin town teams and on the Electric Suction Sweepers, a team sponsored by the sweeper manufacturer that became the Hoover Company in 1922. Playing as "Ray Culp" for unclear contract-related reasons, he was a pitcher and shortstop for the Akron Numatics in 1920 in the minor's International League with famous teammate Jim Thorpe. In March 1921, Kolp was invited to a St. Louis Browns' tryout camp for pitchers and made the team to start his major league career. Early on, he seemed to have a jinx over the Cleveland Indians, beating them repeatedly, including his first trip to a big league mound on April 16, 1921.

Over his career, Kolp was a good pitcher, but never a great pitcher. He had an average fastball and mixed it with a sidearm pitch and various spinners. The most games he won in a season was 14 with the Browns in 1922. His overall major league won–loss record was 79–95. Kolp gave up two home runs to Babe Ruth in one game in New York on August 5, 1923.

On the field, he was vociferous, often taunting opposing players, and advised umpires from both the pitching mound and the dugout. Kolp was an adept teaser. His baiting harassment techniques made him a famous bench jockey, even in those days of unruly emotional baseball.

Kolp is most remembered for an incident in 1929 involving future Hall-of-Famer Hack Wilson. The episode occurred in the day's second game; in an earlier game there had been a triple play, which may explain why feelings were running high. Hack Wilson was on first with Ray Kolp in the Cincinnati dugout shouting taunts and insults as usual. Having endured enough, Hack charged off the field into the opposing dugout where he punched Ray Kolp in the jaw. A near-riot ensued in the stands, with the police needed to finally restore order. That evening, the two teams met up again at the train station, where Hack Wilson punched Ray's teammate Pete Donnohue. League president Heydler personally investigated the particulars of the attacks, declaring Hack the culprit and fining him $100. These shenanigans produced headlines for days in sports sections across the U.S.

Kolp played four years with the St. Louis Browns, spent two years in the minors in Minnesota with the St. Paul Saints, and then returned to the majors with the Cincinnati Reds in 1927. His last game in the majors was with the Reds on September 21, 1934. Two years later he received an engraved silver lifetime pass from major league baseball in recognition of his 12 years of big league service. Following the majors, Kolp pitched in the minors for the Minneapolis Millers for two years and then became their first base coach. He was the manager of the Williamsport Grays in Pennsylvania for two seasons, 1944 and 1945, handling a mostly Cuban team playing as replacements for the GIs at war. He led the team in promoting War Bonds, raising pledges for $231,000 in 1944.

His only son, Richard C. Kolp pitched in the minors for the Paducah Indians in the Class D level Kitty League in 1939 and 1940.

Ray Kolp died in Cincinnati, Ohio, on July 29, 1967. Ray and his wife Bertha Willett Kolp of Coalport, Pennsylvania, are buried in St. Stephen Cemetery in Fort Thomas, Kentucky.
