= John Perrin (American sportsman) =

American baseball and football player (1898–1969)

Jack Perrin
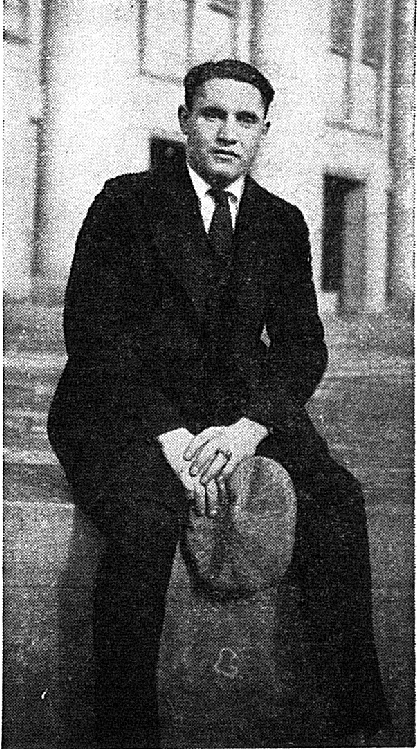
- Perrin at Michigan, 1920
- Outfielder (baseball), Back (football)
- Born: February 4, 1898; Escanaba, Michigan, U.S.
- Died: June 24, 1969 (aged 71); Detroit, Michigan, U.S.
- Batted: Left Threw: Right

MLB debut
- July 11, 1921, for the Boston Red Sox

Last MLB appearance
- July 12, 1921, for the Boston Red Sox

MLB statistics
- Games played: 4
- Batting average: .231
- Hits: 3
- Stats at Baseball Reference

Teams
- Boston Red Sox (MLB, 1921); Hartford Blues (NFL, 1926)

John Stephenson Perrin (February 4, 1898 – June 24, 1969) was an American baseball and football player. He played college baseball and football for the University of Michigan. He later played Major League Baseball (MLB) for the Boston Red Sox in 1921 and professional football for the Hartford Blues of the National Football League(NFL) in 1926.

== Early years ==
Perrin was born in Escanaba in Michigan's Upper Peninsula on February 4, 1898. He was the son of Levi Perrin and Margaret J. (Stephenson) Perrin. At the time of the 1900 United States Census, Perrin was living in Escanaba with his parents, four brothers, a sister, and a servant. At the time of the 1920 Census, Perrin was listed as living in Escanaba with his uncles, Fred and Andrew Stephenson and older brothers, Marshal and George Perrin.

== University of Michigan ==
After graduating from Escanaba High School in 1916, Perrin enrolled at the University of Michigan, where he played both football and baseball between 1918 and 1921. He played on Michigan's all-freshman football team in 1916 and was a reserve on the 1917 varsity team. As a junior, he was a starting halfback on Michigan's undefeated 1918 football team that has been recognized as the national champion. He served in the navy during the First World War and then returned for a final year of varsity football in 1920. Perrin won a total of four varsity letters, two each in football and baseball. While at Michigan, he was also a member of the Phi Gamma Delta fraternity and Michigamua.

== Professional baseball ==
In July 1921, Perrin joined the Boston Red Sox. He appeared in only four games for the Red Sox, all during mid-July 1921. He served as a backup for regular right fielder Shano Collins. He had three hits in 13 at-bats, scored three runs, and had one RBI. On July 26, 1921, the Red Sox released Perrin to Waterbury of the Eastern League.

After being released by the Red Sox, Perrin appeared in 71 games for the Waterbury Brasscos during the 1921 season. In 274 at-bats, he hit .299 with a .409 slugging percentage, 112 total bases, 10 doubles, and 10 triples. In the spring of 1922, Perrin remained bound to the Red Sox for spring training at Hot Springs, Arkansas.

After a three-year absence from professional baseball, Perrin played in 1925 for the Waco Cubs of the Texas League. He appeared in 85 games and compiled a .291 batting average with a .444 slugging percentage 154 total bases, 25 doubles, five triples and six home runs. During the 1926 season, Perrin split his time between the Waynesboro Villagers in the Blue Ridge League and the Pittsfield Hillies in the Eastern League. Between the two teams, Perrin appeared in 106 games in 1926 with a batting average of .312, a slugging percentage of .488, 202 total bases, 37 doubles, six home triples and eight home runs.

Perrin concluded his professional baseball career in 1927 playing for the Hagerstown Hubs in the Blue Ridge League. He hit .316 with a .475 slugging percentage, 155 total bases, 21 doubles, five triples and seven home runs.

== Professional football ==
In October 1926, Perrin joined the Hartford Blues of the National Football League. He appeared in six games for the Blues during the 1926 NFL season playing at the fullback and quarterback positions. He also served as a place-kicker for the Blues, kicking three extra points and one field goal.

Perrin also played for the Clifton Heights Orange & Black in 1927.

== Later years ==
Perrin died at the age of 71 in Detroit, Michigan. He was buried at Lakeview Cemetery in Escanaba.

== See also ==
- List of athletes who played in Major League Baseball and the National Football League
