= Marv Goodwin =

American baseball player (1891–1925)

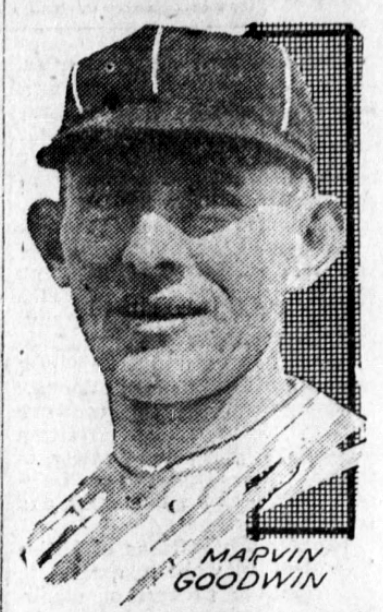
- Pitcher
- Born: January 16, 1891; Gordonsville, Virginia, U.S.
- Died: October 21, 1925 (aged 34); Houston, Texas, U.S.
- Batted: Right Threw: Right

MLB debut
- September 7, 1916, for the Washington Senators

Last MLB appearance
- October 4, 1925, for the Cincinnati Reds

MLB statistics
- Win–loss record: 21–25
- Earned run average: 3.30
- Strikeouts: 121
- Stats at Baseball Reference

Teams
- Washington Senators (1916); St. Louis Cardinals (1917, 1919–1922); Cincinnati Reds (1925)

Marvin Mardo Goodwin (January 16, 1891 – October 21, 1925) was an American professional baseball player who was a pitcher in Major League Baseball (MLB) for seven seasons between 1916 and 1925, playing for the Washington Senators, St. Louis Cardinals and Cincinnati Reds. Goodwin was known for throwing the spitball, and he was one of the 17 pitchers allowed to continue throwing the pitch after it was outlawed in 1920. Goodwin was a pilot in World War I. He died in 1925 from injuries sustained three days earlier when he had crash landed his airplane during a training flight while a member of the Army Air Service Reserve. He is believed to have been the first professional athlete killed as a result of a plane crash.

== Early life ==
Goodwin was born and raised in Gordonsville, Virginia, and graduated from high school there. He attended college for two years in New London, Connecticut, and later took a position as a telegraph operator with the Chesapeake and Ohio Railway. Goodwin became an established baseball star with the semipro team in his hometown, and the railroad agreed to give him time off when he was offered a contract by the Washington Senators in 1916.

== Baseball career before World War I ==
In 1916, Goodwin pitched for the Martinsburg Blue Sox of the Class D Blue Ridge League, starting and completing 31 games with a record of 19–12, with 10 shutouts. His major league debut came in September of that year, when he appeared three times in relief for Washington, pitching 5 2/3 innings and giving up two earned runs.

Goodwin started the 1917 season with the Milwaukee Brewers of the American Association, and compiled a record of 8–9 with a 1.91 earned run average (ERA), before being acquired by the St. Louis Cardinals in July. With the Cardinals his record for the season was 6–4 with a 2.21 ERA.

== Military service during World War I ==
In December 1917, Goodwin joined the United States Army. Being unmarried and with no dependents, he told the Cardinals he was sure to be drafted, so he enlisted in order to join the aviation corps. He was stationed in Texas, where he successfully completed his training, and became an aviation instructor. He was preparing to deploy to France when the war ended in November 1918.

== Baseball career after World War I ==
After the war, Goodwin rejoined the St. Louis Cardinals. In 1919, his record was 11–9 with a 2.51 ERA; in 1920, his record was 3–8 with a 4.95 ERA. For 1921 and 1922, he split time between the Cardinals and their farm club, the Houston Buffaloes of the Texas League, and then spent all of the 1923 and 1924 seasons with Houston. In May 1924, Goodwin became player-manager of the Houston club, a role he continued through the next season. Late in the 1925 season, his contract was sold to the Cincinnati Reds; he appeared in four games for the Reds, compiling a 0–2 record with a 4.79 ERA. His final major-league appearance came on the final day of the season, when he pitched a complete game in the first half of a doubleheader, but lost, 4–2.

== Death ==
Marv Goodwin
- Burial place: Gordonsville, Virginia
- Military career
- Allegiance: United States
- Branch: United States Army Air Service
- Service years: 1917–1925
- Rank: First Lieutenant
- Unit: Army Air Service Reserve
- Conflicts: World War I

Two weeks after his final appearance with the Reds, Goodwin crash landed his airplane at Ellington Field on October 18, 1925. The accident occurred during a training exercise when he was performing reserve duty with the United States Army Air Service. Goodwin experienced a tailspin about 200 feet (61 m) in the air. He was hospitalized with serious injuries including two broken legs. His piloting skills were credited with saving him from immediate death. Goodwin died on October 21, 1925, from the injuries he sustained three days earlier.

== Legacy ==
As noted by The Sporting News, "Marvin was a gentleman and an athlete of whom baseball can be proud... Lieutenant Goodwin sacrificed his life in behalf of his country. No person can do more." Goodwin is buried in Maplewood Cemetery in his hometown of Gordonsville.

== See also ==
- List of baseball players who died during their careers
