= Walnut Grove (Clarksville, Maryland) =

- Location within Maryland
- 39°13′43″N 76°56′22″W
- Location: Clarksville, Maryland

History
- Built: 1780

Site notes
- Architectural style: Federal

Walnut Grove is a historic plantation home located in Clarksville, Howard County, Maryland.

The Walnut Grove plantation was built on land patented by Thomas Browne as Browne's Chance and Dorsey's Friendship. Revolutionary war patriot Col Gassaway Watkins built the stone manor house in 1780 with an onsite cemetery. The property was also owned by racetrack & farm owner John Gill and son Barry Gill

In 1979 the property was entered into a historic preservation easement, with the intent to develop after a 25-year review. In 2001, the owners of Walnut Grove proposed developing 202 acres of the site near Sheppard Lane to develop 101 housing units with Goodier Builders.

== See also ==
- List of Howard County properties in the Maryland Historical Trust
- Clifton (Clarksville, Maryland)
