= Beau Brade =

American football player (born 2002)

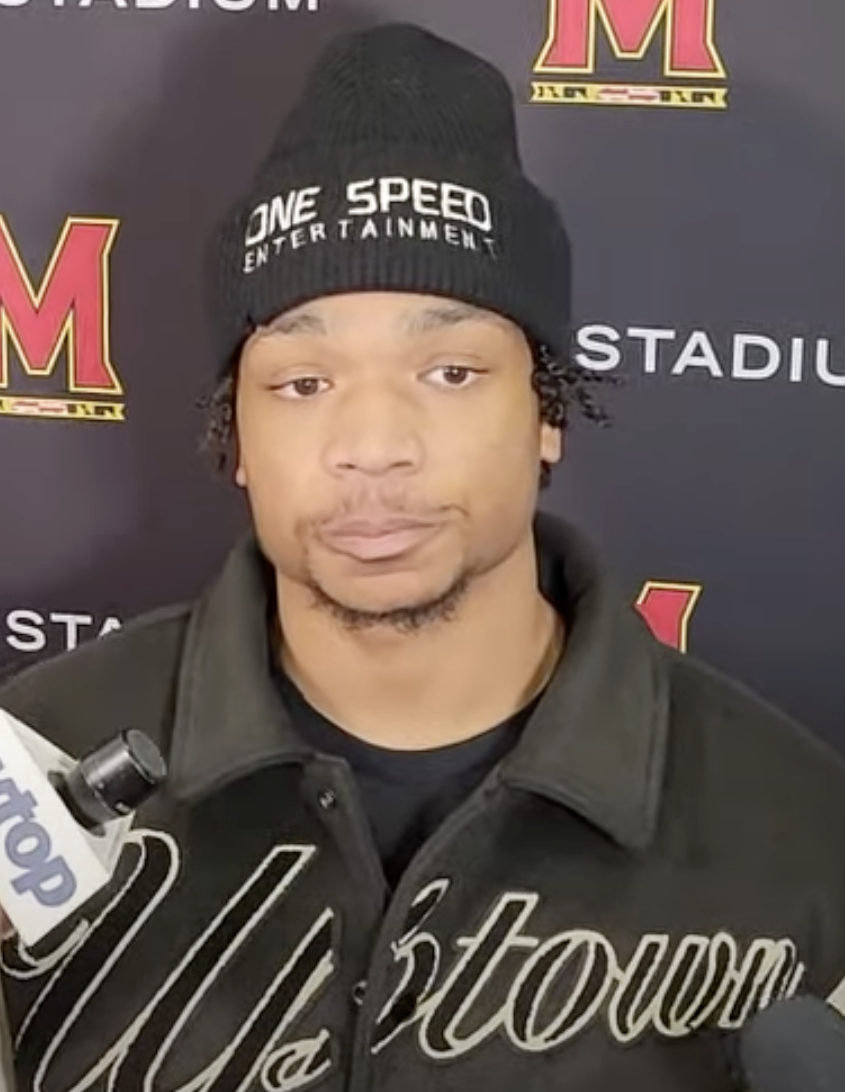
- Brade in 2023

No. 33 – Cincinnati Bengals
- Position: Safety
- Roster status: Practice squad

Personal information
- Born: January 29, 2002 (age 24); Clarksville, Maryland, U.S.
- Listed height: 6 ft 0 in (1.83 m)
- Listed weight: 209 lb (95 kg)

Career information
- High school: River Hill (Clarksville, Maryland)
- College: Maryland (2020–2023)
- NFL draft: 2024: undrafted

Career history
- Baltimore Ravens (2024); New York Giants (2025); Cincinnati Bengals (2026–present)*
- * Offseason or practice squad member only

Career NFL statistics as of 2025
- Tackles: 5
- Stats at Pro Football Reference

Beau Brade (born January 29, 2002) is an American professional football safety for the Cincinnati Bengals of the National Football League (NFL). He played college football at Maryland.

== Early life ==
Brade attended River Hill High School in Clarksville, Maryland. In his high school career, Brade finished with 450 career tackles, with 107 of them coming as a senior. He also recorded six interceptions, seven forced fumbles, and 13 tackles for loss. On offense, Brade tallied 1,377 total yards, and eleven total touchdowns. As a result, Brade was named the 2019 Howard County Times/Columbia Flier Defensive Player of the Year. A three-star recruit, Brade committed to play college football at the University of Maryland, College Park.

== College career ==
Brade played sparingly in a shortened 2020 season. The following year, he registered his first career sack, sacking Dustin Crum for a loss of ten yards. Brade finished the season with a total of 14 tackles. In 2022, in a game against SMU, Brade recorded a career-high 15 tackles, including his first career interception and forced fumble. Brade would also tally another interception, against Northwestern, increasing his season total to two interceptions. He led the team with 85 tackles, including four tackles for loss and five pass deflections. Following the 2023 season, Brade declared for the 2024 NFL draft, finishing his collegiate career with 177 tackles, 8.5 tackles for loss, and three interceptions.

== Professional career ==
Pre-draft measurables
Height	Weight	Arm length	Hand span	Wingspan	40-yard dash	10-yard split	20-yard split	20-yard shuttle	Three-cone drill	Vertical jump	Broad jump	Bench press
6 ft 0 in (1.83 m)	203 lb (92 kg)	31 in (0.79 m)	10 1/8 in (0.26 m)	6 ft 5 in (1.96 m)	4.68 s	1.58 s	2.69 s	4.31 s	6.89 s	32.5 in (0.83 m)	10 ft 0 in (3.05 m)	15 reps
All values from NFL Combine/Pro Day

=== Baltimore Ravens ===
Brade signed with the Baltimore Ravens as an undrafted free agent on May 3, 2024. He was also selected by the San Antonio Brahmas in the seventh round of the 2024 UFL draft on July 17. He made the Ravens roster as a rookie, playing in 11 games primarily on special teams.

Brade was waived on August 26, 2025 as part of final roster cuts.

=== New York Giants ===
On August 27, 2025, Brade was claimed off waivers by the New York Giants.

On January 17, 2026, Brade reunited with his former head coach John Harbaugh. On August 30, Brade was waived by the Giants as a part of final roster cuts.

=== Cincinnati Bengals ===
On September 29, 2026, Brade signed with the Cincinnati Bengals practice squad.
