= Bob Rice =

American baseball player (1899-1986)

- Third baseman
- Born: May 28, 1899; Philadelphia, Pennsylvania, U.S.
- Died: February 20, 1986 (aged 86); Elizabethtown, Pennsylvania, U.S.
- Batted: Right Threw: Right

MLB debut
- September 1, 1926, for the Philadelphia Phillies

Last MLB appearance
- September 29, 1926, for the Philadelphia Phillies

MLB statistics
- Batting average: .148
- Home runs: 0
- Runs batted in: 10
- Stats at Baseball Reference

Teams
- Philadelphia Phillies (1926)

Robert Turnbull Rice (May 28, 1899 – February 20, 1986) was an American third baseman in Major League Baseball. He played for one month with the Philadelphia Phillies in September, 1926.
