= Walt Herrell =

American baseball player

- Pitcher
- Born: February 19, 1889; Baltimore, Maryland, US
- Died: January 29, 1949 (aged 59); Front Royal, Virginia, US
- Threw: Right

MLB debut
- June 10, 1911, for the Washington Senators

Last MLB appearance
- June 10, 1911, for the Washington Senators

MLB statistics
- Pitching record: 0–0
- Earned run average: 18.00
- Strikeouts: 0
- Stats at Baseball Reference

Teams
- Washington Senators (1911)

Walter "Reds" William Herrell (February 19, 1889 – January 29, 1949) was an American professional baseball player who played in one game for the Washington Senators during the 1911 season.

Herrell began his career with the Johnson City Soldiers of the Appalachian League in 1911. He appeared in only one major league game in his career with against the Chicago White Sox in June of that year. He pitched the last two innings to finish the game and allowed the last four runs of the 18 total scored on five hits. After his major league appearance, he continued to play in the minor leagues. His last professional season was with the Waynesboro Villagers of the Blue Ridge League in 1924.

He was born in Baltimore, Maryland and died in Front Royal, Virginia at the age of 59. He was buried at Cedar Hill Cemetery in Suitland, Maryland.
