= John Due House =

- Location within Maryland
- 39°12′10″N 76°55′12″W
- Nearest city: Clarksville, Maryland

History
- Built: 18th century

Site notes
- Architectural styles: Stone, Federal

John Due House or Henry Warfield House, is a historic slave plantation located in Clarksville in Howard County, Maryland, United States.

The Stone house resides at 6044 Trotter Road, a road named after Emma and John Trotter who owned the property in the 1930s. The 18th century kitchen predates the 1836 additions. The property includes a slave quarters, corn crib and smokehouse. It was built for Benjamin Franklin Warfield with his nephew Nicholas Warfield. By the 1960s the property was subdivided down to 29.47 acres. John L Due performed a restoration with a recommendation that the property should be added to the National Register.

== See also ==
- Clifton (Clarksville, Maryland)
