= Lefty Clarke =

American baseball player (1896–1975)

Alan Thomas Clarke
- Pitcher
- Born: March 8, 1896; Clarksville, Maryland
- Died: March 11, 1975 (aged 79); Cheverly, Maryland
- Batted: Both Threw: Left

MLB debut
- October 2, 1921, for the Cincinnati Reds

Last MLB appearance
- October 2, 1921, for the Cincinnati Reds

MLB statistics
- Win–loss record: 0–1
- Earned run average: 5.40
- Strikeouts: 1
- Stats at Baseball Reference

Teams
- Cincinnati Reds (1921)

Alan "Lefty" Thomas Clarke (March 8, 1896 – March 11, 1975) was an American professional baseball player who played one game for the Cincinnati Reds in 1921. He recorded one strike out while surrendering 7 runs (3 earned) on seven hits and two walks. He was born in Clarksville, Maryland and died at the age of 79 in Cheverly, Maryland.
