= Clifton (Clarksville, Maryland) =

Historic 1818 building in Howard County, MD, United States

Welling's Stone House
- Interactive map of the Welling's Stone House area
- Former names: Clifton

General information
- Type: Stone
- Location: 6420 Warm Sunshine Path, Clarksville, Maryland
- Coordinates: 39.193209°N 76.926990°W
- Completed: 1818

Height
- Roof: Shingle

Welling's Stone House or Clifton is a historic stone house situated between Clarksville, Maryland and Fulton, Maryland.

Clifton was built on a tract of 2500 acres of land patented as "White Wine & Claret" in 1702 by John Dorsey. The land was inherited by Dorsey's grandsons, Charles and William Ridgley. The tract was divided into an 820-acre tract for William Ridgley, 930 for Charles Ridgley, and 234 acres to John Ridgley. The house was situated along Guilford road, one of the region's earliest "rolling roads" where tobacco would be transported from slave plantations by rolling hogshead containers to docks at Annapolis.

William Welling built the two and a half stories tall house with stone construction. The property was surrounded by 238 acres of farm fields until it was purchased by the Rouse Company division, Howard Research and Development for subdivision. A portion of the property was used for recreation vehicle parking for the Columbia development for several years. The barns were removed, and the address was changed to a cul-de-sac address on Warm Sunshine Path. The Welling cemetery has been fenced in with new gravestone markers.

== See also ==
- John Due House
