= River Hill High School =

Public high school in Clarksville, Maryland, U.S.

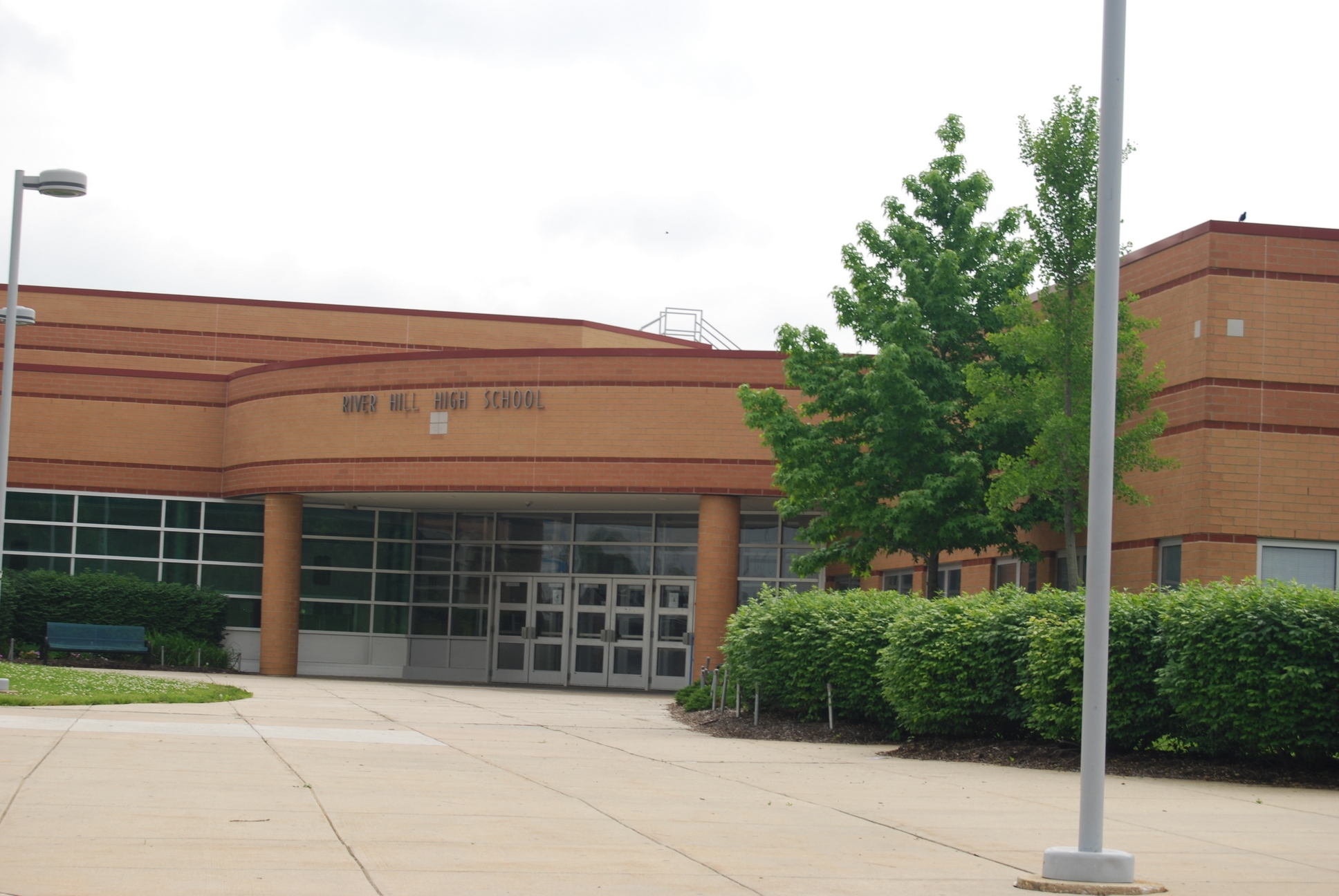

Location
- 12101 Route 108; Clarksville, Maryland 21029; United States; 39.21511°N 76.92928°W

Information
- School type: Public High School
- Opened: 1996
- School district: Howard County Public Schools
- Principal: John DiFato
- Grades: 9–12
- Language: English
- Campus: Suburban
- Colors: Blue and Gold
- Mascot: Hawks
- Newspaper: The Current
- Yearbook: Talon
- Website: rhhs.hcpss.org

River Hill High School is a public high school in Clarksville, Maryland. It is part of the Howard County Public School System.

== Principals ==
- Scott Pfeifer 1996–2004
- Bill Ryan 2004–2010
- Nick Novak 2010–2015
- Kathryn McKinley 2015–2020
- Mikaela Lidgard 2020–2023
- Robert Motley 2023–2024
- John DiFato 2024–present

== Awards ==
In 2007, River Hill High School was among 290 schools to be nominated as a National Blue Ribbon School by the United States Department of Education.

River Hill was recognized in 2008 by BusinessWeek as having the "Best Overall Academic Performance" in Maryland.

The school was awarded a 2009 Best High School silver medal by U.S. News & World Report. Silver medals are given to high schools that are not ranked in the national top 100, but have a college readiness index of at least 20.

River Hill is the home of Alliance Rocket, co-winners of the SPHERES Challenge 2011 Championship on the International Space Station.

In its 2012 rankings of the best high schools in the nation, U.S. News & World Report ranked River Hill the 10th best high school in Maryland and 236th best in the country. It improved its ranking to 165th in 2014. This ranking fell to 394th in 2025, though its ranking within Maryland rose to 7th.

== Notable alumni ==
- Beau Brade, college football defensive back for the University of Maryland and safety for the National Football League's Cincinnati Bengals
- Tommy Brenton, basketball player
- Michael Campanaro, former National Football League wide receiver
- Kevin Johnson, former cornerback for the Cleveland Browns
- Donovan Pines, former soccer player for the University of Maryland
- Ryan Pinkston, actor
- Kate Hackett, actor
