= Clarksville, Maryland =

Unincorporated community in Maryland, United States

Coordinates: 39°12′23″N 76°56′35″W

- Unincorporated community
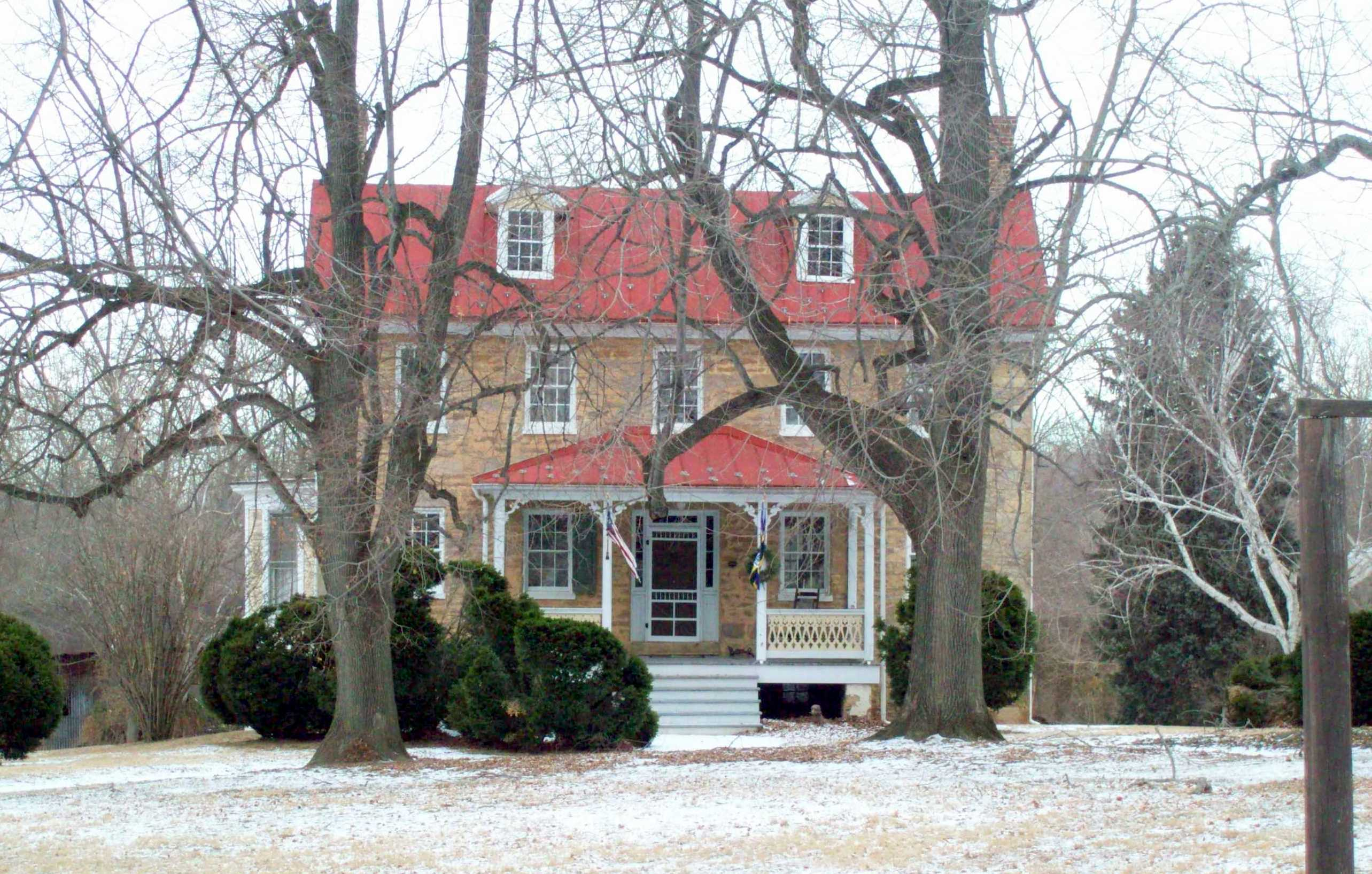
- Montrose Manor in Clarksville
- Interactive map of Clarksville, Maryland
- Country: United States
- State: Maryland
- County: Howard
- Founded: July 4, 1851
- Founder: William Clark

Government
  - County Councilwoman: Deb Jung; District 4
- Time zone: UTC−5 (Eastern (EST))
  - Summer (DST): UTC−4 (EDT)
- ZIP Code: 21029
- Area codes: 410 & 443

Clarksville is an unincorporated community in Howard County, Maryland; the second highest-earning county in the United States according to the U.S. Census Bureau. The community is named for William Clark, a farmer who owned much of the land on which the community now lies and served as a postal stop that opened on the 4th of July 1851.

Montrose and Richland Farm are listed on the National Register of Historic Places in 1973.

== History ==
In 1699, Thomas Browne, a Patuxent Ranger, ranged the river from the Snowden plantation to where Clarksville is sited. The area was settled with tobacco plantations such as Folly Quarter and Hobbs Regulation with slave labor. In 1838, Dr. William Watkins of Richland Manor proposed the "Howard District" of Anne Arundel County, which became Howard County in 1851. Clarksville's name originates from John R. Clark's family who immigrated from Ireland to the Howard District of Anne Arundel County in 1790. The land he purchased included Jack Howard's blacksmith shop, one of the few African American operated blacksmith's in the county. Clarksville postal office listed the population as just 65 in the 1930s with the key industry of agriculture and limestone mining. Numerous apple orchards were situated between Clarksville and Ashton. In 1869 the town became the terminus of the ten mile Ellicott City and Clarksville turnpike built over the old Sandy Spring road, a ten-mile private toll road created in a time before county maintained roads which later became route 108.

== Schooling ==
There are four public schools located in Clarksville, Maryland. There are two elementary schools, Pointers Run Elementary School and Clarksville Elementary School, while there is one middle school, Clarksville Middle School, and one high school, River Hill High School. All four schools are part of the Howard County Public School System (HCPSS).

== Climate ==
The climate in this area is characterized by hot, humid summers and generally mild to cool winters. According to the Köppen Climate Classification system, Clarksville has a humid subtropical climate, abbreviated "Cfa" on climate maps.

== People ==
The following are notable people who were born or live in Clarksville, Maryland:

- Lefty Clarke, Major League Baseball pitcher who played in one game on October 2, 1921.
- Kevin Johnson, retired NFL cornerback.
- Donovan Pines EFL League 1, player for Barnsley F.C.
- Varun Ram, former Maryland Terrapins basketball player.
- Beau Brade, current Baltimore Ravens football player.

== See also ==
- Clifton (Clarksville, Maryland) – an 1818 stone home built on the "White Wine & Claret" farm of John Dorsey
- Worthington's Range
- Montrose
- Richland Farm
- Walnut Grove
