= Hanover Tigers =

- 1896; Hanover, Pennsylvania

Minor league affiliations
- Class: Independent (1896)
- League: Cumberland Valley League (1896)

Major league affiliations
- Team: None

Minor league titles
- League titles (O): None

Team data
- Name: Hanover Tigers (1896)
- Ballpark: Unknown (1896)

The Hanover Tigers were a minor league baseball team based in Hanover, Pennsylvania. In 1896, the Tigers played as members of the Cumberland Valley League in the league's only season of play. Hanover finished in last place in the league standings.

== History ==
Minor league baseball began in Hanover, Pennsylvania in 1896, when the Hanover Tigers became charter members of the four–team Cumberland Valley League. The Carlisle Colts, Chambersburg Maroons and Hagerstown Lions teams joined Hanover in beginning league play on June 10, 1896.

Hanover finished the 1896 season in last place and briefly relocated during the season. On August 1, 1896, the team briefly transferred to York, Pennsylvania before moving back to Hanover on August 8, 1896. With a record of 12–25, playing the season under managers Barnie Mulhall and Bobby Rothermel, the Tigers finished in fourth place. Hanover finished 13.5 games behind the first place Hagerstown Lions. The Cumberland Valley League permanently folded after the season.

In 1915, minor league baseball returned to the city, as the Hanover Hornets began a long tenure of Hanover playing as members of the Class D level Blue Ridge League.

In 2017, the Hanover Raiders nickname was revived by the collegiate summer baseball team based in Hanover that began play as a member of the South Penn League.

== The ballparks ==
The name of the Hanover Tigers' 1896 home ballpark is not directly referenced.

== Year-by-year record ==
Year	Record	Finish	Manager	Playoffs/Notes
1896	12–25	4th	Barnie Mulhall / Bobby Rothermel	Hanover moved to York August 1 York moved to Hanover August 8

== Notable alumni ==
- Alexander Donoghue (1896)
- Charlie Gettig (1896)
- Dan Kerwin (1896)
- Gene McCann (1896)
- Bobby Rothermel (1896, MGR)
- Nick Scharf (1896)

== See also ==
Hanover Tigers players
