= Cumberland Valley League =

1896 baseball minor league

- Classification: Independent (1896)
- Sport: Minor League Baseball
- First season: 1896
- Folded: 1896
- President: Eugene S. Faber (1896)
- No. of teams: 4
- Country: United States of America
- Most titles: 1 Hagerstown Lions (1896)
- Related competitions: Naugatuck Valley League

The Cumberland Valley League was a four–team Independent level baseball minor league that played in the 1896 season. The Cumberland League featured franchises based in Maryland and Pennsylvania. The Cumberland Valley League permanently folded after playing the 1896 season.

== History ==
Before becoming a minor league, a semi–professional league named the "Cumberland Valley League" played in the 1895 season.

The Cumberland Valley League was first organized as a minor league on May 15, 1896. The Cumberland Valley League formed as an Independent level league. The Carlisle Colts, Chambersburg Maroons, Hagerstown Lions and Hanover Tigers were the charter members beginning play the four–team league. The league president was Eugene S. Faber.

The Cumberland Valley League began play on June 10, 1896. During the season, the Hanover Lions relocated to York, Pennsylvania, on August 1, 1894, and back to Hanover on August 8. On August 7, 1894, the Chambersburg Maroons folded, causing the Cumberland Valley League to permanently fold on August 9, 1896, with only three teams remaining.

The Final Cumberland Valley League standings were led by the first place Hagerstown Lions. Hagerstown had a 26–12 record. The Chambersburg Maroons finished 3.0 games behind Hagerstown with a 22–14 record, followed by the Carlisle Colts (14–13) and Hanover Tigers/York (12–25).

The Cumberland Valley League played only the 1896 season as a minor league.

== Cumberland Valley League teams ==
Team name(s)	City represented	Ballpark	Year active
Carlisle Colts	Carlisle, Pennsylvania	Unknown	1896
Chambersburg Maroons	Chambersburg, Pennsylvania	Wolf Park	1896
Hagerstown Lions	Hagerstown, Maryland	Unknown	1896
Hanover Tigers	Hanover, Pennsylvania	Unknown	1896
York	York, Pennsylvania	League Park	1896

== Standings & statistics ==
=== 1896 Cumberland Valley League ===
Team standings	W	L	PCT	GB	Managers
Hagerstown Lions	26	12	.684	–	Unknown
Chambersburg Maroons	22	14	.611	3	Clay Henninger / Billy Goeckel
Carlisle Colts	14	23	.378	11½	Unknown
Hanover Tigers / York	12	25	.324	13½	Barnie Mulhall / Bobby Rothermel

Player statistics
Player	Team	Stat	Tot	Player	Team	Stat	Tot
Natty Nattress	Hagerstown	Runs	40	Thomas Lipp	Hagerstown	W	10
William Graffius	Hagerstown	Hits	52	Charlie Gettig	Hanover	SO	73
Harry Tate	Hagerstown	HR	6	Thomas Lipp	Hagerstown	PCT	.833; 10–2
