= Hanover Raiders =

- 1916–1929; (1915–1917, 1920–1929); Hanover, Pennsylvania

Minor league affiliations
- Class: Class D (1915–1917, 1920–1929)
- League: Blue Ridge League (1915–1917, 1920–1929)

Major league affiliations
- Team: None

Minor league titles
- League titles (1): 1928

Team data
- Name: Hanover Hornets (1915); Hanover Raiders (1916–1917, 1920–1929)
- Ballpark: McAllister Field (1915–1917); Young's Field (1920–1929)

The Hanover Raiders were a minor league baseball team based in Hanover, Pennsylvania. Between 1915 and 1929, Hanover teams played exclusively as members of the Blue Ridge League from 1915 to 1917 and 1920 to 1929, winning the 1928 league championship. The 1915 Hanover Hornets preceded the Raiders, as Hanover played minor league home games at McAllister Field and then Young's Field

== History ==
=== Blue Ridge League: 1915 to 1917 ===
Minor league baseball began in Hanover, Pennsylvania in 1896, when the Hanover Tigers became members of the four–team Cumberland Valley League, finishing last in the league's only season of play.

In 1915, minor league baseball returned as Hanover began a long tenure as charter members of the Class D level Blue Ridge League. In their opening game, Hanover lost to the Gettysburg Patriots 5–0. The 1915 Hanover Hornets finished the season with a record of 42–35 to place third under manager William Starr. Hanover finished 11.5 games behind the first place Frederick Hustlers. Pitcher Willie Sherdel of Hanover led the league with a 15–3 record.

Continuing play, the 1916 the "Hanover Raiders" nickname appeared for the first time and would remain the team moniker. Hanover ended the Blue Ridge League season in fourth place. The Raiders ended the 1916 with a record of 46–48 under returning manager William Starr and finished 7.5 games behind the first place Chambersburg Maroons.

The 1917 Hanover Raiders placed fourth in the Blue Ridge League with a record of 44–52. Rabbit Agnew, Monte Cross, Earle Mack and Buck Elliott served as managers. The Raiders finished 16.5 games behind the 1first place Hagerstown Terriers in the final standings. Hanover did not return to the Blue Ridge League in 1918 as the league reduced to four teams.

=== Blue Ridge League: 1920 to 1929 ===
The 1920 Hanover Raiders returned to play following World War I, as Hanover rejoined the reformed six–team Blue Ridge League. The league reformed after not playing the 1919 season. The Chambersburg Maroons, Frederick Hustlers, Hagerstown Champs, Martinsburg Mountaineers and Waynesboro Villagers joined Hanover in beginning league play on May 10, 1920.

On May 19, 1920, Hanover lost their opening day game on the road, 11–0 at the Waynesboro Villagers.

Hanover finished the 1920 season in last place in the Blue Ridge League standings. The Raiders finished the season with a record of 37–60 to place sixth, playing the season under managers Karl Kolseth and Bert Weeden. Hanover finished 19.5 games behind the first place Hagerstown Champs in the final standings as the league had no playoffs until 1926.

Continuing play in 1921, the Hanover Raiders placed second in the six–team Blue Ridge League. Hanover finished the season with a 52–40 record under returning manager Bert Weeden to finish 4.0 games behind the first place Frederick Hustlers. Bill Goff of Hanover won the Blue Ridge League batting title, hitting .384.

In 1922, the Raiders placed fourth in the Blue Ridge League final standings. With a 47–49 record under manager Joe Miller, Hanover finished in 9.5 games behind the first place Martinsburg Blue Sox. Beginning in 1922 and continuing through 1927, the champion of the Blue Ridge League played the champion of the Eastern Shore League in a championship playoff called the "Five-State Championship Series".

The 1923 Hanover Raiders placed third in the Blue Ridge League standings. The Raiders finished with a record 49–50 under managers George Wilson and Frank Caporal. Hanover finished 19.0 games behind the first place Martinsburg Blue Sox in the final standings.

On July 5, 1924, player/manager Walter Halas of Hanover pitched a no-hitter. Halas, the brother of George Halas, defeated the Chambersburg Maroons 5–1 in the contest.

In 1924, the Hanover Raiders finished the season with a record of 44–52 record to place fourth in the Blue Ridge League. Playing under managers Frank Caporal and Walter Halas, the Raiders finished 14.5 games behind the champion Martinsburg Blue Sox.

The Hanover Raiders finished last the 1925 season. With a record of 33–60, Hanover placed sixth under managers Roy Clunk and Howard Brown the six–team Blue Ridge League. The Raiders finished 28.5 games behind the first place Hagerstown Hubs in the final standings.

Continuing Blue Ridge League play in 1926, Hanover placed fourth. With a record of 46–51, playing under manager Buck Ramsey, the Raiders finished 19.0 games behind the first place Hagerstown Hubs. On June 16, 1926, Frank Roscoe of Hanover threw a no–hitter against the Martinsburg Blue Sox in a 6–1 Hanover victory.

The 1927 Hanover Raiders finished the season with a record of 50–49 under managers George Hammen and Mike Konnick. The Raiders placed fourth in the Blue Ridge League and ended the season 15.0 games behind the first place Chambersburg Maroons in the final standings.

The 1928 Hanover Raiders captured the Blue Ridge League championship. The Raiders ended the regular season with a record of 59–38 to place first in the final standings. Managed by Jess Altenberg, George Hammen and George Burns, Hanover finished just 0.5 game ahead of the second place Chambersburg Maroons in the final standings. Hanover and Chambersburg each won portions of the split season schedule. In the Finals, the Hanover Raiders defeated the Chambersburg Maroons 4 games to 1. Beginning in 1928, the Blue Ridge League champion was matched in a championship series with the champion of the Middle Atlantic League in the "Tri-State Series."

In their final season of play, the 1929 Hanover Raiders placed fourth in the Blue Ridge League. Hanover finished the regular season with a record of 58–58 behind manager Bob Prysock in the six–team Blue Ridge League. Hanover finished their final season 11.0 games behind the first place Martinsburg Blue Sox in the final standings.

In its final season of play, the 1930 Blue Ridge League compacted to four teams, greatly affected by the stock market crash of 1929. Hanover did not return to play in 1930. Hanover, Pennsylvania has not hosted another minor league team.

Beginning in 2017, the "Hanover Raiders" nickname was revived by the collegiate summer baseball team in Hanover, Pennsylvania team that plays as a member of the South Penn League.

== The ballparks ==
From 1915 to 1917 the Hanover minor league teams played home games at McAllister Field.

Beginning in 1920, McAllister Field was renamed and the Hanover Raiders minor league teams played home games at Young's Field. It was noted that Young's Field had no outfield fences and was named after the family who owned the property.

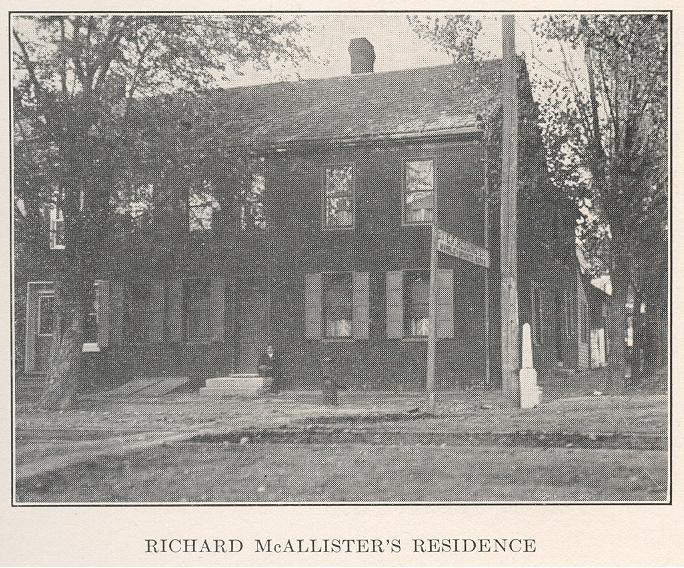
(1915) Richard McAllister Residence Hanover, Pennsylvania

== Timeline ==
Year(s)	# Yrs.	Team	Level	League	Ballpark
1915	1	Hanover Hornets	Class D	Blue Ridge League	McAllister Field
1916–1917	2	Hanover Raiders	Class D	Blue Ridge League	McAllister Field
1920–1929	10	Hanover Raiders	Class D	Blue Ridge League	Young's Field

== Year-by-year records ==
Year	Record	Finish	Manager	Playoffs/Notes
1915	42–35	3rd	William Starr	No playoffs held
1916	46–48	4th	William Starr	No playoffs held
1917	44–52	4th	Rabbit Agnew / Monte Cross; Earle Mack / Buck Elliott	No playoffs held
1920	37-60	6th	Karl Kolseth / Bert Weeden	No playoffs held
1921	52–40	2nd	Bert Weeden	No playoffs held
1922	47–49	4th	Joe Miller	No playoffs held
1923	49–50	3rd	George Wilson / Frank Caporal	No playoffs held
1924	44–52	4th	Frank Caporal / Walter Halas	No playoffs held
1925	33–60	6th	Roy Clunk / Howard Brown	No playoffs held
1926	46–51	4th	Buck Ramsey	Did not qualify
1927	50–49	4th	George Hammen / Mike Konnick	Did not qualify
1928	59–38	1st	Jess Altenberg; George Hammen / George Burns	League Champs
1929	58–58	4th	Bob Prysock	Did not qualify

== Notable alumni ==
- Henry T. Bream (1928-1920)
- George Burns (1928)
- Ownie Carroll (1921)
- Jimmy Dykes (1917) 2x MLB All-Star
- Al Grabowski (1923)
- Hal Haid (1917)
- Walter Halas (1924, MGR)
- Luke Hamlin (1928)
- Walt Herrell (1920)
- Ducky Holmes (1920)
- Karl Kolseth (1920, MGR)
- Frank Loftus (1921-1922)
- Earle Mack (1917, MGR)
- Ben Mallonee (1916)
- Johnny Morrison (1917)
- Doc Ozmer (1925)
- Norman Plitt (1915)
- Ed Roetz (1926-1927)
- Frank Rooney (1916)
- Bill Sherdel (1915-1916)
- Scottie Slayback (1925)
- Walt Smallwood (1915)
- Johnny Tillman (1917)
- Al Todd (1928)
- Bert Weeden (1920, MGR), (1921-1922)
- Kemp Wicker (1929)
- Rube Yarrison (1920)

== See also ==
Hanover Raiders players
Hanover Hornets players
