= Gettysburg Ponies =

- 1916–1917; (1915–1917); Gettysburg, Pennsylvania

Minor league affiliations
- Class: Class D (1915–1917)
- League: Blue Ridge League (1915–1917)

Major league affiliations
- Team: None

Minor league titles
- League titles (0): None

Team data
- Name: Gettysburg Patriots (1915); Gettysburg Ponies (1916–1917)
- Ballpark: Nixon Field (1915–1917)

The Gettysburg Ponies were a minor league baseball team based in Gettysburg, Pennsylvania. From 1915 to 1917, Gettysburg teams played exclusively as members of the Class D level Blue Ridge League, beginning play in 1915 as the Gettysburg "Patriots." Gettysburg hosted minor league home games at Nixon Field

== History ==
In 1915, minor league baseball play in Gettysburg began, as the Gettysburg Patriots became charter members of the six-team, Class D level Blue Ridge League. The Chambersburg Maroons, Frederick Hustlers, Hagerstown Blues, Hanover Hornets and Martinsburg Champs joined Gettysburg in beginning league play on May 27, 1915.

In their first game, the opening game to begin the 1915 season, Gettysburg defeated the Hanover Hornets 5–0 at Hanover.

On June 8, 1915, Gettysburg was defeated by the Martinsburg Champions 9–8 in a game at Willow Lane Park in Hagerstown, Maryland.

The 1915 Gettysburg Patriots ended their first Blue Ridge League season in fifth place. The Patriots ended the season with a record of 28–48, playing the season under manager Ira Plane. Gettysburg finished 25.0 games behind the first place Frederick Hustlers in the final standings, as the league held no playoffs.

Hosting home games at Nixon Field on the campus of Gettysburg College had some negative ramifications. Because of the location of the ballpark, fans could easily watch the game from nearby streets, avoiding having to pay admission. Also, automobiles that parked alongside the ballpark, which had no outfield fence, were a hazard to players chasing down fly balls. Baseballs in play also rolled underneath vehicles parked at the corners of the outfield.

Before the 1916 season began, the club needed to resolve the fact that the team was known by two names. Their official Blue Ridge League name was the Gettysburg Patriots, but local newspapers called them the "Braves." Before the 1916 season began, a meeting was held where stockholders of the Patriots elected new directors and announced that 55 shares of stock in the team had sold at $20 per share to provide revenue for the team.

A new nickname was given to the 1916 team, as reported in the Frederick Post: "In order to do away with the confusion caused by giving the two different names, the Patriots and the Braves, a compromise has been reached and the Gettysburg team will be known in the future as Plank's Ponies." Plank referred to manager Ira Plank, who was the brother of Baseball Hall of Fame member Eddie Plank.

Continuing play in the 1916 Blue Ridge League, the Gettysburg "Ponies", finished last in the standings. The Ponies ended the Blue Ridge League season in sixth place. Gettysburg ended the 1916 season with a record of 35–56, playing under returning manager Ira Plank and finished 17.0 games behind the first place Chambersburg Maroons.

Due to financial and salary concerns, some Ponies players were creative in trying to earn extra money. Jimmy Dykes reported later that some of the players on the Gettysburg team traveled to some of the other league clubs to try and play under an alias to earn additional some money. Their efforts failed when they were recognized by one of the opposing managers. This issued was called to the attention of league president J. Vincent Jamison in late July, 1916. Jamison took the franchise away from Gettysburg and began talking with Piedmont, West Virginia and York, Pennsylvania, representatives about taking the team. Local Gettysburg business leaders organized and collected the minimum funds to keep the club running for the remainder of the season. After a guarantee to the league that the funds were available, Jamison agreed to return the club back to Gettysburg a week later.

In their final season of play, the 1917 Gettysburg Ponies placed third in the Blue Ridge League final standings. Gettysburg ended the season with a record of 48–46, playing under managers Joe Ward and John Mumford. The Ponies finished 11.5 games behind the first place Hagerstown Terriers in the final standings.

The Gettysburg and Hanover teams did not return to the 1918 Blue Ridge League, as the league reduced from six teams to four teams while continuing play during World War I and facing challenges due to the Spanish flu epidemic. The league folded during the 1918 season. Gettysburg has not hosted another minor league team.

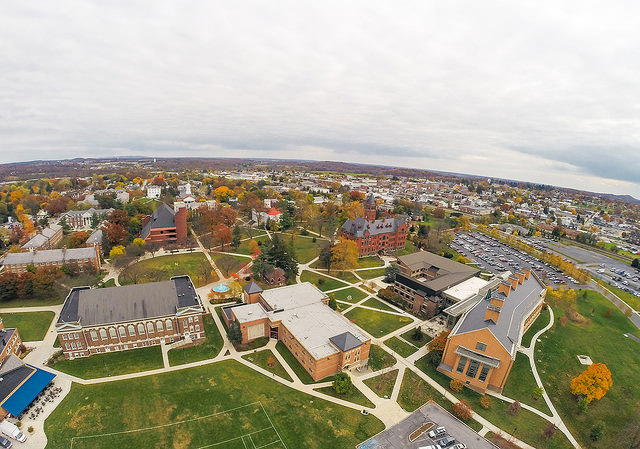
(2015) Gettysburg College campus. Gettysburg, Pennsylvania

== The ballpark ==
From 1915 to 1917 the Gettysburg minor league teams played home games at Nixon Field. The ballpark had no outfield fences and was plagued by automobiles parked near the diamond interfering with live baseballs and providing seating for fans wishing to avoid paying admission. Nixon Field was located at North Washington Street & East Stevens Street on the campus of Gettysburg College.

== Timeline ==
Year(s)	# Yrs.	Team	Level	League	Ballpark
1915	1	Gettysburg Patriots	Class D	Blue Ridge League	Nixon Field
1916–1917	2	Gettysburg Ponies	Class D	Blue Ridge League	Nixon Field

== Year–by–year records ==
Year	Record	Finish	Manager	Playoffs/Notes
1915	28–48	5th	Ira Plank	No playoffs held
1916	35–56	4th	Ira Plank	No playoffs held
1917	48–46	3rd	Joe Ward / John Mumford	No playoffs held

== Notable alumni ==
- Ivan Bigler (1915–1916)
- Bill Clay (1915)
- Snake Deal (1915)
- Jimmy Dykes (1917) 2xMLB All-Star
- Walt Herrell (1915)
- Arthur S. Herman (1916)
- Earl Howard (1915)
- Bill Steele (1916)
- Elmer Steele (1916)
- Ross Swartz (1915)
- Joe Ward (1917, MGR)
- John W. Weimer (1915)

=== See also ===
Gettysburg Patriots players
Gettysburg Ponies players
