= Arthur Herman =

Arthur Herman may refer to:

- Art Herman (1871–1955), American professional baseball player
- Arthur S. Herman (1891–1977), American professional baseball player and coach
- Arthur Herman (author) (born 1956), American author and popular historian

== See also ==
- Arthur Hermann (1893–1958), French gymnast
- Herman Arthur (1892–1920), Afro-American World War I veteran who was lynched
