= Youngstown Buckeyes =

- 1932; (1931-1932); Youngstown, Ohio

Minor league affiliations
- Previous classes: Class B (1932); Class C (1931)
- League: Central League (1932)
- Previous leagues: Middle Atlantic League (1931)

Team data
- Previous names: Youngstown Buckeyes (1932); Youngstown Tubers (1931)
- Previous parks: Idora Park

The Youngstown Buckeyes were a minor league baseball team in Youngstown, Ohio that played in the Central League in 1932. In 1929, Joe Cambria purchased the Hagerstown Hubs. In 1931, Hagerstown was playing in the Class C Middle Atlantic League, and Cambria moved the team, first to Parkersburg, West Virginia, and later that summer to Youngstown, where they played as the Youngstown Tubers. In 1932, the Youngstown team joined the Class B Central League and were named the Youngstown Buckeyes.

== 1932 season ==
Tony Citrano was named as the team's manager, and Alex Pisula was the business manager. The team played its home games at Idora Park. The Central League played a split season format and consisted of six teams—Akron (later replaced by Canton), Dayton, Erie, Fort Wayne, and South Bend, in addition to Youngstown. The Dayton Ducks won the first half title, with the Buckeyes finishing in third place with a 36–33 record.

In the second half, Canton and South Bend were unable to finish the season, so the season ended with four teams still in the league. Fort Wayne won the second half title, and Youngstown finished in third place with a 35–36 record.

== Players ==
Several Youngstown Buckeyes players advanced to play in the major leagues. The following players played at least 500 games in the majors:

- Babe Phelps was a catcher for the Washington Senators, Chicago Cubs, Brooklyn Dodgers, and Pittsburgh Pirates. Though a catcher for most of his career, at Youngstown he mostly played first base.
- Jake Powell was an outfielder for the Washington Senators, New York Yankees, and Philadelphia Phillies.

The following pitchers pitched at least 125 games or 500 innings in the majors:

- Bud Thomas played for the Washington Senators, Philadelphia Athletics and Detroit Tigers.
