= Ben Mallonee =

American baseball player (1894–1978)

Howard Bennett Mallonee
- Outfielder
- Born: March 31, 1894; Baltimore, Maryland, U.S.
- Died: February 19, 1978 (aged 83); Baltimore, Maryland, U.S.
- Batted: Left Threw: Left

MLB debut
- September 14, 1921, for the Philadelphia Athletics

Last MLB appearance
- September 23, 1921, for the Philadelphia Athletics

MLB statistics
- At bats: 25
- RBI: 4
- Home runs: 0
- Batting average: .240
- Stats at Baseball Reference

Teams
- Philadelphia Athletics 1921

Howard Bennett "Lefty" Mallonee (March 31, 1894 – February 19, 1978) was an American professional baseball player who played in seven games for the Philadelphia Athletics during the 1921 season. He was born in Baltimore, Maryland and died there at the age of 83.

He began his professional career in 1916 with the class D Blue Ridge League playing for the Chambersburg Maroons and the Hanover Hornets. After his time in the major leagues, he returned to the minor leagues, playing for several more years. His overall batting average in the minor leagues was .322. His best year was in 1924 with the Richmond Colts of the class B Virginia League, when he had an batting average of .368 in 546 at bats. He played his last season in the minor leagues with the Spartanburg, Greenville and Asheville of the South Atlantic League in 1929.
