= Mike Mowrey =

American baseball player (1884–1947)

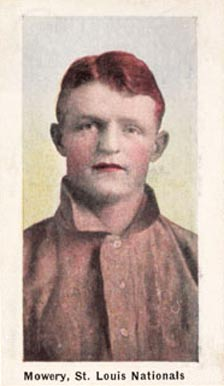
- Third baseman
- Born: March 24, 1884; Browns Mill, Pennsylvania, U.S.
- Died: March 20, 1947 (aged 62); Chambersburg, Pennsylvania, U.S.
- Batted: Right Threw: Right

MLB debut
- September 24, 1905, for the Cincinnati Reds

Last MLB appearance
- August 13, 1917, for the Brooklyn Robins

MLB statistics
- Batting average: .256
- Home runs: 7
- Runs batted in: 461
- Stolen bases: 167
- Stats at Baseball Reference

Teams
- Cincinnati Reds (1905–1909); St. Louis Cardinals (1909–1913); Pittsburgh Pirates (1914); Pittsburgh Rebels (1915); Brooklyn Robins (1916–1917)

Career highlights and awards
- 1916 National League Pennant

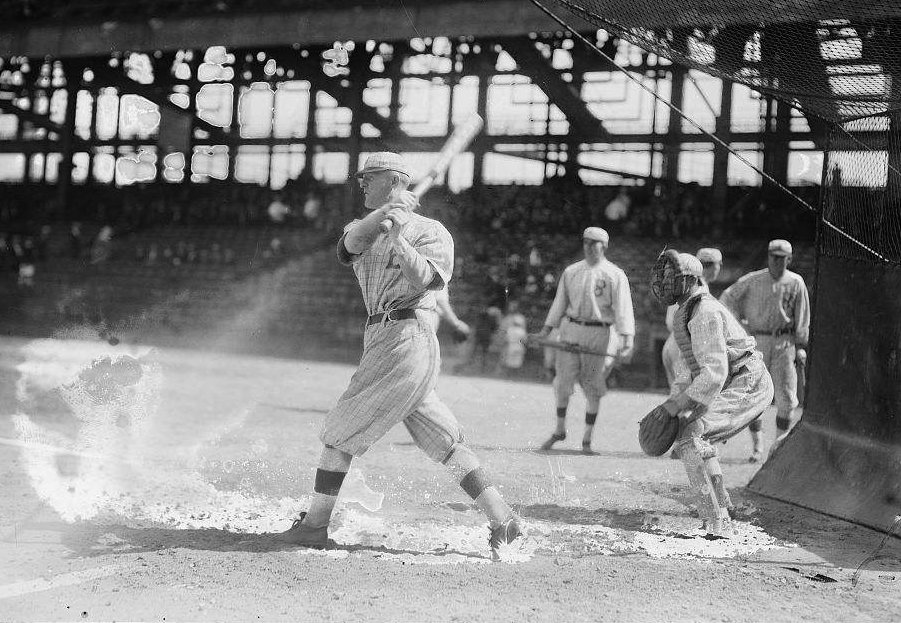
Mowrey batting for Brooklyn in 1916

Harry Harlan Mowrey (March 24, 1884 – March 20, 1947) was an American professional baseball third baseman who played in the Major Leagues from 1905 to 1917. He also later played for the Cincinnati Reds, St. Louis Cardinals, Brooklyn Robins, and Pittsburgh Pirates.

== Biography ==
Mowrey grew up playing baseball with school and town teams in the Chambersburg, Pennsylvania area. His father, Jacob Mowrey, was the town's sheriff, and frequently housed homeless people in his jail cell overnight. Young Harry became particularly friendly with one of the inmates, prompting one of his brothers to nickname him "Mike the Hobo."

By the turn of the century, Mowry was a third baseman for the Chambersburg Academy, playing well enough in 1902 to earn a shot with a team from Chester, Pennsylvania, just south of Philadelphia, in the independent Pennsylvania League.

Mowrey returned to central Pennsylvania with Williamsport of the independent Tri-State League in 1904, the same year he married Nannie K. Hammel. The couple would remain married until his death forty-three years later.

In 1905, Mowrey joined the ranks of affiliated baseball with Savannah of the South Atlantic League. His .285 batting average and flashy defensive play at third base so impressed the Cincinnati Reds that they purchased his contract.

Mowrey made his first major league debut on September 24, 1905, playing both games of a doubleheader. He appeared in seven games that season, batting .267 but making seven errors at third base. Mowrey spent most of 1906 with Baltimore of the Eastern League, which was owned by Cincinnati manager Ned Hanlon. The Reds recalled him in August to avoid losing him in the minor-league draft, and Mowrey hit .321 in 21 games.

In 1907, Mowrey was the regular third baseman for Cincinnati, playing in 138 games and hitting .252. He hit an inside-the-park home run against Joe McGinnity on August 14. Mowrey hit only .220 and lost his starting position to Hans Lobertin 1908. He hurt his knee in 1909 and was hitting just .191 when the Reds traded him to St. Louis on August 22 for infielder Chappy Charles. Returning to regular duty with the Cardinals in 1910, Mowrey enjoyed the best season of his 13-year career, hitting .282, a career-high 70 RBIs, and 21 stolen bases. He remained the Cardinals' regular third baseman through the end of 1913, collecting at least 400 at-bats each year and hitting between .255 and .268.

Mowrey was best known for his unorthodox fielding style. Instead of catching a hard smash in his glove, he would knock the ball to the ground and then pick it up to throw out the runner. Defending against the bunt was a corner infielder's primary responsibility during the Deadball Era, and in 1910 Alfred H. Spink called Mowrey "the best fielder of bunts in either league."

The Cardinals sent Mowrey to the Pittsburgh Pirates on December 12, 1913, in the "famous three-for-five deal." St. Louis traded Mowrey, first-baseman Ed Konetchy, and pitcher Bob Harmon to Pittsburgh for infielders Dots Miller and Art Butler, outfielders Chief Wilson and Cozy Dolan, and pitcher Hank Robinson. Hampered by injuries, Mowrey played in only 79 games for the Pirates before drawing his unconditional release. He played with some independent teams to finish out the 1914 season.

In 1915, Mowrey remained in Pittsburgh with the Federal League's Pittsburgh Rebels, hitting .280 and leading all Federal League third basemen with a .959 fielding percentage. He also established career highs in games (151), hits (146), and stolen bases (40). After the Federal League folded, Wilbert Robinson signed Mowrey for his veteran team in Brooklyn. That year, he batted .244 in 144 games and his career-best .965 fielding percentage led National League third basemen and the Robins won the pennant. Appearing in his first World Series, Mowrey hit only .176 in Brooklyn's losing effort.

In 1917, the thirty-three-year-old third baseman held out for more money, not reporting until April 10. Mowrey batted just .214 and the Robins released him in August, ending his major league career.

Mowrey subsequently worked in a steel plant and played ball for Lebanon in the Steel League, alongside many other former major league players. In 1920 and 1921, Mowrey played for and managed the Hagerstown Hubs. He led Hagerstown to the championship of the Blue Ridge League in 1920, but the team finished last in 1921. In 1922 and 1923, Mowrey played for his hometown Chambersburg Maroons in the same league.

In 1926, Mowrey managed Rochester in the International League and Scottdale, Pennsylvania, in the Middle Atlantic League.

== Later years ==
Mowrey lived in Chambersburg for the remainder of his life. He bought some farmland and supplemented his farm income as a night watchman at Wilson College. During World War II, he worked at the Letterkenny Ordnance Depot and coached its baseball team.

== Death ==
Mowrey died from heart disease on March 20, 1947. Two months later, more than one thousand people attended a memorial service for him at Henninger Field after a Letterkenny game. According to the eulogy, "He was our Grand Old Man of Baseball, who started as a sandlotter and went to the top in baseball to become one of the greatest third basemen the game had known."
