= Mickey Keliher =

American baseball player (1890–1930)

- First baseman
- Born: January 11, 1890; Washington, D.C., U.S.
- Died: September 7, 1930 (aged 40); Washington, D.C., U.S.
- Batted: Left Threw: Left

MLB debut
- September 9, 1911, for the Pittsburgh Pirates

Last MLB appearance
- May 9, 1912, for the Pittsburgh Pirates

MLB statistics
- Batting average: .000
- Home runs: 0
- Runs batted in: 0
- Stats at Baseball Reference

Teams
- Pittsburgh Pirates (1911–1912)

Maurice Michael Keliher (January 11, 1890 – September 7, 1930) was an American professional baseball first baseman. He played in three games for the 1911 Pittsburgh Pirates and in 2 games for the 1912 Pirates. In 7 at-bats he never recorded a Major League hit.

He began his professional career in 1910 with Petersburg and Portsmouth of the Virginia League. After his major league appearances he continued to play in the minor leagues. He spent the last four years of his minor career (1926–1929) with the class D Blue Ridge League. In 1926, he led the Blue Ridge League with a .370 batting average. He was later a player/manager for the Chambersburg Maroons (1927–1928) and Hagerstown Hubs (1929).

In 1930, Keliher was killed in a car accident in Washington, D.C. Murder charges were filed against two men after witnesses stated they saw Keliher be thrown out of the car before the collision.
