= J. B. Hairstone =

- Outfielder
- Born: April 6, 1891; Martinsville, Virginia, U.S.
- Died: October 1978 (aged 87); Baltimore, Maryland, U.S.

Negro league baseball debut
- 1916

Last appearance
- 1922, for the Bacharach Giants

Teams
- Baltimore Black Sox (1918–1921); Bacharach Giants (1922)

James Burton Hairstone, also known as "Harry" (April 6, 1891 – October 1978), was an American professional baseball outfielder in the Negro leagues. He was described as a "brainy" player and was one of the "original" Baltimore Black Sox players, playing for the team during a period (1916–1921) when they were transitioning from a semipro team to a major professional team that would later be one of the founding members of the Eastern Colored League. In 1922, he finished his professional playing career with the Bacharach Giants. He was a manager late in his career, and also served as an umpire. In 1925, he was seriously injured by a bayonet wound suffered while serving at a National Guard encampment.

In 1933, Hairstone led a group that established a new, independent team that claimed the name of "Baltimore Black Sox", obtaining an injunction forcing Joe Cambria's Negro National League team to temporarily rename itself as the "Sox". Hairstone's team played at Maryland Baseball Park, while Cambria's team played at Bugle Field. Both teams folded in 1934.
