= Norman Plitt =

American baseball player (1893-1954)

- Pitcher
- Born: February 21, 1893; York, Pennsylvania, U.S.
- Died: February 1, 1954 (aged 60); New York City, U.S.
- Batted: Right Threw: Right

MLB debut
- April 26, 1918, for the Brooklyn Robins

Last MLB appearance
- September 26, 1927, for the New York Giants

MLB statistics
- Win–loss record: 3–6
- Earned run average: 4.77
- Strikeouts: 9
- Stats at Baseball Reference

Teams
- Brooklyn Robins (1918, 1927); New York Giants (1927)

Norman William Plitt (February 21, 1893 in York, Pennsylvania – February 1, 1954 in New York City) was an American pitcher in Major League Baseball. He pitched in one game for the Brooklyn Robins during the 1918 baseball season and then nine years later pitched for the Brooklyn Robins and the New York Giants in 1927.

He began his professional career with the Hanover Hornets and Chambersburg Maroons of the Blue Ridge League in 1915. Between his major league stints, he continued to play minor league baseball. His last season was in 1931 with the Elmira Colonels of the New York-Penn League. He was found dead in a dormitory at Columbia University, where his son had been attending, at age 60.
