= Chambersburg Area Senior High School =

Public high school in Pennsylvania, United States

Coordinates: 39.9290°N 77.6523°W

Chambersburg Area School District
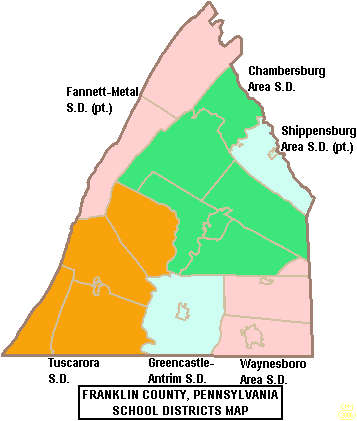
- Borough of Chambersburg, Franklin County, Pennsylvania; United States

Information
- Type: Public high school
- Established: 1955
- School district: Chambersburg Area School District
- Principal: Rodney Brenize
- Faculty: 129.59 (on FTE basis)
- Grades: 9–12
- Enrollment: 2,324 (as of 2023–2024)
- Student to teacher ratio: 17.93
- Colors: Navy Blue, White, and Silver Grey
- Mascot: Trojan
- Website: School website

Chambersburg Area Senior High School (CASHS) is a public high school located in Franklin County, Pennsylvania. The school serves grades 9, 10, 11, and 12. Students come from Chambersburg and surrounding townships of Hamilton, Greene, Lurgan, Letterkenny and Guilford.

As of the 2020–2021 school year, the school had an enrollment of 2,182 students and 118.06 classroom teachers on a FTE basis, for a student-teacher ratio of 18.48. CASHS has occupied its current facilities since 1955.

== Enrollment ==
As of the 2023-2024 academic school year, 2,324 students attended Chambersburg Area Senior High School. Of these students, there were 562 freshmen, 574 sophomores, 585 juniors, and 603 seniors. The student body was predominantly Caucasian (53.7%), and the largest minorities represented were Hispanics (29.5%) and Black Americans (8.4%). 6.6% of the school's students identified as being mixed or two or more races. 60% of the student body were economically disadvantaged.

== Extracurricular activities and Color Day ==
Chambersburg Area Senior High School offers a wide variety of extracurricular activities and an extensive sports program. In addition to a full range of sports, the school also maintains a band, an orchestra, a glee club, a student newspaper, a national honors society, a national art honors society, a variety of language clubs, a math club, a ping pong club, a ski club, an economics club, a sports club, a drama club, a camera club, a religious fellowship, a student government, a small business club, and a number of other organizations.

Chambersburg Area Senior High School is also well known for its Color Day tradition. Every year since the early 1920s, classes are suspended for a series of games and competitions between the freshmen, sophomore, junior, and senior classes. The term Color Day originated from the hues given to the different grades: gold and blue are worn by future graduates of an odd numbered year (example 2013) and red and white for the even numbered years (example 2014).

In addition to this, Chambersburg has a national-level NJROTC Program. Consistently finishing atop NJROTC Area 3, the CASHS NJROTC is well known for its Regulation and Exhibition Armed and Unarmed Drill teams. Chambersburg's NJROTC Program travels frequently for National-level Competitions.

=== Athletics ===
The 7,000-seat Trojan Stadium was overhauled in 2006 as part of a $6.5 million renovation project that included additional home seating and renovated visitors bleachers, along with a new press box. Other enhancements to the facility included artificial turf, a running track, concession stands, restrooms, ticket booths and parking lots. The Trojans called Henninger Field their home for football from 1898 until 1956, for soccer from 1968–2003 and 2005, and for baseball from the early 1900s until 2006.

The district funds:

Boys

- Baseball - AAAA
- Basketball- AAAA
- Cross Country - AAA
- Football - AAAA
- Golf - AAA
- Lacrosse - AAAA
- Soccer - AAA
- Swimming and Diving - AAA
- Tennis - AAA
- Track and Field - AAA
- Volleyball - AAA
- Wrestling - AAA

Girls

- Basketball – AAAA
- Cheerleading (sometimes coed)
- Cross Country – AAA
- Field Hockey – AAA
- Golf – AAA
- Gymnastics – AAAA
- Lacrosse – AAAA
- Soccer (Fall) – AAA
- Softball – AAA
- Swimming and Diving – AAA
- Girls' Tennis – AAA
- Track and Field – AAA
- Volleyball – AAA

On June 18, 2004, the Chambersburg Area Senior High School Trojans boys baseball team won the Pennsylvania Interscholastic Athletic Association (PIAA) Class AAA state championship, defeating Peters Township High School by 12-5, in a game played at RiverSide Stadium in Harrisburg. Coming on the heels of this state title, the baseball team was ranked 7th in the Eastern United States by USA Today in their final 2004 rankings.

The Girls' Gymnastics team was recognized as the 2005 team state champion in the State Silver Division.

Track-and-field team member Lorraine Hill had the second-longest girls high school javelin throw in the nation in 2006 with a throw of 157 feet, four inches. Hill won the 2006 Pennsylvania Interscholastic Athletic Association Class AAAA state javelin championship, won second-place finish at the Penn Relays and finished third at the Nike Team Nationals Outdoor competition in the javelin that year. Hill was named a first-team All-American by American Track & Field Magazine for her achievements in 2006.

== Notable alumni ==
- Chris Donahue (born 1969), American general who served as the commanding general of the United States Army Europe and Africa and commander of the Allied Land Command from 2024 to 2026
- Cory "Poop" Johnson (born 1992), football defensive lineman who played college football, as well as in both the NFL and the CFL
