= Arthur S. Herman =

American football player and coach (1891–1977)

Authur S. Herman
Biographical details
- Born: November 29, 1891; Gordonville, Pennsylvania, U.S.
- Died: May 1977 (aged 85); Maryland, U.S.

Playing career
- 1913–1916: Franklin & Marshall
- Positions: Halfback, punter

Coaching career (HC unless noted)
- 1917: Franklin & Marshall

Head coaching record
- Overall: 2–6

Arthur Slaymaker Herman (November 29, 1891 – May 1977) was an American football and baseball player and coach. He played college football and baseball for Franklin & Marshall College from 1913 to 1916. He also played two years of professional baseball as a second baseman for the Hanover Hornets and the Gettysburg Ponies of the Blue Ridge League. In 1969, he became one of the inaugural inductees into the Franklin & Marshall College Athletics Hall of Fame.

== Early years ==
Herman was born in Gordonville, Pennsylvania in 1891 and raised in Leacock Township, Lancaster County, Pennsylvania. He was the son of Pennsylvania natives, J. Peter Herman and Hanna F. Herman. His father was a farmer and, later, a merchant dealing in coal and lumber. He had two older brothers, Samuel S. Herman and J. Leon Herman, and a younger brother John F. Herman.

== Playing career ==
Herman was a halfback and punter for the Franklin & Marshall Nevonians (now called the "Diplomats") located in Lancaster, Pennsylvania. Herman played for the program from 1913 through the 1916 seasons. Herman first drew notice as a substitute in 1913, scoring two touchdowns in a victory over Franklin & Marshall's rival, Gettysburg College. Although Franklin & Marshall's football team today plays in the NCAA's Division III, the Nevonians played at the highest level during the 1910s. In 1914, the Franklin & Marshall football team, with Herman playing halfback, compiled a 6–2 record and defeated Penn, at the time considered one of the "Big Four" of college football, (Note: The other "Big Four" teams in the early days of college football were Princeton, Yale and Harvard. Penn has been credited with seven college football national championships between 1894 and 1924.) by a score of 10–0. In 1915, the team again compiled a 6–2 record and outscored opponents by cumulative score of 188 to 43. With Herman playing fullback, Franklin & Marshall lost to Penn by a score of 10–6 in 1915, but the Boston Globe praised the effort of the Franklin & Marshall squad: "The University of Pennsylvania football team in its third game of the season beat Franklin and Marshall today, 10 to 6, in one of the best battles seen here in years. Much praise is due the visitors from Lancaster, for during the entire game they fought with a snap and vim that at times had the Red and Blue eleven bewildered."

Herman was also a member and the captain of the varsity baseball team at Franklin & Marshall where he was "recognized as one of the best college players on the diamond." In 1916, he also played baseball for the Hanover in the Blue Ridge League. One newspaper summarized Herman's contributions while playing for Hanover as follows

Herman is one of the fastest second basemen that has ever played on Nixon Field. His fielding is as nearly perfect as can be found in teams of the Blue Ridge class, he is a strong batter, and his base running has frequently been a subject for comment. Coupled with these is his field generalship. He is constantly on the job and not a thing escapes his watchful eye ... With all Herman's scrappiness on the field his conduct has never been of the offensive sort and umpires and fans as well as members of the opposing teams have enjoyed his attention to the conduct of the game.

Upon his graduation from Franklin & Marshall in 1916, a bidding war developed for Herman's services as a professional baseball player. He ultimately signed to play professional baseball for the Gettysburg Ponies in the Blue Ridge League. He was the captain and starting second baseman for the 1916 Ponies team. He maintained a .266 batting average in 93 games and 327 at bats for Gettysburg.

== Coaching career ==
The next year, Herman was named the head football coach for his alma mater, Franklin & Marshall. He held that position for the 1917 season, compiling a record of 2–6. He left his coaching duties when called to active duty military for World War I.

Before leaving for active duty, Herman is credited with helping to sustain the football program at Franklin and Marshall during the war when many of the team's players were directed to military action.

== Later years ==
In a draft registration card completed by Herman in June 1917, Herman indicated that he was employed as the postmaster at Gordonville, which is located approximately 20 miles east of the Franklin and Marshall campus in Lancaster County, Pennsylvania. At the time of the 1920 U.S. Census, Herman was living in Baltimore, Maryland and was employed as a "steel melter" in a steel mill. He was married to Sara C. Herman. At the time of the 1930 U.S. Census, Herman was still living in Baltimore and employed as a "melter" for a steel company. He and his wife, Sara, had two children, a daughter Frances and a son Arthur S. Herman, Jr.

At the time of World War II, Herman indicated in his draft registration card that he was still living in Baltimore. He identified his employer as the Bethlehem Steel Company in Sparrows Point, Maryland. The steel produced at Bethlehem's Sparrow Point mill was used for the girders in the Golden Gate Bridge, in cables for the George Washington Bridge, in the base for the first rocket to the Moon, and was a vital part of war production during World War I and World War II.

In 1969, Herman was honored as one of the inaugural inductees into the Franklin & Marshall College Athletics Hall of Fame.

== Head coaching record ==
Year	Team	Overall	Conference	Standing	Bowl/playoffs
Franklin & Marshall (Independent) (1917)
1917	Franklin & Marshall	2–6			
Franklin & Marshall:		2–6			
Total:		2–6			
