= Hank Thormahlen =

American baseball player (1896–1955)

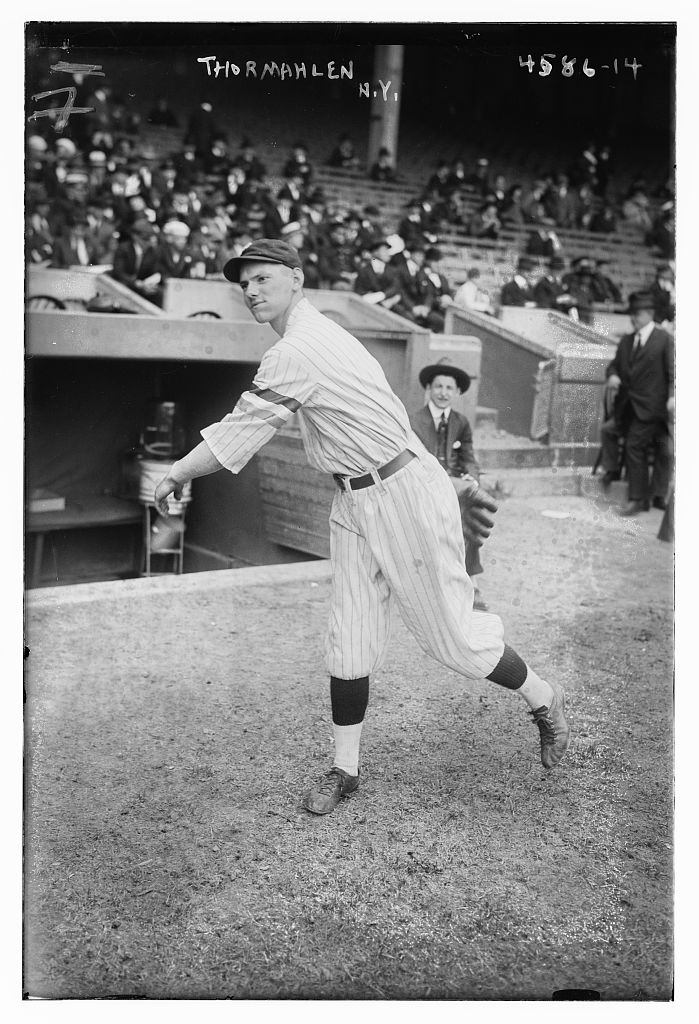
- Pitcher
- Born: July 5, 1896; Jersey City, New Jersey, U.S.
- Died: February 6, 1955 (aged 58); Los Angeles, California, U.S.
- Batted: Left Threw: Left

MLB debut
- September 29, 1917, for the New York Yankees

Last MLB appearance
- May 7, 1925, for the Brooklyn Robins

MLB statistics
- Win–loss record: 29–28
- Earned run average: 3.33
- Strikeouts: 148
- Stats at Baseball Reference

Teams
- New York Yankees (1917–1920); Boston Red Sox (1921); Brooklyn Robins (1925)

Herbert Ehler Thormahlen aka Lefty (July 5, 1896 – February 6, 1955) was an American pitcher in Major League Baseball who played from 1917 through 1925 for the New York Yankees (1917–20), Boston Red Sox (1921) and Brooklyn Robins (1925). Listed at 6 ft 0 in (1.83 m), 180 pounds (82 kg), Thormahlen batted and threw left-handed. He was born in Jersey City, New Jersey.

== Biography ==
He was born on July 5, 1896, in Jersey City, New Jersey. Thormahlen died in Los Angeles, California on February 6, 1955 at age 58. His funeral would be held in Hackensack on February 12.

== Career ==
Thormalen began his professional career with the class D Chambersburg Maroons and class AA Baltimore Orioles in 1916. When he was 21 years old, he made a one-game appearance for the New York Yankees in 1917 before returning to the minor leagues in 1918. He was once again elevated to the Yankees in 1919. Before the 1921 season Thormahlen was traded by the Yankees along with Del Pratt, Muddy Ruel and Sammy Vick to the Red Sox in exchange for Waite Hoyt, Harry Harper, Wally Schang and Mike McNally. In a six-season major league career, Thormahlen posted a 29–28 record with 148 strikeouts and a 3.33 ERA in 104 appearances, including 64 starts, 27 complete games, four shutouts, three saves, and 565 innings of work. His last game was on May 7, 1925.
