= Cory Johnson (gridiron football) =

American football player (born 1992)

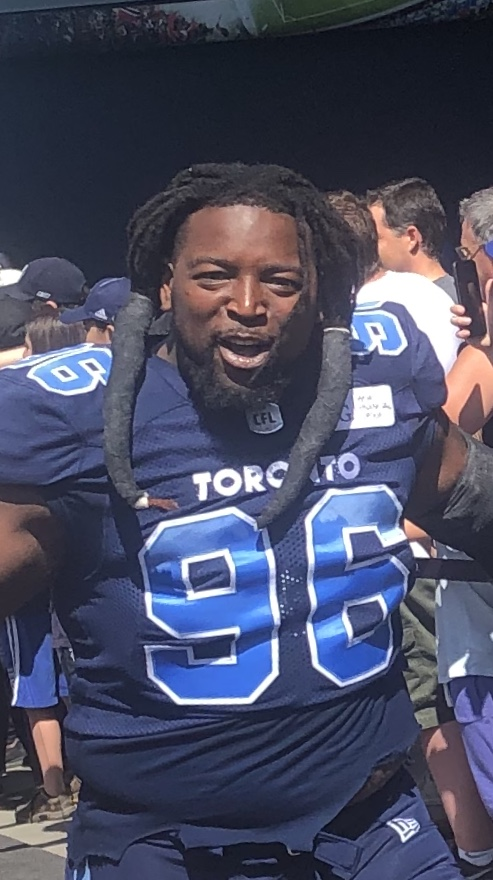
- Johnson before the Argonauts' season opener in 2019

Profile
- Position: Defensive lineman

Personal information
- Born: April 10, 1992 (age 34); Columbia, South Carolina, U.S.
- Listed height: 6 ft 3 in (1.91 m)
- Listed weight: 283 lb (128 kg)

Career information
- High school: Chambersburg (PA)
- College: Kentucky
- NFL draft: 2016: undrafted

Career history
- Atlanta Falcons (2016)*; Kansas City Chiefs (2016)*; Winnipeg Blue Bombers (2017–2018); Saskatchewan Roughriders (2018); Toronto Argonauts (2019)
- * Offseason or practice squad member only

Awards and highlights
- Second-team All-SEC (2015)

Career CFL statistics
- Tackles: 30
- Sacks: 5
- Stats at CFL.ca
- Stats at Pro Football Reference

Cory "Poop" Johnson (born April 10, 1992) is an American former professional football defensive lineman. He played college football at Kentucky. Johnson was a member of the Atlanta Falcons and Kansas City Chiefs of the National Football League (NFL), in addition to the Winnipeg Blue Bombers, Saskatchewan Roughriders, and Toronto Argonauts of the Canadian Football League (CFL).

== Early life and college career ==
Johnson moved from South Carolina to Pennsylvania during his childhood, where he attended Chambersburg Area Senior High School. He played defensive end and defensive tackle for the Chambersburg football team, also doing shot put for the track team. After initially signing with Temple, he later decided to attend ASA College, a junior college in Brooklyn, New York, where he earned multiple accolades on the football team before transferring to Kentucky. He played sporadically as a junior but became a full-time starter as a senior. During his time on the Wildcats, Johnson, listed as a defensive tackle, recorded 77 total tackles, 12 for a loss, 4.5 sacks, and had an interception and a recovered fumble, the latter of which he returned for a 77-yard touchdown.

== Professional career ==
Johnson signed as an undrafted free agent by the Atlanta Falcons following the 2016 NFL draft. He was later waived on September 2, 2016. He was signed by the Kansas City Chiefs to its practice squad in December and was later signed to a Reserve/Future contract, but was cut on May 10, 2017.

Johnson then signed with the Winnipeg Blue Bombers in May 2017. With the Blue Bombers, he saw his first professional playing time, registering 28 tackles and 5 sacks during his tenure with Winnipeg. Johnson was released by the Blue Bombers in October 2018.

On November 2, 2018, Johnson signed with the Saskatchewan Roughriders.

On February 13, 2019, Johnson signed with the Toronto Argonauts. He played in the season opener, but was released on July 10, 2019.

== Personal life ==
Johnson received his nickname during his time in Kentucky after a reporter asked him about his fluctuating weight. He quipped that it was because he "poops so much", which caught on with his teammates.

== See also ==
- List of NFL nicknames
