= Carlisle Colts =

- 1896–1904; (1896, 1904); Carlisle, Pennsylvania

Minor league affiliations
- Class: Independent (1896, 1904)
- League: Cumberland Valley League (1896); Pennsylvania League (1904)

Major league affiliations
- Team: None

Minor league titles
- League titles (0): None

Team data
- Name: Carlisle Colts (1896); Carlisle (1904)
- Ballpark: Unknown

The Carlisle Colts was the initial moniker of the minor league baseball teams based in Carlisle, Pennsylvania. The Carlisle Colts played as members of the 1896 Cumberland Valley League and Carlisle returned to minor league in 1904 as members of the Pennsylvania League.

== History ==
Carlisle, Pennsylvania first hosted minor league baseball when 1896 Carlisle Colts began play. The Colts began play as members of the four–team Independent level Cumberland Valley League. Carlisle joined the Chambersburg Maroons, Hagerstown Lions and Hanover Tigers playing in the league.

The Colts began Cumberland Valley League play on June 10, 1896. The Chambersburg Maroons folded during the season, causing the Cumberland Valley League to permanently fold on August 9, 1896. Carlisle finished in third place when the 1896 Cumberland Valley League folded. The Colts ended the season with a 14–23 record, finishing 11.5 games behind the first place Hagerstown Lions in the final league standings.

In 1904, the Carlisle team resumed minor league play as members of the Independent level Pennsylvania League.

The 1904 Pennsylvania League was a six–team league. Joining Carlisle in the Pennsylvania League were the teams based in Coatesville, Chester, Johnstown, Pennsylvania (Johnstown Johnnies), Oxford, Pennsylvania and Pottstown, Pennsylvania. While rosters exist, the team records and statistics of the 1904 Pennsylvania League are unknown.

The Pennsylvania League permanently folded after the 1904 season and Carlisle, Pennsylvania has not hosted another minor league team.

== The ballpark ==
The exact name and location of the Carlisle home minor league ballpark is unknown. Facilities at Dickinson College, founded in 1783, were in use in the era.

== Timeline ==
Year(s)	# Yrs.	Team	Level	League
1896	1	Carlisle Colts	Independent	Cumberland Valley League
1904	1	Carlisle	Independent	Pennsylvania League

== Year-by-year records ==
Year	Record	Finish	Manager	Playoffs/Notes
1896	14–23	3rd	Unknown	League folded August 9
1904	00–00	NA	Unknown	League records and standings unknown

== Notable alumni ==
- Ernie Beam (1896)
- Wid Conroy (1896)
- Jack Egan (1896)
- Danny Green (1896)
- Frank Jude (1904)
- Harry Wilhelm (1896)
- Zeke Wrigley (1896)

== See also ==
- Carlisle Colts players
- Carlisle (minor league baseball) players
