= Joe Cambria =

American baseball scout and executive

- Born: Carlo Cambria; July 5, 1890; Messina, Italy
- Died: September 24, 1962 (aged 72); Minneapolis, Minnesota, US
- Other names: Joseph Carl Cambria
- Occupations: Baseball scout Executive in Minor League Baseball; Executive in Negro league baseball Minor League Baseball outfielder

Joseph Carl Cambria, also known as "Papa Joe," (born Carlo Cambria; July 5, 1890 – September 24, 1962) was an American professional baseball scout and executive who was a pioneer in recruiting Latin American players. From 1929 through 1940, he owned several Minor League Baseball teams, as well as the Negro league Baltimore Black Sox. He is best known, however, for his work as a scout for Major League Baseball, especially for his work in Cuba. From the mid-1930s until his death in 1962, he recruited hundreds of Cuban players for the Washington Senators and Minnesota Twins. Cambria was described as "the first of many scouts who searched Latin America for inexpensive recruits for their respective ball clubs."

== Early life ==
Cambria was born in Messina, Italy on July 5, 1890. In 1893 he and his two older brothers were brought to the United States by his father; his mother did not make the trip and may have died in Italy. They settled in Boston, where Cambria attended public schools. He played professional baseball as an outfielder for the Newport team of the independent Rhode Island League in 1909–1910 and for the minor league Berlin Green Sox of the Canadian League in 1911–12. His career as a baseball player ended after he broke his leg, and he returned to Massachusetts, worked in Boston and Lowell, and married Charlotte Kane. He became a naturalized U.S. citizen in 1916 and served in the military during World War I.

== Baltimore ==
After his military service, Cambria moved to Baltimore where he eventually owned a laundry business, the Bugle Coat and Apron Company. In 1928, his company sponsored an amateur baseball team known as the Bugles and the following year he converted it to a semi-professional team. He purchased and renovated a ballpark, which he renamed Bugle Field, for the team. In December 1929, he purchased a minor league team, the Hagerstown Hubs of the Blue Ridge League. In 1931, the team moved to the Middle Atlantic League and, in mid-season, moved first to Parkersburg, West Virginia, then to Youngstown, Ohio. In 1932, the team played as the Youngstown Buckeyes in the Central League, after which he sold the team.

In 1932, Cambria became co-owner (with George Rossiter) and general manager of the Baltimore Black Sox, a Negro league team. He renovated and expanded Bugle Field, adding lighting equipment for night games, and made it the home park for the Black Sox. The team was in first place in the East-West League in late June when the league disbanded and the teams stopped paying player salaries, instead splitting a percentage of the gate receipts with the players. In 1933 the Black Sox played in the new Negro National League. Cambria's team faced competition from two other Baltimore-based Negro league teams—Ben Taylor headed the Baltimore Stars, and J. B. Hairstone headed an independent team called the "Black Sox" that obtained an injunction forcing Cambria to temporarily rename his team as the "Sox." In 1934, Cambria applied to reenter the Negro National League, but when several star players announced they would leave the team his application was rejected, and he disbanded the team.

In 1933, Cambria purchased the Albany Senators of the International League. He sold many players to major league clubs, and established a close working relationship with Clark Griffith, owner of the Washington Senators. In 1934 he signed Cuban Bobby Estalella, the first of many Cuban players he would scout and recruit. In 1936 he sold the Albany Senators to the New York Giants, who moved the franchise to Jersey City, New Jersey.

From 1937 through 1940, Cambria also owned the Salisbury Indians of the Eastern Shore League. Their 1937 season featured one of the most remarkable comebacks in the history of baseball. After opening the season with a 21–5 record, the league president ruled that the team had carried one more "experienced" player than the four experienced players allowed by the league rules, and declared all of their victories to be forfeits, resetting their record to 0–26. The fifth experienced player had signed a minor league contract three years earlier, but had never actually played professionally. Cambria appealed the decision to the president of the National Association of Professional Baseball Leagues, but to no avail. But the team continued to play very well and eventually retook the lead, going 59–11 over the remainder of the season. The best pitcher, Joe Kohlman, pitched a no-hitter to clinch the pennant and a second no-hitter two weeks later to win the deciding game of the league playoffs.

Cambria invested in other minor league teams. In 1935 he bought the Harrisburg Senators of the New York–Pennsylvania League. After one season, the ballpark was flooded and he moved the team first to York, Pennsylvania, then to Trenton, New Jersey halfway through the 1936 season. In 1938 the New York–Pennsylvania League was renamed as the Eastern League, and in 1939 the Trenton Senators moved to Springfield, Massachusetts as the Springfield Nationals. In 1938 he owned the St. Augustine Saints of the Florida State League, from 1939 to 1940 he owned the Greenville Spinners of the South Atlantic League, and in 1940 he owned the Newport Canners of the Appalachian League. After the 1940 season, Landis ruled that a major league scout could not own a minor league team, so Cambria sold his minor league interests to work as a full-time scout for the Washington Senators.

== Cuba ==
Cambria made his first trip to Cuba in the spring of 1936 and signed nine Cuban players for the Albany Senators. After the early 1940s, Cambria usually resided in Havana most of the year. He signed many other Cuban players who eventually made it to the major leagues, including Sandy Consuegra, Bobby Estalella, Willy Miranda, Mike Fornieles, Connie Marrero, Tony Oliva, Camilo Pascual, Pedro Ramos, and Zoilo Versalles. He also signed players from other Latin American countries, including Alex Carrasquel, the first player from Venezuela. Cambria developed a system of "bird dog" scouts, including Merito Acosta, who would scout the provinces for young baseball players who had not yet made their way to Havana. He also invested in the neighborhood around Gran Stadium, buying bars, rental properties, and a small restaurant behind the center-field scoreboard.

In 1946, Cambria was one of three investors who owned the Havana Cubans, a franchise in the new minor league Florida International League. Griffith soon purchased a 50-percent interest and turned the Cubans into a Senators farm team. The attendance during the team's first season, 197,389, was nearly double the old attendance record for a Class C minor league team. During each of its first five seasons, the team had the best record in the Florida International League, though it won the playoffs only twice, in 1947 and 1948.

When the Senators relocated to Minnesota in 1961 and became the Minnesota Twins, Cambria remained with the team. In March 1962, Cambria became very ill and was flown from Havana to Minneapolis for treatment. He died at St. Barnabas Hospital in Minneapolis on September 24, 1962.
