= Henninger Field =

Ballpark in Chambersburg, Pennsylvania, US

- Home of the Chambersburg Maroons
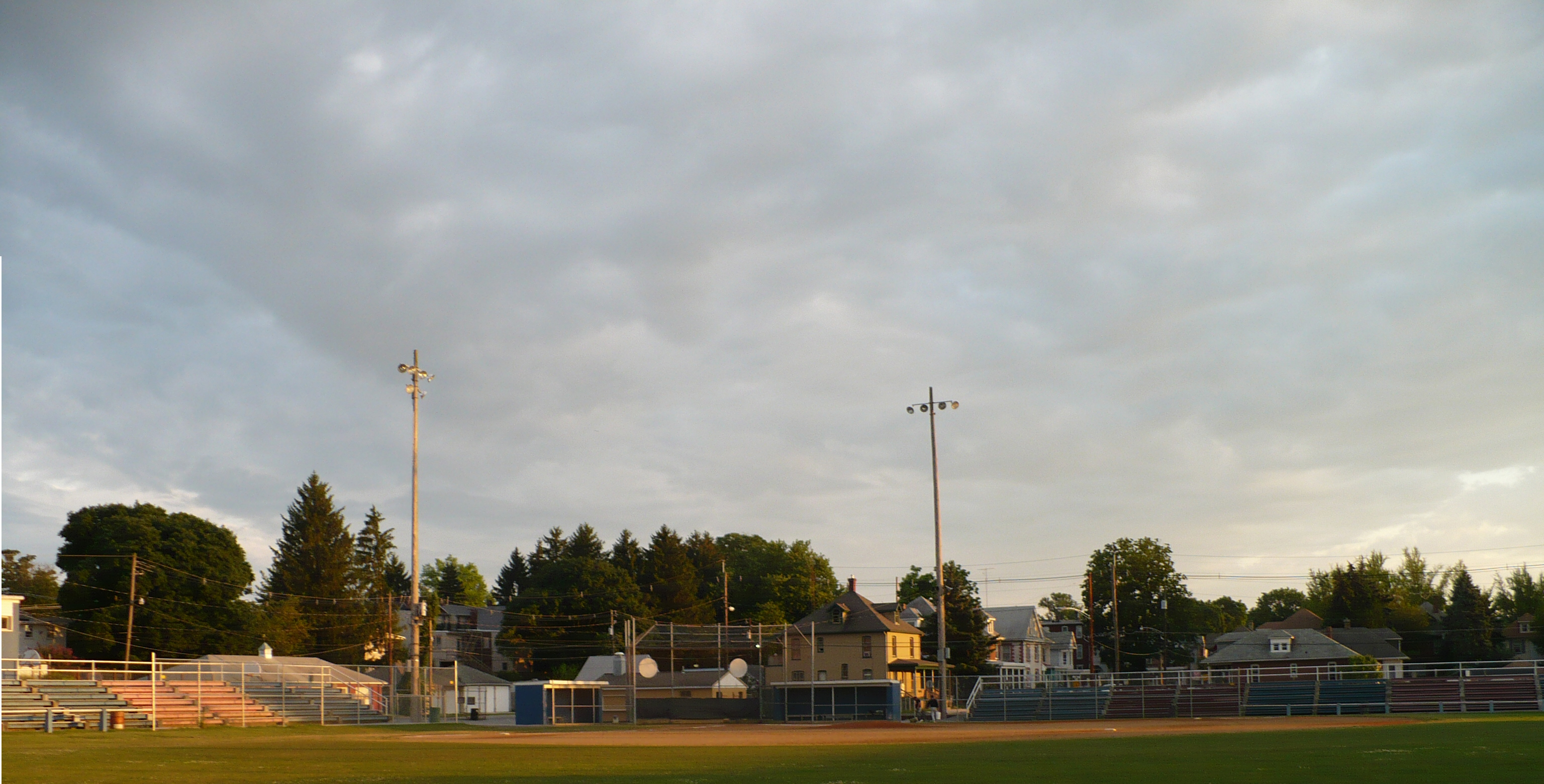
- Interactive map of Henninger Field
- Former names: Wolf Park or Wolf Field (1895–1920)
- Location: Corner of Vine Street and Riddle Alley, Chambersburg, PA 17201
- Coordinates: 39°56′43.67″N 77°39′26.41″W
- Owner: Borough of Chambersburg
- Operator: Chambersburg Maroons
- Surface: Natural Grass
- Field size: Left Field - 305; Center Field - 455; Right Field - 375

Construction
- Opened: 1895
- Cost: Unknown

Tenants
- Chambersburg Maroons - 1895–2010; Chambersburg Trojans football 1898–1956; Chambersburg Young Yanks 1929–1930; Chambersburg Trojans baseball 1900–2006; Chambersburg Cardinals (MDFL) - 1946–1955; Chambersburg Trojans soccer 1968–2003, 2005; Wilson Phoenix baseball 2018–present

Henninger Field is a historic ballpark located in historic Chambersburg, Pennsylvania.

Erected in 1895, Henninger Field, (originally known as Wolf Park), is the home of the Chambersburg Maroons. Wolf Park was renamed in 1920 in honor of Clay Henninger, a very influential person in baseball in Chambersburg.

The field, owned by the Borough of Chambersburg, is leased currently to Wilson College, a local four-year liberal arts school, as the home field for their Men's NCAA Division III baseball program.

== Major League Memorial ==
Major League Baseball third baseman Mike Mowrey was born in Chambersburg and managed and played baseball for the Chambersburg Maroons at Henninger Field for several seasons prior to his days in the Major Leagues. Mowrey had his memorial service held at Henninger Field. Two months after his death on March 20, 1947, Mowrey's memorial service was held following a game played by the sandlot Letterkenny team. More than 1,000 people attended the service, and according to the eulogy, "He was our Grand Old Man of Baseball, who started as a sandlotter and went to the top in baseball to become one of the greatest third basemen the game had known."

== Other Users ==
Henninger Field has been a cornerstone of athletics in the Greater Chambersburg area since the nineteenth century. Aside from the Maroons, Henninger has hosted sporting events ranging from another Minor League Baseball team, the Chambersburg Young Yanks (1929–1930), to the Chambersburg Cardinals of the Mason Dixon Football League (1946–1955). Chambersburg Trojans athletics have also been present, with events ranging from baseball (1900–2006), football (1898–1956), and soccer (1968–2003, 2005) being played at the site as well. In 2018, the Wilson College Phoenix baseball team will play their home games here, 2018 is the first year for the program.

== Babe Ruth and Henninger Field ==
Babe Ruth and the 1929 New York Yankees played an exhibition game at Henninger Field against the Chambersburg Maroons in the summer of 1929. Ruth hit a home run to left-center field during the game.

== Location ==
This historic ballpark is located at the corner of Vine Street and Riddle Alley in downtown Chambersburg.

== Dimensions ==
- Leftfield (305)
- Centerfield (455)
- Right field (375)
