= Billy Goeckel =

American baseball player (1871–1922)

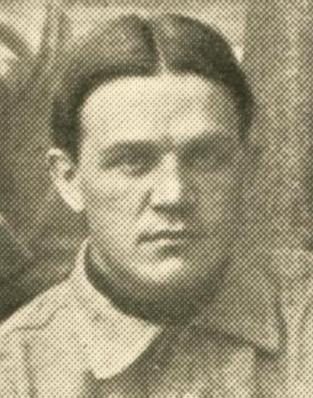
- First baseman
- Born: September 3, 1871; Wilkes-Barre, Pennsylvania, U.S.
- Died: November 1, 1922 (aged 51); Philadelphia, Pennsylvania, U.S.
- Batted: Right Threw: Left

MLB debut
- August 10, 1899, for the Philadelphia Phillies

Last MLB appearance
- September 21, 1899, for the Philadelphia Phillies

MLB statistics
- Batting average: .262
- Home runs: 0
- Runs batted in: 16
- Stats at Baseball Reference

Teams
- Philadelphia Phillies (1899)

William John Goeckel (September 3, 1871 – November 1, 1922) was an American professional baseball player who played first base for the 1899 Philadelphia Phillies.

== Biography ==
Goeckel attended Canisius College and the University of Pennsylvania (Penn).

When Goeckel played on Penn's varsity baseball team in 1893, 1894 and 1895, he was considered the finest collegiate first baseman of his day. At Penn Goeckel was also known as a musician and composer. He was most famous for writing the melody for "The Red and Blue", which is considered one of the greatest field songs, and has since been the University's theme song. While at Penn he also composed "Memories" and the "Houston Club March." A tenor, he was also a member and leader of Penn's Glee Club.

After his graduation from law school in 1896, began his professional baseball career with the Chambersburg Maroons of the Cumberland Valley League. Goeckel then returned to Wilkes-Barre where he served as both player on and manager of the Wilkes-Barre Eastern League team. His best minor league season was in 1896 when he had a batting average of .330 in 491 at bats for Wilkes-Barre. Goeckel played one season in the major leagues, debuting on August 10, 1899, with the Philadelphia Phillies; his last game was September 21 of that year.

Goeckel retired completely from baseball after the 1899 season to practice law in Wilkes-Barre. He later became the organizer and attorney for the South Side Bank and Trust Company as well as chairman of Wilkes-Barre's Democratic City Committee. He continued his interest in music as organist and conductor of the St. Nicholas male choir and as president of the Concordia Singing Society.

== Death ==
Goeckel died November 1, 1922, in Philadelphia, although his residence was still in Wilkes-Barre.
