= Babe Phelps =

American baseball player (1908–1992)

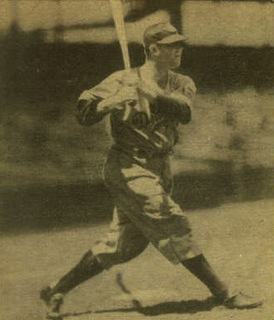
- Catcher
- Born: April 16, 1908; Odenton, Maryland, U.S.
- Died: December 10, 1992 (aged 84); Odenton, Maryland, U.S.
- Batted: Left Threw: Right

MLB debut
- September 17, 1931, for the Washington Senators

Last MLB appearance
- September 27, 1942, for the Pittsburgh Pirates

MLB statistics
- Batting average: .310
- Home runs: 54
- Runs batted in: 345
- Stats at Baseball Reference

Teams
- Washington Senators (1931); Chicago Cubs (1933–1934); Brooklyn Dodgers (1935–1941); Pittsburgh Pirates (1942)

Career highlights and awards
- 3× All-Star (1938–1940)

Ernest Gordon Phelps (April 19, 1908 – December 10, 1992) born in Odenton, Maryland, United States was a catcher for the Washington Senators (1931), Chicago Cubs (1933–34), Brooklyn Dodgers (1935–41) and Pittsburgh Pirates (1942). His .367 batting average in 1936 remains the highest for any catcher in the modern era (1901–present).

He began his professional career with the Hagerstown Hubs of the Blue Ridge League in 1930. He set several all-time seasonal marks for the Blue Ridge League that year: at bats (466), hits (175), extra base hits (62) and total bases (300). He appeared briefly (3 games) at the major league level for the Washington Senators in 1931, but he did not stay permanently until he began playing with the Chicago Cubs in 1933.

He played 726 major league games in 11 seasons, batting .310 (657-for-2117) including 19 triples and 54 home runs, 345 RBI, a .362 on-base percentage, and a .472 slugging percentage. Phelps was named to the National League All-Star Team from 1938 to 1940, and helped the Dodgers win the 1941 National League pennant. He died in his hometown at the age of 84.

== Sources ==
- Career statistics from Baseball Reference, or Baseball Reference (Minors)
