= Earl Howard (baseball) =

American baseball player (1896–1937)

- Pitcher
- Born: June 25, 1896; Everett, Pennsylvania, U.S.
- Died: April 4, 1937 (aged 40); Everett, Pennsylvania, U.S.
- Batted: Right Threw: Right

MLB debut
- April 18, 1918, for the St. Louis Cardinals

Last MLB appearance
- April 18, 1918, for the St. Louis Cardinals

MLB statistics
- Games pitched: 1
- Innings pitched: 2.0
- Batters faced: 7
- Stats at Baseball Reference

Teams
- St. Louis Cardinals (1918)

Earl Nycum Howard (June 25, 1896 – April 4, 1937) was an American Major League Baseball pitcher. Howard played in one game for the St. Louis Cardinals on April 18, 1918.

He began his professional career with the Gettysburg Patriots of the Blue Ridge League in 1915. Undoubtedly his best season in the minor leagues came during the 1917 season with the Hagerstown Terriers, also of the Blue Ridge League. He pitched 266 innings while accumulating a record of 25 wins and 10 losses. He accumulated 166 strikeouts, 8 shutouts, and an earned run average of 1.39, all season highs for the 1917 Blue Ridge League. His 25 wins tied the all-time seasonal mark for the Blue Ridge League. His pitching was a key component to Hagerstown's capture of the league title that year.

After his one-game appearance in the majors, the collapse of the Blue Ridge League in 1918 force Howard to move to Milwaukee to play baseball. He played in Milwaukee for parts of four seasons. His spent the last two seasons of his professional career with the Newark Bears of the International League in 1927 and 1928.
