= Hagerstown Hubs =

- 1924–1931; (1915–1932); Hagerstown, Maryland

Minor league affiliations
- Previous classes: Class B (1932); Class C (1931); Class D (1915–1930)
- Previous leagues: Central League (1932); Middle Atlantic League (1931); Blue Ridge League (1915–1930)

Major league affiliations
- Previous teams: Washington Senators (1930–1931)

Minor league titles
- League titles: 1917, 1920, 1925, 1926, 1929

Team data
- Previous names: Youngstown Buckeyes 1932; Youngstown Tubers 1931; Parkersburg Parkers 1931; Hagerstown Hubs (1924–1931); Hagertown Terriers (1916–1918) (1922–1923); Hagerstown Champs (1920–1921); Hagerstown Blues (1915)
- Previous parks: Idora Park (1931–1932); Municipal Stadium (1930–1931); Willow Lane Park (1915–1929)

The Hagerstown Hubs were a Minor League Baseball team based in Hagerstown, Maryland, United States. The team played predominantly in the Blue Ridge League (1915–1930) and briefly in the Middle Atlantic League (1931). Their home games were in Willow Lane Park from 1915 to 1929 and Municipal Stadium during the 1930 and 1931 seasons.

== History ==
A semiprofessional league, the Tri-City League, had teams in Hagerstown, Frederick and Martinsburg in 1914. In 1915, the Tri-City League organizers added the cities of Chambersburg, Hanover and Gettysburg and petitioned the National Association of Professional Baseball Leagues, the governing body of Minor League Baseball, for permission to establish a class D (lowest level) professional league, the Blue Ridge League.

=== 1915: The Blues begin play ===
The Hagerstown Blues were owned by Charles W. Boyer. Boyer was previously the president of the South Atlantic League but had resigned to pursue his business interests in Hagerstown. Boyer owned a string of theater houses in the region which gave him an understanding of how to provide a comfortable, inviting experience for his patrons. When the Blue Ridge league formed, Boyer not only owned the Hagerstown entry, but became president of the Blue Ridge League as well. However, Hagerstown almost did not have a team in 1915 because of the lack of a playing field. Local businessman Henry E. Bester offered land near downtown for construction of a facility (the site is where Bester Elementary School is now located). Once play began Monk Walter posted a .269 batting average while leading the team with 74 hits. Former major leaguer Buck Hooker had a .280 batting average. The leader in innings pitched for the year 1915 was Jake Heavener with 117. Probably the most notable performance of 1915 came from pitcher Abe Welcher. He posted a perfect 8-0 record and set the Blue Ridge League winning streak. Welcher was named to the 1915 Blue Ridge League End of Season All Star Team. The Blues finished fourth in the six team league with a 34-42-2 record.

=== 1916–1918: Hagerstown Terriers ===
The team was renamed the Terriers for the next three seasons. Charles Dysert had a batting average of .271 and scored a league leading 71 runs for Hagerstown. The pitching staff was led by Chalkey McCleary, who led the Blue Ridge League with a .667 winning percentage. On June 28, Wick Winslow threw a no-hitter against the Chambersburg Maroons, with Hagerstown winning by a 4-0 score. Winslow's name was actually Walter Warwick; however, he changed his name to skirt the league's limit on players with higher level experience. Later in the season on August 25, Earl Howard threw a no-hitter against the Gettysburg Ponies, winning by an identical 4-0 score. Overall, the team also enjoyed its first winning record. Off the field, significant management changes occurred. Boyer resigned as president of the Blue Ridge League to alleviate the concerns of other owners over favoritism. He was replaced as president of the Blue Ridge League by James Vincent Jamison, Jr., who served as president throughout the rest of the league's tenure. On August 15, 1916, Boyer sold his interest in the Hagerstown club to a group headed by Colonel J. C. Roulette.

1917 proved to be a good year for the Terriers. The team had a 61-36 record, winning their first Blue Ridge League championship. Jack Hurley led the entire Blue Ridge League with a .385 batting average and 125 hits. In this dead-ball era, no player hit more than one home run during the season. The pitching staff was led by Earl Howard. Howard's 25 wins set a league mark, and his .714 winning percentage was a high for league in 1917, as was his 163 strikeouts.

World War I took its toll on the Terriers and the Blue Ridge League in 1918. The league disbanded on June 16. H.L. Hickey led the league in runs scored with 15 and Vic Keen led the league in strikeouts with 33 during the truncated season. Late in 1918, Colonel J.C. Roulette died during the worldwide influenza pandemic. The aftermath of the war and pandemic meant that the Blue Ridge League was incapable of operating during 1919.

=== 1920–1921: The Hagerstown Champs years ===
The Blue Ridge League returned in 1920. The Hagerstown team returned with a new name, the Champs. The team also had a new leader, Richard Hartle, who took over as club president for the 1920 season and turned a $6,000 profit for the season. Activities on the field were just as profitable as Hagerstown won its second Blue Ridge League title. Two dominant pitchers led the way: Charles Dye and Alan Clarke. Dye led the league in wins (18) and winning percentage (.720), while Clarke led the league in strikeouts (150). Player-manager and former major leaguer Mike Mowrey had a .333 batting average in 77 games. The power was provided by Tom Day, who hit 11 home runs. On May 21, Hall of Fame pitcher Lefty Grove of Martinsburg made his minor league debut against the visiting Hagerstown team, losing 4-2. On June 11, Grove won his first minor league game, also against Hagerstown.

The Champs did not live up to their nickname in 1921, finishing last in the Blue Ridge League standings. The Hagerstown teams would finish last in the next two years as well. The only player with more than 100 hits in 1921 was John Layne, who had a .302 batting average in 95 games. Wagner led the team with 11 home runs. Earl Berry led the team with 15 wins and 232.2 innings pitched.

=== 1922–1923: The Terriers again ===
D. Lee Staley became the president of the club in 1922. The team returned to its previous Terrier nickname, but its fortunes did not change. The team finished 26 games behind the first place team Martinsburg Blue Sox. Tom Day had a .299 batting average in 90 games and 301 at bats for the team. Holmes Diehl led the team in home runs with 7. Ewing Mahan was the best pitcher with a 10-14 record in 183 innings pitched.

The Terriers won 11 more games in 1923 as compared to 1922, but it did nothing to improve their place in the standings. The Terriers finished even further behind (27 games) the champion Blue Sox, whose exploits were powered by George Rawlings and future Hall of Fame member Hack Wilson. Larry Steinbach led the Terriers with a .332 batting average and 6 home runs. Holmes Diehl returned with a noteworthy season of 6 home runs and a .323 batting average. Billy Russell led all Terriers with 8 home runs.

=== 1924–1931: The Hagerstown Hubs ===
1924 was a turnaround year for the newly named Hagerstown Hubs. The team finished with a 60-39 record, in a tie with the Blue Sox. However, the Blue Sox's 59-38 record resulted in a slightly higher winning percentage (.608) as compared to Hagerstown's .606 percentage, so Martinsburg was declared the league champion. Strickler hit 12 home runs and had a .347 batting average, while George Thomas hit 12 home runs with a .348 batting average. Brown led the staff with 14 wins.

Hagerstown returned to championship form in 1925. Pitcher Joe Zubris tied for the league lead with 20 wins. His 163 strikeouts also led the league. Other league leaders included George Scheiminant (runs scored, 93) and George Thomas (home runs, 19). As the Blue Ridge League champion, the Hubs had the opportunity to play the champion of the class D Eastern Shore League in the Five State championship, so called because there were teams from Maryland, Delaware, Pennsylvania, West Virginia and Virginia (the Blue Ridge League having teams from Pennsylvania, Maryland and West Virginia, while the opposing Eastern Shore League had teams from Maryland, Delaware and Virginia). The Five State championship was the idea of C. Edward Spearow, who was the sports editor of the Baltimore Sun. Negotiations began in 1921 with the first series being played in 1922. Hagerstown played the Eastern Shore League champion Cambridge Canners in the 1925 series. The Hubs won the tightly contested series 4 games to 3. The Five State Championship generated a great deal of much needed revenue for both leagues.

Pitching carried Hagerstown to high levels again in 1926. Harry Fishbaugh topped the league with 17 wins. Phil Dolan's .833 winning percentage placed him at the top of the league list as well. One of the few blemishes in the season was a no-hitter thrown against Hagerstown by Chuck Warden of Waynesboro on August 3, with Waynesboro winning 3-0. In order to encourage attendance, the Blue Ridge League switched to a split season format in 1926, where the winner of the first half of the season would play the winner of the second half of the season. The Hubs almost became a spoiler to this format. The Hubs won the first half of the season with an impressive 38-13 record. The Hubs narrowly missed winning the second half as well, finishing only 0.5 games behind second half winner Frederick. In the inaugural Blue Ridge League championship series, the Hubs defeated the Frederick Hustlers 3 games to 1. Hagerstown returned to the Five State championship to play the champion of the Eastern Shore League, the Crisfield Crabbers. Once again, the Hubs were triumphant in the inter-league series, winning 4 games to 2.

The Hubs could not sustain the performance of the previous two seasons and fell to last place in the league in 1927. George Kline and Harry Fisher were the team leaders in wins with only 7 wins each. Fisher was also the team leader with 23 games pitched.

In 1928, Raynor Lehr, leader of a successful vaudeville and acting troupe, purchased the Hagerstown franchise and assumed its $3,000 debt. The team also had three different managers during this season: George Purtell, Lester Bangs and Joel Shelton. George Thomas led the league with 13 home runs. He also had a .341 batting average. The Hubs were only marginally better in 1928, finishing 5th in both halves of the season.

In 1929, the team was again sold, this time to Baltimore businessman (and later major league baseball scout) Joe Cambria for $2,500. Cambria was a shrewd businessman. One of the innovations introduced by Cambria was night baseball, five years before major league baseball did the same. The first night game turned out between 2,500 and 3,000 fans. While other teams lost between $18,000 and $30,000, Cambria lost only $4,000 in 1929. On the field, Frank Wertman was impressive as he struck out 167 batters to lead the league. 1929 was also the year that Reggie Rawlings played for Hagerstown. Rawlings had played 1,500 games for the Blue Ridge League and he was consistently among the league leaders in hits, home runs and batting average. Playing for the Hubs in his last season at the age of 39, he had a .321 batting average with 11 home runs. Under Mickey Keliher, the Hubs won the first half season. The Hubs slipped badly in the second half, finishing in last place. Hagerstown recovered in the Blue Ridge League championship series, winning 4 games to 2 over Martinsburg. The Eastern Shore League had folded in 1928. However, in August of that year and agreement was struck with the class C Middle Atlantic League for a post-season inter-league series called the Tri-State Series. The Middle Atlantic League champion Charleroi Governors defeated the Hubs 4 games to 1.

In 1930, the Hagerstown School Board exercised an option to build a school on the site of Willow Lane Park. Officials scurried to find a new site and came up with a new location nearby. A remarkable public fundraising campaign ensued, and Municipal Stadium was built in a short period of six weeks. Municipal Stadium still stands today as the home field of the Hagerstown Suns. Even with the new stadium, Hagerstown failed to qualify for the playoffs in 1930, finishing last in the first half and second in the second half. Babe Phelps dominated the offensive categories not only for the Hubs, but for the entire league as well. He set or tied the Blue Ridge League season records for at bats (466), hits (175) and extra base hits (62) while posting an equally impressive .376 batting average.

On February 9, 1931, the Blue Ridge League was dissolved because of financial problems. Cambria was able to affiliate the Hubs with the class C Middle Atlantic League. In this league were the Cumberland Colts, who had previously participated in the Blue Ridge League, as well as the Charleroi Governors who had played Hagerstown in the 1929 Tri-State series. The Hubs' days in Hagerstown were numbered. After posting a record of 27-22, Cambria moved the team to Parkersburg, West Virginia on June 28, becoming the Parkersburg Parkers. While in Parkersburg, the team posted a record of 9-5 before moving once again on July 12 to Youngstown, Ohio to become the Youngstown Tubers. Despite the change in location and classification, Babe Phelps had another spectacular season, leading the 1932 Middle Atlantic League with a batting average of .408 and 178 hits. Later in the year he made his debut with the Washington Senators.

== Legacy ==
The Hubs team name lives in the North Hagerstown High School athletic teams. North Hagerstown High School has existed since 1956.

Municipal Stadium became the home field of the Hagerstown Owls when Oren Sterling relocated his Sunbury Indians to Hagerstown in 1941. This team played in the Inter-State League and Piedmont League through the 1955 season. In 1981, Lou Eliopulos purchased the Rocky Mount Pines team and moved them to Hagerstown to become the Hagerstown Suns. Municipal Stadium is still the Suns home field.

The Middle Atlantic League suspended operations after the 1931 season. The Youngstown Tubers moved to the class B Central League for the 1932 season and became the Youngstown Buckeyes. Babe Phelps led the Central League during the 1932 season in the categories of batting average (.372), hits (199) and home runs (26). The Central League also suspended operations after the 1932 season, along with the Youngstown team.

== Major league alumni ==
Hagerstown players from this era who were major leaguers are listed below. A player in bold was a Major League Baseball All-Star.

- Walt Herrell: 1915, 1916, 1921
- Buck Hooker: 1915
- Earl Howard: 1916, 1917
- Paul Speraw: 1916
- Bert Weeden: 1916
- John Allen: 1917
- Hanson Horsey: 1917
- Earle Mack: 1917
- Leo Meyer: 1917
- Mike Mowrey: 1917, 1920, 1921
- Vic Keen: 1918
- Tommy Vereker: 1920, 1921, 1922
- Ray Gardner: 1921
- Joe Gleason: 1923
- John Perrin: 1927
- Billy Purtell: 1928
- Mickey Keliher: 1929
- Mike Meola:1929, 1930
- Frankie Pytlak:1929
- Merwin Jacobson: 1930
- Jake Miller: 1930
- Babe Phelps: 1930, 1931
- Tommy Thompson: 1930, 1931
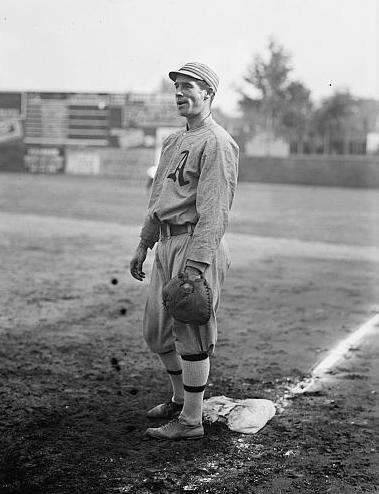
Earle Mack

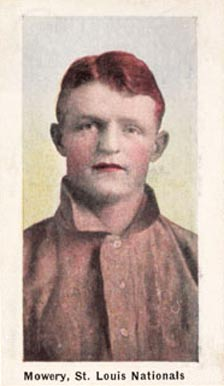
Mike Mowrey

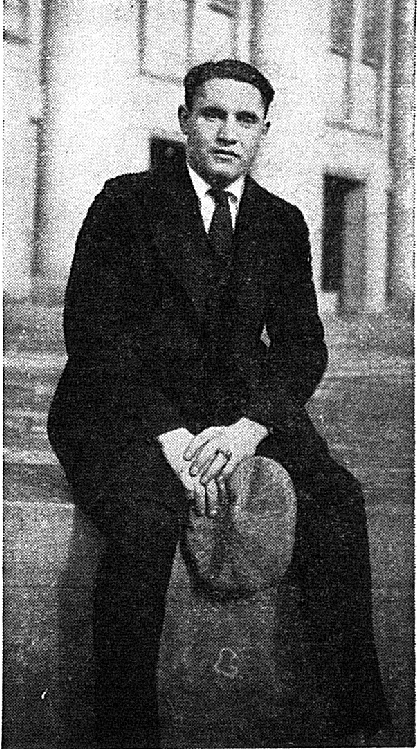
John Perrin

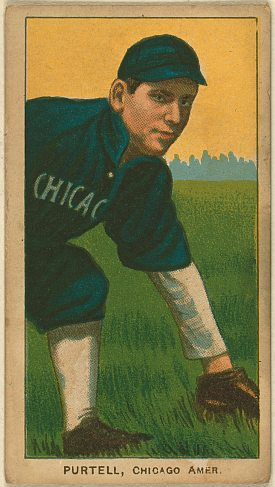
Billy Purtell

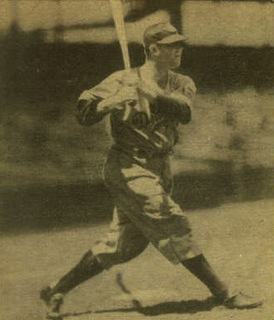
Babe Phelps

== Blue Ridge League records ==
Hagerstown holds several Blue Ridge League individual season records.

- At bats: 466, Babe Phelps (1930)
- Hits: 175, Babe Phelps (1930)
- Doubles: 41, Holmes Diehl (1925)
- Extra base hits: 62, Babe Phelps (1930) (tied with one other)
- Total bases: 300, Babe Phelps (1930)
- Sacrifices: 39, John Boyle (1925)
- Walks (batter): 100, George Scheiminant (1925)
- Wins: 25, Earl Howard (1925) (tied with one other)
- Winning streak: 8, Abe Welcher (1915)
- Walks allowed: 163, Joe Zubris (1925)

== Team season-by-season records ==
Hagerstown Season by Season Records
Season	Nickname	Class	League	Record	Finish	Games Behind	Manager(s)	Postseason
1915	Blues	D	Blue Ridge	24-42	4th	10	John Laughlin; Gene Hanks	None
1916	Terriers	D	Blue Ridge	49-46	3rd	5	Bert Weeden	None
1917	Terriers	D	Blue Ridge	61-36	1st	–	John Hurley; Charles Dysert	None (League Champions)
1918	Terriers	D	Blue Ridge	7-10	3rd	3.5	Ernest "Doc" Ferris	None
1920	Champs	D	Blue Ridge	56-40	1st	–	Mike Mowrey	None (League Champions)
1921	Champs	D	Blue Ridge	30-58	6th	24	Mike Mowrey	None
1922	Terriers	D	Blue Ridge	30-66	6th	26	Mike Corcoran; Tony Walsh	None
1923	Terriers	D	Blue Ridge	41-58	6th	27	Tony Walsh; Larry Steinbach	None
1924	Hubs	D	Blue Ridge	60-39	2nd	–	"Bugs" Snyder	None
1925	Hubs	D	Blue Ridge	65-35	1st	–	Ray Werre	League Champions; Defeated Cambridge 3-1 in Five State Championship
1926	Hubs	D	Blue Ridge	38-13 (1st Half); 26-18 (2nd Half)	1st (1st Half); 2nd (2nd Half)	– (1st Half); 0.5 (2nd Half)	Dave Black	Defeated Frederick 3-1 in Blue League championship Defeated Crisfield 4-2 in Five State Championship
1927	Hubs	D	Blue Ridge	17-33 (1st Half); 15-35 (2nd Half)	6th (1st Half); 6th (2nd Half)	15 (1st Half); 19 (2nd Half)	George Thomas; Al Kreuz	Did not qualify
1928	Hubs	D	Blue Ridge	21-26 (1st Half); 22-26 (2nd Half)	5th (1st Half); 5th (2nd Half)	9 (1st Half); 9.5 (2nd Half)	George Purtell; Lester Bangs; Joel Shelton	Did not qualify
1929	Hubs	D	Blue Ridge	36-22 (1st Half); 24-33 (2nd Half)	1st (1st Half); 6th (2nd Half)	– (1st Half); 13 (2nd Half)	Mickey Keliher	Defeated Martinsburg 4-2 in Blue Ridge League championship Lost to Charleroi 4-1 in Tri-State Championship
1930	Hubs	D	Blue Ridge	25-33 (1st Half); 27-31 (2nd Half)	4th (1st Half); 2nd (2nd Half)	7.5 (1st Half); 11 (2nd Half)	Jake Miller; Joe Cambria	Did not qualify
1931	Hubs	C	Middle Atlantic	27-22	– (moved to Parkersburg)	moved to Parkersburg	Joe Cambria	Did not qualify

== Hagerstown Blue Ridge League / Middle Atlantic League season leaders ==
Hagerstown Blue Ridge / Middle Atlantic League Season Leaders
Year	Name	Category	Number
1916	Dysert, Charles	Runs	71
1916	McCleary, Chalkey	Winning percentage	.667 (18-9)
1917	Hurley, Jack	Batting average	.385
1917	Dysert, Charles (tied with one other)	Runs	84
1917	Hurley, Jack	Hits	125
1917	Howard, Earl	Wins	25
1917	Howard, Earl	Strikeouts	163
1917	Howard, Earl	Winning percentage	.714 (25-10)
1918	Hickey, H. L.	Runs	15
1918	Keen, Vic	Wins	4 (tied with two others)
1918	Keen, Vic	Strikeouts	33
1920	Dye, Charles	Wins	18
1920	Clarke, Alan	Strikeouts	150
1920	Dye, Charles	Winning percentage	.720 (18-7)
1925	Scheiminant, George	Runs	93
1925	Thomas, George	Home Runs	19
1925	Zubris, Joseph	Wins (tied with one other)	20
1925	Zubris, Joseph	Strikeouts	163
1925	Kendricks, Alfred	Winning percentage	.818 (18-4)
1926	Fishbaugh, Harry	Wins	17
1926	Dolan, Phil	Winning percentage	.833 (15-3)
1928	Thomas, George	Home runs	13
1929	Wertman, Frank	Strikeouts	167
1930	Phelps, Babe	Batting average	.376
1930	Phelps, Babe	Hits	175
1931	Phelps, Babe	Batting average	.408 (includes Parkersburg/Youngstown)
1931	Phelps, Babe	Hits	178 (includes Parkersburg/Youngstown)

== See also ==
- Hagerstown Owls
- Hagerstown Suns
- Municipal Stadium (Hagerstown)
- Blue Ridge League
- Middle Atlantic League
