= Chambersburg Maroons =

Baseball team in Pennsylvania, U.S.

Logo
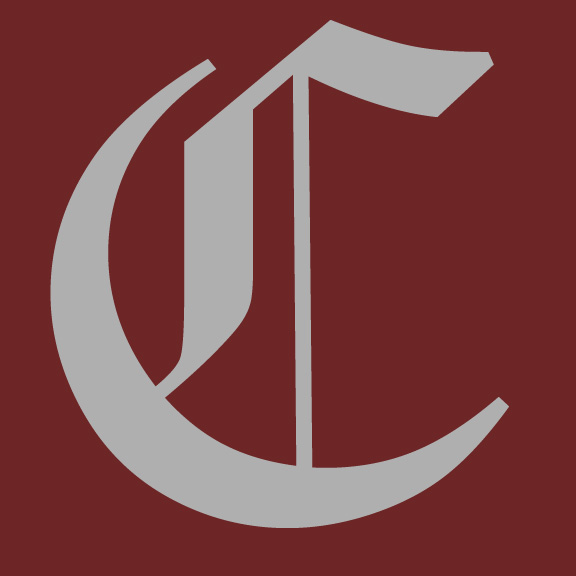
Cap insignia

Information
- League: West Shore Twilight Baseball League (2004–2010)
- Location: Chambersburg, Pennsylvania (1895–2010)
- Ballpark: Henninger Field (1895–2010)
- Founded: 1895
- League championships: Cumberland Valley League- 1 (1895); Blue Ridge League-3 (1916, 1927, 1930); Franklin County Adult League -3 (1979, 1983, 1986)
- Former name: Chambersburg Young Yanks (1929–1930); Cumberland Colts (1917)
- Former leagues: Blue Ridge Adult League (1987–2003); Franklin County Adult League (1931–1986); Independent (1918–1919); Blue Ridge League (1915–1917, 1920–1930); Industrial League (1901–1914); Cumberland Valley League (1895–1900)
- Colors: Maroon, Grey, Black, White
- Ownership: Steve Patterson
- Management: Steve Patterson (GM)
- Manager: Steve Patterson: Bart Patterson (3rd Base)
- Website: Chambersburg Maroons

The Chambersburg Maroons were a baseball team located in Chambersburg, Pennsylvania. They called historic Henninger Field their home, and had done so since the club's creation in 1895. They played their last season in 2010, ending 116 years of existence.

== History ==
=== Early years ===
Baseball has been in Chambersburg since the late nineteenth century. On May 16, 1883, a portable dynamo and six 2,000-watt candle lamps were placed on a railcar by the Cumberland Valley Railroad at a cost of $2,753.75. The apparatus was given its first trial run at a night baseball game between George Pensinger's railroad team and Henninger's club from Chambersburg. Many consider this to be the first night baseball game ever played.

A Chambersburg team was part of the Keystone Association which played for one season in 1884. The team, which had no nickname, was managed by Oliver Chambers and finished with a record of 8 wins and 10 losses, 6.5 games behind the first place Lancaster Red Stockings.

=== Cumberland Valley League ===
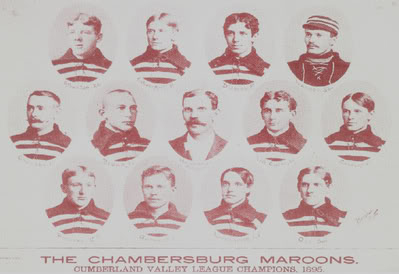
The Maroons in 1895

The Maroons were created in 1895 by local businessman Clay "Pop" Henninger, who ran a thriving hat shop in Chambersburg. They began play at Wolf Park, the same location throughout their entire tenure. The Maroons were charter members of the Cumberland Valley League, an independent minor league, and won the first league title in 1895. In the following season, the Maroons finish in second place in the league, boasting a 22–14 record. The 1896 Maroons squad boasted a total of seven future Major League Players.

Following the 1900 Season, the Maroons left the Cumberland Valley League to join the Industrial League.

=== Blue Ridge League ===
==== 1915 ====
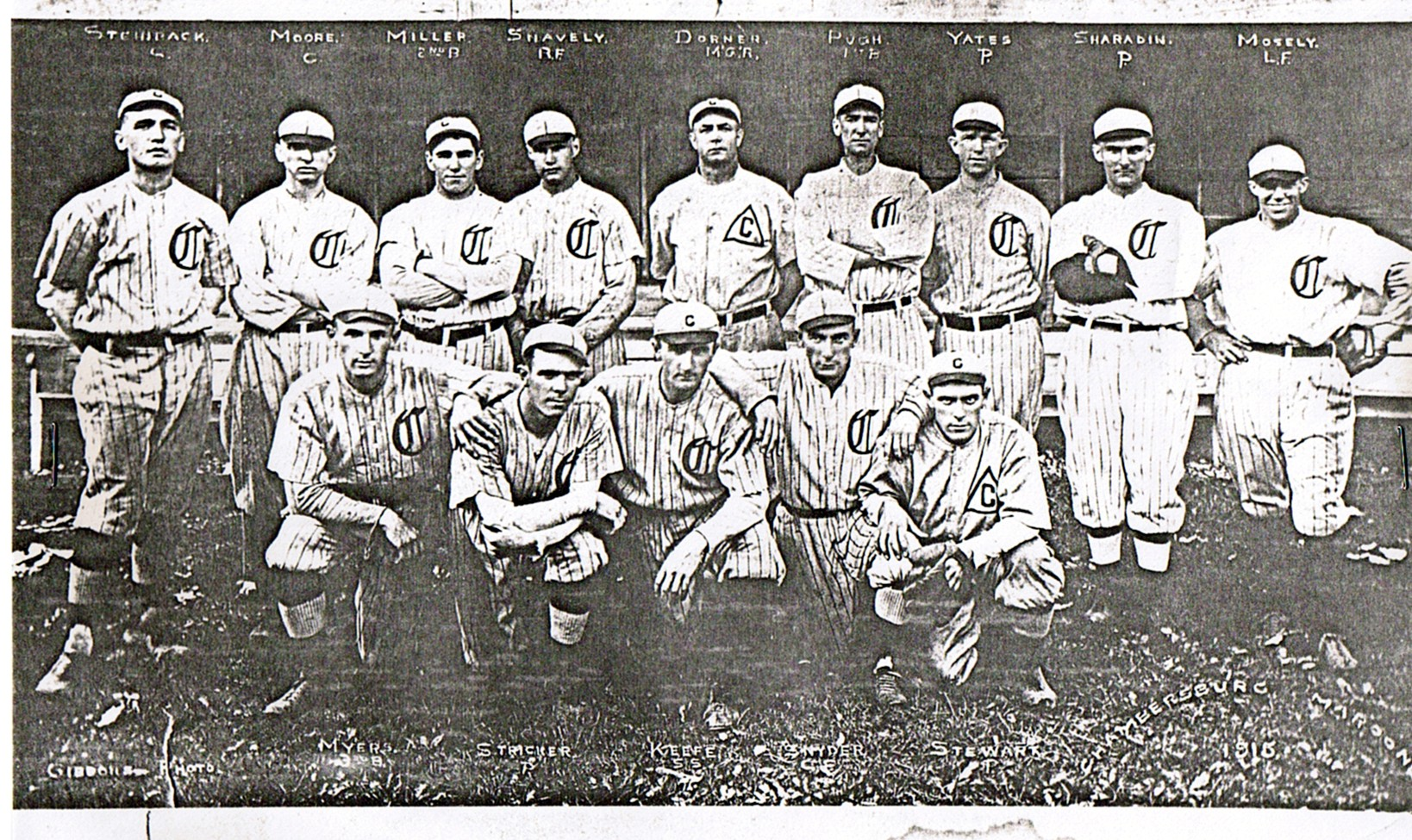
The 1915 Chambersburg Maroons

After the 1914 season, the Maroons join the newly formed Class D Blue Ridge League in 1915. The Maroons gain instant credibility when former Major League Player Gus Dorner took the managerial position of his hometown team. James "Bugs" Snyder led the league in hits with 50. Pitcher Ed Stricker had an outstanding season, leading the league with 170 strikeouts. Stricker also threw a no hitter against the Gettysburg Patriots on August 3, winning 1–0. Stricker and catcher George Stroh (who played part of the season with the Hanover Hornets) were selected to the Blue Ridge League End of Season All-Star Team. However, the Maroons struggled through two subsequent managerial changes that season and finished last in the league. Carl Snavely, a member of the 1915 team, would later rise to prominence as a college football coach.

==== 1916 Championship Season ====
In 1916, the Maroons brought in a new manager in Eddie Hooper. The Maroons club president, named Kottcamp, worked out a deal with Jack Dunn's Baltimore Orioles, who had returned to the International League, after the demise of the Federal League during the off-season. Two pitchers, Hank Thormahlen and Al Ehmling, and a catcher named Alex Schaufele joined the Maroons, along with a former Federal League player, first baseman Karl Kolseth, and outfielder James "Bugs" Snyder to combine for one of the strongest overall teams in the league in 1916. Hanson Horsey is also showcased on the squad's roster.

The result would see Chambersburg take the league crown in 1916, with Hooper edging Frederick's Clyde Barnhart for the league batting title (.332). Hooper also led the league with 113 hits. The Maroons' pennant did not come easy, as the Martinsburg Mountaineers battled with the Maroons for first place throughout the season. Despite finishing the season with more wins than another Blue Ridge League team, Martinsburg had to settle for second for the second straight season, this time by just one-tenth of a percentage point. The Maroons finished the season with a record of 53–40–4. A low point in the otherwise tremendous season was the no-hitter tossed by the Hagerstown Terrier's pitcher Wick Winslow on June 28, defeating the Maroons 4–0.

==== 1917 ====
The 1917 squad was a far cry from the 1916 championship team, and finished with a measly record of 36–63, good for last place in the Blue Ridge League. The Maroons refused to pay a $450 forfeit fee for the league, and things started to go downhill from there. The Maroons were plagued by injuries in the 1917 season, most notably to first baseman Karl Kolseth. Kolseth, the most feared hitter in the league at the time, broke his leg sliding into second base during the first week of the season, and was out for the remainder of the season. The Maroons also suffered from being at odds with fans, one of the local newspapers, and club directors. On June 30, Blue Ridge League President James Vincent Jameson, Jr. awarded the franchise to Colonel Rusler of Cumberland. After two games on the road, the franchise was renamed the Cumberland Colts. Manager Eddie Hooper refused to report to Cumberland and resigned in protest, along with several players. He was replaced by player/coach Brook Crist. The move to Cumberland created some problems for the team. Allegheny County, Maryland, where Cumberland is located, had no "blue laws" prohibiting play on Sundays. The Colts played many games on Sunday drawing large crowds, but antagonizing other teams in the league. Another challenge was transportation. With the roads of the time, it required almost eight hours of time to drive from Gettysburg, Pennsylvania, to Cumberland. This meant teams had to plan overnight stays which increased club expenses. Among the players on the 1917 team was Ivan "Pete" Bigler. Bigler would eventually become the head football and basketball coach at Worcester Polytechnic Institute (WPI) and was enshrined in the WPI Athletic Hall of Fame in 1984.

==== 1918 and 1919 ====
World War I affected the Blue Ridge League and Chambersburg. Wolf Field, the home field of the Maroons, was plowed up and converted to agricultural purposes. Without a home field and with the war demands for soldiers, the Maroons were unable to field a team in 1918 in the Blue Ridge League. The effects of the war, the flu epidemic that raged throughout the country the latter part of 1918, and the limited resources and finances of the remaining league towns, kept the Blue Ridge League from returning in 1919, which was a boom to the area Industrial Leagues and independent teams.

==== 1920 ====
The Maroons returned to the Blue Ridge League in 1920, and finished with a record of 38–56. Maroons player Bill Satterlee led the Blue Ridge League with a .355 batting average and 122 hits, turning in a stellar season for the Maroons. Wolf Park was renamed Henninger Field in honor of baseball entrepreneur Clay Henninger.

==== 1921 ====
In 1921, the Maroons had a record of 46–52, finishing 13 games behind Frederick. Among the outstanding players were Bill Satterlee, who led the league with 31 doubles; and Mike Fuhrey, who topped the league with 31 sacrifice hits. Players selected for the Blue Ridge League End of Season All Star Team were right-handed pitcher Charles Raab, catcher Marion "Jack" Staylor, shortstop Mike Fuhrey and outfielder Charles "Dutch" Mullen.

==== 1922 ====
The 1922 season was only slightly better than the 1921 season, with a record of 46 wins and 49 losses. George Thomas led all Blue Ridge League second basemen with a .977 fielding average. Maroons pitcher Andy Ferner tied with Bill King of Frederick for the league lead with 228 innings pitched. Right handed pitcher Mike Dowell and catcher Lawrence Steinbach were 1922 Blue Ridge League End of Season All-Star Team selections.

==== 1923–1926 ====
The Maroons continued their losing ways during this period, never finishing better than 13 games behind the first place team. There were also managerial changes, with different managers in each of the four years. Among the few high points was Leroy Byham leading the league with 16 wins in 1924. That same year George Thomas led the league in runs scored with 89.

==== 1927 Championship Season ====
The franchise's fortunes changed in 1927. Chambersburg captured the first half title under manager Mickey Keliher. They also finished first overall in the league, with an impressive 65–34 record. Charles Hamel led the league with 87 runs scored. Pitcher Lester Shatzer led the league in wins and winning percentage (16–2, .888). Unlike 1916, where the Maroons were awarded the championship based on the best overall season record, the Maroons would have to compete in a championship series against the Martinsburg Blue Sox. The Maroons prevailed over the Blue Sox, two games to none. Another change from 1916 was the establishment of an inter-league series between the champions of the Blue Ridge League and the champions of the Eastern Shore League. This series was called the Five State Championship. In this series the Chambersburg Maroons lost to the Eastern Shore Parksley Spuds four games to two. 7,000 fans attended the Five State Championship.

==== 1928 ====
The Maroons won the second half championship, earning the right to challenge first half champion Hanover Raiders. The Raiders prevailed in the championship series, four games won to one game lost. Pitcher Sheriff Blake led all league pitchers with 17 wins and a .773 winning percentage (17–5). William Howser had an 11–3 record for Chambersburg. After the season the Maroons were purchased by the New York Yankees.

==== 1929 ====
The 1929 team was renamed the Chambersburg Young Yanks to reflect their affiliation with the New York Yankees. Patrick Shea hit a league-topping 17 home runs. On May 31, the Chambersburg and New York teams played an exhibition game at Henniger Field. Although Chambersburg lost 8–1, New York player Babe Ruth thrilled the crowd by hitting a home run, playing first base and even pitching for an inning. Overall, the Maroons finished 15 games behind the overall first place team Martinsburg Blue Sox.

==== 1930 Championship Season ====
Chambersburg's last season in the Blue Ridge League proved to be one of their most successful. Individually, Ted Norbert led the league in both runs (99) and home runs (27), while Gene Padburg led all league pitchers with a .786 winning percentage (11–3). Chambersburg won the league championship two games to one over the Waynesboro Red Birds. With the collapse of the Blue Ridge League, Chambersburg would never again field a fully professional baseball team.

Chambersburg Maroons Blue Ridge League Season Records
Season	Name	Class	Affiliate	Record	Finish	Games Behind	Manager	Postseason
1915	Chambersburg Maroons	D	–	28-51	6th	26.5	Gus Dorner; George Stroh; Bill Clay	None
1916	Chambersburg Maroons	D	–	53-40	1st	–	Ed Hooper	None (League Champions)
1917	Chambersburg Maroons; Cumberland Colts	D	–	16–25; 20-38	6th	26	Ed Hooper; Brook Crist	None
1920	Chambersburg Maroons	D	–	38-56	5th	17	Ed Hooper	None
1921	Chambersburg Maroons	D	–	46-52	5th	13	Harry Hinchman	None
1922	Chambersburg Maroons	D	–	46-49	5th	10	Mike Mowrey	Did not qualify
1923	Chambersburg Maroons	D	–	41-55	4th	25.5	Mike Mowrey; Wayne Dowell	Did not qualify
1924	Chambersburg Maroons	D	–	47-52	3rd	13	Frank "Red" McDermott; George "Buck" Ramsey	Did not qualify
1925	Chambersburg Maroons	D	–	39-59	5th	25	Ed Goosetree; Patsy O’Rourke; John Reistenberg; John Hummel	Did not qualify
1926	Chambersburg Maroons	D	–	(1st Half) 20–31 (2nd Half) 18-24	5th 4th	18; 7.5	Alvin Julian; Rankin Johnson	Did not qualify
1927	Chambersburg Maroons	D	–	(1st Half) 32–18 (2nd Half) 33-16	1st 2nd	– 0.5	Mickey Keliher	Defeated Martinsburg 2–0 in Blue Ridge League Championship; Lost to Parksley 4–2 in Five State Championship
1928	Chambersburg Maroons	D	–	(1st Half) 27–22 (2nd Half) 30-15	2nd-tie 1st	4 –	Mickey Keliher	Lost to Hanover 4–1 in Blue Ridge League Championship
1929	Chambersburg Young Yanks	D	New York Yankees	(1st Half) 28–29 (2nd Half) 25-32	4th 4th	7.5; 13	Tom Clarke	Did not qualify
1930	Chambersburg Young Yanks	D	New York Yankees	(1st Half) 31–24 (2nd Half) 38-20	1st-tie 1st	– –	Leo Mackey	Defeated Waynesboro 2–1 to win 1st half championship Awarded league title

=== Adult Leagues ===
The Chambersburg Maroons name lived on in semiprofessional leagues. The Chambersburg Maroons played in a semiprofessional league also called the Blue Ridge League in 1934. In 1935, the Maroons were members of the semiprofessional Cumberland Valley League.

==== Franklin County Adult League ====
The Maroons were members of the Franklin County Adult League (FCAL) from 1936 to 1986. In 1979, the Maroons won the first of their three FCAL championships. In 1983, after struggling early, the Maroons reeled off 28 straight wins and finished with a 31–5 mark. This led to its second FCAL championship, under second-year manager "Dollar Bill" DeMoss. In 1986, Chambersburg won a third FCAL title.

==== Blue Ridge Adult League ====
The Maroons moved to the Blue Ridge Adult League (BRAL) in 1987, playing there through 2003. Outfielder Brian McCrossen was selected to the 2001 BRAL end of season All-League Team. First baseman Tony Ponton, third baseman Aaron Edwards, shortstop Andy Smith and utility player Brian Ramsey were chosen for the 2003 BRAL end of season All-League Team.

=== West Shore Twilight Baseball League ===
In 2004, the Chambersburg Maroons joined the semipro West Shore Twilight Baseball League. The Maroons qualified for the playoffs in 2006, 2009, and 2010. However, they were unsuccessful in their quest to win the playoffs in any of the three years. The team played their last games in the quarterfinals of the league championship in 2010 against the Mechanicsburg Cardinals. The last home game at Henniger Field was played on July 27, 2010, with Chambersburg losing 8–0 to Mechanicsburg. The last game for the franchise was played at Mechanicsburg's Rickenbach/Shirley Field on July 28, 2010, with Chambersburg again losing 6–3.

Chambersburg Maroons West Shore Twilight Baseball League Season Records
Season	Level	League	Division	Record	Finish	Games Behind	Playoffs
2004	Semipro	West Shore Twilight Baseball League	–	5-25	5th	17	Did Not Quality
2005	Semipro	West Shore Twilight Baseball League	–	9-19	6th	15	Did not qualify
2006	Semipro	West Shore Twilight Baseball League	–	20-10	2nd	2	Lost to Shippensburg Stars 3 games to 1 in semifinals
2007	Semipro	West Shore Twilight Baseball League	–	9-21	9th	16.5	Did not qualify
2008	Semipro	West Shore Twilight Baseball League	–	11-20	10th	17	Did not qualify
2009	Semipro	West Shore Twilight Baseball League	–	22-11	3rd (tie)	3	Defeated Cumberland Dodgers 3 games to 2 in Quarterfinals; Lost to Shippensburg Stars 3 games to 2 in semifinals
2010	Semipro	West Shore Twilight Baseball League	South	15-15	4th	6.5	Lost to Mechanicsburg Cardinals 3 games to 0 in quarterfinals

== Major league connections ==
=== Chambersburg Team Players Who Made the Majors ===
Mike Mowrey played for and managed the Maroons in the 1922 season, following his playing days with several major league teams. His ventures included a World Series appearance for the Brooklyn Robins in 1916. In 1922, he batted .351 in the 75 games he played. Despite his efforts, Chambersburg finished next to last in the Blue Ridge League, and Mowrey left professional baseball for a quiet life in the town. Mowrey died in 1947 and his memorial service was held at Henninger Field.

Herb Thormahlen also played for the Maroons in 1916 while the club was still a part of the Blue Ridge League. The Maroons pitcher ended playing in the Major Leagues for the New York Yankees (1917–1920), Boston Red Sox (1921), and Brooklyn Robins (1925). Thormahlen's pitching helped lead the Maroons to the 1916 Blue Ridge League pennant.

What follows is a list of Major League Players who have played for Chambersburg by year.

1884	1896	1915	1916	1917
Bart Cantz	George Barclay	Bill Clay	Joe Boley	Ivan Bigler
Ed Green	Billy Goeckel	Norman Plitt	Hanson Horsey	Joe Cobb
Bobby Mitchell	Con Lucid	Charlie Snell	Karl Kolseth	Hanson Horsey
James Morris	Togie Pittinger		Herb Thormahlen	Leo Meyer
George Noftsker	Jimmy Sheckard		Ben Mallonee	Elmer Steele
Ed Sales	Archie Stimmel			
Mike Tiernan	Harry Wilhelm			

1921	1922	1923	1926	1927	1928	1929	1930
Harry Hinchman	Mike Mowrey	Red McDermott	Rankin Johnson	Mickey Keliher	Mickey Keliher	Dick Barrett	Tom Carey
		Mike Mowrey		Rusty Saunders	Mike Meola		Vito Tamulis
							Clay Bryant
							Dee Miles

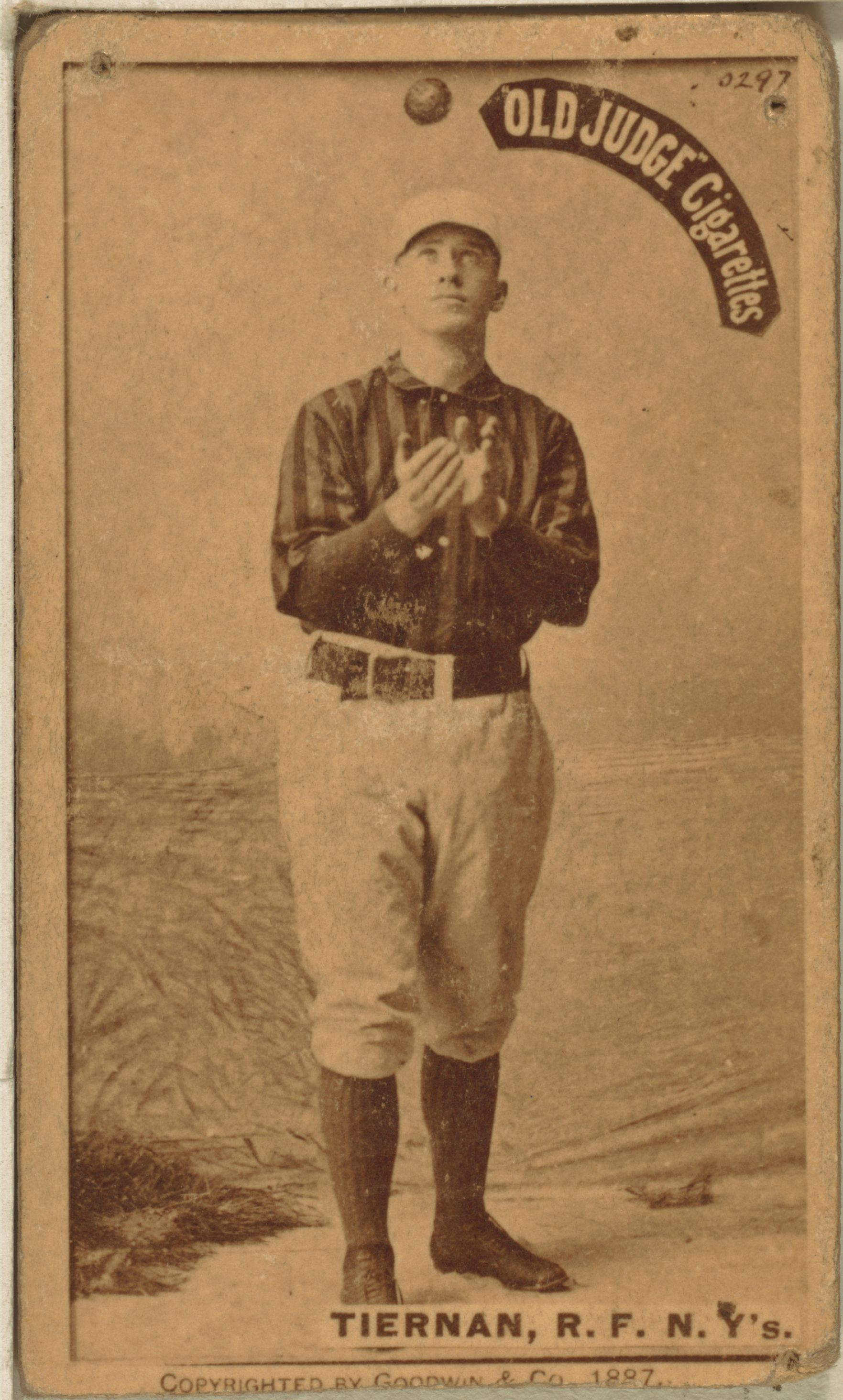
Mike Tiernan

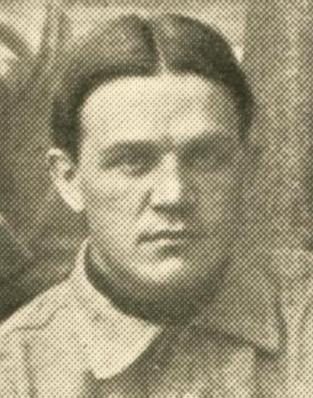
Billy Goeckel

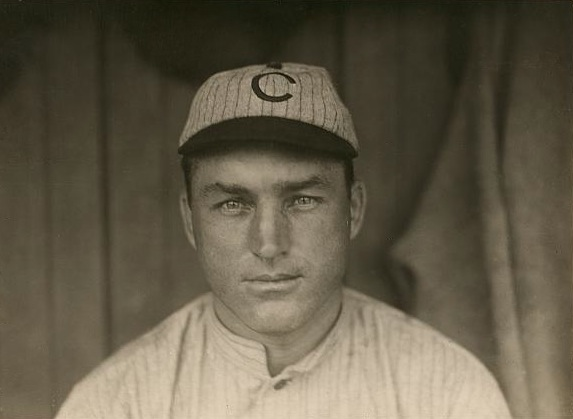
Jimmy Sheckard

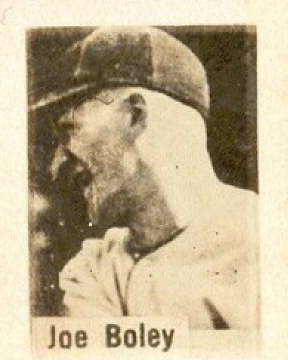
Joe Boley

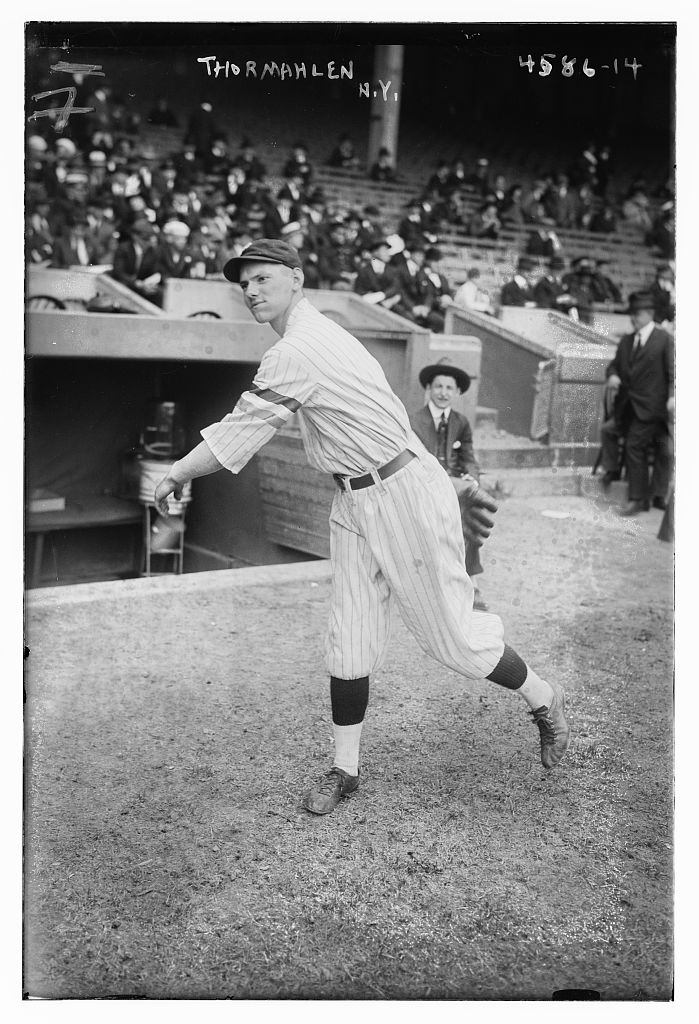
Herb Thormalen

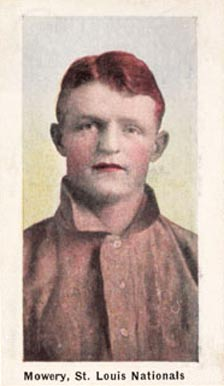
Mike Mowrey

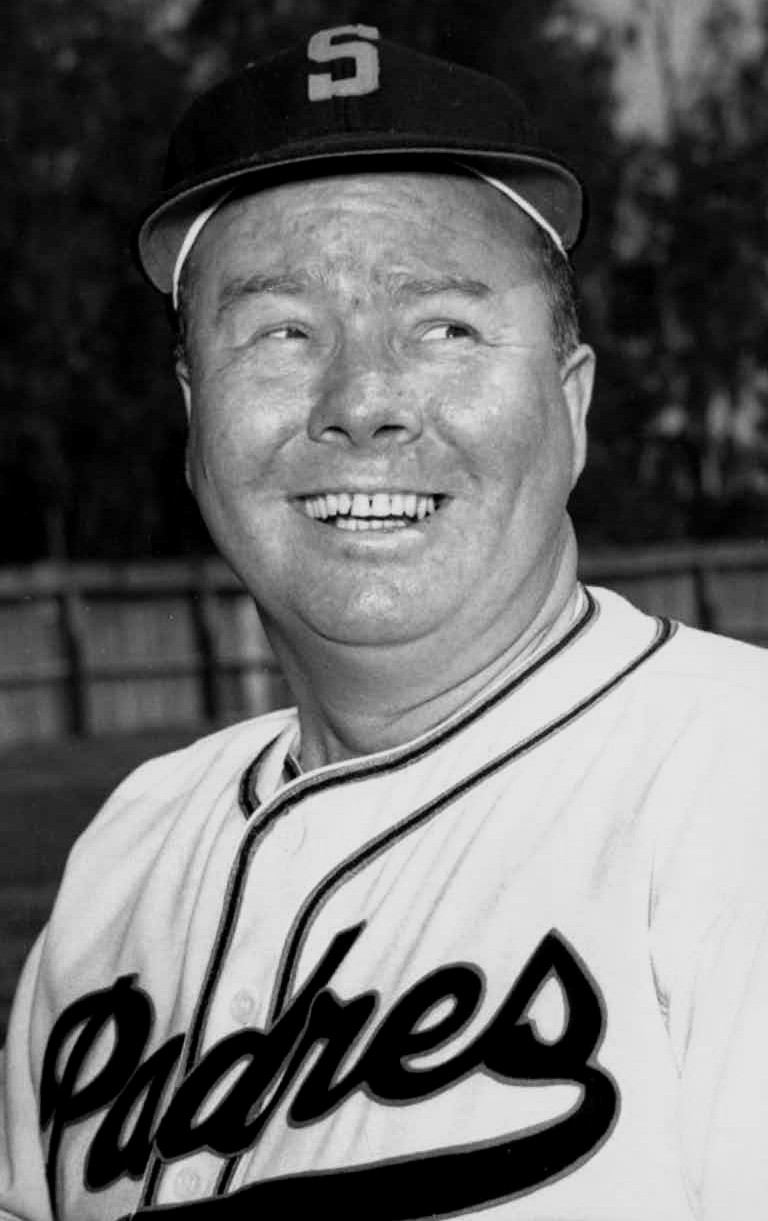
Dick Barrett

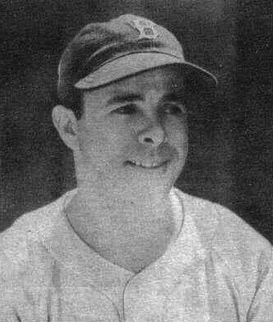
Tom Carey

=== Area People Associated with Major League Baseball ===
In addition to the players on the Chambersburg teams, several other individuals from Franklin County, Pennsylvania, where Chambersburg is located, have connections to Major League Baseball. Among these are:

- Ike Brookens, pitcher with the Detroit Tigers in 1975.
- Jeff Brookens, scout for the Chicago Cubs, Milwaukee Brewers and Cincinnati Reds.
- Tom Brookens, third baseman with the Detroit Tigers, New York Yankees and Cleveland Indians.
- Bob Carter, scout for the Los Angeles Dodgers, Kansas City Royals and Baltimore Orioles. Died June 3, 1997.
- Gus Dorner, pitcher with the Boston Beaneaters, Cincinnati Reds and Cleveland Naps from 1902 to 1909.
- John Fierro, trainer for the Philadelphia Phillies and Chicago Cubs.
- Nellie Fox, infielder. Inducted into Baseball's Hall of Fame on August 3, 1997.
- Rube Manning, pitcher for the New York Highlanders from 1907 to 1910.
- Bob Moorhead, pitcher for the New York Mets in 1962 and 1965.
- Jack Mull, coach for the 1985 San Francisco Giants.
- Sam Snider, bullpen catcher for the Baltimore Orioles.
- Piggy Ward, outfielder for the Philadelphia Quakers, Baltimore Orioles, Cincinnati Reds, Washington Senators from 1883 to 1894.
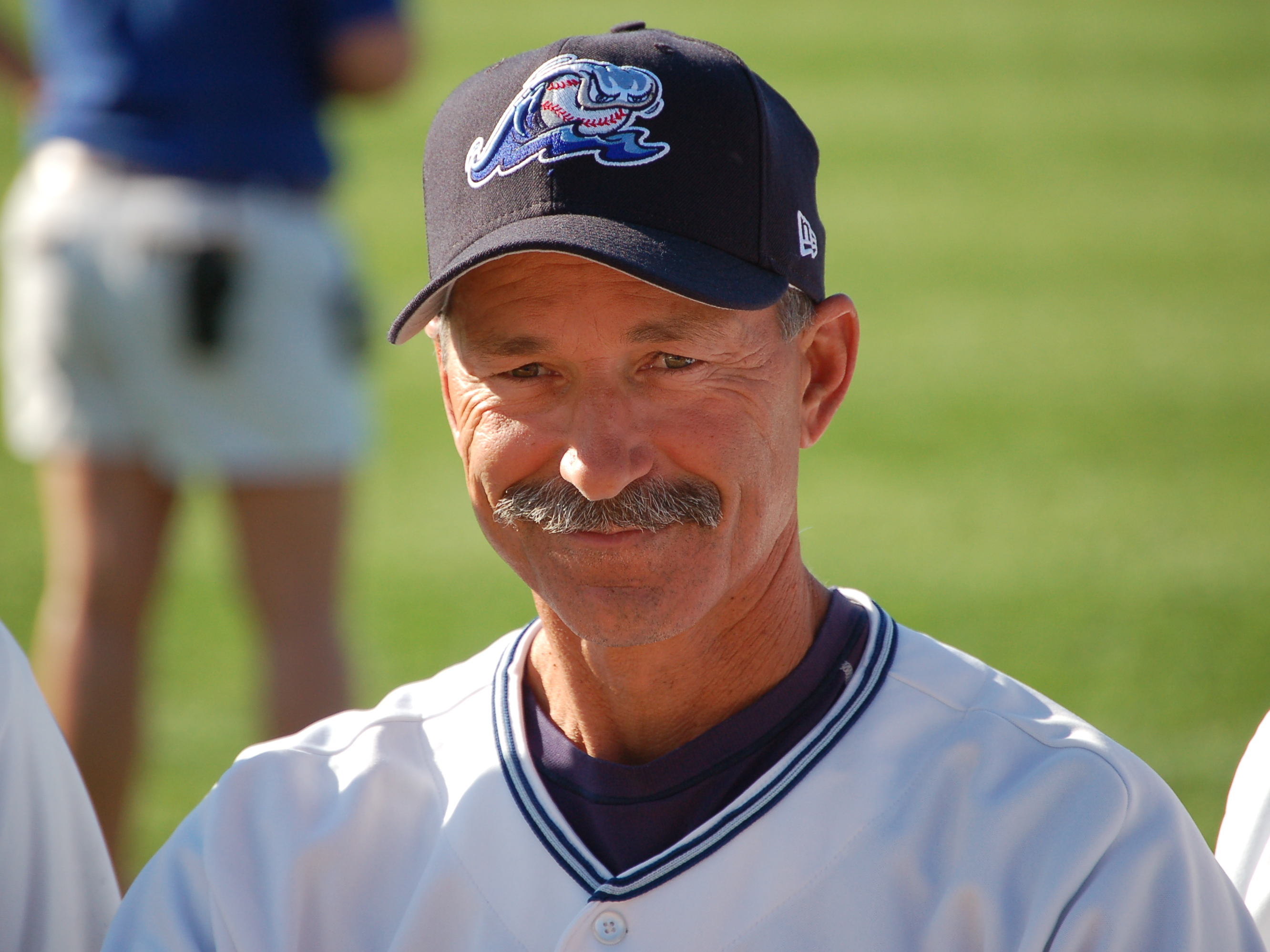
Tom Brookens

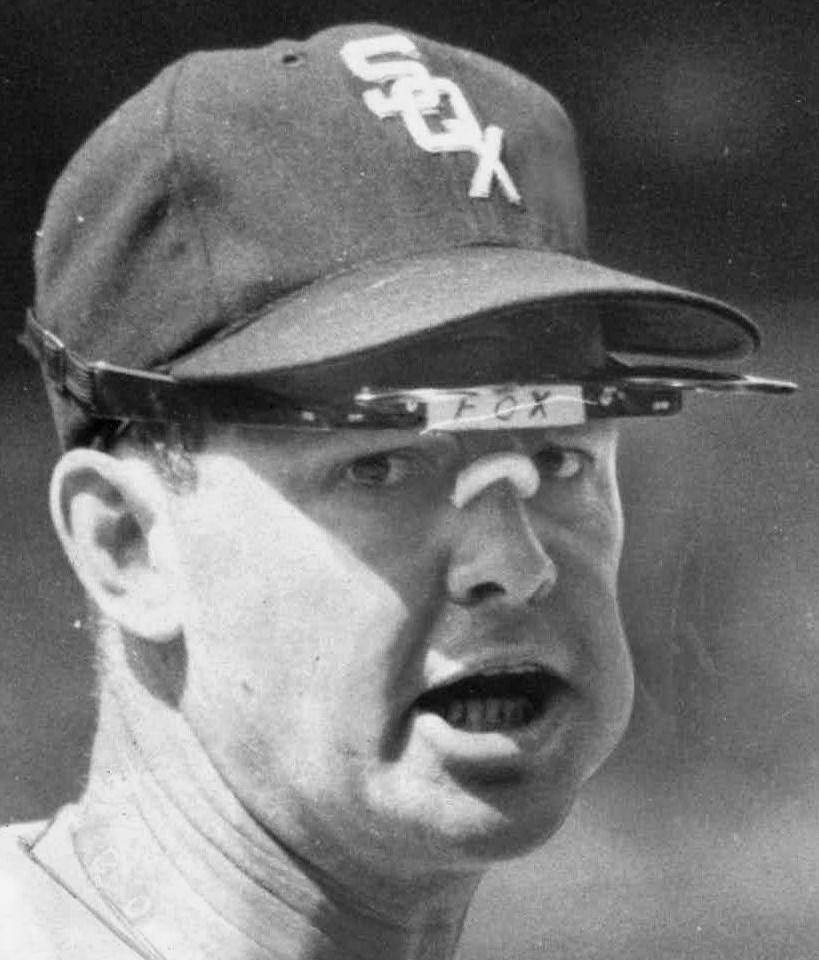
Nellie Fox

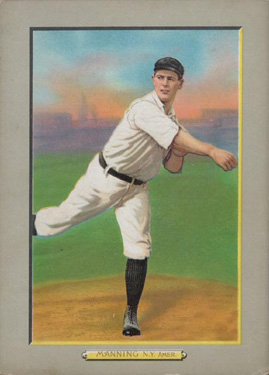
Rube Manning
