= 1969 Carolina League season =

- League: Carolina League
- Sport: Baseball
- Duration: April 16 – September 1
- Number of games: 144
- Number of teams: 10

Regular season
- Season MVP: Lou Quinn, Salem Rebels

Playoffs
- League champions: Raleigh-Durham Phillies
- Runners-up: Burlington Senators

CL seasons
- ← 1968 1970 →

The 1969 Carolina League was a Class A baseball season played between April 16 and September 1. Ten teams played a 144-game schedule, with the top four teams in each division qualifying for the post-season.

The Raleigh-Durham Phillies won the Carolina League championship, defeating the Burlington Senators in the final round of the playoffs.

== Team changes ==
- The Greensboro Patriots fold.
- The Tidewater Tides leave the league and join the International League.
- The Wilson Tobs relocate to Red Springs, North Carolina and are renamed the Red Springs Twins. The club remains affiliated with the Minnesota Twins.
- The High Point-Thomasville Hi-Toms began a new affiliation with the Kansas City Royals. The club is renamed the High Point-Thomasville Royals.
- The Peninsula Grays ended their affiliation with the Oakland Athletics and began a new affiliation with the Houston Astros. The club was renamed the Peninsula Astros.
- The Raleigh-Durham Mets ended their affiliation with the New York Mets and began a new affiliation with the Philadelphia Phillies. The club was renamed the Raleigh-Durham Phillies.

== Teams ==
1969 Carolina League
Division	Team	City	MLB Affiliate	Stadium
East	Kinston Eagles	Kinston, North Carolina	New York Yankees	Grainger Stadium
East	Peninsula Astros	Hampton, Virginia	Houston Astros	War Memorial Stadium
East	Raleigh-Durham Phillies	Raleigh, North Carolina	Philadelphia Phillies	Devereaux Meadow
East	Red Springs Twins	Red Springs, North Carolina	Minnesota Twins	Robbins Park
East	Rocky Mount Leafs	Rocky Mount, North Carolina	Detroit Tigers	Municipal Stadium
West	Burlington Senators	Burlington, North Carolina	Washington Senators	Burlington Athletic Stadium
West	High Point-Thomasville Royals	Thomasville, North Carolina	Kansas City Royals	Finch Field
West	Lynchburg White Sox	Lynchburg, Virginia	Chicago White Sox	City Stadium
West	Salem Rebels	Salem, Virginia	Pittsburgh Pirates	Salem Municipal Field
West	Winston-Salem Red Sox	Winston-Salem, North Carolina	Boston Red Sox	Ernie Shore Field

== Map of teams ==
East division West division

== Regular season ==
=== Summary ===
- The Rocky Mount Leafs finished with the best record in the league for the first time in team history.

=== Standings ===
East division
Team	Win	Loss	%	GB
Rocky Mount Leafs	82	62	.569	–
Raleigh-Durham Phillies	79	62	.560	1.5
Kinston Eagles	74	68	.521	7
Peninsula Astros	67	76	.469	14.5
Red Springs Twins	57	84	.404	23.5
West division
Salem Rebels	78	66	.542	–
Winston-Salem Red Sox	77	67	.535	1
Burlington Senators	71	71	.500	6
High Point-Thomasville Royals	69	74	.483	8.5
Lynchburg White Sox	60	84	.417	18

== League Leaders ==
=== Batting leaders ===
Stat	Player	Total
AVG	Sam Parrilla, Raleigh-Durham Phillies	.383
H	Mel Civil, Salem Rebels	166
R	Rusty Torres, Kinston Eagles	96
2B	César Cedeño, Peninsula Astros	32
3B	Howard Wood, Lynchburg White Sox	13
HR	Greg Luzinski, Raleigh-Durham Phillies	31
RBI	Greg Luzinski, Raleigh-Durham Phillies	92
SB	Mel Civil, Salem Rebels	36

=== Pitching leaders ===
Stat	Player	Total
W	John Penn, Raleigh-Durham Phillies	15
ERA	Buddy Harris, Peninsula Astros	1.84
CG	Jerry Lyscio, High Point-Thomasville Royals; John Penn, Raleigh-Durham Phillies	15
SV	Phil Meeler, Rocky Mount Leafs	28
SO	Mike Garman, Winston-Salem Red Sox; John Penn, Raleigh-Durham Phillies	183
IP	John Penn, Raleigh-Durham Phillies	202.0

== Playoffs ==
- The Raleigh-Durham Phillies won their first Carolina League championship, defeating the Burlington Senators in three games.
- The quarter-finals were extended to a best-of-three series.

=== Playoff bracket ===
Quarter-finals
E1	Rocky Mount	0
E4	Peninsula	2
E2	Raleigh-Durham	2
E3	Kinston	0
W1	Salem	2
W4	High Point-Thomasville	0
W2	Winston-Salem	1
W3	Burlington	2

Semi-finals
E4	Peninsula	1
E2	Raleigh-Durham	2
W1	Salem	0
W3	Burlington	2

Finals
E2	Raleigh-Durham	2
W3	Burlington	1

== Awards ==
Carolina League awards
Award name	Recipient
Most Valuable Player	Luther Quinn, Salem Rebels
Manager of the Year	Al Federoff, Rocky Mount Leafs

== See also ==
- 1969 Major League Baseball season
