= 1971 Carolina League season =

- League: Carolina League
- Sport: Baseball
- Duration: April 16 – September 1
- Number of games: 138
- Number of teams: 8

Regular season
- Season MVP: Richard Giallella, Peninsula Phillies

Playoffs
- League champions: Peninsula Phillies
- Runners-up: Kinston Eagles

CL seasons
- ← 1970 1972 →

The 1971 Carolina League was a Class A baseball season played between April 16 and September 1. Eight teams played a 138-game schedule, with the top team in each half of the season competing for the championship.

The Peninsula Phillies won the Carolina League championship, defeating the Kinston Eagles in the final round of the playoffs.

== Teams ==
1971 Carolina League
Team	City	MLB Affiliate	Stadium
Burlington Senators	Burlington, North Carolina	Washington Senators	Burlington Athletic Stadium
Kinston Eagles	Kinston, North Carolina	New York Yankees	Grainger Stadium
Lynchburg Twins	Lynchburg, Virginia	Minnesota Twins	City Stadium
Peninsula Phillies	Hampton, Virginia	Philadelphia Phillies	War Memorial Stadium
Raleigh-Durham Triangles	Raleigh, North Carolina	None	Devereaux Meadow
Rocky Mount Leafs	Rocky Mount, North Carolina	Detroit Tigers	Municipal Stadium
Salem Rebels	Salem, Virginia	Pittsburgh Pirates	Salem Municipal Field
Winston-Salem Red Sox	Winston-Salem, North Carolina	Boston Red Sox	Ernie Shore Field

== Map of teams ==
Carolina League teams

== Regular season ==
=== Summary ===
- The Peninsula Phillies finished with the best record in the league for the first time since 1965.

=== Standings ===
Carolina League
Team	Win	Loss	%	GB
Peninsula Phillies	85	53	.616	–
Kinston Eagles	83	52	.615	2.5
Lynchburg Twins	68	67	.504	15.5
Winston-Salem Red Sox	67	67	.500	16
Rocky Mount Leafs	65	69	.485	18
Salem Rebels	65	71	.478	19
Raleigh-Durham Triangles	56	80	.412	28
Burlington Senators	54	84	.391	31

== League Leaders ==
=== Batting leaders ===
Stat	Player	Total
AVG	Art Howe, Salem Rebels	.348
H	Nelson Garcia, Peninsula Phillies	155
R	Nelson Garcia, Peninsula Phillies	92
2B	Bob Beall, Peninsula Phillies	31
3B	Fernando González, Salem Rebels	13
HR	Charlie Spikes, Kinston Eagles	22
RBI	Craig Kusick, Lynchburg Twins	91
SB	Mike Cummings, Winston-Salem Red Sox	43

=== Pitching leaders ===
Stat	Player	Total
W	Richard Fusari, Peninsula Phillies	19
ERA	Richard Fusari, Peninsula Phillies	2.19
CG	Richard Fusari, Peninsula Phillies	18
SV	George Pfeiffer, Winston-Salem Red Sox	15
SO	Donald Schroeder, Kinston Eagles	176
IP	Richard Fusari, Peninsula Phillies	222.0

== Playoffs ==
- The Peninsula Phillies won their first Carolina League championship, defeating the Kinston Eagles in two games.

=== Playoff bracket ===
Finals
1	Peninsula	2
2	Kinston	0

== Awards ==
Carolina League awards
Award name	Recipient
Most Valuable Player	Richard Giallella, Peninsula Phillies
Manager of the Year	Gene Hassell, Kinston Eagles

== See also ==
- 1971 Major League Baseball season
