= 1972 Carolina League season =

- League: Carolina League
- Sport: Baseball
- Duration: April 14 – August 30
- Number of games: 138
- Number of teams: 6

Regular season
- Season MVP: Dave Parker, Salem Pirates

Playoffs
- League champions: Salem Pirates
- Runners-up: Burlington Rangers

CL seasons
- ← 1971 1973 →

The 1972 Carolina League was a Class A baseball season played between April 14 and August 30. Six teams played a 138-game schedule, with the top team in each half of the season competing for the championship.

The Salem Pirates won the Carolina League championship, defeating the Burlington Rangers in the final round of the playoffs.

== Team changes ==
- The Peninsula Phillies leave the league and join the International League.
- The Raleigh-Durham Triangles fold.
- The Burlington Senators are renamed the Burlington Rangers. The club remains affiliated with the Texas Rangers following the relocation of the Washington Senators.
- The Salem Rebels are renamed the Salem Pirates. The club remains affiliated with the Pittsburgh Pirates.

== Teams ==
1972 Carolina League
Team	City	MLB Affiliate	Stadium
Burlington Rangers	Burlington, North Carolina	Texas Rangers	Burlington Athletic Stadium
Kinston Eagles	Kinston, North Carolina	New York Yankees	Grainger Stadium
Lynchburg Twins	Lynchburg, Virginia	Minnesota Twins	City Stadium
Rocky Mount Leafs	Rocky Mount, North Carolina	Detroit Tigers	Municipal Stadium
Salem Pirates	Salem, Virginia	Pittsburgh Pirates	Salem Municipal Field
Winston-Salem Red Sox	Winston-Salem, North Carolina	Boston Red Sox	Ernie Shore Field

== Map of teams ==
Carolina League teams

== Regular season ==
=== Summary ===
- The Salem Pirates finished with the best record in the league for the first time since 1968.

=== Standings ===
Carolina League
Team	Win	Loss	%	GB
Salem Pirates	79	58	.577	–
Burlington Rangers	77	61	.558	2.5
Kinston Eagles	73	64	.533	6
Lynchburg Twins	70	68	.507	9.5
Winston-Salem Red Sox	65	74	.468	15
Rocky Mount Leafs	49	88	.358	30

== League Leaders ==
=== Batting leaders ===
Stat	Player	Total
AVG	Dane Iorg, Burlington Rangers	.321
H	Dave Parker, Salem Pirates	162
R	Dave Parker, Salem Pirates	91
2B	Dave Parker, Salem Pirates	30
3B	Ed Ott, Salem Pirates	10
HR	Bob Gorinski, Lynchburg Twins	23
RBI	Dave Parker, Salem Pirates	101
SB	Dave Parker, Salem Pirates	38

=== Pitching leaders ===
Stat	Player	Total
W	Jim Minshall, Salem Pirates	16
ERA	Rick Kemp, Burlington Rangers	2.38
CG	Doug Bair, Salem Pirates	15
SV	Walter Walters, Kinston Eagles	16
SO	Dave Pagan, Kinston Eagles	192
IP	Jim Hughes, Lynchburg Twins	192.0

== Playoffs ==
- The Salem Pirates won their first Carolina League championship, defeating the Burlington Rangers in three games.

=== Playoff bracket ===
Finals
1	Salem	2
2	Burlington	1

== Awards ==
Carolina League awards
Award name	Recipient
Most Valuable Player	Dave Parker, Salem Pirates
Manager of the Year	Gene Hassell, Kinston Eagles

== See also ==
- 1972 Major League Baseball season
