= 1970 Carolina League season =

- League: Carolina League
- Sport: Baseball
- Duration: April 17 – September 2
- Number of games: 140
- Number of teams: 8

Regular season
- Season MVP: Cliff Johnson, Raleigh-Durham Triangles

Playoffs
- League champions: Winston-Salem Red Sox
- Runners-up: Burlington Senators

CL seasons
- ← 1969 1971 →

The 1970 Carolina League was a Class A baseball season played between April 17 and September 2. Eight teams played a 140-game schedule, with the top team in each half of the season competing for the championship.

The Winston-Salem Red Sox won the Carolina League championship, defeating the Burlington Senators in the final round of the playoffs.

== League changes ==
- With two more teams leaving the league, the divisional format was dropped.
- The top team in each half of the season would compete for the league championship.

== Team changes ==
- The High Point-Thomasville Royals fold.
- The Red Springs Twins fold.
- The Raleigh-Durham Phillies end their affiliation with the Philadelphia Phillies. The team is renamed the Raleigh-Durham Triangles.
- The Lynchburg White Sox end their affiliation with the Chicago White Sox. The team begins a new affiliation with the Minnesota Twins and are renamed the Lynchburg Twins.
- The Peninsula Astros end their affiliation with the Houston Astros. The team begins a new affiliation with the Philadelphia Phillies and are renamed the Peninsula Phillies.

== Teams ==
1970 Carolina League
Team	City	MLB Affiliate	Stadium
Burlington Senators	Burlington, North Carolina	Washington Senators	Burlington Athletic Stadium
Kinston Eagles	Kinston, North Carolina	New York Yankees	Grainger Stadium
Lynchburg Twins	Lynchburg, Virginia	Minnesota Twins	City Stadium
Peninsula Phillies	Hampton, Virginia	Philadelphia Phillies	War Memorial Stadium
Raleigh-Durham Triangles	Raleigh, North Carolina	None	Devereaux Meadow
Rocky Mount Leafs	Rocky Mount, North Carolina	Detroit Tigers	Municipal Stadium
Salem Rebels	Salem, Virginia	Pittsburgh Pirates	Salem Municipal Field
Winston-Salem Red Sox	Winston-Salem, North Carolina	Boston Red Sox	Ernie Shore Field

== Map of teams ==
Carolina League teams

== Regular season ==
=== Summary ===
- The Winston-Salem Red Sox finished with the best record in the league for the first time since 1966.

=== Standings ===
Carolina League
Team	Win	Loss	%	GB
Winston-Salem Red Sox	79	58	.577	–
Raleigh-Durham Triangles	77	63	.550	3.5
Kinston Eagles	72	65	.526	7
Burlington Senators	72	65	.526	7
Rocky Mount Leafs	70	68	.507	9.5
Peninsula Phillies	67	73	.479	13.5
Salem Rebels	60	80	.429	20.5
Lynchburg Twins	57	83	.407	23.5

== League Leaders ==
=== Batting leaders ===
Stat	Player	Total
AVG	Bob Toney, Raleigh-Durham Triangles	.366
H	Rennie Stennett, Salem Rebels	176
R	Fred Frazier, Kinston Eagles	92
2B	Bob Storm, Lynchburg Twins	28
3B	Rennie Stennett, Salem Rebels	9
HR	Cliff Johnson, Raleigh-Durham Triangles	27
RBI	Cliff Johnson, Raleigh-Durham Triangles	91
SB	Roger Nelson, Winston-Salem Red Sox	45

=== Pitching leaders ===
Stat	Player	Total
W	Lynn McGlothen, Winston-Salem Red Sox	15
ERA	Dan Bootcheck, Rocky Mount Leafs	1.92
CG	Lynn McGlothen, Winston-Salem Red Sox	16
SV	Larry Bowlby, Raleigh-Durham Triangles; Roger Hambright, Kinston Eagles	15
SO	Lynn McGlothen, Winston-Salem Red Sox	202
IP	Lynn McGlothen, Winston-Salem Red Sox	229.0

== Playoffs ==
- The Winston-Salem Red Sox won their fourth Carolina League championship, defeating the Burlington Senators in two games.

=== Playoff bracket ===
Finals
1	Winston-Salem	2
2	Burlington	0

== Awards ==
Carolina League awards
Award name	Recipient
Most Valuable Player	Cliff Johnson, Raleigh-Durham Triangles
Manager of the Year	Cliff Davis, Raleigh-Durham Triangles

== See also ==
- 1970 Major League Baseball season
