= 1974 Carolina League season =

- League: Carolina League
- Sport: Baseball
- Duration: April 12 – August 29
- Number of games: 140
- Number of teams: 6

Regular season
- Season MVP: Miguel Diloné, Salem Pirates

Playoffs
- League champions: Salem Pirates

CL seasons
- ← 1973 1975 →

The 1974 Carolina League was a Class A baseball season played between April 12 and August 29. Six teams played a 140-game schedule, with the top team in each half of the season competing for the championship.

The Salem Pirates won the Carolina League championship, as they finished in first place in both halves of the season.

== Team changes ==
- The Wilson Pennants relocate to Hampton, Virginia, and are renamed the Peninsula Pennants.
- The Kinston Eagles begin a new affiliation with the Montreal Expos. The team is renamed the Kinston Expos.

== Teams ==
1974 Carolina League
Team	City	MLB Affiliate	Stadium
Kinston Expos	Kinston, North Carolina	Montreal Expos	Grainger Stadium
Lynchburg Twins	Lynchburg, Virginia	Minnesota Twins	City Stadium
Peninsula Pennants	Hampton, Virginia	None	War Memorial Stadium
Rocky Mount Phillies	Rocky Mount, North Carolina	Philadelphia Phillies	Municipal Stadium
Salem Pirates	Salem, Virginia	Pittsburgh Pirates	Salem Municipal Field
Winston-Salem Red Sox	Winston-Salem, North Carolina	Boston Red Sox	Ernie Shore Field

== Map of teams ==
Carolina League teams

== Regular season ==
=== Summary ===
- The Salem Pirates finished with the best record in the league for the first time since 1972.

=== Standings ===
Carolina League
Team	Win	Loss	%	GB
Salem Pirates	86	51	.628	–
Lynchburg Twins	78	62	.557	9.5
Winston-Salem Red Sox	76	61	.555	10
Rocky Mount Phillies	73	66	.525	14
Peninsula Pennants	58	76	.433	26.5
Kinston Expos	38	93	.290	45

== League Leaders ==
=== Batting leaders ===
Stat	Player	Total
AVG	Frank Grundler, Lynchburg Twins	.335
H	Miguel Diloné, Salem Pirates	177
R	Frank Grundler, Lynchburg Twins	115
2B	Michael Bennett, Winston-Salem Red Sox	28
3B	Frank Grundler, Lynchburg Twins	16
HR	Randy Bass, Lynchburg Twins	30
RBI	Randy Bass, Lynchburg Twins	112
SB	Miguel Diloné, Salem Pirates	85

=== Pitching leaders ===
Stat	Player	Total
W	Don Aase, Winston-Salem Red Sox	17
ERA	Don Aase, Winston-Salem Red Sox	2.43
CG	Don Aase, Winston-Salem Red Sox	18
SV	William Clauss, Lynchburg Twins	12
SO	Dan Greenhalgh, Rocky Mount Phillies	177
IP	Don Aase, Winston-Salem Red Sox	230.0

== Playoffs ==
- The Salem Pirates won their third Carolina League championship, as they won both halves of the regular season.

== Awards ==
Carolina League awards
Award name	Recipient
Most Valuable Player	Miguel Diloné, Salem Pirates
Manager of the Year	Johnny Lipon, Salem Pirates

== See also ==
- 1974 Major League Baseball season
