= 1976 Carolina League season =

- League: Carolina League
- Sport: Baseball
- Duration: April 16 – September 2
- Number of games: 140
- Number of teams: 4

Regular season
- Season MVP: Marshall Brant, Lynchburg Mets

Playoffs
- League champions: Winston-Salem Red Sox

CL seasons
- ← 1975 1977 →

The 1976 Carolina League was a Class A baseball season played between April 16 and September 2. Four teams played a 140-game schedule, with the top team in each half of the season competing for the championship.

The Winston-Salem Red Sox won the Carolina League championship, as they finished in first place in both halves of the season.

== Team changes ==
- The Rocky Mount Phillies relocate to Hampton, Virginia and are renamed the Peninsula Pilots. The club remains affiliated with the Philadelphia Phillies.
- The Lynchburg Rangers ended their affiliation with the Texas Rangers and begin a new affiliation with the New York Mets. The team is renamed the Lynchburg Mets.

== Teams ==
1976 Carolina League
Team	City	MLB Affiliate	Stadium
Lynchburg Mets	Lynchburg, Virginia	New York Mets	City Stadium
Peninsula Pilots	Hampton, Virginia	Philadelphia Phillies	War Memorial Stadium
Salem Pirates	Salem, Virginia	Pittsburgh Pirates	Salem Municipal Field
Winston-Salem Red Sox	Winston-Salem, North Carolina	Boston Red Sox	Ernie Shore Field

== Map of teams ==
Carolina League teams

== Regular season ==
=== Summary ===
- The Winston-Salem Red Sox finished with the best record in the league for the first time since 1970.

=== Standings ===
Carolina League
Team	Win	Loss	%	GB
Winston-Salem Red Sox	80	57	.584	–
Peninsula Pilots	71	65	.522	8.5
Salem Pirates	68	69	.496	12
Lynchburg Mets	64	75	.460	17

== League Leaders ==
=== Batting leaders ===
Stat	Player	Total
AVG	Bobby Brown, Peninsula Pilots	.349
H	Puchy Delgado, Winston-Salem Red Sox	143
R	David Lozano, Lynchburg Mets	89
2B	Marshall Brant, Lynchburg Mets	32
3B	Bobby Brown, Peninsula Pilots	10
HR	Marshall Brant, Lynchburg Mets	23
RBI	Marshall Brant, Lynchburg Mets	93
SB	Puchy Delgado, Winston-Salem Red Sox	52

=== Pitching leaders ===
Stat	Player	Total
W	Don Fowler, Peninsula Pilots; Ed Whitson, Salem Pirates	15
ERA	Frank Ciammachilli, Peninsula Pilots	2.36
CG	Ed Whitson, Salem Pirates	16
SV	Peter Manos, Peninsula Pilots	17
SO	Ed Whitson, Salem Pirates	186
IP	Ed Whitson, Salem Pirates	203.0

== Playoffs ==
- The Winston-Salem Red Sox won their sixth Carolina League championship, as they won both halves of the regular season.

== Awards ==
Carolina League awards
Award name	Recipient
Most Valuable Player	Marshall Brant, Lynchburg Mets
Manager of the Year	Tony Torchia, Winston-Salem Red Sox

== See also ==
- 1976 Major League Baseball season
