= List of Carolina League champions =

The Carolina League of Minor League Baseball is a Single-A baseball league in the United States that began play in 1945. A league champion was determined at the end of each season by either postseason playoffs or being declared champion by the league office. As of 2019, the first half and second-half winners in each division (Northern and Southern) competed in a best-of-five division series. Then, the Northern and Southern division winners played a best-of-five series to determine a league champion.

The 2020 season was cancelled due to the COVID-19 pandemic, and the league ceased operations before the 2021 season in conjunction with Major League Baseball's (MLB) reorganization of Minor League Baseball. In place of the Carolina League, MLB created the Low-A East, a 12-team circuit divided into three divisions. Prior to the 2022 season, MLB renamed the Low-A East as the Carolina League, and it carried on the history of the league prior to reorganization. In 2021, the Low-A East held a best-of-five series between the top two teams in the league, regardless of division standings, to determine a league champion. As of 2022, the winners of each division from both the first and second halves of the season meet in a best-of-three division series, with the winners of the two division series meeting in a best-of-three championship series.

== League champions ==
Series and finalist information is only presented when postseason play occurred. The lack of this information indicates a declared league champion.

Year	Champion	Series	Finalist
1945	Danville Leafs	4–1	Raleigh Capitals
1946	Raleigh Capitals	4–2	Durham Bulls
1947	Raleigh Capitals	4–2	Durham Bulls
1948	Martinsville Athletics	4–2	Burlington Bees
1949	Burlington Bees	4–3	Raleigh Capitals
1950	Winston-Salem Cardinals	4–1	Burlington Bees
1951	Winston-Salem Cardinals	4–1	Reidsville Luckies
1952	Reidsville Luckies	4–0	Durham Bulls
1953	Danville Leafs	4–2	Reidsville Luckies
1954	Fayetteville Highlanders	4–1	Burlington Pirates
1955	Danville Leafs	4–2	High Point-Thomasville Hi-Toms
1956	Fayetteville Highlanders	4–2	Danville Leafs
1957	Durham Bulls	4–3	High Point-Thomasville Hi-Toms
1958	Burlington Indians	2–1	Greensboro Yankees
1959	Wilson Tobs	4–0	Raleigh Capitals
1960	Greensboro Yankees	4–1	Burlington Indians
1961	Wilson Tobs	—	—
1962	Kinston Eagles	4–3	Durham Bulls
1963	Wilson Tobs	2–1	Greensboro Yankees
1964	Winston-Salem Red Sox	2–0	Tidewater Tides
1965	Tidewater Tides	2–0	Durham Bulls
1966	Rocky Mount Leafs	2–0	Winston-Salem Red Sox
1967	Durham Bulls	2–1	Tidewater Tides
1968	High Point-Thomasville Hi-Toms	2–0	Raleigh-Durham Mets
1969	Raleigh-Durham Phillies	2–1	Burlington Senators
1970	Winston-Salem Red Sox	2–0	Burlington Senators
1971	Peninsula Phillies	2–0	Kinston Eagles
1972	Salem Pirates	2–1	Burlington Rangers
1973	Salem Pirates	3–2	Lynchburg Twins
1974	Salem Pirates	—	—
1975	Rocky Mount Phillies	—	—
1976	Winston-Salem Red Sox	—	—
1977	Peninsula Pilots	3–2	Lynchburg Mets
1978	Lynchburg Mets	3–0	Peninsula Pilots
1979	Winston-Salem Red Sox	—	—
1980	Peninsula Pilots	3–1	Durham Bulls
1981	Hagerstown Suns	3–0	Peninsula Pilots
1982	Alexandria Dukes	3–0	Durham Bulls
1983	Lynchburg Mets	3–0	Winston-Salem Red Sox
1984	Lynchburg Mets	3–1	Durham Bulls
1985	Winston-Salem Spirits	3–1	Lynchburg Mets
1986	Winston-Salem Spirits	3–1	Hagerstown Suns
1987	Salem Buccaneers	3–1	Kinston Indians
1988	Kinston Indians	3–2	Lynchburg Red Sox
1989	Prince William Yankees	3–1	Durham Bulls
1990	Frederick Keys	3–2	Kinston Indians
1991	Kinston Indians	3–0	Lynchburg Red Sox
1992	Peninsula Pilots	3–2	Lynchburg Red Sox
1993	Winston-Salem Spirits	3–1	Wilmington Blue Rocks
1994	Wilmington Blue Rocks	3–0	Winston-Salem Spirits
1995	Kinston Indians	3–0	Wilmington Blue Rocks
1996	Wilmington Blue Rocks	3–1	Kinston Indians
1997	Lynchburg Hillcats	3–1	Kinston Indians
1998	Wilmington Blue Rocks	3–1	Winston-Salem Warthogs
1999^{[a]}	Myrtle Beach Pelicans; Wilmington Blue Rocks	2–2	—
2000	Myrtle Beach Pelicans	3–0	Lynchburg Hillcats
2001	Salem Avalanche	3–2	Wilmington Blue Rocks
2002	Lynchburg Hillcats	3–1	Kinston Indians
2003	Winston-Salem Warthogs	3–0	Lynchburg Hillcats
2004	Kinston Indians	3–2	Wilmington Blue Rocks
2005	Frederick Keys	3–2	Kinston Indians
2006	Kinston Indians	3–0	Frederick Keys
2007	Frederick Keys	3–1	Salem Avalanche
2008	Potomac Nationals	3–1	Myrtle Beach Pelicans
2009	Lynchburg Hillcats	3–0	Salem Red Sox
2010	Potomac Nationals	3–1	Winston-Salem Dash
2011	Frederick Keys	3–1	Kinston Indians
2012	Lynchburg Hillcats	3–1	Winston-Salem Dash
2013	Salem Red Sox	3–0	Potomac Nationals
2014	Potomac Nationals	3–1	Myrtle Beach Pelicans
2015	Myrtle Beach Pelicans	3–0	Wilmington Blue Rocks
2016	Myrtle Beach Pelicans	3–1	Lynchburg Hillcats
2017^{[b]}	Down East Wood Ducks; Lynchburg Hillcats	—	—
2018^{[c]}	Buies Creek Astros	1–0	Potomac Nationals
2019	Wilmington Blue Rocks	3–2	Fayetteville Woodpeckers
2020	None (season cancelled due to COVID-19 pandemic)		
2021	Charleston RiverDogs	3–2	Down East Wood Ducks
2022	Charleston RiverDogs	2–0	Lynchburg Hillcats
2023	Charleston RiverDogs	2–0	Down East Wood Ducks
2024	Fredericksburg Nationals	2–1	Kannapolis Cannon Ballers
2025	Lynchburg Hillcats	2–1	Columbia Fireflies
2026	Fayetteville Woodpeckers	2–0	Charleston River Dogs

== Championship wins by team ==
Wins	Runner-ups	Team	Championship years	Runner-up years
11	6	Winston-Salem Dash/Cards/Red Sox/Pirates/Spirits/Warthogs	1950, 1951, 1964, 1970, 1973, 1976, 1979, 1985, 1986, 1993, 2003	1966, 1983, 1994, 1998, 2010, 2012
9	11	Lynchburg Red Sox/Twins/Mets/Hillcats	1978, 1983, 1984, 1997, 2002, 2009, 2012, 2017, 2025	1973, 1977, 1985, 1988, 1991, 1992, 1999, 2000, 2003, 2016, 2022
6	8	Kinston Eagles/Indians	1962, 1988, 1991, 1995, 2004, 2006	1971, 1987, 1990, 1996, 1997, 2002, 2005, 2011
5	2	Salem Pirates/Buccaneers/Avalanche/Red Sox	1972, 1974, 1987, 2001, 2013	2007, 2009
5	5	Wilmington Blue Rocks	1994, 1996, 1998, 1999, 2019	1993, 1995, 2001, 2004, 2015
4	2	Myrtle Beach Pelicans	1999, 2000, 2015, 2016	2008, 2014
4	2	Prince William Yankees/Potomac Nationals	1989, 2008, 2010, 2014	2013, 2018
4	2	Peninsula Phillies/Pilots	1971, 1977, 1980, 1992	1978, 1981
4	1	Frederick Keys	1990, 2005, 2007, 2011	2006
3	1	Danville Leafs	1945, 1953, 1955	1956
3	1	Charleston RiverDogs	2021, 2022, 2023	2026
3	0	Wilson Tobs	1959, 1961, 1963	—
2	9	Durham Bulls	1957, 1967	1946, 1947, 1952, 1962, 1965, 1980, 1982, 1984, 1989
2	7	Burlington Rangers/Indians/Senators/Pirates/Bees	1949, 1958	1948, 1950, 1954, 1960, 1969, 1970, 1972
2	3	Raleigh Capitals	1946, 1947	1945, 1949, 1959
2	0	Rocky Mount Leafs/Phillies	1966, 1975	—
2	0	Fayetteville Highlanders	1954, 1956	—
1	2	High Point-Thomasville Hi-Toms	1968	1955, 1957
1	2	Tidewater Tides	1965	1964, 1967
1	2	Greensboro Yankees	1960	1958, 1963
1	2	Reidsville Luckies	1952	1951, 1953
1	2	Down East Wood Ducks	2017	2021, 2023
1	1	Fayetteville Woodpeckers	2026	2019
1	1	Hagerstown Suns	1981	1986
1	1	Raleigh-Durham Phillies/Mets	1969	1968
1	0	Buies Creek Astros	2018	—
1	0	Alexandria Dukes	1982	—
1	0	Martinsville Athletics	1948	—
1	0	Fredericksburg Nationals	2024	—
0	1	Columbia Fireflies	—	2025
0	1	Kannapolis Cannon Ballers	—	2024

== Notes ==
- ^{a} Myrtle Beach and Wilmington were declared co-champions when the series was tied 2–2 and canceled because of the threat of Hurricane Floyd.
- ^{b} Down East and Lynchburg were declared co-champions as a result of the playoffs being called off because of the threat of Hurricane Irma.
- ^{c} The best-of-five championship series was shortened to a one-game final due to the threat of Hurricane Florence.
