= 1975 Carolina League season =

- League: Carolina League
- Sport: Baseball
- Duration: April 11 – August 28
- Number of games: 144
- Number of teams: 4

Regular season
- Season MVP: Luther Wrenn, Salem Pirates

Playoffs
- League champions: Rocky Mount Phillies

CL seasons
- ← 1974 1976 →

The 1975 Carolina League was a Class A baseball season played between April 11 and August 28. Four teams played a 144-game schedule, with the top team in each half of the season competing for the championship.

The Rocky Mount Phillies won the Carolina League championship, as they finished in first place in both halves of the season.

== League changes ==
- The Carolina League played an interlocking schedule with the Western Carolinas League.

== Team changes ==
- The Kinston Expos fold.
- The Peninsula Pennants fold.
- The Lynchburg Twins ended their affiliation with the Minnesota Twins begin a new affiliation with the Texas Rangers. The team is renamed the Lynchburg Rangers.

== Teams ==
1975 Carolina League
Team	City	MLB Affiliate	Stadium
Lynchburg Rangers	Lynchburg, Virginia	Texas Rangers	City Stadium
Rocky Mount Phillies	Rocky Mount, North Carolina	Philadelphia Phillies	Municipal Stadium
Salem Pirates	Salem, Virginia	Pittsburgh Pirates	Salem Municipal Field
Winston-Salem Red Sox	Winston-Salem, North Carolina	Boston Red Sox	Ernie Shore Field

== Map of teams ==
Carolina League teams

== Regular season ==
=== Summary ===
- The Rocky Mount Phillies finished with the best record in the league for the first time in team history.

=== Standings ===
Carolina League
Team	Win	Loss	%	GB
Rocky Mount Phillies	91	51	.641	–
Winston-Salem Red Sox	81	62	.566	10.5
Salem Pirates	74	66	.529	16
Lynchburg Rangers	60	78	.435	29

== League Leaders ==
=== Batting leaders ===
Stat	Player	Total
AVG	Ted Cox, Winston-Salem Red Sox	.305
H	Ted Cox, Winston-Salem Red Sox	154
R	Jim Morrison, Rocky Mount Phillies	98
2B	John Hughes, Rocky Mount Phillies	30
3B	Alberto Lois, Salem Pirates; Bobby Thompson, Lynchburg Rangers	10
HR	Jim Morrison, Rocky Mount Phillies	20
RBI	Luther Wrenn, Salem Pirates	97
SB	Bobby Thompson, Lynchburg Rangers	65

=== Pitching leaders ===
Stat	Player	Total
W	Oliver Bell, Rocky Mount Phillies; Warren Brusstar, Rocky Mount Phillies; Allen Ripley, Winston-Salem Red Sox	14
ERA	Rick Jones, Winston-Salem Red Sox	2.11
CG	Rick Jones, Winston-Salem Red Sox; Allen Ripley, Winston-Salem Red Sox	14
SV	Bobby Cuellar, Lynchburg Rangers	17
SO	Burke Suter, Winston-Salem Red Sox	150
IP	Allen Ripley, Winston-Salem Red Sox	186.0

== Playoffs ==
- The Rocky Mount Phillies won their first Carolina League championship, as they won both halves of the regular season.

== Awards ==
Carolina League awards
Award name	Recipient
Most Valuable Player	Luther Wrenn, Salem Pirates
Manager of the Year	Cal Emery, Rocky Mount Phillies

== See also ==
- 1975 Major League Baseball season
