= 1973 Carolina League season =

- League: Carolina League
- Sport: Baseball
- Duration: April 13 – August 29
- Number of games: 140
- Number of teams: 6

Regular season
- Season MVP: Terry Whitfield, Kinston Eagles

Playoffs
- League champions: Winston-Salem Red Sox
- Runners-up: Lynchburg Twins

CL seasons
- ← 1972 1974 →

The 1973 Carolina League was a Class A baseball season played between April 13 and August 29. Six teams played a 140-game schedule, with the top team in each half of the season competing for the championship.

The Winston-Salem Red Sox won the Carolina League championship, defeating the Lynchburg Twins in the final round of the playoffs.

== Team changes ==
- The Burlington Rangers fold.
- The Wilson Pennants join the league.
- The Kinston Eagles ended their affiliation with the New York Yankees.
- The Rocky Mount Leafs ended their affiliation with the Detroit Tigers and begin a new affiliation with the Philadelphia Phillies. The club is renamed the Rocky Mount Phillies.

== Teams ==
1973 Carolina League
Team	City	MLB Affiliate	Stadium
Kinston Eagles	Kinston, North Carolina	None	Grainger Stadium
Lynchburg Twins	Lynchburg, Virginia	Minnesota Twins	City Stadium
Rocky Mount Phillies	Rocky Mount, North Carolina	Philadelphia Phillies	Municipal Stadium
Salem Pirates	Salem, Virginia	Pittsburgh Pirates	Salem Municipal Field
Wilson Pennants	Wilson, North Carolina	None	Fleming Stadium
Winston-Salem Red Sox	Winston-Salem, North Carolina	Boston Red Sox	Ernie Shore Field

== Map of teams ==
Carolina League teams

== Regular season ==
=== Summary ===
- The Lynchburg Twins finished with the best record in the league for the first time in franchise history.

=== Standings ===
Carolina League
Team	Win	Loss	%	GB
Lynchburg Twins	78	60	.565	–
Winston-Salem Red Sox	77	62	.554	1.5
Rocky Mount Phillies	75	65	.536	4
Kinston Eagles	68	69	.496	9.5
Salem Pirates	66	72	.478	12
Wilson Pennants	52	88	.371	27

== League Leaders ==
=== Batting leaders ===
Stat	Player	Total
AVG	Terry Whitfield, Kinston Eagles	.335
H	Craig Reynolds, Salem Pirates	160
R	Omar Moreno, Salem Pirates	112
2B	Jeffrey Geach, Kinston Eagles	34
3B	Dale Soderholm, Lynchburg Twins	12
HR	Jim Obradovich, Lynchburg Twins; Terry Whitfield, Kinston Eagles	18
RBI	Chuck Erickson, Winston-Salem Red Sox	101
SB	Omar Moreno, Salem Pirates	77

=== Pitching leaders ===
Stat	Player	Total
W	Bill Stiegemeier, Lynchburg Twins; Roy Thomas, Rocky Mount Phillies	15
ERA	Roy Thomas, Rocky Mount Phillies	2.24
CG	Larry Demery, Salem Pirates	14
SV	Tippy Martinez, Kinston Eagles; Barry Sbragia, Winston-Salem Red Sox	15
SO	Roy Thomas, Rocky Mount Phillies	193
IP	Quencey Hill, Rocky Mount Phillies	203.0

== Playoffs ==
- The Winston-Salem Red Sox won their fifth Carolina League championship, defeating the Lynchburg Twins in five games.
- The championship round was extended from a best-of-three series to a best-of-five series.

=== Playoff bracket ===
Finals
1	Lynchburg	2
2	Winston-Salem	3

== Awards ==
Carolina League awards
Award name	Recipient
Most Valuable Player	Terry Whitfield, Kinston Eagles
Manager of the Year	Dick Phillips, Lynchburg Twins

== See also ==
- 1973 Major League Baseball season
