= 1968 Carolina League season =

- League: Carolina League
- Sport: Baseball
- Duration: April 14 – September 2
- Number of games: 140
- Number of teams: 12

Regular season
- Season MVP: Tony Solaita, High Point-Thomasville Hi-Toms

Playoffs
- League champions: High Point-Thomasville Hi-Toms
- Runners-up: Raleigh-Durham Mets

CL seasons
- ← 1967 1969 →

The 1968 Carolina League was a Class A baseball season played between April 14 and September 2. Twelve teams played a 140-game schedule, with the top four teams in each division qualifying for the post-season.

The High Point-Thomasville Hi-Toms won the Carolina League championship, defeating the Raleigh-Durham Mets in the final round of the playoffs.

== Team changes ==
- The Asheville Tourists leave the league and rejoin the Southern League.
- The Durham Bulls merge with the Raleigh Pirates and are renamed the Raleigh-Durham Mets. The club is affiliated with the New York Mets.
- The High Point-Thomasville Hi-Toms join the league from the Western Carolinas League.
- The Salem Rebels join the league from the Appalachian League. The team was affiliated with the Pittsburgh Pirates.
- The Greensboro Yankees ended their affiliation with the New York Yankees and began a new affiliation with the Houston Astros. The club was renamed the Greensboro Patriots.
- The Kinston Eagles ended their affiliation with the Atlanta Braves and began a new affiliation with the New York Yankees.

== Teams ==
1968 Carolina League
| Division | Team | City | MLB Affiliate | Stadium |
| East | Kinston Eagles | Kinston, North Carolina | New York Yankees | Grainger Stadium |
| East | Peninsula Grays | Hampton, Virginia | Oakland Athletics | War Memorial Stadium |
| East | Raleigh-Durham Mets | Raleigh, North Carolina | New York Mets | Devereaux Meadow |
| East | Rocky Mount Leafs | Rocky Mount, North Carolina | Detroit Tigers | Municipal Stadium |
| East | Tidewater Tides | Norfolk, Virginia | Philadelphia Phillies | Frank D. Lawrence Stadium |
| East | Wilson Tobs | Wilson, North Carolina | Minnesota Twins | Fleming Stadium |
| West | Burlington Senators | Burlington, North Carolina | Washington Senators | Burlington Athletic Stadium |
| West | Greensboro Patriots | Greensboro, North Carolina | Houston Astros | World War Memorial Stadium |
| West | High Point-Thomasville Hi-Toms | Thomasville, North Carolina | None | Finch Field |
| West | Lynchburg White Sox | Lynchburg, Virginia | Chicago White Sox | City Stadium |
| West | Salem Rebels | Salem, Virginia | Pittsburgh Pirates | Salem Municipal Field |
| West | Winston-Salem Red Sox | Winston-Salem, North Carolina | Boston Red Sox | Ernie Shore Field |

== Map of teams ==
East division West division

== Regular season ==
=== Summary ===
- The Salem Rebels finished with the best record in the league in their first season.

=== Standings ===
East division
| Team | Win | Loss | % | GB |
|---|---|---|---|---|
| Raleigh-Durham Mets | 83 | 56 | .597 | – |
| Tidewater Tides | 80 | 60 | .571 | 3.5 |
| Peninsula Grays | 75 | 65 | .536 | 8.5 |
| Wilson Tobs | 71 | 68 | .511 | 12 |
| Rocky Mount Leafs | 70 | 70 | .500 | 13.5 |
| Kinston Eagles | 62 | 75 | .453 | 20 |
West division
| Salem Rebels | 85 | 55 | .607 | – |
| High Point-Thomasville Hi-Toms | 69 | 71 | .493 | 16 |
| Lynchburg White Sox | 68 | 72 | .486 | 17 |
| Greensboro Patriots | 61 | 79 | .436 | 24 |
| Winston-Salem Red Sox | 56 | 81 | .409 | 27.5 |
| Burlington Senators | 56 | 84 | .400 | 29 |

== League Leaders ==
=== Batting leaders ===
| Stat | Player | Total |
|---|---|---|
| AVG | Carlos May, Lynchburg White Sox | .330 |
| H | Johnny Jeter, Salem Rebels | 156 |
| R | Lee Green, High Point-Thomasville Hi-Toms; Tony Solaita, High Point-Thomasville Hi-Toms | 106 |
| 2B | John Mason, Winston-Salem Red Sox | 25 |
| 3B | Dave Arrington, Salem Rebels | 17 |
| HR | Tony Solaita, High Point-Thomasville Hi-Toms | 49 |
| RBI | Tony Solaita, High Point-Thomasville Hi-Toms | 122 |
| SB | Wilbert Hammond, Salem Rebels | 39 |

=== Pitching leaders ===
| Stat | Player | Total |
|---|---|---|
| W | Jerry Cram, Wilson Tobs; Charlie Hudson, Raleigh-Durham Mets; Eddie Smith, Lynchburg White Sox | 16 |
| ERA | Greg Conger, Peninsula Grays | 1.76 |
| CG | Jerry Cram, Wilson Tobs; Jerry Magness, Wilson Tobs; Ed Phillips, Winston-Salem Red Sox; Dick Such, Burlington Senators | 14 |
| SHO | Charlie Hudson, Raleigh-Durham Mets | 6 |
| SO | Al Fitzmorris, Lynchburg White Sox | 214 |
| IP | Eddie Smith, Lynchburg White Sox | 215.0 |

== Playoffs ==
- The High Point-Thomasville Hi-Toms won their first Carolina League championship, defeating the Raleigh-Durham Mets in two games.

=== Playoff bracket ===
Quarter-finals
E1 | Raleigh-Durham | 1
E3 | Peninsula | 0
E2 | Tidewater | 0
E4 | Wilson | 1
W1 | Salem | 0
W3 | Lynchburg | 1
W2 | High Point-Thomasville | 1
W4 | Greensboro | 0

Semi-finals
E1 | Raleigh-Durham | 2
E4 | Wilson | 1
W3 | Lynchburg | 0
W2 | High Point-Thomasville | 2

Finals
E1 | Raleigh-Durham | 0
W2 | High Point-Thomasville | 2

== Awards ==
Carolina League awards
| Award name | Recipient |
|---|---|
| Most Valuable Player | Tony Solaita, High Point-Thomasville Hi-Toms |
| Manager of the Year | Don Hoak, Salem Rebels |

== See also ==
- 1968 Major League Baseball season
