= 1977 Carolina League season =

- League: Carolina League
- Sport: Baseball
- Duration: April 15 – September 1
- Games: 140
- Teams: 4

Regular season
- Season MVP: Oswaldo Olivares, Salem Pirates

Playoffs
- League champions: Peninsula Pilots
- Runners-up: Lynchburg Mets

CL seasons
- ← 1976 1978 →

The 1977 Carolina League was a Class A baseball season played between April 15 and September 1. Four teams played a 140-game schedule, with the top team in each half of the season competing for the championship.

The Peninsula Pilots won the Carolina League championship, as they defeated the Lynchburg Mets in the final round of the post-season.

== Teams ==
1977 Carolina League
| Team | City | MLB Affiliate | Stadium |
| Lynchburg Mets | Lynchburg, Virginia | New York Mets | City Stadium |
| Peninsula Pilots | Hampton, Virginia | Philadelphia Phillies | War Memorial Stadium |
| Salem Pirates | Salem, Virginia | Pittsburgh Pirates | Salem Municipal Field |
| Winston-Salem Red Sox | Winston-Salem, North Carolina | Boston Red Sox | Ernie Shore Field |

== Map of teams ==
Carolina League teams

== Regular season ==
=== Summary ===
- The Lynchburg Mets finished with the best record in the league for the first time in franchise history.

=== Standings ===
Carolina League
| Team | Win | Loss | % | GB |
|---|---|---|---|---|
| Lynchburg Mets | 78 | 60 | .565 | – |
| Peninsula Pilots | 71 | 67 | .514 | 7 |
| Salem Pirates | 66 | 72 | .478 | 12 |
| Winston-Salem Red Sox | 61 | 77 | .442 | 17 |

== League Leaders ==
=== Batting leaders ===
| Stat | Player | Total |
|---|---|---|
| AVG | Oswaldo Olivares, Salem Pirates | .370 |
| H | Oswaldo Olivares, Salem Pirates | 208 |
| R | Oswaldo Olivares, Salem Pirates | 121 |
| 2B | John Hughes, Peninsula Pilots | 33 |
| 3B | Oswaldo Olivares, Salem Pirates | 14 |
| HR | John Hughes, Peninsula Pilots | 22 |
| RBI | Eugenio Cotes, Salem Pirates | 102 |
| SB | Oswaldo Olivares, Salem Pirates | 46 |

=== Pitching leaders ===
| Stat | Player | Total |
|---|---|---|
| W | Jeff Schneider, Peninsula Pilots | 15 |
| ERA | Jeff Schneider, Peninsula Pilots | 2.50 |
| CG | Neil Allen, Lynchburg Mets; Rafael Vásquez | 11 |
| SV | Jeff Schneider, Peninsula Pilots | 22 |
| SO | Neil Allen, Lynchburg Mets | 126 |
| IP | Dickie Noles, Peninsula Pilots | 199.0 |

== Playoffs ==
- The Peninsula Pilots won their second Carolina League championship, defeating the Lynchburg Mets in five games.
- The final series was a best-of-five series.

=== Playoff bracket ===
| Finals |
| 1 | Lynchburg | 2 |
| 2 | Peninsula | 3 |

== Awards ==
Carolina League awards
| Award name | Recipient |
|---|---|
| Most Valuable Player | Oswaldo Olivares, Salem Pirates |
| Manager of the Year | Jack Aker, Lynchburg Mets |

== See also ==
- 1977 Major League Baseball season
