= Durham Bulls =

Minor League Baseball team in Durham, North Carolina

- Founded in 1902; Durham, North Carolina

| Team logo | Cap insignia |

Minor league affiliations
- Class: Triple-A (1998–present)
- Previous classes: Class A-Advanced (1990–1997); Class A (1963–1971, 1980–1989); Class B (1949–1962); Class C (1945–1948); Class B (1932–1933, 1936–1943); Class C (1921–1931); Class D (1913–1917, 1920); Class C (1902)
- League: International League (1998–present)
- Division: East Division
- Previous leagues: Carolina League (1945–1971, 1980–1997); Piedmont League (1920–1933, 1936–1943); North Carolina State League (1913–1917); North Carolina League (1902)

Major league affiliations
- Team: Tampa Bay Devil Rays/Rays (1998–present)
- Previous teams: Atlanta Braves (1980–1997); Philadelphia Phillies (1969); New York Mets (1967–1968); Houston Colt .45s/Astros (1962–1966); Detroit Tigers (1948–1961); Independent (1947); Boston Red Sox (1945–1946); Brooklyn Dodgers (1941–1943); Cincinnati Reds (1936–1940); New York Yankees (1933); Philadelphia Phillies (1932); Independent (1902, 1913–1917, 1920–1931)

Minor league titles
- Class titles (4): 2009; 2017; 2021; 2022
- League titles (17): 1922; 1924; 1925; 1930; 1940; 1941; 1957; 1967; 1969; 2002; 2003; 2009; 2013; 2017; 2018; 2021; 2022
- Division titles (23): 1965; 1967; 1968; 1980; 1982; 1984; 1989; 1998; 1999; 2000; 2002; 2003; 2007; 2008; 2009; 2010; 2011; 2013; 2014; 2017; 2018; 2021; 2022
- First-half titles (7): 1925; 1957; 1980; 1982; 1984; 1989; 1996
- Second-half titles (6): 1922; 1926; 1980; 1989; 1994; 2023
- Wild card berths (2): 2004; 2019

Team data
- Name: Durham Bulls (1980–present)
- Previous names: Raleigh-Durham Triangles (1970–1971); Raleigh-Durham Phillies (1969); Raleigh-Durham Mets (1968); Durham Bulls (1913–1917, 1920–1933, 1936–1943, 1945–1967); Durham Tobacconists (1902)
- Colors: Blue, burnt orange, black, white
- Mascots: Wool E. Bull
- Ballpark: Durham Bulls Athletic Park (1995–present)
- Previous parks: Durham Athletic Park (1926–1994); Devereaux Meadow (1968–1971); Hanes Field (1913–1925); Trinity College (1902)
- Owner/ Operator: Capitol Broadcasting Company
- General manager: Tyler Parsons
- Manager: Morgan Ensberg
- Website: milb.com/durham

The Durham Bulls are a Minor League Baseball team of the International League and the Triple-A affiliate of the Tampa Bay Rays. They are located in Durham, North Carolina, and play their home games at Durham Bulls Athletic Park, which opened in 1995.

Established as the Durham Tobacconists in the North Carolina League in 1902, the team subsequently disbanded and restarted numerous times. After a 10-year hiatus, it was reestablished as the Durham Bulls and played in the North Carolina State League from 1913 to 1917. The Bulls were members of the Piedmont League from 1920 to 1933 and for a second time from 1936 to 1943. Durham competed in the Carolina League from 1945 to 1971. For the latter part of this stretch, they merged with a team from Raleigh, becoming the Raleigh-Durham Mets (1968), Raleigh-Durham Phillies (1969), and Raleigh-Durham Triangles (1970–1971). The Durham Bulls returned as members of the Carolina League in 1980. They were replaced by an International League team in 1998. In conjunction with Major League Baseball's (MLB) reorganization of the minors in 2021, they were placed in the Triple-A East, but this was renamed the International League in 2022.

Durham has won 17 league championships. They won the Piedmont League championship six times (1922, 1924, 1925, 1930, 1940, and 1941). Though not affiliated with any MLB team for the first four, the Bulls were a farm club for the Cincinnati Reds and Brooklyn Dodgers, respectively, for the last two. They won the Carolina League championship on three occasions: in 1957 with the Detroit Tigers, 1967 with the New York Mets, and 1969 with the Philadelphia Phillies. The Bulls have won the International League championship eight times (2002, 2003, 2009, 2013, 2017, 2018, 2021, and 2022), all as an affiliate of the Tampa Bay Rays. Durham has gone on to win three Triple-A National Championship Games (2009, 2017, and 2022).

The 1988 film Bull Durham, starring Kevin Costner, Tim Robbins, and Susan Sarandon, featured the Bulls and Durham Athletic Park, the team's stadium at the time. Most of the filming was done at the ballpark following the end of the 1987 season.

== History ==
=== Early years (1902–1926) ===
The Bulls were founded in 1902 as the Durham Tobacconists. The official date when the franchise formed was March 18. William G. Bramham, later President of the National Association of Professional Baseball Leagues (Minor League Baseball), was the first owner. The Tobacconists took the field for the first time on April 24 in an exhibition game against Trinity College. Their first game in the North Carolina League was at Charlotte on May 5 against the Hornets, and their first home game was against the New Bern Truckers on May 12. The league, however, folded in July, not having played a full season.

In December 1912, the Durham Tobacconists re-formed as the Durham Bulls in the North Carolina State League. Their first game was on April 24, 1913, at Hanes Field on the Trinity College campus (now the East Campus of Duke University). They defeated the Raleigh Capitals 7–4. On May 30, 1917, however, the North Carolina State League folded due to America's joining of the Allied Powers during World War I. The Bulls were declared league champions, even though the season was shortened to only 36 games.

On October 31, 1919, the Bulls joined the Piedmont League, a minor league with clubs scattered around Virginia and North Carolina. Seven years later, in 1926, the team moved from Hanes Field to El Toro Park. The park was dedicated on July 26 by the Commissioner of Baseball Kenesaw Mountain Landis, who put on a show by riding a real bull, the team mascot, onto the playing field.

=== Durham Athletic Park and the Carolina League (1932–1957) ===
Six years later, in 1932, the team became affiliated with the National League's Philadelphia Phillies, the first of ten teams that the Bulls have been affiliated with. The next year, the city of Durham purchased El Toro Park, renaming it the Durham Athletic Park after the 1933 season. The Bulls were unable to operate for the 1934 and 1935 seasons due to the Great Depression. Meanwhile, a team from Wilmington, North Carolina who also played in the Piedmont League and was a Cincinnati Reds affiliate called the Wilmington Pirates relocated to Durham and was going to replace the Bulls. The Bulls franchise, however, was re-activated by having the operations of the Wilmington ball club integrated into the Bulls. The Reds then switched affiliations from the former Wilmington ball club to the Bulls and the Bulls continued as the same franchise. On the evening of June 17, 1939, the Durham Athletic Park burned to the ground hours after the Bulls defeated the Portsmouth Cubs 7–3. The groundskeeper, Walter Williams, who was asleep under the grandstand when the blaze began, was able to escape though the fire nearly killed him. Damage costs were more than $100,000. In a remarkable two-week turnaround, Durham Athletic Park was functioning again by July 2, with the old wooden grandstand replaced by concrete and steel. Temporary bleachers were also added and seated 1,000. The crowd that day saw the Bulls beat the Charlotte Hornets 11–4.

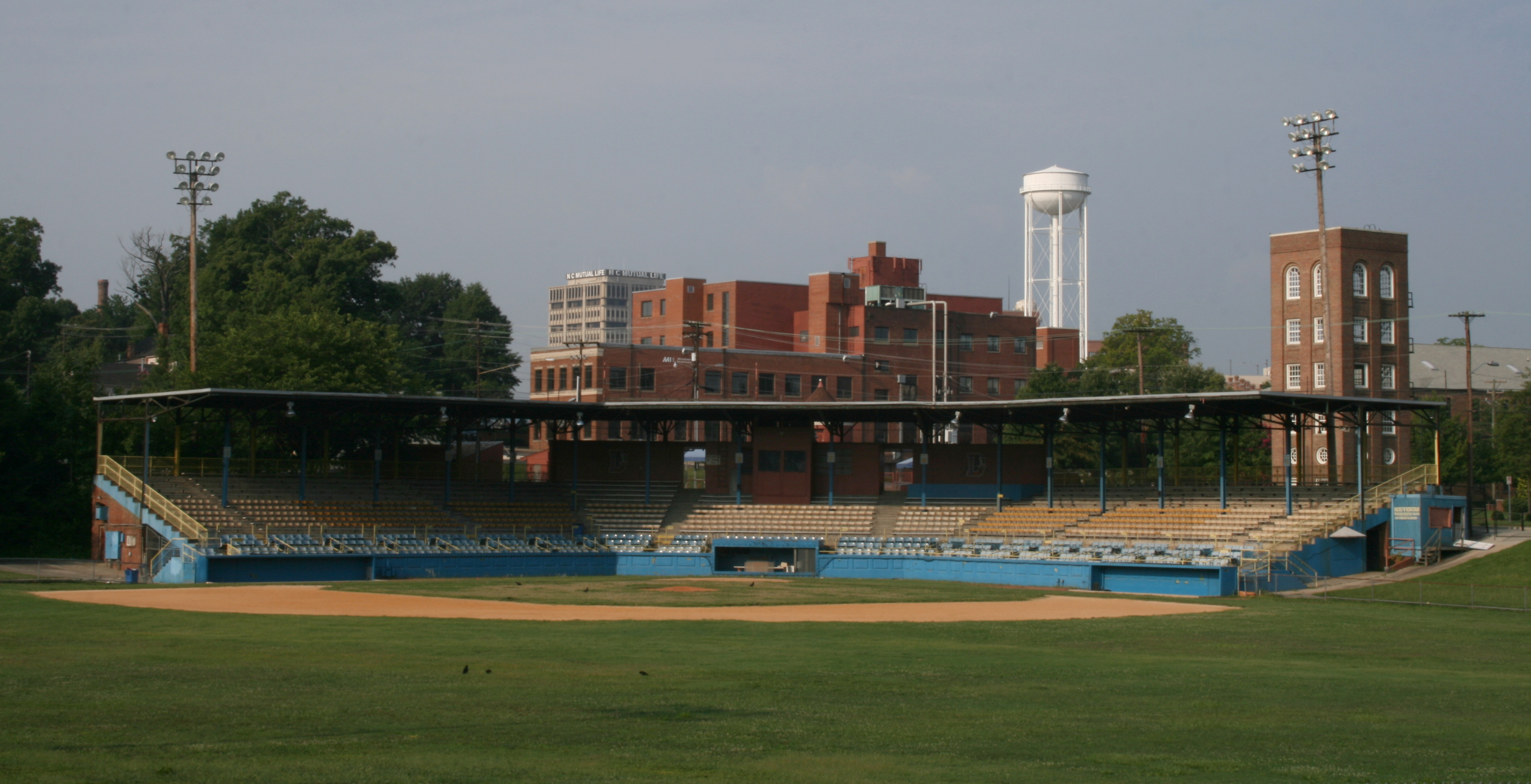
Durham Athletic Park in 2008

A new Durham Athletic Park was finally completed in April 1940, in time for an exhibition game between the Cincinnati Reds and Boston Red Sox, which attracted 5,574 fans. Only 1,587 turned out ten days later for the Bulls' first game of the season. On September 5, 1943, the last-place Bulls played their last Piedmont League game, beating Richmond 15–5. The following year, the Piedmont League became an all-Virginia league, and there was no baseball in Durham in 1944. In 1945, a second Carolina League formed. On April 27 the reactivated Bulls played their first game in the new league, defeating the Burlington Bees 5–0. Three years later, in September 1948, Tom Wright, a former Bulls outfielder, became the first Carolina League player to make it to the majors when he debuted with the Boston Red Sox. Three years after that, the Bulls helped make history when their 5–4 loss to the Danville Leafs featured the first black player in Carolina League history, Percy Miller Jr., who played for the Leafs. It would not be until April 18, 1957, that the Bulls fielded African-American players, when third baseman Bubba Morton and pitcher Ted Richardson took the field in a loss to Greensboro. That season also saw the first Carolina League All-Star game played in Durham.

=== Raleigh-Durham era (1967–1980) ===
In 1967, the Bulls became a New York Mets affiliate. One year later, the Bulls were renamed the Raleigh-Durham Mets. The franchise was renamed because the Bulls acquired the nearby Raleigh Pirates and merged with them. The team still maintained their affiliation with the Mets, playing half of their home games at Durham Athletic Park and half at Devereaux Meadow in Raleigh. The team switched affiliations from the Mets to the Philadelphia Phillies and were renamed the Raleigh-Durham Phillies for the 1969 season. The team hadn't been affiliated with the Phillies since the 1932 season. The Phillies abandoned the franchise and the team became independent, renaming themselves the Raleigh-Durham Triangles for the 1970 season. The team played as the Triangles from 1970 to 1971 and remained independent for both seasons. The franchise disbanded again before the 1972 season, and baseball would not return to Durham until 1980. Also, minor league baseball in Raleigh ended for good. For the 1980 season, the Raleigh-Durham Triangles were reformed and renamed back to the Durham Bulls. On June 22 of that same year, the local CBS affiliate, then WTVD in Durham, broadcast the Bulls game locally, the first time that the Bulls had ever been featured on television. The team also became an affiliate of the Atlanta Braves that season and would remain so until 1998.

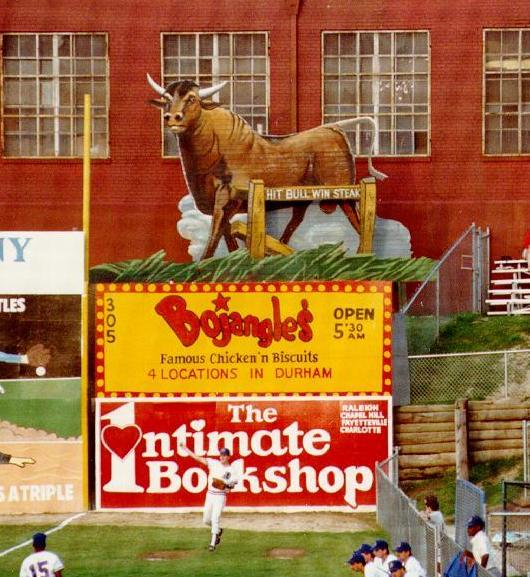
The old bull from Durham Athletic Park, added during the filming of Bull Durham

=== The Bull Durham years (1988–1994) ===
Team owner Miles Wolff began pushing for a new ballpark for the Bulls in 1988 in order to attract Triple-A baseball, but stadium plans were pushed back for years. When the film Bull Durham was released in mid-1988, it led to a major resurgence of local popular interest in the team and their ballpark. Both the real Bulls and their movie counterparts played in the High-A Carolina League in the late 1980s. On August 30, 1990, a crowd of 6,202 made the Bulls the first Class-A team in history to pass the 300,000 mark in attendance for a season.

The Bulls were sold to the Raleigh-based Capitol Broadcasting Company in 1991. Capitol president Jim Goodmon initially proposed building the new stadium near Raleigh-Durham International Airport, but after city leaders in Durham offered to renovate the old ballpark or help build a new stadium, the current downtown Durham site was secured. In July 1992, the Bulls unveiled their current mascot, Wool E. Bull, a moniker submitted by Durham resident Jim Vickery out of a pool of 500, inspired by the otherwise unrelated novelty song oldie, "Wooly Bully". The "E" in his name stands for "education." The next June, the Bulls retired the number 18 belonging to Joe Morgan, the first hall of famer to play for the Bulls, who was a member of the 1963 club (Chipper Jones, who played for the Bulls in 1992, was the second, elected in 2018). Morgan's number remained the only one retired by the club for many years; he attended the ceremony where his number was retired. The team also retained the snorting bull sign that was used in Bull Durham and it remained at Durham Athletic Park until both team and sign left after the 1994 season.

=== DBAP and Triple-A baseball (1995–2003) ===
Durham Bulls Athletic Park opened its doors in 1995, complete with a new snorting bull sign. The 1997 season was the final one in which the Bulls were an affiliate of the Atlanta Braves and also their last year in the High-A Carolina League. In 1998, the franchise moved two levels up to Triple-A and joined the International League (IL), in part because of their popularity as the main team in Bull Durham, and also because the Triple-A leagues needed two more teams to accommodate affiliates for the Major League Baseball expansion teams Tampa Bay Devil Rays and Arizona Diamondbacks. Wolff's dream of attracting Triple-A baseball came true when the Bulls became the Triple-A affiliate of the Tampa Bay Devil Rays (now Tampa Bay Rays), who have remained their parent club ever since. DBAP expanded its seating capacity due to the move. 1998 also saw the Bulls play their first game outside the United States when they played road games against the Ottawa Lynx (now the Lehigh Valley IronPigs), though it would be another year before they recorded their first win in Canada.

The Bulls' second appearance on film was in The Rookie, released in 2002. It starred Dennis Quaid as Jim Morris, a baseball pitcher who is now retired. The real Jim Morris did play for the Bulls briefly during the 1999 season and was then called up to the major leagues on September 18, 1999, at the age of 35. He made his debut against Royce Clayton of the Texas Rangers, striking him out on four pitches. Morris made four more appearances later that year. The 2001 season saw the Bulls set single-game (10,916 on July 23) and full-season (505,319 set on September 1) attendance records. The Bulls celebrated their 100th anniversary season in 2002. On September 12, 2002, the Bulls won their first IL championship, defeating the Buffalo Bisons 2-0 for the Governors' Cup. In 2003, Durham became the first club in the 119-year history of the championship to sweep back-to-back final playoff series, defeating the Pawtucket Red Sox.

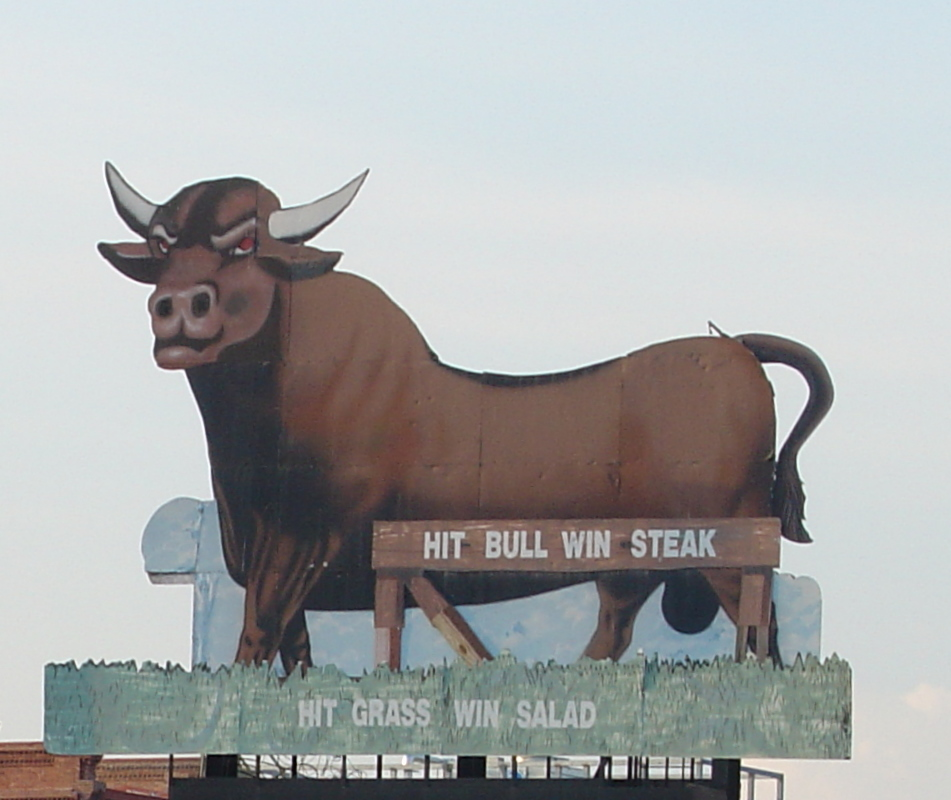
The second incarnation of the snorting bull sign (1995–2008)

=== Championships and success (2005–2015) ===
After missing the playoffs for the 2005 and 2006 seasons, the Bulls captured the 2007 South Division title with an 80–64 regular season record. Durham defeated the Toledo Mud Hens in a three-game sweep during the first round of the playoffs, but were defeated three games to two in the Governors' Cup Final by the Richmond Braves (now Gwinnett Braves). 2007 was also the first season of Charlie Montoyo as Bulls manager, replacing Bill Evers. In 2008, with a record of 74-70 the Bulls would once again win the South Division. After defeating the Louisville Bats three games to one in the first round, the Bulls again lost the championship, this time in four games to the Scranton/Wilkes-Barre Yankees.

In 2009, they won the division for a third consecutive season with an 83–61 record. Facing the Louisville Bats in the first round again, the Bulls were victorious, winning in five games. The third time was the charm for the Bulls in the Governors' Cup final, as they dethroned the Scranton/Wilkes-Barre Yankees in three games to win the championship, their third since joining the International League. The Bulls advanced to the Triple-A Baseball National Championship Game against the champions of the Pacific Coast League for the first time in team history, as that championship game did not exist at the time of the Bulls' previous two Governors' Cup championships. Facing the Memphis Redbirds, the Bulls would win their first class championship, scoring the winning run on a wild pitch in the bottom half of the 11th inning. Also in 2009, the Bulls retired the number 8 of Crash Davis, the main character of Bull Durham, which was their first number retirement in 16 years.

On August 19, 2010, the Bulls won their fourth straight division championship. Almost two weeks later, the Bulls set the Triple-A wins record winning their 84th game of the 2010 season. On August 2, 2011, the Bulls defeated the Charlotte Knights, the Chicago White Sox affiliate, 18-3 for their 6,000th win in franchise history. The team retired the number 20 of longtime general manager Bill Evers the following year. In 2013, the team won its fourth Governors' Cup title, defeating the Pawtucket Red Sox in the International League Final. The same year the number 10, belonging to former Bulls player Chipper Jones, was retired. Following a $20 million renovation to the DBAP, the Bulls hosted the 27th Triple-A All-Star Game on July 16, 2014, which saw the International League prevail 7–3 over the Pacific Coast League. Montoyo became the franchise's all-time winningest manager on July 21, earning his 614th victory to pass Evers. On August 31, 2014, the Bulls again broke their all-time paid attendance record, finishing the year with a cumulative mark of 533,033.

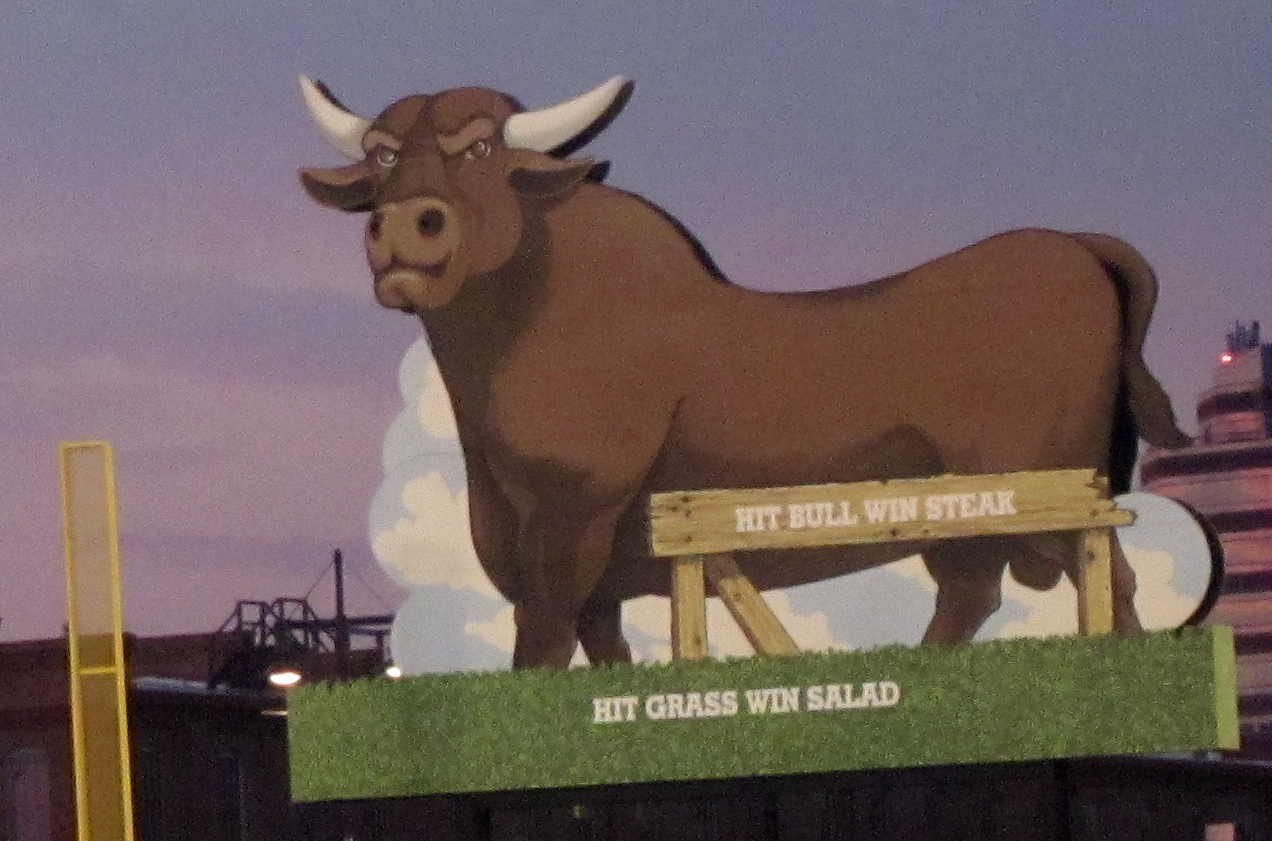
The third and current incarnation of the snorting bull sign (2008-Present)

=== Changes and a second championship (2015–2019) ===
Before the 2015 season, Jared Sandberg was named the fourth manager in the team's Triple-A history, replacing Montoyo. The 2015 season saw the Bulls set both a new single-game paid attendance record on July 4, and a new single-season paid attendance record, finishing with a cumulative mark of 554,788. In 2016, the Bulls had the franchise's second-highest attendance numbers and retired Montoyo's number 25. Overall, the team had their fourth losing season since 1998 and missed the playoffs. 2017 proved a watershed year for the Bulls, as they captured their first South Division championship since 2014 with an 86–56 record. The Bulls then won their second Triple-A National Championship, defeating the Memphis Redbirds after beating the Scranton/Wilkes-Barre RailRiders for their fifth Governors' Cup title. Success continued in 2018; the team went 79-60 and won their second straight South Division championship and Governor's Cup before falling to Memphis in the National Championship.

Sandberg left before the 2019 season for a position with the Seattle Mariners. The Bulls hired Brady Williams as their 5th Triple-A manager. The team finished 2019 with a 75–64 record, making the playoffs as a wild card, and advanced to the Governor's Cup before losing to Columbus. After the season, Baseball America named the Bulls the most successful MiLB franchise of the 2010s.

=== Lost season, reorganization, and more championships (2020–present) ===
As a consequence of the worldwide onset of the COVID-19 pandemic, Minor League Baseball announced on June 30, 2020, that no season would be held, meaning that the Durham Bulls would not take the field again until the following spring.

In conjunction with Major League Baseball's restructuring of Minor League Baseball in 2021, the Bulls were organized into the Triple-A East. In their first season in the league, the Bulls claimed the Triple-A East's championship with a 77–43 record. After the conclusion of the regular season, 10 games that had been postponed from the start of the season were reinserted into the schedule as a postseason tournament called the Triple-A Final Stretch in which all 30 Triple-A clubs competed for the highest winning percentage. Durham won the tournament with a 9–1 record. In 2022, the Triple-A East became known as the International League, the name historically used by the regional circuit prior to the 2021 reorganization, which the Bulls had been members of since their move up to Triple-A.

Manager Brady Williams led the 2022 Bulls to win the Eastern Division title with an 86–64 record. They then defeated the Nashville Sounds, winners of the Western Division, in a single playoff game, 13–0, to win the IL championship. Durham faced the Reno Aces for the Triple-A championship, winning 10–6.

Playing under a split-season format in 2023 in which the teams with the best league-wide records at the end of each half qualified for the playoffs, Durham won the second-half title at 48–27. Overall, the team posted the league's second-best record, 88–62. In a single round of playoffs for the IL championship versus the Norfolk Tides, winners of the first-half, the Bulls were defeated, two games to one.

== Season-by-season records ==
Key
| League | The team's final position in the league standings |
| Division | The team's final position in the divisional standings |
| GB | Games behind the team that finished in first place in the division that season |
| ‡ | Class champions (1998–present) |
| † | League champions (1902–present) |
| * | Division champions (1963–2022) |
| ^ | Postseason berth (1902–present) |

Season-by-season records
| Season | League | Regular-season | | | | | Postseason | | | MLB affiliate | Ref. |
| Season | League | Record | Win % | League | Division | GB | Record | Win % | Result | MLB affiliate | Ref. |
|---|---|---|---|---|---|---|---|---|---|---|---|
| 1902 | NCL | 23–39 | .371 | 4th | — | 12 1/2 | — | — | Result | — | Unaffiliated |
| 1913 | NCSL | 65–49 | .570 | 2nd | — | 1/2 | — | — | — | Unaffiliated | |
| 1914 | NCSL | 70–50 | .583 | 3rd | — | 1 1/2 | — | — | — | Unaffiliated | |
| 1915 | NCSL | 69–52 | .570 | 2nd | — | 5 1/2 | — | — | — | Unaffiliated | |
| 1916 | NCSL | 62–51 | .549 | 3rd | — | 6 1/2 | — | — | — | Unaffiliated | |
| 1917 (Note: The league disbanded after the games of May 30, 1917, due to the start of World War I. Durham was in first place at the time, making them the de facto champions.) | NCSL | 24–12 | .667 | 1st | — | — | — | — | — | Unaffiliated | |
| 1920 | PL | 53–65 | .449 | 6th | — | 15 | — | — | — | Unaffiliated | |
| 1921 | PL | 57–64 | .471 | 5th | — | 11 1/2 | — | — | — | Unaffiliated | |
| 1922^ † | PL | 69–58 | .543 | 2nd | — | 2 | 4–3 | .571 | Won second-half title Won PL championship vs. High Point Furniture Makers, 4–3 | Unaffiliated | |
| 1923 | PL | 49–74 | .398 | 6th | — | 24 1/2 | — | — | — | Unaffiliated | |
| 1924 † | PL | 74–46 | .617 | 1st | — | — | — | — | Won PL championship | Unaffiliated | |
| 1925^ † | PL | 68–58 | .540 | 2nd | — | 9 | 4–3 | .571 | Won first-half title Won PL championship vs. Winston-Salem Twins, 4–3 | Unaffiliated | |
| 1926^ | PL | 73–71 | .507 | 3rd | — | 12 | 1–4 | .200 | Won second-half title Lost PL championship vs. Greensboro Patriots, 4–1 | Unaffiliated | |
| 1927 | PL | 48–95 | .336 | 6th | — | 35 1/2 | — | — | — | Unaffiliated | |
| 1928 | PL | 40–91 | .305 | 6th | — | 41 | — | — | — | Unaffiliated | |
| 1929^ | PL | 85–51 | .625 | 1st | — | — | 1–4 | .200 | Lost PL championship vs. Greensboro Patriots, 4–1 | Unaffiliated | |
| 1930^ † | PL | 71–68 | .611 | 2nd | — | 6 | 4–3 | .571 | Won PL championship vs. Henderson Gamecocks, 4–3 | Unaffiliated | |
| 1931 | PL | 56–72 | .438 | 5th | — | 39 1/2 | — | — | — | Unaffiliated | |
| 1932 | PL | 56–77 | .421 | 6th | — | 24 | — | — | — | Philadelphia Phillies | |
| 1933 | PL | 65–76 | .461 | 5th | — | 26 1/2 | — | — | — | New York Yankees | |
| 1936^ | PL | 79–63 | .625 | 2nd | — | 13 1/2 | 3–4 | .429 | Won semifinals vs. Rocky Mount Red Sox, 3–1; Lost PL championship vs. Norfolk Tars, 3–0 | Cincinnati Reds | |
| 1937 | PL | 68–69 | .496 | 5th | — | 20 | — | — | — | Cincinnati Reds | |
| 1938 | PL | 64–71 | .474 | 6th | — | 19 1/2 | — | — | — | Cincinnati Reds | |
| 1939^ | PL | 75–65 | .536 | 2nd | — | 12 | 1–3 | .250 | Lost semifinals vs. Rocky Mount Red Sox, 3–1 | Cincinnati Reds | |
| 1940^ † | PL | 73–62 | .541 | 4th | — | 3 1/2 | 8–5 | .615 | Won semifinals vs. Richmond Colts, 4–3; Won PL championship vs. Rocky Mount Red Sox, 4–2 | Cincinnati Reds | |
| 1941^ † | PL | 84–53 | .613 | 1st | — | — | 8–1 | .889 | Won semifinals vs. Norfolk Tars, 4–1; Won PL championship vs. Greensboro Red Sox, 4–0 | Brooklyn Dodgers | |
| 1942 | PL | 65–70 | .481 | 5th | — | 15 | — | — | — | Brooklyn Dodgers | |
| 1943 | PL | 44–86 | .338 | 6th | — | 46 | — | — | — | Brooklyn Dodgers | |
| 1945 | CL | 59–77 | .434 | 7th | — | 34 | — | — | — | Boston Red Sox | |
| 1946^ | CL | 80–62 | .563 | 2nd (tie) | — | 5 | 6–6 | .500 | Won semifinals vs. Greensboro Patriots, 4–2; Lost CL championship vs. Raleigh Capitals, 4–2 | Boston Red Sox | |
| 1947^ | CL | 70–71 | .496 | 4th) | — | 16 1/2 | 6–6 | .500 | Won semifinals vs. Winston-Salem Cardinals, 4–2; Lost CL championship vs. Raleigh Capitals, 4–2 | Unaffiliated | |
| 1948 | CL | 63–79 | .444 | 6th | — | 21 | — | — | — | Detroit Tigers | |
| 1949 | CL | 70–72 | .493 | 6th | — | 15 1/2 | — | — | — | Detroit Tigers | |
| 1950 | CL | 73–79 | .480 | 6th | — | 32 1/2 | — | — | — | Detroit Tigers | |
| 1951^ | CL | 84–56 | .600 | 1st | — | — | 1–4 | .200 | Lost semifinals vs. Reidsville Luckies, 4–1 | Detroit Tigers | |
| 1952^ | CL | 76–59 | .563 | 2nd | — | 2 1/2 | 3–4 | .429 | Won semifinals vs. Winston-Salem Cardinals, 3–0; Lost CL championship vs. Reidsville Luckies, 4–0 | Detroit Tigers | |
| 1953 | CL | 64–75 | .460 | 7th | — | 18 1/2 | — | — | — | Detroit Tigers | |
| 1954^ | CL | 70–68 | .507 | 4th | — | 16 1/2 | 1–3 | .250 | Lost semifinals vs. Fayetteville Highlanders, 3–1 | Detroit Tigers | |
| 1955^ | CL | 69–69 | .500 | 4th | — | 11 | 3–4 | .429 | Lost semifinals vs. High Point-Thomasville Hi-Toms, 4–3 | Detroit Tigers | |
| 1956^ | CL | 84–69 | .549 | 2nd | — | 6 1/2 | 1–3 | .250 | Lost semifinals vs. Danville Leafs, 3–1 | Detroit Tigers | |
| 1957^ † | CL | 79–61 | .564 | 1st (tie) | — | — | 4–3 | .571 | Won first-half title Won CL championship vs. High Point-Thomasville Hi-Toms, 4–3 | Detroit Tigers | |
| 1958 | CL | 58–79 | .423 | 8th | — | 21 | — | — | — | Detroit Tigers | |
| 1959^ | CL | 70–60 | .538 | 3rd | — | 8 | 0–3 | .000 | Lost semifinals vs. Wilson Tobs, 3–0 | Detroit Tigers | |
| 1960 | CL | 57–78 | .422 | 6th | — | 25 | — | — | — | Detroit Tigers | |
| 1961 | CL | 65–73 | .471 | 5th | — | 17 1/2 | — | — | — | Detroit Tigers | |
| 1962^ | CL | 89–51 | .636 | 1st | — | — | 5–4 | .556 | Won semifinals vs. Alamance Indians, 2–0; Lost CL championship vs. Kinston Eagles, 4–3 | Houston Colt .45's | |
| 1963^ | CL | 78–65 | .545 | 2nd | 2nd | 6 1/2 | 2–3 | .400 | Lost semifinals vs. Greensboro Yankees, 3–2 | Houston Colt .45's | |
| 1964 | CL | 54–82 | .397 | 10th | 5th | 26 1/2 | — | — | — | Houston Colt .45's | |
| 1965 * | CL | 83–60 | .580 | 2nd | 1st | — | 2–3 | .400 | Won Western Division title Won semifinals vs. Greensboro Yankees, 2–1; Lost CL championship vs. Tidewater Tides, 2–0 | Houston Astros | |
| 1966 | CL | 62–76 | .449 | 10th | 6th | 19 | — | — | — | Houston Astros | |
| 1967 * † | CL | 74–64 | .536 | 2nd | 1st | — | 5–1 | .833 | Won Western Division title Won quarterfinals vs. Burlington Senators, 1–0; Won semifinals vs. Lynchburg White Sox, 2–0; Won CL championship vs. Tidewater Tides, 2–1 | New York Mets | |
| 1968 * | CL | 83–56 | .597 | 2nd | 1st | — | 3–3 | .500 | Won Eastern Division title Won quarterfinals vs. Peninsula Grays, 1–0; Won semifinals vs. Wilson Tobs, 2–1; Lost CL championship vs. High Point-Thomasville Hi-Toms, 2–0 | New York Mets | |
| 1969^ † | CL | 79–62 | .560 | 2nd | 2nd | 1 1/2 | 6–2 | .750 | Won quarterfinals vs. Kinston Eagles, 2–0; Won semifinals vs. Peninsula Astros, 2–1; Won CL championship vs. Burlington Senators, 2–1 | Philadelphia Phillies | |
| 1970 | CL | 77–63 | .550 | 2nd | — | 3 1/2 | — | — | — | Unaffiliated | |
| 1971 | CL | 56–80 | .412 | 7th | — | 28 | — | — | — | Unaffiliated | |
| 1980 * | CL | 84–56 | .600 | 2nd | 1st | — | 1–3 | .250 | Won First and Second-Half Northern Division titles Won Northern Division title Lost CL championship vs. Peninsula Pilots, 3–1 | Atlanta Braves | |
| 1981 | CL | 70–68 | .507 | 4th (tie) | 4th | 2 | — | — | — | Atlanta Braves | |
| 1982^ * | CL | 80–56 | .588 | 3rd | 2nd | 9 1/2 | 1–3 | .250 | Won First-Half Southern Division title Won Southern Division title vs. Peninsula Pilots, 1–0; Lost CL championship vs. Alexandria Dukes, 3–0 | Atlanta Braves | |
| 1983 | CL | 59–78 | .431 | 6th | 3rd | 13 1/2 | — | — | — | Atlanta Braves | |
| 1984^ * | CL | 68–72 | .486 | 5th | 3rd | 5 | 3–3 | .500 | Won First-Half Southern Division title Won Southern Division title vs. Peninsula Pilots, 2–0; Lost CL championship vs. Lynchburg Mets, 3–1 | Atlanta Braves | |
| 1985 | CL | 66–74 | .471 | 5th | 2nd | 3 1/2 | — | — | — | Atlanta Braves | |
| 1986 | CL | 72–68 | .514 | 4th | 2nd | 11 | — | — | — | Atlanta Braves | |
| 1987 | CL | 65–75 | .464 | 7th | 4th | 10 | — | — | — | Atlanta Braves | |
| 1988 | CL | 82–58 | .586 | 2nd | 2nd | 6 | — | — | — | Atlanta Braves | |
| 1989 * | CL | 84–54 | .609 | 1st | 1st | — | 1–3 | .250 | Won First and Second-Half Southern Division titles Won Southern Division title Lost CL championship vs. Prince William Cannons, 3–1 | Atlanta Braves | |
| 1990 | CL | 71–68 | .511 | 4th | 3rd | 19 | — | — | — | Atlanta Braves | |
| 1991 | CL | 79–58 | .577 | 3rd | 3rd | 9 1/2 | — | — | — | Atlanta Braves | |
| 1992 | CL | 70–70 | .500 | 3rd | 2nd | 5 | — | — | Lost First-Half Southern Division title (Note: Durham finished the 1992 first half tied for first place with the Peninsula Pilots. On June 22, Peninsula defeated Durham, 2–0, in a regular-season game to win the first-half title.) | Atlanta Braves | |
| 1993 | CL | 69–69 | .500 | 5th | 3rd | 2 | — | — | — | Atlanta Braves | |
| 1994^ | CL | 66–70 | .485 | 5th | 2nd | 1/2 | 0–2 | .000 | Won Second-Half Southern Division title Lost Southern Division title vs. Winston-Salem Spirits, 2–0 | Atlanta Braves | |
| 1995 | CL | 63–76 | .453 | 7th | 4th | 19 | — | — | — | Atlanta Braves | |
| 1996^ | CL | 73–66 | .525 | 4th | 3rd | 3 1/2 | 1–2 | .333 | Won First-Half Southern Division title Lost Southern Division title vs. Kinston Indians, 2–1 | Atlanta Braves | |
| 1997 | CL | 63–76 | .453 | 6th | 3rd | 23 1/2 | — | — | — | Atlanta Braves | |
| 1998 * | IL | 80–64 | .556 | 3rd | 1st | — | 5–3 | .625 | Won Southern Division title Won semifinals vs. Louisville Redbirds 3–0; Lost IL championship vs. Buffalo Bisons, 3–2 | Tampa Bay Devil Rays | |
| 1999 * | IL | 83–60 | .580 | 2nd | 1st | — | 4–3 | .571 | Won Southern Division title Won semifinals vs. Columbus Clippers 3–0; Lost IL championship vs. Charlotte Knights, 3–1 | Tampa Bay Devil Rays | |
| 2000 * | IL | 81–62 | .566 | 4th | 1st | — | 2–3 | .400 | Won Southern Division title Lost semifinals vs. Indianapolis Indians 3–2 | Tampa Bay Devil Rays | |
| 2001 | IL | 74–70 | .514 | 5th | 2nd | 12 | — | — | — | Tampa Bay Devil Rays | |
| 2002 * † | IL | 80–64 | .556 | 5th | 1st | — | 6–0 | 1.000 | Won Southern Division title Won semifinals vs. Toledo Mud Hens 3–0; Won IL championship vs. Buffalo Bisons, 3–0 | Tampa Bay Devil Rays | |
| 2003 * † | IL | 73–67 | .521 | 5th | 1st | — | 6–1 | .857 | Won Southern Division title Won semifinals vs. Louisville Bats 3–1; Won IL championship vs. Pawtucket Red Sox, 3–0 | Tampa Bay Devil Rays | |
| 2004^ | IL | 77–67 | .535 | 4th | 2nd | 3 1/2 | 2–3 | .400 | Won wild card berth Lost semifinals vs. Buffalo Bisons 3–2 | Tampa Bay Devil Rays | |
| 2005 | IL | 65–79 | .451 | 12th | 2nd | 14 | — | — | — | Tampa Bay Devil Rays | |
| 2006 | IL | 64–78 | .451 | 11th | 2nd | 15 1/2 | — | — | — | Tampa Bay Devil Rays | |
| 2007 * | IL | 80–63 | .559 | 3rd | 1st | — | 5–3 | .625 | Won Southern Division title Won semifinals vs. Toledo Mud Hens 3–0; Lost IL championship vs. Richmond Braves, 3–2 | Tampa Bay Devil Rays | |
| 2008 * | IL | 74–70 | .514 | 5th (tie) | 1st | — | 4–4 | .500 | Won Southern Division title Won semifinals vs. Louisville Bats 3–1; Lost IL championship vs. Scranton/Wilkes-Barre Yankees, 3–1 | Tampa Bay Rays | |
| 2009 * † ‡ | IL | 83–61 | .576 | 2nd | 1st | — | 7–2 | .778 | Won Southern Division title Won semifinals vs. Louisville Bats 3–2; Won IL championship vs. Scranton/Wilkes-Barre Yankees, 3–0; Won Triple-A championship vs. Memphis Redbirds, 1–0 | Tampa Bay Rays | |
| 2010 * | IL | 88–55 | .615 | 1st | 1st | — | 4–5 | .444 | Won Southern Division title Won semifinals vs. Louisville Bats 3–2; Lost IL championship vs. Columbus Clippers, 3–1 | Tampa Bay Rays | |
| 2011 * | IL | 80–62 | .563 | 3rd | 1st | — | 0–3 | .000 | Won Southern Division title Lost semifinals vs. Columbus Clippers 3–0 | Tampa Bay Rays | |
| 2012 | IL | 66–78 | .458 | 11th | 3rd | 17 | — | — | — | Tampa Bay Rays | |
| 2013 * † | IL | 87–57 | .604 | 1st | 1st | — | 6–2 | .750 | Won Southern Division title Won semifinals vs. Indianapolis Indians 3–0; Won IL championship vs. Pawtucket Red Sox, 3–1; Lost Triple-A championship vs. Omaha Storm Chasers, 0–1 | Tampa Bay Rays | |
| 2014 * | IL | 75–69 | .521 | 6th | 1st | — | 5–4 | .556 | Won Southern Division title Won semifinals vs. Columbus Clippers 3–1; Lost IL championship vs. Pawtucket Red Sox, 3–2 | Tampa Bay Rays | |
| 2015 | IL | 74–70 | .514 | 7th (tie) | 3rd (tie) | 4 | — | — | — | Tampa Bay Rays | |
| 2016 | IL | 64–80 | .444 | 12th | 3rd | 1 1/2 | — | — | — | Tampa Bay Rays | |
| 2017 * † ‡ | IL | 86–56 | .606 | 2nd | 1st | — | 7–2 | .778 | Won Southern Division title Won semifinals vs. Indianapolis Indians 3–1; Won IL championship vs. Scranton/Wilkes-Barre RailRiders, 3–1; Won Triple-A championship vs. Memphis Redbirds, 1–0 | Tampa Bay Rays | |
| 2018 * † | IL | 79–60 | .568 | 2nd | 1st | — | 6–4 | .600 | Won Southern Division title Won semifinals vs. Toledo Mud Hens 3–1; Won IL championship vs. Scranton/Wilkes-Barre RailRiders, 3–2; Lost Triple-A championship vs. Memphis Redbirds, 0–1 | Tampa Bay Rays | |
| 2019^ | IL | 75–64 | .540 | 3rd (tie) | 2nd (tie) | 5 | 3–3 | .500 | Won wild card berth Won semifinals vs. Scranton/Wilkes-Barre RailRiders 3–0; Lost IL championship vs. Columbus Clippers, 3–0 | Tampa Bay Rays | |
| 2020 | IL | Season cancelled (COVID-19 pandemic) | | | | | | | | Tampa Bay Rays | |
| 2021 † ‡ | AAAE | 86–44 (Note: In 2021, the team with the best record at the end of the regular-season was declared the Triple-A East champion. Durham had a 77–43 (.642) record, which put them in 1st place in the league and made them the AAAE champion. The regular-season was followed by the Triple-A Final Stretch, a 10-game postseason tournament in which all 30 Triple-A clubs competed for the highest winning percentage. Durham finished the tournament in 1st place with a 9–1 (.900) record, making them the Triple-A champions.) | .662 | 1st | 1st | — | — | — | Won AAAE championship Won Triple-A championship | Tampa Bay Rays | |
| 2022 * † ‡ | IL | 86–64 | .573 | 3rd | 1st | — | 2–0 | 1.000 | Won Eastern Division title Won IL championship vs. Nashville Sounds, 1–0; Won Triple-A championship vs. Reno Aces, 1–0 | Tampa Bay Rays | |
| 2023^ | IL | 88–62 | .587 | 2nd | 2nd | 2 1/2 | 1–2 | .333 | Won second-half title Lost IL championship vs. Norfolk Tides, 2–1 | Tampa Bay Rays | |
| 2024 | IL | 72–78 | .480 | 11th (tie) | 6th | 17 1/2 | — | — | — | Tampa Bay Rays | |
| 2025 | IL | 85–64 | .570 | 6th | 4th | 3 1/2 | — | — | — | Tampa Bay Rays | |
| 2026 | IL | 67–81 | .453 | 16th | 9th | 23 | — | — | — | Tampa Bay Rays | |
| Totals | — | 7,111–6,655 | .516 | — | — | — | 164–145 | .531 | — | — | — |

== Radio and television ==
All Bulls home and road games are broadcast on 96.5 FM Buzz Sports Radio. Live audio broadcasts are also available online through the team's website and the MiLB First Pitch app. Select home games are televised on Me-TV 50.2, and all home games are broadcast by WRAL Sports+. All home and road games can be viewed through the MiLB.TV subscription feature of the official website of Minor League Baseball, with audio provided by a radio simulcast.

Former play-by-play announcers include Gary Cohen, who was the Voice of the Bulls in 1986 and became part of the New York Mets' broadcast team in 1989, Steve Barnes (who also was the Duke women's basketball radio play-by-play announcer), and Neil Solondz, who was with Durham from 2004 to 2011 before being hired by the Tampa Bay Rays. Patrick Kinas has been the announcer since 2012.

Broadcasts are produced by members of Explorer Post 50, a youth-based group for students who have completed middle school and are 14 to 20 years old. The program provides youth with hands-on experience in television production.

== Current roster ==
Durham Bulls roster
| Players | Coaches/Other |
|---|---|
| Pitchers: 30 Alexander Alberto; 17 Hunter Bigge *; 39 Joe Boyle *; 60 Chris Clark; 65 Mason Englert *; 26 Michael Grove *; 5 Cam Hill; 55 Griffin Jax *#; 54 Marcus Johnson; 31 Trevor Martin *; 19 Evan Reifert; 31 Manuel Rodriguez *#; 37 John Rooney; 45 Jesse Scholtens *; 12 Chase Solesky *; 60 Cole Sulser *#; -- Austin Vernon; 28 Kodi Whitley; 34 Owen Wild; 38 Steven Wilson *; 36 Jake Woodford *; 29 Logan Workman; 17 Justin Yeager; Catchers: 12 Caden Bodine; 22 Logan Driscoll; 43 Tatem Levins; 50 Kenny Piper *; 24 Blake Sabol; Infielders: 50 Jadher Areinamo *; 27 Logan Davidson; 3 Oliver Dunn *; 36 Chris Clark; 22 Xavier Isaac; 20 Nick Madrigal *; 9 Tre' Morgan; 23 Carson Williams *; 2 Ben Williamson *#; Outfielders: 35 Homer Bush Jr.; 16 Jake Cave * ~; 6 Jake Fraley *#; 7 Jacob Melton *; 16 Jared Oliva; 13 Austin Slater *; 4 Jack Suwinski * | Manager: 14 Morgan Ensberg; Coaches: 66 Henry Bonilla (bullpen); 15 Reid Brignac (coach); 1 Keoni DeRenne (hitting); 38 Brian Reith (pitching); 32 German Melendez (bench); 60-day injured list: 54 Aaron Brooks (full season); -- Brian Van Belle (full season); 7-day injured list; * On Tampa Bay Rays 40-man roster; ~ Development list; # Rehab assignment; ∞ Reserve list; ‡ Restricted list; § Suspended list; † Temporarily inactive list; Roster updated September 18, 2026; Transactions; → More rosters: MiLB • International League; → Tampa Bay Rays minor league players |

== Achievements ==
=== Awards ===
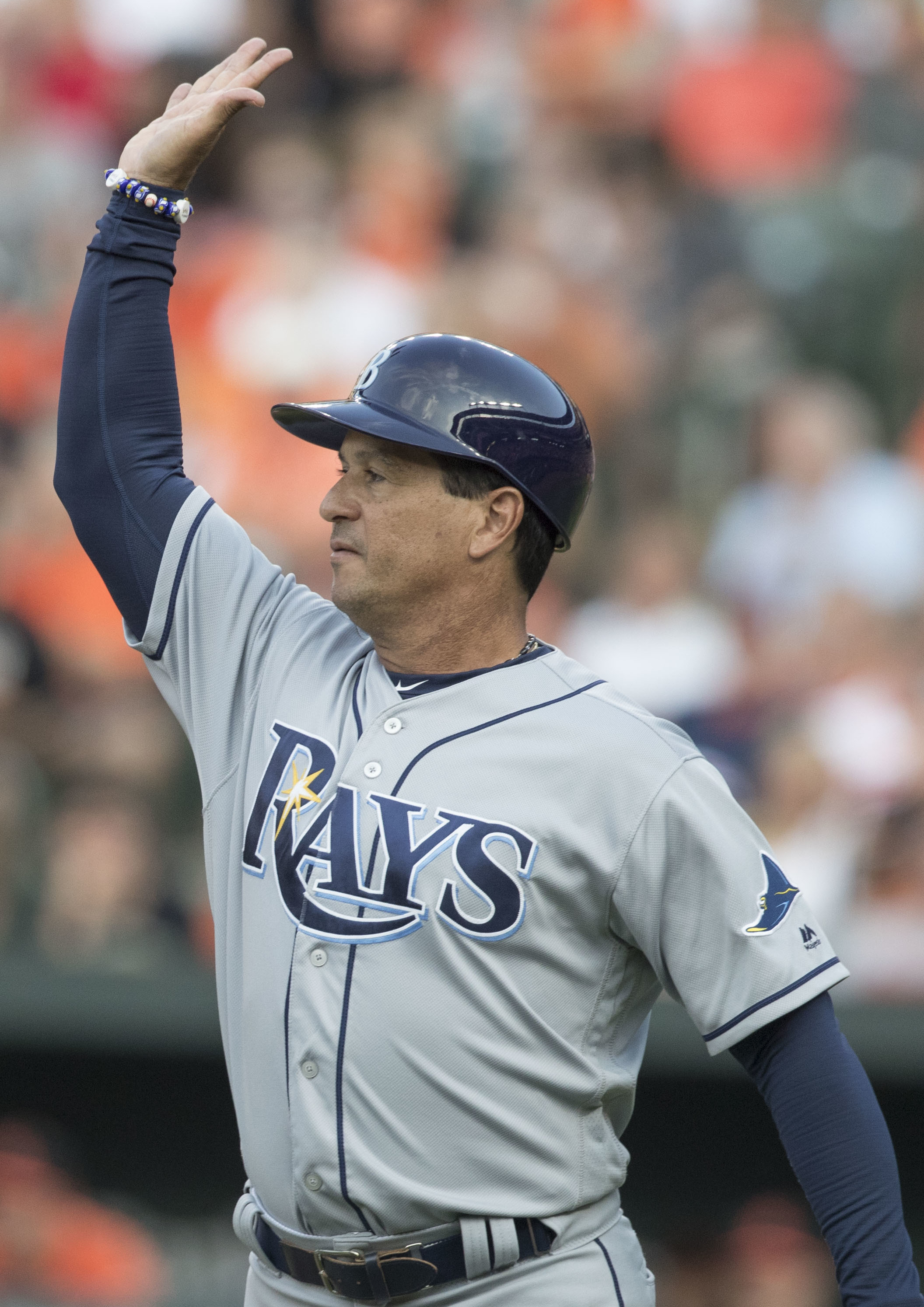
Charlie Montoyo won the 2009 Mike Coolbaugh Award and the 2010 and 2013 IL Manager of the Year Awards.

These honors have been awarded to the franchise or its personnel by Minor League Baseball.

Minor League Baseball awards
| Award | Recipient | Season | Ref. |
|---|---|---|---|
| John H. Johnson President's Award | — | 1989 | |
| John H. Johnson President's Award | — | 2014 | |
| Mike Coolbaugh Award | Charlie Montoyo | 2009 | |

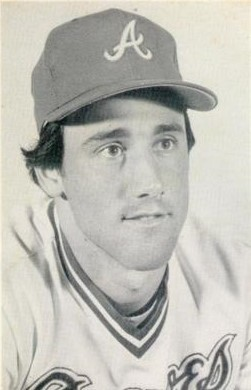
Brad Komminsk was the 1981 CL Most Valuable Player.

Four players, eight managers, and one executive won league awards in recognition for their performance with Durham in the Carolina League.

Carolina League awards
| Award | Recipient | Season | Ref. |
|---|---|---|---|
| Most Valuable Player | Rusty Staub | 1962 | |
| Most Valuable Player | Cliff Johnson | 1970 | |
| Most Valuable Player | Brad Komminsk | 1981 | |
| Pitcher of the Year | Kent Mercker | 1988 | |
| Manager of the Year | Floyd Patterson | 1946 | |
| Manager of the Year | Ace Parker | 1949 | |
| Manager of the Year | Ace Parker | 1951 | |
| Manager of the Year | Johnny Pesky | 1956 | |
| Manager of the Year | Bobby Mavis | 1957 | |
| Manager of the Year | Lou Fitzgerald | 1962 | |
| Manager of the Year | Clyde McCullough | 1967 | |
| Manager of the Year | Cliff Davis | 1970 | |
| Manager of the Year | Grady Little | 1989 | |
| Executive of the Year | Rob Dlugozima | 1991 | |

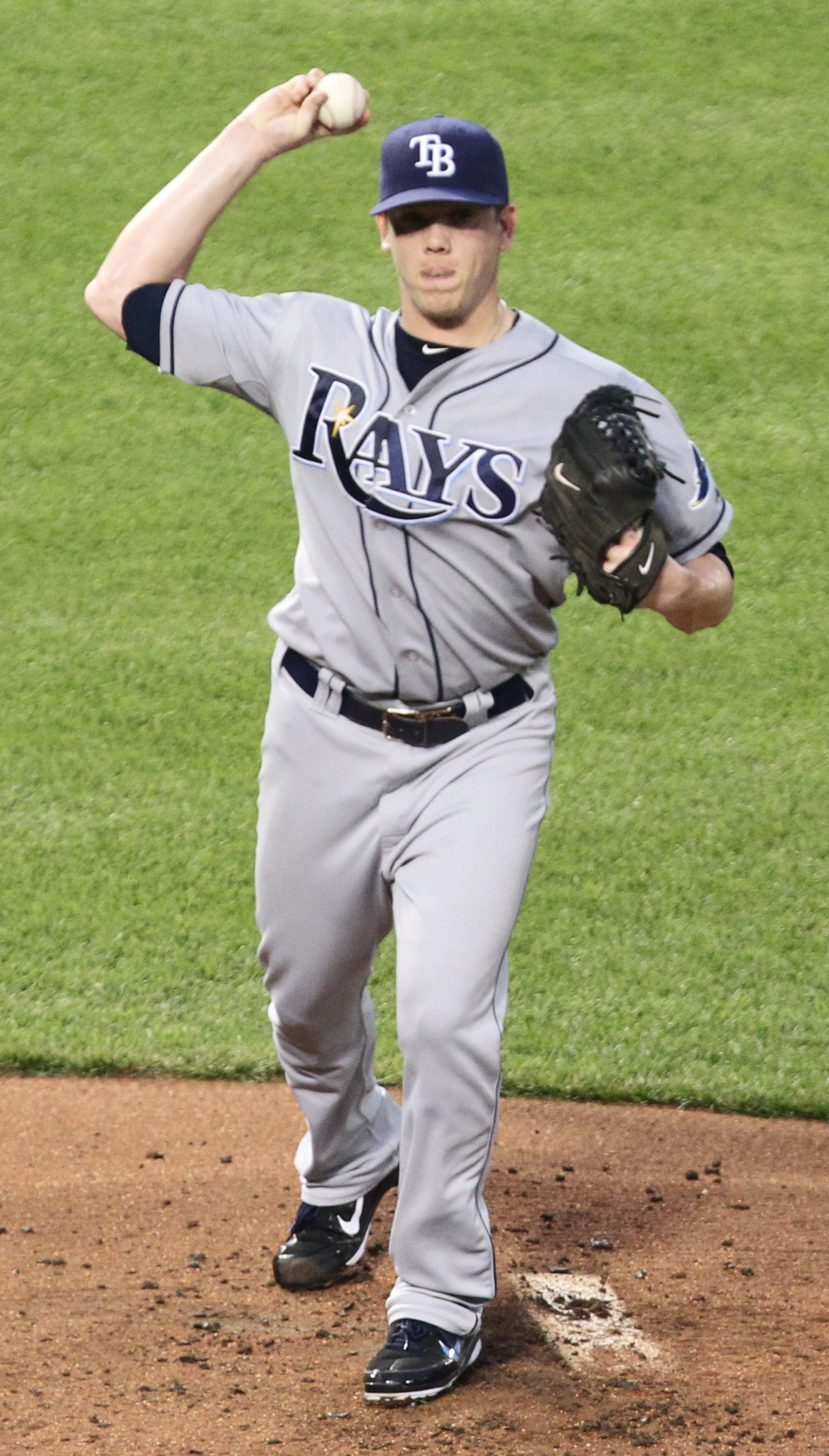
Jeremy Hellickson was the 2010 IL Most Valuable Pitcher.

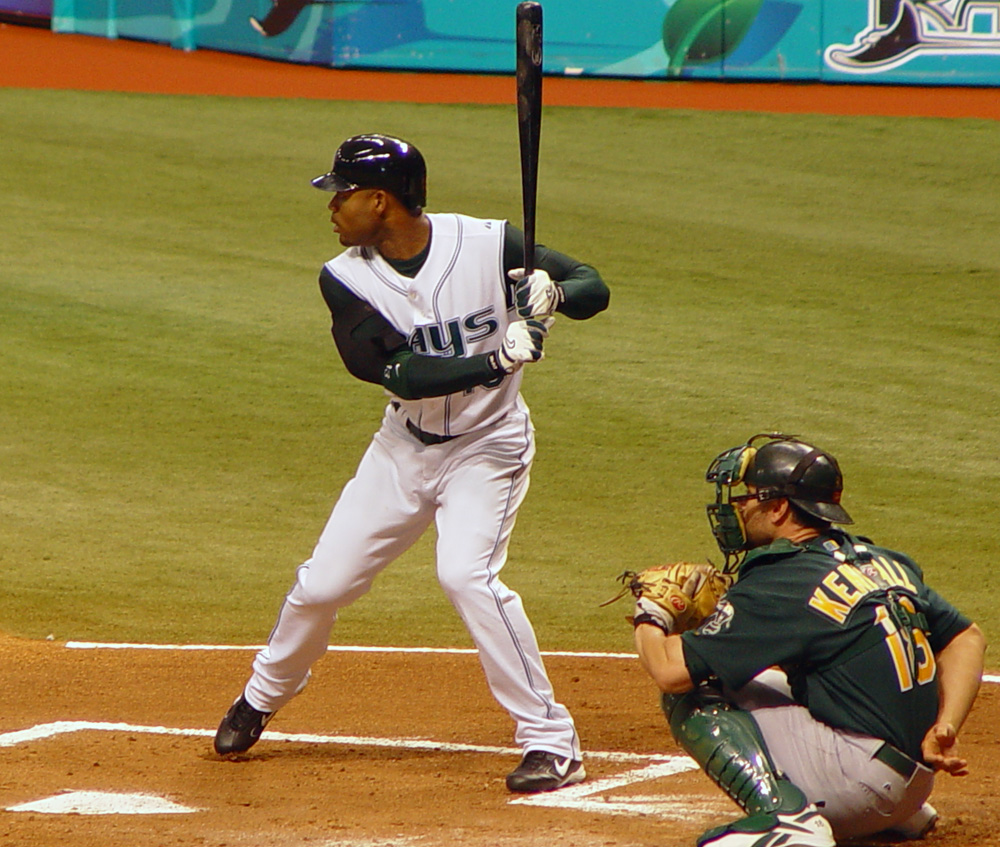
Carl Crawford was the 2002 IL Rookie of the Year.

Ten players, two managers, and two executives have won league awards in recognition for their performance with Durham in the International League.

International League awards
| Award | Recipient | Season | Ref. |
|---|---|---|---|
| Most Valuable Player | Steve Cox | 1999 | |
| Most Valuable Player | Toby Hall | 2001 | |
| Most Valuable Player | Kevin Witt | 2006 | |
| Most Valuable Player | Dan Johnson | 2010 | |
| Most Valuable Player | Russ Canzler | 2011 | |
| Most Valuable Player | Jonathan Aranda | 2022 | |
| Most Valuable Pitcher | Jeremy Hellickson | 2010 | |
| Most Valuable Pitcher | J. D. Martin | 2013 | |
| Rookie of the Year | Aubrey Huff | 2000 | |
| Rookie of the Year | Carl Crawford | 2002 | |
| Manager of the Year | Charlie Montoyo | 2010 | |
| Manager of the Year | Charlie Montoyo | 2013 | |
| Manager of the Year | Brady Williams | 2021 | |
| Executive of the Year | Mike Birling | 2003 | |
| Executive of the Year | Mike Birling | 2015 | |
| Spirit of the International League | Bill Law | 2013 | |

=== Retired numbers ===
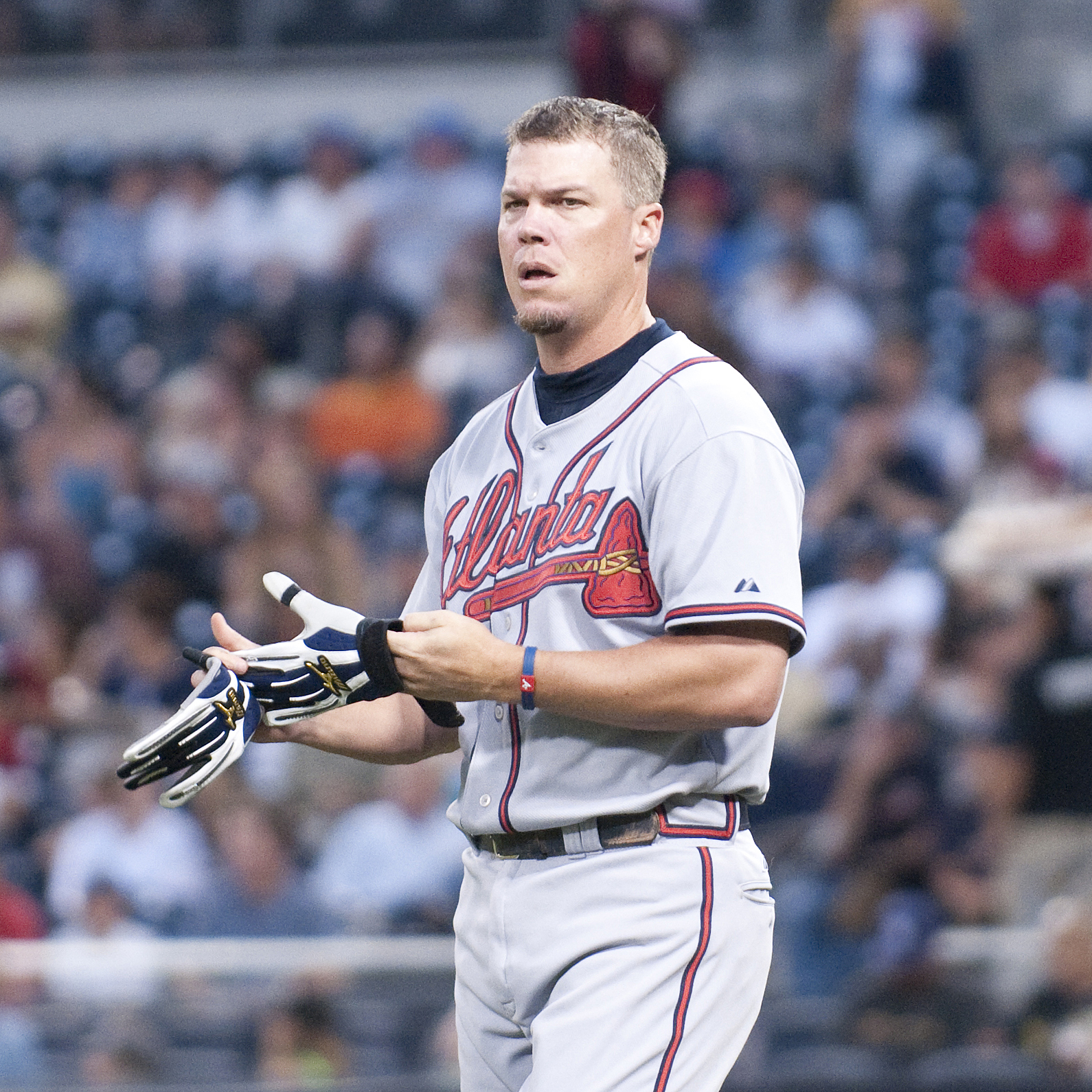
The number 10 was retired in honor of Chipper Jones.

The Bulls have honored five individuals by retiring their uniform numbers. This ensures that the number will be associated with one player of particular importance to the team. An additional number (42) was retired across professional baseball to honor Jackie Robinson, the first African American to play in Major League Baseball in the modern era.

| No. | Name | Season(s) | Position | Retirement date | Ref. |
|---|---|---|---|---|---|
| 8 | Crash Davis | — | Catcher | July 4, 2008 | |
| 10 | Chipper Jones | 1992 | Shortstop | August 20, 2013 | |
| 18 | Joe Morgan | 1963 | Second baseman | June 17, 1993 | |
| 20 | Bill Evers | 1998–2005 | Manager | May 19, 2012 | |
| 25 | Charlie Montoyo | 2007–2014 | Manager | May 19, 2016 | |
| 42 | Jackie Robinson | — | Second baseman | April 15, 1997 | |
