= Puchy Delgado =

Puerto Rican baseball player (born 1954)

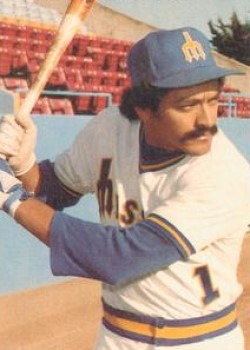
- Outfielder
- Born: February 2, 1954 (age 72); Hatillo, Puerto Rico
- Batted: Switch Threw: Left

MLB debut
- September 6, 1977, for the Seattle Mariners

Last MLB appearance
- October 2, 1977, for the Seattle Mariners

MLB statistics
- Batting average: .182
- Home runs: 0
- Runs batted in: 2
- Stats at Baseball Reference

Teams
- Seattle Mariners (1977)

Luis Felipe "Puchy" Delgado Robles (born February 2, 1954) is a Puerto Rican former professional baseball player who spent seven seasons in professional baseball, including part of a season (1977) in Major League Baseball with the Seattle Mariners. He played 13 games in his one-year major league career, and had four hits in 22 at-bats, with two runs batted in (RBIs). Over his minor league career, Delgado played for the Class-A Winter Haven Red Sox, the Class-A Winston-Salem Red Sox, the Triple-A Rhode Island Red Sox, and the Triple-A Pawtucket Red Sox in the Boston Red Sox organization; the Triple-A San Jose Missions in the Seattle Mariners organization; the Triple-A Omaha Royals in the Kansas City Royals organization; and the Triple-A Wichita Aeros in the Chicago Cubs organization. In 765 career minor league games, Delgado batted .261 with 729 hits, 89 doubles, 33 triples, and 17 home runs.

== Professional career ==
=== Boston Red Sox ===
Before the 1973 season, Delgado signed as an amateur free agent with the Boston Red Sox. He was assigned to the Class-A Winter Haven Red Sox at the start of the 1973 season. With Winter Haven, he batted .264 with 73 hits, six doubles, and four triples in 99 games. In 1974, Delgado continued to play for the Winter Haven Red Sox. In 111 games, he batted .264 with 44 runs, 96 hits, one doubles, five triples, and 27 runs batted in (RBIs). Delgado was tied for first on the Red Sox in triples. Delgado continued at the Class-A level in 1975, this time with the Winston-Salem Red Sox of the Carolina League. He batted .257 with 100 hits, 11 doubles, four triples, and one home run in 104 games. Delgado split the 1976 season between the Class-A Winston-Salem Red Sox and the Triple-A Rhode Island Red Sox. With Winston-Salem, he batted .294 with 143 hits, 21 doubles, six triples, and seven home runs in 122 games. He led the Carolina League in hits, and was fifth in batting average. That season, he also played two games with the Rhode Island Red Sox and got one hit (a double) in two at-bats.

=== Seattle Mariners ===
Despite playing in the Boston Red Sox organization in 1977, he was selected by the Seattle Mariners in the 1976 Major League Baseball expansion draft. In 1977, Delgado began the season with the Triple-A Pawtucket Red Sox. He batted .281 with 73 runs, 132 hits, 20 doubles, five triples, seven home runs, 53 RBIs, 18 stolen bases, and 12 caught stealing in 119 games. Delgado led the Red Sox in runs, stolen bases, and caught stealing. After spring training in 1977, Delgado was optioned to the minor leagues. He made his major league debut that season on September 6. In that game against the Kansas City Royals he struck out in his first at-bat. Delgado's first hit, a single, came against the Texas Rangers on September 9. He finished his first and last major league season with four hits, four runs, in 23 at-bats. In 1978, Delgado continued playing in the Seattle Mariners organization. With the Triple-A San Jose Missions, Delgado batted .252 with 83 runs, 136 hits, 19 doubles, seven triples, two home runs, 49 RBIs, and 49 stolen bases in 136 games. He led the Missions in games played, triples, and stolen bases that season.

=== Later career ===
In Delgado's final season, 1979, he played for two different organizations. On March 20, 1979, Delgado was traded to the Chicago Cubs for Larry Cox. Delgado was assigned to the Triple-A Wichita Aeros in the Cubs organization. With the Aeros, he batted .159 with 13 hits, four doubles, and one triple in 19 games. Delgado then joined the Kansas City Royals organization later that season and was assigned to the Triple-A Omaha Royals. In 17 games with the Omaha club, he batted .224 with 11 hits, and one double. 1979 would prove to be Delgado's final season in professional baseball.
