= Jeff Schneider =

American baseball player (born 1952)

- Pitcher
- Born: December 6, 1952 (age 73); Bremerton, Washington
- Batted: Both Threw: Left

MLB debut
- August 12, 1981, for the Baltimore Orioles

Last MLB appearance
- October 2, 1981, for the Baltimore Orioles

MLB statistics
- Innings pitched: 24
- Win–loss record: 0–0
- Earned run average: 4.88
- Strikeouts: 17
- Stats at Baseball Reference

Teams
- Baltimore Orioles (1981)

Jeffrey Theodore Schneider (born December 6, 1952) is an American former professional baseball player. He appeared in 11 Major League games as a relief pitcher for the Baltimore Orioles in 1981. A switch hitter who threw left-handed, Schneider stood 6 feet 3 inches (1.91 m) tall and weighed 195 pounds (88 kg). He is perhaps best remembered for appearing on Cal Ripken Jr.'s 1982 Topps rookie card.

Born in Washington, Schneider attended high school in Illinois before attending Iowa State University. Drafted twice, he signed with neither team, opting to sign with the Philadelphia Phillies as a free agent in 1974. He played five years in their organization, leading the Carolina League in wins and saves in 1977 without making a single start. After the 1978 season, he was selected by the Baltimore Orioles in the Rule 5 draft; he reached the major leagues in 1981 when the Orioles sought to reinforce their roster for the second half of the season. Used exclusively in relief, Schneider appeared in 11 games, recording a save. After the season, he was a minor part of a trade to the California Angels. He split 1982 between their system and the Toronto Blue Jays' organization and finished his career in 1983 in the minors for the Blue Jays.

== Early life ==
Schneider was born in Bremerton, Washington but attended Alleman Catholic High School in Rock Island, Illinois. The Chicago Cubs drafted him in the 18th round of the 1970 Major League Baseball (MLB) Draft upon his graduation, but he chose to attend Iowa State University in order to get "an education and... play basketball." He was again drafted by the Texas Rangers in 1973, this time in the second round, but he chose not to sign and eventually signed as an amateur free agent in 1974 with the Philadelphia Phillies.

== Philadelphia Phillies (minors) ==
Schneider began his minor league career with four appearances (one start) for the Class A Short Season Auburn Phillies of the New York–Penn League in 1974. He remained at Auburn in 1975 where, used exclusively in relief, he had a 3–2 record, a 2.82 earned run average (ERA), and 37 strikeouts in 21 games, along with 24 walks in 51 innings pitched. He moved up to the Peninsula Pilots of the Class A Carolina League in 1976, where he was used as a starter for his only significant amount of time professionally. In 29 games (13 starts), he had a 4–7 record, a 3.93 ERA, and 77 strikeouts in 103 innings. Despite moving into the bullpen full-time in 1977, he led the Carolina League with 15 wins and 22 saves for Pensacola while recording 102 strikeouts in 119 innings of work. Promoted to the Double-A Reading Phillies of the Eastern League in 1978, he went 4–4 with a 2.83 ERA and two saves in 42 games (one start) to go along with 56 strikeouts and 47 walks in 86 innings. After the season, he was drafted into the Baltimore Orioles' organization in the Rule 5 draft.

== Baltimore Orioles ==
=== 1979-81 (minors) ===
Schneider pitched for the Charlotte O's of the Double-A Southern Association in 1979, where he again made 42 appearances (one start). He had a 3–7 record, a 3.43 ERA, 67 strikeouts, and four saves in 105 innings of work. He was promoted to the Triple-A Rochester Red Wings in 1980, where he had a 2–4 record, a 4.86 ERA, 28 strikeouts, 25 walks, and eight saves in 45 games over 50 innings of work. In 1981, with Rochester, he had a 5–1 record, a 2.35 ERA, and 61 strikeouts in 69 innings while collecting 12 saves. He participated in the longest professional baseball game, pitching 5 1/3 scoreless innings of relief with eight strikeouts for Rochester as they lost 3–2 to the Pawtucket Red Sox in 33 innings.

=== 1981; lone major league season ===
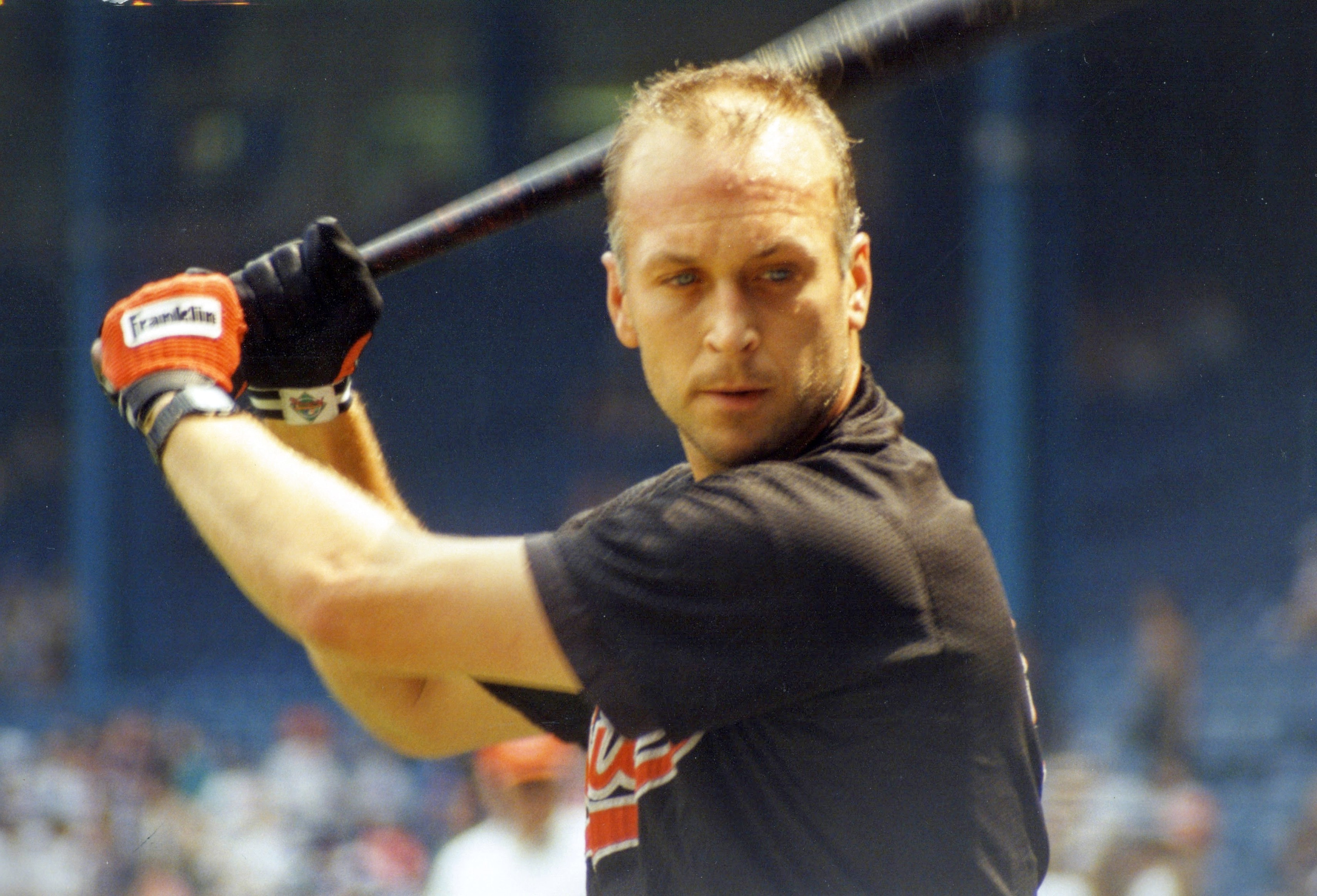
Cal Ripken Jr., was called up at the same time as Schneider in 1981

A strike split the 1981 major league season, and the Orioles, in an attempt to strengthen their roster, called up Schneider and Cal Ripken Jr., on August 7. Schneider replaced Steve Luebber. In his debut game, at Memorial Stadium on August 12, he gave up a grand slam home run to Frank White of the Kansas City Royals, But in his final 10 games, he compiled an earned run average of 3.74. On August 19, he logged a career-high 4 1/3 innings in relief of Mike Flanagan during a 6–3 loss to the California Angels. He earned his only MLB save on August 25, recording the final out of a 6–5 win against the Seattle Mariners. Schneider made what would be the final appearance of his brief major league career October 2, allowing two runs over three innings of relief in a 9–0 loss to the New York Yankees. In his career, all of which came during the 1981 season, he allowed 27 hits and 12 walks, with 17 strikeouts, in 24 innings pitched. His ERA was 4.88. The Orioles finished fourth during the second-half of the season (two games out of first) and failed to qualify for the playoffs.

== California Angels and Toronto Blue Jays (minors) ==
A trade sending Schneider and Doug DeCinces from the Orioles to the Angels for Dan Ford was announced on January 28, 1982. It was delayed when Ford requested additional compensation because the Orioles were not one of six teams listed in his contract to which he could be traded without approval. The transaction became official upon his approval two days later on January 30.

Schneider made 18 appearances in 1982 for the Spokane Indians, their Pacific Coast League affiliate, before getting sent to the Toronto Blue Jays during the season. He pitched 34 games (two starts) for the Syracuse Chiefs of the International League, where he spent the rest of the season. His combined Triple-A totals for that year were a 3–5 record, a 4.04 ERA, 51 strikeouts, 50 walks, and eight saves in 78 innings of work in 52 games. He pitched one final season, for Syracuse in 1983. In 37 games, he had a 4–4 record, a 5.13 ERA, 52 strikeouts, and 60 walks in 66 2/3 innings while recording three saves. He said that after retiring, life took him "to school, family, job, friends. Back to being a normal person."

Schneider is perhaps best remembered for appearing on the 1982 Topps "Baltimore Orioles Future Stars", a rookie card that also featured Hall of Famer Cal Ripken Jr.
