= Gene Hassell =

Eugene "Gene" Hassell was a minor league baseball player and manager. He played eleven years in the minor leagues then managed for another six in the minors. As a player, Hassell was an infielder with a high on-base percentage and speed but without power; he failed to hit a single home run in his professional baseball career. He led his league at least once in walks, OBP and steals.

Hassell broke in with the 1951 Wilson Tobs, hitting .274. In 1952, he returned to the Tobs. He was second in OBP, trailing only Wayne Blackburn, and drew a Coastal Plain League leading 142 walks while only striking out 27 times. Hassell stole 40 bases, fourth in the league, and scored 98 runs, second best. His .955 fielding percentage led league's third basemen by 25 points and he had the most double plays (30), putouts (141) and assists (346) at the hot corner despite being 7th in the 8-team league in errors (23).

In 1953, Gene played for the St. Petersburg Saints, hitting .318. He walked 143 times in 132 games while only striking out nineteen times in 132 AB. He led the Florida International League in walks, OBP and stolen bases (42). He scored 103 runs. His .979 fielding percentage led second basemen with 100+ games while he led league in putouts (364), assists (420) and double plays (88) for his position.

Hassell spent most of 1954 with the Burlington-Graham Pirates, hitting .337, and hit .286 in a brief stint with the Denver Bears. In 1955, Hassell played for the Birmingham Barons, hitting .306 with 108 walks to fifteen strikeouts. He just missed the Southern Association's top 3 in OBP, tied Edward White for third in runs (97) and was second in the league in walks.

In 1956, Hassell made his AAA debut, with Denver (Denver had been a Class A team when he was them in 1954). Gene hit .319 with twenty-four runs batted in as the leadoff hitter for a team that made the American Association finals. He was among the circuit's top ten in batting average. In 1957, Hassell returned to the Bears and hit .308. He only had 188 AB in 85 games, backing up Curt Roberts at second base and Rance Pless at third base, plus being a key pinch hitter for Denver. In the Junior World Series, Gene got the start at second base with Roberts suffering a leg injury and the sub went four for thirteen with two doubles, a triple and a steal as the leadoff hitter for the Bears. Denver won the title, but Hassell hurt his leg while doubling to lead off the finale and Roberts had to play despite his own pains and limitations.

In 1958, Gene hit .292 for Denver, followed by a .284 campaign in 1959. In 1960, he moved to the Charleston Senators but hit just .211. He faded even further in his final season, only hitting .122 for the Amarillo Gold Sox and .198 for the Des Moines Demons.

== Year-by-Year Managerial Record ==
Year	Team	League	Record	Finish	Organization	Playoffs
1968	Johnson City Yankees	Appalachian League	39-32	3rd	New York Yankees	none
1969	Kinston Eagles	Carolina League	74-68	5th	New York Yankees	Lost in 1st round
1970	Manchester Yankees	Eastern League	66-73	5th	New York Yankees	none
1971	Kinston Eagles	Carolina League	83-52	2nd	New York Yankees	Lost League Finals
1972	Kinston Eagles	Carolina League	73-64	3rd	New York Yankees	
1973	Kinston Eagles	Carolina League	68-69	4th	New York Yankees	
1974	Johnson City Yankees	Appalachian League	31-38	6th	New York Yankees	none
1975	Kingsport Braves	Appalachian League	33-33	6th	Atlanta Braves	none
1976	Greenwood Braves	Western Carolinas League	75-64	2nd	Atlanta Braves	League Champs
1977	Savannah Braves	Southern League	77-63	3rd	Atlanta Braves	Lost in 1st round
1979	Kingsport Braves	Appalachian League	39-31	2nd	Atlanta Braves	none
