= Red Springs Twins =

- 1969; Red Springs, North Carolina

Minor league affiliations
- Class: Class A (1969)
- League: Carolina League (1969)

Major league affiliations
- Team: Minnesota Twins (1969)

Team data
- Name: Red Springs Twins (1969)
- Ballpark: Robbins Park

The Red Springs Twins baseball club was an American minor league baseball franchise representing Red Springs, North Carolina, in the Class A Carolina League. Affiliated with the namesake Minnesota Twins of Major League Baseball, the Red Springs team existed for only season — 1969 — with the city billing itself as the "world's smallest baseball town." Red Springs, in Robeson County, North Carolina, then boasted a population of 4,040. (The 2000 census lists its population at 3,493 inhabitants.)

== Tiny community outdrew larger city ==
The team, which played at Robbins Park, was created when the Wilson Tobs relocated after a 1968 season during which they drew 22,811 fans. In moving from Wilson (then a city of about 35,000) to Red Springs, the team was entering a market about one-ninth the size of its predecessor. Red Springs had previously hosted a professional team, the Red Springs Red Robins, in the Class D level Tobacco State League, from 1947 to 1950.

Nonetheless, the Class A Twins were received enthusiastically in Red Springs in 1969 and drew 40,332 fans — almost doubling the Tobs' numbers from 1968.

Owned by construction executive Matt Boykin, the Red Springs Twins were managed by former Major League outfielder Tom Umphlett, a native North Carolinian. They struggled in the standings, compiling the poorest winning percentage (.404) in the Carolina League among its ten member clubs. However, six future Major Leaguers were on the Red Springs roster.

At the end of the year, the Carolina League contracted to eight teams, and the Red Springs franchise disappeared from the organized baseball map. The Twins moved their Carolina League affiliate to Lynchburg, Virginia, for 1970.

== Notable alumni ==
- Steve Brye
- Ray Corbin
- Pete Hamm
- Dan Monzon
- Eric Soderholm
- Bill Zepp

== See also ==
- Red Springs, North Carolina
