= Rocky Mount Phillies =

- 1973–1975; Rocky Mount, North Carolina

Minor league affiliations
- Previous classes: A
- League: Carolina League

Major league affiliations
- Previous teams: Philadelphia Phillies (1973-1975)

Minor league titles
- League titles: 1975

Team data
- Previous parks: Rocky Mount Municipal Stadium

The Rocky Mount Phillies were a baseball team, a Class-A affiliate of the Philadelphia Phillies from 1973 through 1975. They played in the Carolina League and won the league championship in 1975. The Rocky Mount Phillies replaced the Rocky Mount Leafs, which had been affiliated with the Detroit Tigers from 1965 through 1972. The club played at Rocky Mount Municipal Stadium in Rocky Mount, North Carolina.
