= High Point-Thomasville Hi-Toms =

- 1937–1969; (1937–1942, 1945–1958, 1965–1966, 1968–1969); Thomasville, North Carolina

Minor league affiliations
- Class: Class A (1965–1966, 1968–1969); Class B (1954–1958); Class D (1937–1942, 1945–1953)
- League: Carolina League (1968–1969); Western Carolinas League (1965–1966); Carolina League (1954–1958); Tar Heel League (1953); North Carolina State League (1937–1942, 1945–1952)

Major league affiliations
- Team: Kansas City Royals (1968–1969); Minnesota Twins (1965–1966); Philadelphia Phillies (1957–1958); Cincinnati Reds (1954–1956); Boston Red Sox (1951–1952); Boston Braves (1948–1949); Brooklyn Dodgers (1945–1947); Cleveland Indians (1940–1942)

Minor league titles
- League titles (5): 1938; 1942; 1949; 1951; 1968

Team data
- Name: High Point-Thomasville Royals (1969); High Point-Thomasville Hi-Toms (1968); Thomasville Hi-Toms (1965–1966); High Point-Thomasville Hi-Toms (1948–1958); Thomasville Dodgers (1945–1947); Thomasville Tommies (1939–1942); Thomasville Chair Makers (1937–1938)
- Ballpark: Finch Field

Thomasville, North Carolina was home to several minor league baseball teams from 1937 to 1969.

The Thomasville Chair Makers joined the North Carolina State League in 1937 and became the Thomasville Tommies in 1939. They were an affiliate of the Cleveland Indians from 1940 to 1942. No team was fielded during World War II.

The Thomasville Dodgers (an affiliate of the Brooklyn Dodgers) took the field in 1945.

In 1948, the team name was changed to reflect both Thomasville and High Point, North Carolina. The new name, the High Point-Thomasville Hi-Toms operated continuously through 1958, switching to the Tar Heel League in 1953 and then the Carolina League in 1954.

No team existed until 1965 when the team reformed as the Thomasville Hi-Toms for two seasons in the Western Carolinas League. After one more season, they returned as a Kansas City Royals affiliate for 1968 and 1969 in the Carolina League.

Since 1999, a new version of the team has played in the Coastal Plain League as a collegiate summer baseball team.

== Notable alumni ==
- Eddie Mathews (1948) Inducted Baseball Hall of Fame, 1978
- Curt Flood (1956) 3x MLB All-Star
- Dallas Green (1957) Manager: 1980 World Series Champion Philadelphia Phillies
- Jack McKeon (1968, MGR) Manager: 2003 World Series Champion Florida Marlins
- Jim Rooker (1969)
- Al Rosen (1942) 4x MLB All-Star; 1953 AL Most Valuable Player
- Gene Stephens (1951)
- Sammy Taylor (1950)
