= Raleigh-Durham Triangles =

From 1968 to 1971, the Durham Bulls baseball team played as the Raleigh-Durham Mets for the 1968 season, played as the Raleigh-Durham Phillies for the 1969 season, and played as the Raleigh-Durham Triangles for the 1970 and 1971 seasons. The team remained in the Carolina League. The team played at both Durham Athletic Park which was located in Durham, North Carolina, and at Devereaux Meadow which is located in Raleigh, North Carolina.

The Durham Bulls were renamed because the team itself acquired the nearby Carolina League rival Raleigh baseball team and the Raleigh team merged into the Bulls. The merge happened after the 1967 season. Before the merge and at the time, the Bulls were affiliated with the New York Mets for the 1967 season. The team was able to maintain its affiliation with the Mets after the merge, but the team then switched to the parent club's name. The team continued as the Mets affiliate for the 1968 season only. The team then switched affiliations to the Philadelphia Phillies for the 1969 season which ended up being the only season affiliated with the Phillies. The Phillies abandoned them and the team was renamed the Triangles for the 1970 season. The team did not have a major league affiliate for the 1970 season and the 1971 season, their last season as the Triangles. The team remained known as the Triangles through their last season, but then folded after the season. At that point, baseball in Raleigh officially ended and baseball did not return to Durham until 1980.

== Year-by-year record ==
Year	Record	Finish	Manager	Playoffs
1968	83-56	2nd	Pete Pavlick	Lost League Finals
