= Kinston Expos =

- 1962–1974; Kinston, North Carolina

Minor league affiliations
- Class: Class A (1963–1974); Class B (1962)
- League: Carolina League (1962–1974)

Major league affiliations
- Team: Montreal Expos (1974); Co-op (1973); New York Yankees (1968–1972); Atlanta Braves (1966–1967); Pittsburgh Pirates (1962–1965)

Minor league titles
- League titles (1): 1962

Team data
- Name: Kinston Expos (1974); Kinston Eagles (1962–1973)
- Ballpark: Grainger Stadium (1962–1974)

The Kinston Expos were a Minor League Baseball team of the Carolina League (CL), and the High-A affiliate of the Montreal Expos. They were located in Kinston, North Carolina, and were named for their parent club. The team played its home games at Grainger Stadium, which opened in 1949 and holds 4,100 fans.

Established in 1962, the Expos played through the 1974 season. The franchise folded following that season.

Kinston has served as a farm club for eleven different major league franchises and one minor league club. Professional baseball dates back to a 1908 squad in the Eastern Carolina League. Despite having one of the smallest markets in professional baseball, Kinston has proved its viability for over a century.

The franchise won a league title as the Kinston Eagles in 1962 as an affiliate of the Pittsburgh Pirates. Hundreds of men played for the franchise including Ron Guidry.

Kinston is served today by the Down East Wood Ducks, an affiliate of the Texas Rangers.

== History ==
Kinston's re-entry into Carolina League baseball in 1962 was successful both on the field and at the turnstile. The Eagles were able to claim the first of its Carolina League crowns. At a time when Kinston's population was only 25,000, the ball club attracted over 140,000 fans. Part of the lure was the talent supplied by Kinston's parent club, the Pittsburgh Pirates, which included Steve Blass (17–3, 1.97 ERA, 209 K's), and Frank Bork (19–7, 2.00 ERA). Another fan attraction was that the Eagles were for the first time a community owned team, operating under the non-profit Kinston Eagles Baseball Company, run by an elected eighteen-man, unpaid board of directors. Profits were reinvested into improving the stadium, promoting the team, and supplying playing equipment for the youth of Kinston. This arrangement continued through all thirteen years of Kinston's second tenure in the Carolina League, from 1962 through 1974.

In 1963 minor league baseball was restructured nationwide, with B, C and D classes eliminated. The Carolina League became a High-A circuit. The Eagles failed to win any championships during this second era of Carolina League play, but they managed to make the playoffs in six of thirteen seasons. The Pirates stuck with Kinston through the 1965 campaign. During three of those four seasons, the Eagles were managed by Harding "Pete" Peterson, who later oversaw the Pirates farm system, and become the Pirates' general manager, helping to build the late seventies team that won the World Series. The Eagles became affiliated with the new Atlanta Braves during 1966 and 1967, under the management of Andy Pafko. From 1968 through 1973 the Eagles were affiliation with the New York Yankees; the fans saw a lot of future all-stars pass through the city including a young Ron Guidry who would soon establish himself as one of the best pitchers in the American League.

During the 1970s the popularity of minor league baseball reached its lowest point and the attendance in Kinston fell to only 30,000 for the 1973 season. The city needed a revival of interest, and the Expos were turned to for help. The young Montreal franchise boasted a strong farm system with a lot of talent. So much talent in fact, that they decided to experiment with having two High A affiliates. Instead of dividing the players evenly between the two, all the top players were placed in the West Palm Beach club, while the newly renamed Kinston Expos had to make do with castoffs. The Kinston team soon found itself overmatched among its Carolina League rivals. The Expos fell to last place and attendance fell to only 27,000 for the year. Montreal declared the experiment a failure and withdrew from Kinston following the 1974 season. With no major league sponsor and very little fan support, Kinston likewise withdrew from the league.

== Grainger Stadium ==
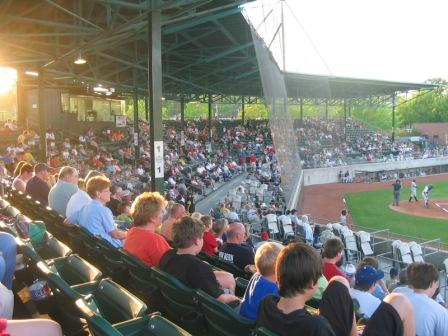
Grainger Grandstand, 2006.

The Kinston Expos, and all the Kinston teams since 1949, played their home games at Grainger Stadium located at 400 East Grainger Avenue in Kinston. The original structure was built by architect John J. Rowland in 1949 at a cost of $170,000 inclusive of everything except the land. $150,000 of the money was raised by bond issue. The stadium is owned by the city and leased by the team. A dedicatory plaque identifies the structure as "Municipal Stadium", but it has been called Grainger Stadium since it was first built. The name Grainger comes from its location on Grainger Avenue as well as its use early on by Grainger High School. Grainger is a prominent old family name in Lenoir County.

== Season-by-season results ==
Year	Name	League	Level	Affiliation	Record	Manager	Playoffs
1962	Eagles	Carolina	B	Pittsburgh Pirates	83–57	Pete Peterson	League Champs
1963	Eagles	Carolina	High-A	Pittsburgh Pirates	77–66	Pete Peterson	Lost in 1st round
1964	Eagles	Carolina	High-A	Pittsburgh Pirates	79–59	Pete Peterson	Lost in 1st round
1965	Eagles	Carolina	High-A	Pittsburgh Pirates	72–71	Bob Clear	
1966	Eagles	Carolina	High-A	Atlanta Braves	76–63	Andy Pafko	Lost in 1st round
1967	Eagles	Carolina	High-A	Atlanta Braves	60–75	Andy Pafko	
1968	Eagles	Carolina	High-A	New York Yankees	62–75	Bob Bauer	
1969	Eagles	Carolina	High-A	New York Yankees	74–68	Gene Hassell	Lost in 1st round
1970	Eagles	Carolina	High-A	New York Yankees	72–65	Alex Cosmidis	
1971	Eagles	Carolina	High-A	New York Yankees	83–52	Gene Hassell	Lost League Finals
1972	Eagles	Carolina	High-A	New York Yankees	73–64	Gene Hassell	Lost League Finals
1973	Eagles	Carolina	High-A	Co-op	68–69	Gene Hassell	
1974	Expos	Carolina	High-A	Montreal Expos	38–93	Jack Damaska	

== No Hitters ==
- Conrad Noessel (6/11/1966) vs the Tidewater Tides (7 innings)
- William Olsen (5/11/1970) vs the Burlington Senators
- Bob Elliott (6/14/1970) vs the Lynchburg Twins (7 innings)

== Bibliography ==
=== Autobiographies and biographies ===
- Blomberg, Ron; Schlossberg, Dan (2006). Designated Hebrew: The Ron Blomberg Story. Sports Publishing. pp. 30, 35. ISBN 1-58261-987-5.
- Guidry, Ron; Golenbock, Peter (1980). Guidry. Prentice-Hall, Inc. ISBN 0-13-371609-0.
- Hall, Donald; Ellis, Dock (1989) [1976]. Dock Ellis in the Country of Baseball. Simon & Schuster. ISBN 0-671-65988-X.

=== League histories ===
- Holaday, J. Chris (1998). Professional Baseball in North Carolina: An Illustrated City-by-City History, 1901–1996. McFarland & Company, Inc. ISBN 0-7864-0532-5.
- Lloyd, Johnson; Miles Wolff, eds. (2007). The Encyclopedia of Minor League Baseball, third ed. Baseball America, Inc. ISBN 978-1-932391-17-6.
- Sumner, Jim L. (1994). Separating the Men From the Boys: The First Half-Century of the Carolina League. John F. Blair. ISBN 0-89587-112-2.

=== Newspapers ===
- "The Kinston Daily Free Press". 1882–2011. – Issues are available at Lenoir Community College.

=== Official sources ===
- "Kinston Eagles/Expos Programs and Roster Sheets" – Programs are also referred to as yearbooks.
- Carolina League Record Book. Sports Vue. 1956–2011. – Over the years, this publication has also been known as Carolina League Media Guide and Record Book and Carolina League Directory and Record Book

== Footnotes ==
Preceded by Wilson Tobs; 1961	Carolina League Champions; Kinston Eagles; 1962	Succeeded by Wilson Tobs; 1963
