= 1952 Carolina League season =

- League: Carolina League
- Sport: Baseball
- Duration: April 16 – September 1
- Number of games: 140
- Number of teams: 8

Regular season
- Season MVP: Len Matarazzo, Fayetteville Athletics

Playoffs
- League champions: Reidsville Luckies
- Runners-up: Durham Bulls

CL seasons
- ← 1951 1953 →

The 1952 Carolina League was a Class B baseball season played between April 16 and September 1. Eight teams played a 140-game schedule, with the top four teams qualifying for the post-season.

The Reidsville Luckies won the Carolina League championship, defeating the Durham Bulls in the final round of the playoffs.

== Team changes ==
- The Burlington Bees are rebranded as the Burlington-Graham Pirates. The team relocated their home games to Graham High School in Graham, North Carolina. The club remained affiliated with the Pittsburgh Pirates.
- The Danville Leafs began an affiliation with the Washington Senators.

== Teams ==
1952 Carolina League
Team	City	MLB Affiliate	Stadium
Burlington-Graham Pirates	Graham, North Carolina	Pittsburgh Pirates	Graham High School
Danville Leafs	Danville, Virginia	Washington Senators	League Park
Durham Bulls	Durham, North Carolina	Detroit Tigers	Durham Athletic Park
Fayetteville Athletics	Fayetteville, North Carolina	Philadelphia Athletics	Pittman Stadium
Greensboro Patriots	Greensboro, North Carolina	Chicago Cubs	World War Memorial Stadium
Raleigh Capitals	Raleigh, North Carolina	None	Devereaux Meadow
Reidsville Luckies	Reidsville, North Carolina	None	Kiker Stadium
Winston-Salem Cardinals	Winston-Salem, North Carolina	St. Louis Cardinals	South Side Park

== Map of teams ==
Carolina League Teams

== Regular season ==
=== Summary ===
- The Raleigh Capitals finished with the best record in the regular season for the first time since 1948.

=== Standings ===
Carolina League
Team	Win	Loss	%	GB
Raleigh Capitals	79	57	.581	–
Durham Bulls	76	59	.563	2.5
Winston-Salem Cardinals	74	63	.540	5.5
Reidsville Luckies	74	64	.536	6
Greensboro Patriots	70	64	.522	8
Danville Leafs	65	74	.468	15.5
Fayetteville Athletics	63	73	.463	16
Burlington-Graham Pirates	45	92	.328	34.5

== League Leaders ==
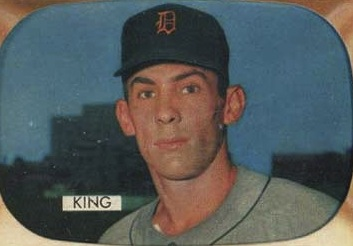
Chick King of the Durham Bulls led the league with 186 hits.

=== Batting leaders ===
Stat	Player	Total
AVG	Emil Karlik, Durham Bulls	.347
H	Chick King, Durham Bulls	186
R	Luis Morales, Danville Leafs	110
2B	Joseph Pancoe, Reidsville Luckies	44
3B	Scott Quackenbush, Greensboro Patriots	11
HR	Dale Powell, Danville Leafs	25
RBI	Paul Owens, Winston-Salem Cardinals; Dale Powell, Danville Leafs	105
SB	Jack Mitchell, Greensboro Patriots	47

=== Pitching leaders ===
Stat	Player	Total
W	Len Matarazzo, Fayetteville Athletics	22
ERA	Ron Necciai, Burlington-Graham Pirates	1.57
CG	Len Matarazzo, Fayetteville Athletics; Bernard Rossman, Raleigh Capitals	22
SHO	Len Matarazzo, Fayetteville Athletics	9
SO	Ron Necciai, Burlington-Graham Pirates	172
IP	Bob Hartig, Greensboro Patriots	254.0

== Playoffs ==
- The Reidsville Luckies won their first Carolina League championship, defeating the Durham Bulls in four games.
- The league semi-finals were shortened from a best-of-seven series to a best-of-five.

=== Playoff bracket ===
Semi-finals
1	Raleigh	0
4	Reidsville	3
2	Durham	3
3	Winston-Salem	0

Finals
4	Reidsville	4
2	Durham	0

== Awards ==
Carolina League awards
Award name	Recipient
Most Valuable Player	Len Matarazzo, Fayetteville Athletics
Manager of the Year	Herb Brett, Raleigh Capitals

== See also ==
- 1952 Major League Baseball season
