= 1953 Carolina League season =

- League: Carolina League
- Sport: Baseball
- Duration: April 22 – September 7
- Number of games: 140
- Number of teams: 8

Regular season
- Season MVP: Ramón Monzant, Danville Leafs

Playoffs
- League champions: Danville Leafs
- Runners-up: Reidsville Luckies

CL seasons
- ← 1952 1954 →

The 1953 Carolina League was a Class B baseball season played between April 22 and September 7. Eight teams played a 140-game schedule, with the top four teams qualifying for the post-season.

The Danville Leafs won the Carolina League championship, defeating the Reidsville Luckies in the final round of the playoffs.

== Team changes ==
- The Danville Leafs ended their affiliation with the Washington Senators and began a new affiliation with the New York Giants.
- The Fayetteville Athletics are rebranded as the Fayetteville Highlanders. The club remains affiliated with the Philadelphia Athletics.
- The Greensboro Patriots ended their affiliation with the Chicago Cubs and began a new affiliation with the Boston Red Sox.

== Teams ==
1953 Carolina League
| Team | City | MLB Affiliate | Stadium |
| Burlington-Graham Pirates | Graham, North Carolina | Pittsburgh Pirates | Graham High School |
| Danville Leafs | Danville, Virginia | New York Giants | League Park |
| Durham Bulls | Durham, North Carolina | Detroit Tigers | Durham Athletic Park |
| Fayetteville Highlanders | Fayetteville, North Carolina | Philadelphia Athletics | Pittman Stadium |
| Greensboro Patriots | Greensboro, North Carolina | Boston Red Sox | World War Memorial Stadium |
| Raleigh Capitals | Raleigh, North Carolina | None | Devereaux Meadow |
| Reidsville Luckies | Reidsville, North Carolina | None | Kiker Stadium |
| Winston-Salem Cardinals | Winston-Salem, North Carolina | St. Louis Cardinals | South Side Park |

== Map of teams ==
Carolina League Teams

== Regular season ==
=== Summary ===
- The Raleigh Capitals finished with the best record in the regular season for the second consecutive season.

=== Standings ===
Carolina League
| Team | Win | Loss | % | GB |
|---|---|---|---|---|
| Raleigh Capitals | 83 | 57 | .593 | – |
| Danville Leafs | 79 | 59 | .572 | 3 |
| Burlington-Graham Pirates | 75 | 65 | .536 | 8 |
| Reidsville Luckies | 73 | 66 | .525 | 9.5 |
| Greensboro Patriots | 70 | 70 | .500 | 13 |
| Winston-Salem Cardinals | 69 | 70 | .496 | 13.5 |
| Durham Bulls | 64 | 75 | .460 | 18.5 |
| Fayetteville Highlanders | 44 | 95 | .317 | 38.5 |

== League Leaders ==
=== Batting leaders ===
| Stat | Player | Total |
|---|---|---|
| AVG | John Radulovich, Durham Bulls | .349 |
| H | Jack Mitchell, Reidsville Luckies | 184 |
| R | George Hott, Burlington-Graham Pirates | 104 |
| 2B | Robert Caldwell, Danville Leafs | 43 |
| 3B | Jim Edwards, Raleigh Capitals | 13 |
| HR | Jack Hussey, Raleigh Capitals | 29 |
| RBI | Don Buddin, Greensboro Patriots | 123 |
| SB | Jack Mitchell, Reidsville Luckies | 52 |

=== Pitching leaders ===
| Stat | Player | Total |
|---|---|---|
| W | Ramón Monzant, Danville Leafs | 23 |
| ERA | Duane Wilson, Greensboro Patriots | 2.21 |
| CG | Joseph Micich, Reidsville Luckies; Eddie Neville, Durham Bulls | 23 |
| SHO | Albert Cleary, Raleigh Capitals; Duane Wilson, Greensboro Patriots | 5 |
| SO | Ramón Monzant, Danville Leafs | 232 |
| IP | Eddie Neville, Durham Bulls | 264.0 |

== Playoffs ==
- The Danville Leafs won their second Carolina League championship, defeating the Reidsville Luckies in six games.

=== Playoff bracket ===
Semi-finals
1 | Raleigh | 2
4 | Reidsville | 3
2 | Danville | 3
3 | Burlington-Graham | 1

Finals
4 | Reidsville | 2
2 | Danville | 4

== Awards ==
Carolina League awards
| Award name | Recipient |
|---|---|
| Most Valuable Player | Ramón Monzant, Danville Leafs |
| Manager of the Year | Herb Brett, Raleigh Capitals |

== See also ==
- 1953 Major League Baseball season
