= 1949 Carolina League season =

- League: Carolina League
- Sport: Baseball
- Duration: April 20 – September 11
- Number of games: 146
- Number of teams: 8
- Total attendance: 1,382,116
- Average attendance: 2,395

Regular season
- Season MVP: Muscle Shoals, Reidsville Luckies

Playoffs
- League champions: Burlington Bees
- Runners-up: Raleigh Capitals

CL seasons
- ← 1948 1950 →

The 1949 Carolina League was a Class B baseball season played between April 20 and September 11. Eight teams played a 146-game schedule, with the top four teams qualifying for the post-season.

The Burlington Bees won the Carolina League championship, defeating the Raleigh Capitals in the final round of the playoffs.

== League changes ==
- The Carolina League was reclassified from Class C to Class B beginning in the 1949 season.

== Teams ==
1949 Carolina League
Team	City	MLB Affiliate	Stadium
Burlington Bees	Burlington, North Carolina	None	Elon College Park
Danville Leafs	Danville, Virginia	None	League Park
Durham Bulls	Durham, North Carolina	Detroit Tigers	Durham Athletic Park
Greensboro Patriots	Greensboro, North Carolina	None	World War Memorial Stadium
Martinsville Athletics	Martinsville, Virginia	Philadelphia Athletics	Doug English Field
Raleigh Capitals	Raleigh, North Carolina	None	Devereaux Meadow
Reidsville Luckies	Reidsville, North Carolina	None	Kiker Stadium
Winston-Salem Cardinals	Winston-Salem, North Carolina	St. Louis Cardinals	South Side Park

== Map of teams ==
Carolina League Teams

== Regular season ==
=== Summary ===
- The Danville Leafs finished with the best record in the regular season for the first time since 1945.
- The regular season schedule was changed from 142-games to 146-games.
- Muscle Shoals of the Reidsville Luckies set a league record with 55 home runs.

=== Standings ===
Carolina League
Team	Win	Loss	%	GB
Danville Leafs	86	57	.601	–
Winston-Salem Cardinals	84	61	.579	3
Raleigh Capitals	76	68	.528	10.5
Burlington Bees	72	72	.500	14.5
Greensboro Patriots	72	73	.497	15
Durham Bulls	70	72	.493	15.5
Reidsville Luckies	63	80	.441	23
Martinsville Athletics	52	92	.361	34.5

== League Leaders ==
=== Batting leaders ===
Stat	Player	Total
AVG	William Brown, Danville Leafs	.361
H	William Brown, Danville Leafs	199
R	Muscle Shoals, Reidsville Luckies	131
2B	James Halkard, Greensboro Patriots	49
3B	Thomas Martin, Raleigh Capitals	15
HR	Muscle Shoals, Reidsville Luckies	55
RBI	Muscle Shoals, Reidsville Luckies	137
SB	Pat Haggerty, Durham Bulls	62

=== Pitching leaders ===
Stat	Player	Total
W	Eddie Neville, Durham Bulls	25
ERA	Adam Twarkins, Danville Leafs	2.07
CG	Eddie Neville, Durham Bulls; Adam Twarkins, Danville Leafs	25
SHO	Nick Lamastra, Greensboro Patriots	11
SO	Adam Twarkins, Danville Leafs	240
IP	Eddie Neville, Durham Bulls	274.0

== Playoffs ==
- The Burlington Bees won their first Carolina League championship, defeating the Raleigh Capitals in seven games.

=== Playoff bracket ===
Semi-finals
1	Danville	2
4	Burlington	4
2	Winston-Salem	0
3	Raleigh	4

Finals
4	Burlington	4
3	Raleigh	3

== Awards ==
Carolina League awards
Award name	Recipient
Most Valuable Player	Muscle Shoals, Reidsville Luckies
Manager of the Year	Ace Parker, Durham Bulls

== See also ==
- 1949 Major League Baseball season
