= 1954 Carolina League season =

- League: Carolina League
- Sport: Baseball
- Duration: April 21 – September 6
- Games: 140
- Teams: 8

Regular season
- Season MVP: Guy Morton Jr., Greensboro Patriots

Playoffs
- League champions: Fayetteville Highlanders
- Runners-up: Burlington-Graham Pirates

CL seasons
- ← 1953 1955 →

The 1954 Carolina League was a Class B baseball season played between April 21 and September 6. Eight teams played a 140-game schedule, with the top four teams qualifying for the post-season.

The Fayetteville Highlanders won the Carolina League championship, defeating the Burlington-Graham Pirates in the final round of the playoffs.

== Team changes ==
- The Raleigh Capitals fold.
- The High Point-Thomasville Hi-Toms joined the league from the Tar Heel League and begin an affiliation with the Cincinnati Redlegs.
- The Fayetteville Highlanders ended their affiliation with the Philadelphia Athletics.
- The Winston-Salem Cardinals are renamed the Winston-Salem Twins. The club ended their affiliation with the St. Louis Cardinals.

== Teams ==
1954 Carolina League
Team	City	MLB Affiliate	Stadium
Burlington-Graham Pirates	Graham, North Carolina	Pittsburgh Pirates	Graham High School
Danville Leafs	Danville, Virginia	New York Giants	League Park
Durham Bulls	Durham, North Carolina	Detroit Tigers	Durham Athletic Park
Fayetteville Highlanders	Fayetteville, North Carolina	None	Pittman Stadium
Greensboro Patriots	Greensboro, North Carolina	Boston Red Sox	World War Memorial Stadium
High Point-Thomasville Hi-Toms	Thomasville, North Carolina	Cincinnati Redlegs	Finch Field
Reidsville Luckies	Reidsville, North Carolina	None	Kiker Stadium
Winston-Salem Twins	Winston-Salem, North Carolina	None	South Side Park

== Map of teams ==
Carolina League Teams

== Regular season ==
=== Summary ===
- The Fayetteville Highlanders finished with the best record in the regular season for the first time in team history.

=== Standings ===
Carolina League
Team	Win	Loss	%	GB
Fayetteville Highlanders	86	51	.628	–
Burlington-Graham Pirates	82	56	.594	4.5
Greensboro Patriots	79	59	.572	7.5
Durham Bulls	70	68	.507	16.5
Danville Leafs	70	69	.504	17
High Point-Thomasville Hi-Toms	66	73	.475	21
Reidsville Luckies	56	83	.403	31
Winston-Salem Twins	44	94	.319	42.5

== League Leaders ==
=== Batting leaders ===
Stat	Player	Total
AVG	Guy Morton Jr., Greensboro Patriots	.348
H	Steve Demeter, Durham Bulls	169
R	Robert Lyons, Fayetteville Highlanders	108
2B	Steve Demeter, Durham Bulls	48
3B	Bobby Phillips, Reidsville Luckies	10
HR	James Pokel, Fayetteville Highlanders	38
RBI	Guy Morton Jr., Greensboro Patriots	120
SB	Gene Hassell, Burlington-Graham Pirates	47

=== Pitching leaders ===
Stat	Player	Total
W	Curt Barclay, Danville Leafs; Robert Cruze, Durham Bulls	19
ERA	John Patula, Greensboro Patriots	1.58
CG	Curt Barclay, Danville Leafs	23
SHO	John Patula, Greensboro Patriots	6
SO	Don Schultz, Burlington-Graham Pirates	178
IP	Curt Barclay, Danville Leafs	248.0

== Playoffs ==
- The Fayetteville Highlanders won their first Carolina League championship, defeating the Burlington-Graham Pirates in five games.

=== Playoff bracket ===
Semi-finals
1	Fayetteville	3
4	Durham	1
2	Burlington-Graham	3
3	Greensboro	2

Finals
1	Fayetteville	4
2	Burlington-Graham	1

== Awards ==
Carolina League awards
Award name	Recipient
Most Valuable Player	Guy Morton Jr., Greensboro Patriots
Manager of the Year	Stan Wentzel, Burlington-Graham Pirates

== See also ==
- 1954 Major League Baseball season
