= 1948 Carolina League season =

- League: Carolina League
- Sport: Baseball
- Duration: April 20 – September 7
- Number of games: 142
- Number of teams: 8
- Total attendance: 1,327,907
- Average attendance: 2,325

Regular season
- Season MVP: Lewis Hester, Reidsville Luckies

Playoffs
- League champions: Martinsville Athletics
- Runners-up: Burlington Bees

CL seasons
- ← 1947 1949 →

The 1948 Carolina League was a Class C baseball season played between April 20 and September 7. Eight teams played a 142-game schedule, with the top four teams qualifying for the post-season.

The Martinsville Athletics won the Carolina League championship, defeating the Burlington Bees in the final round of the playoffs.

== Team changes ==
- The Leaksville-Draper-Spray Triplets left the league and joined the Blue Ridge League.
- The Reidsville Luckies join the league from the Tri-State League.
- The Danville Leafs ended their affiliation with the New York Giants.
- The Durham Bulls begin an affiliation with the Detroit Tigers.

== Teams ==
1948 Carolina League
Team	City	MLB Affiliate	Stadium
Burlington Bees	Burlington, North Carolina	None	Elon College Park
Danville Leafs	Danville, Virginia	None	League Park
Durham Bulls	Durham, North Carolina	Detroit Tigers	Durham Athletic Park
Greensboro Patriots	Greensboro, North Carolina	None	World War Memorial Stadium
Martinsville Athletics	Martinsville, Virginia	Philadelphia Athletics	Doug English Field
Raleigh Capitals	Raleigh, North Carolina	None	Devereaux Meadow
Reidsville Luckies	Reidsville, North Carolina	None	Kiker Stadium
Winston-Salem Cardinals	Winston-Salem, North Carolina	St. Louis Cardinals	South Side Park

== Map of teams ==
Carolina League Teams

== Regular season ==
=== Summary ===
- The Raleigh Capitals finished with the best record in the regular season for the first time in franchise history.
- The Danville Leafs defeated the Winston-Salem Cardinals in a tie-breaking game to clinch the final playoff berth.

=== Standings ===
Carolina League
Team	Win	Loss	%	GB
Raleigh Capitals	84	58	.592	–
Martinsville Athletics	81	61	.570	3
Burlington Bees	80	62	.563	4
Danville Leafs	77	64	.546	6.5
Winston-Salem Cardinals	76	65	.539	7.5
Durham Bulls	63	79	.444	21
Reidsville Luckies	57	85	.401	27
Greensboro Patriots	49	93	.345	35

== League Leaders ==
=== Batting leaders ===
Stat	Player	Total
AVG	Eddie Morgan, Martinsville Athletics	.373
H	Emo Showfety, Greensboro Patriots	191
R	George Wright, Martinsville Athletics	145
2B	Crash Davis, Durham Bulls	50
3B	James Lamb, Greensboro Patriots; George Wright, Martinsville Athletics	16
HR	Russ Sullivan, Danville Leafs	35
RBI	Russ Sullivan, Danville Leafs	129
SB	Thomas Martin, Raleigh Capitals	39

=== Pitching leaders ===
Stat	Player	Total
W	Lewis Hester, Reidsville Luckies	25
ERA	Alvin Henencheck, Raleigh Capitals	2.24
CG	Lewis Hester, Reidsville Luckies	27
SHO	Alvin Henencheck, Raleigh Capitals; Oswald Kolwe, Durham Bulls; Herbert Whitcomb, Martinsville Athletics	4
SO	Jack Frisinger, Winston-Salem Cardinals	234
IP	Lewis Hester, Reidsville Luckies	301.0

== Playoffs ==
- The Martinsville Athletics won their first Carolina League championship, defeating the Burlington Bees in six games.

=== Playoff bracket ===
Semi-finals
1	Raleigh	2
3	Burlington	4
2	Martinsville	4
4	Danville	1

Finals
3	Burlington	2
2	Martinsville	4

== Awards ==
Carolina League awards
Award name	Recipient
Most Valuable Player	Lewis Hester, Reidsville Luckies
Manager of the Year	Bud Bates, Burlington Bees

== See also ==
- 1948 Major League Baseball season
