= 1951 Carolina League season =

- League: Carolina League
- Sport: Baseball
- Duration: April 18 – September 3
- Games: 140
- Teams: 8

Regular season
- Season MVP: Ray Jablonski, Winston-Salem Cardinals

Playoffs
- League champions: Winston-Salem Cardinals
- Runners-up: Reidsville Luckies

CL seasons
- ← 1950 1952 →

The 1951 Carolina League was a Class B baseball season played between April 18 and September 3. Eight teams played a 140-game schedule, with the top four teams qualifying for the post-season.

The Winston-Salem Cardinals won the Carolina League championship, defeating the Reidsville Luckies in the final round of the playoffs.

== Team changes ==
- The Burlington Bees began an affiliation with the Pittsburgh Pirates.
- The Greensboro Patriots began an affiliation with the Chicago Cubs.

== Teams ==
1951 Carolina League
Team	City	MLB Affiliate	Stadium
Burlington Bees	Burlington, North Carolina	Pittsburgh Pirates	Elon College Park
Danville Leafs	Danville, Virginia	None	League Park
Durham Bulls	Durham, North Carolina	Detroit Tigers	Durham Athletic Park
Fayetteville Athletics	Fayetteville, North Carolina	Philadelphia Athletics	Pittman Stadium
Greensboro Patriots	Greensboro, North Carolina	Chicago Cubs	World War Memorial Stadium
Raleigh Capitals	Raleigh, North Carolina	None	Devereaux Meadow
Reidsville Luckies	Reidsville, North Carolina	None	Kiker Stadium
Winston-Salem Cardinals	Winston-Salem, North Carolina	St. Louis Cardinals	South Side Park

== Map of teams ==
Carolina League Teams

== Regular season ==
=== Summary ===
- The Durham Bulls finished with the best record in the regular season for the first time since in team history.
- The regular season schedule was shortened from 154-games to 140-games.

=== Standings ===
Carolina League
Team	Win	Loss	%	GB
Durham Bulls	84	56	.600	–
Winston-Salem Cardinals	81	58	.583	2.5
Raleigh Capitals	78	62	.557	6
Reidsville Luckies	76	64	.543	8
Greensboro Patriots	67	73	.479	17
Danville Leafs	66	73	.475	17.5
Fayetteville Athletics	59	79	.428	24
Burlington Bees	47	93	.336	37

== League Leaders ==
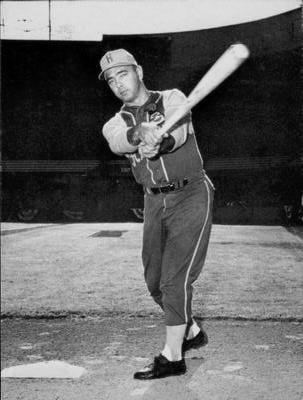
Ray Jablonski led the league in batting average, hits, doubles, runs batted in and tied for the league lead in home runs as he won the MVP Award.

=== Batting leaders ===
Stat	Player	Total
AVG	Ray Jablonski, Winston-Salem Cardinals	.363
H	Ray Jablonski, Winston-Salem Cardinals	200
R	Hank Navarro, Durham Bulls	116
2B	Ray Jablonski, Winston-Salem Cardinals	45
3B	Joe Cunningham, Winston-Salem Cardinals	11
HR	Ray Jablonski, Winston-Salem Cardinals; Carl Miller, Reidsville Luckies	28
RBI	Ray Jablonski, Winston-Salem Cardinals	127
SB	Herb Mancini, Winston-Salem Cardinals	36

=== Pitching leaders ===
Stat	Player	Total
W	Mike Forline, Reidsville Luckies	21
ERA	Jim Lewey, Winston-Salem Cardinals	2.65
CG	Mike Forline, Reidsville Luckies	21
SHO	Jim Lewey, Winston-Salem Cardinals; John McPadden, Durham Bulls	5
SO	Dennis Reeder, Winston-Salem Cardinals	155
IP	Mike Forline, Reidsville Luckies	264.0

== Playoffs ==
- The Winston-Salem Cardinals won their second consecutive Carolina League championship, defeating the Reidsville Luckies in five games.
- The league semi-finals were lengthened from a best-of-five series to a best-of-seven.

=== Playoff bracket ===
Semi-finals
1	Durham	1
4	Reidsville	4
2	Winston-Salem	4
3	Raleigh	0

Finals
4	Reidsville	1
2	Winston-Salem	4

== Awards ==
Carolina League awards
Award name	Recipient
Most Valuable Player	Ray Jablonski, Winston-Salem Cardinals
Manager of the Year	Ace Parker, Durham Bulls

== See also ==
- 1951 Major League Baseball season
