= 1950 Carolina League season =

- League: Carolina League
- Sport: Baseball
- Duration: April 19 – September 14
- Number of games: 154
- Number of teams: 8
- Total attendance: 1,442,322
- Average attendance: 2,356

Regular season
- Season MVP: William Evans, Burlington Bees

Playoffs
- League champions: Winston-Salem Cardinals
- Runners-up: Burlington Bees

CL seasons
- ← 1949 1951 →

The 1950 Carolina League was a Class B baseball season played between April 19 and September 14. Eight teams played a 154-game schedule, with the top four teams qualifying for the post-season.

The Winston-Salem Cardinals won the Carolina League championship, defeating the Burlington Bees in the final round of the playoffs.

== Team changes ==
- The Martinsville Athletics relocated to Fayetteville, North Carolina, and were renamed the Fayetteville Athletics. The club remained affiliated with the Philadelphia Athletics.

== Teams ==
1950 Carolina League
Team	City	MLB Affiliate	Stadium
Burlington Bees	Burlington, North Carolina	None	Elon College Park
Danville Leafs	Danville, Virginia	None	League Park
Durham Bulls	Durham, North Carolina	Detroit Tigers	Durham Athletic Park
Fayetteville Athletics	Fayetteville, North Carolina	Philadelphia Athletics	Pittman Stadium
Greensboro Patriots	Greensboro, North Carolina	None	World War Memorial Stadium
Raleigh Capitals	Raleigh, North Carolina	None	Devereaux Meadow
Reidsville Luckies	Reidsville, North Carolina	None	Kiker Stadium
Winston-Salem Cardinals	Winston-Salem, North Carolina	St. Louis Cardinals	South Side Park

== Map of teams ==
Carolina League Teams

== Regular season ==
=== Summary ===
- The Winston-Salem Cardinals finished with the best record in the regular season for the first time since in team history.
- The Winston-Salem Cardinals set a league record with 106 victories during the season.

=== Standings ===
Carolina League
Team	Win	Loss	%	GB
Winston-Salem Cardinals	106	47	.693	–
Danville Leafs	87	66	.569	19
Burlington Bees	83	70	.542	23
Reidsville Luckies	82	72	.532	24.5
Greensboro Patriots	78	74	.513	27.5
Durham Bulls	73	79	.480	32.5
Raleigh Capitals	55	97	.362	50.5
Fayetteville Athletics	47	106	.307	59

== League Leaders ==
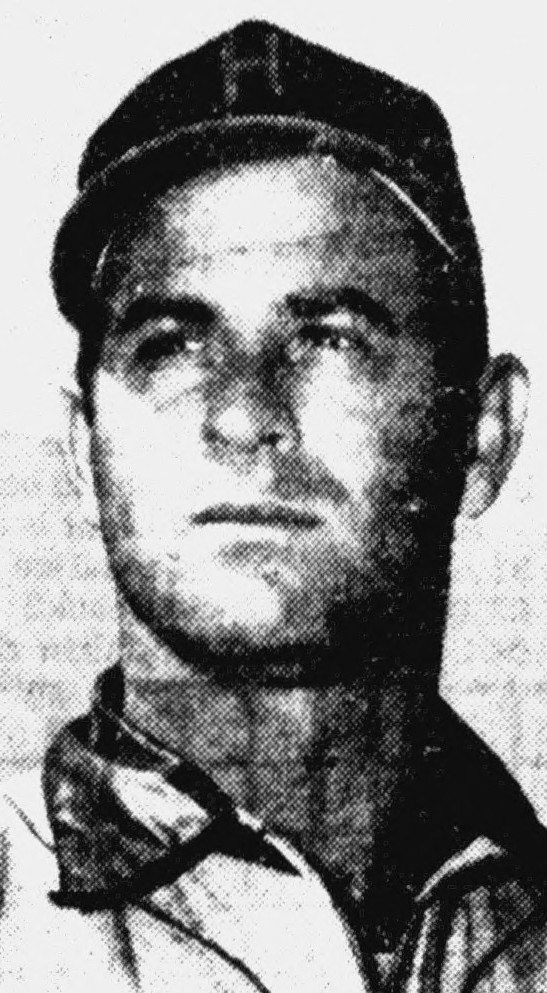
Fred Vaughn of the Greensboro Patriots led the league with 27 home runs.

=== Batting leaders ===
Stat	Player	Total
AVG	William Evans, Burlington Bees	.338
H	William Evans, Burlington Bees	207
R	Jack Huesman, Winston-Salem Cardinals	116
2B	Pat Cooper, Burlington Bees; Russ Rac, Winston-Salem Cardinals	35
3B	William Evans, Burlington Bees	14
HR	Fred Vaughn, Greensboro Patriots	27
RBI	Woody Fair, Danville Leafs	103
SB	Jack Huesman, Winston-Salem Cardinals	43

=== Pitching leaders ===
Stat	Player	Total
W	Peter Angell, Danville Leafs; Lee Peterson, Winston-Salem Cardinals	21
ERA	Robert Cruze, Durham Bulls	2.31
CG	Woody Rich, Greensboro Patriots	24
SHO	Woody Rich, Greensboro Patriots	6
SO	Vinegar Bend Mizell, Winston-Salem Cardinals	227
IP	Charley Miller, Raleigh Capitals	280.0

== Playoffs ==
- The Winston-Salem Cardinals won their first Carolina League championship, defeating the Burlington Bees in five games.
- The league semi-finals were shortened from a best-of-seven series to a best-of-five.

=== Playoff bracket ===
Semi-finals
1	Winston-Salem	3
4	Reidsville	2
2	Danville	2
3	Burlington	3

Finals
1	Winston-Salem	4
3	Burlington	1

== Awards ==
Carolina League awards
Award name	Recipient
Most Valuable Player	William Evans, Burlington Bees
Manager of the Year	George Kissell, Winston-Salem Cardinals

== See also ==
- 1950 Major League Baseball season
