= 1955 Carolina League season =

- League: Carolina League
- Sport: Baseball
- Duration: April 20 – September 5
- Number of games: 140
- Number of teams: 8

Regular season
- Season MVP: Danny Morejón, High Point-Thomasville Hi-Toms

Playoffs
- League champions: Danville Leafs
- Runners-up: High Point-Thomasville Hi-Toms

CL seasons
- ← 1954 1956 →

The 1955 Carolina League was a Class B baseball season played between April 20 and September 5. Eight teams played a 140-game schedule, with the top four teams qualifying for the post-season.

The Danville Leafs won the Carolina League championship, defeating the High Point-Thomasville Hi-Toms in the final round of the playoffs.

== Team changes ==
- The Fayetteville Highlanders begin an affiliation with the Baltimore Orioles.
- The Reidsville Luckies are renamed the Reidsville Phillies and begin an affiliation with the Philadelphia Phillies.
- The Winston-Salem Twins begin an affiliation with the New York Yankees.

== Teams ==
1955 Carolina League
Team	City	MLB Affiliate	Stadium
Burlington-Graham Pirates	Graham, North Carolina	Pittsburgh Pirates	Graham High School
Danville Leafs	Danville, Virginia	New York Giants	League Park
Durham Bulls	Durham, North Carolina	Detroit Tigers	Durham Athletic Park
Fayetteville Highlanders	Fayetteville, North Carolina	Baltimore Orioles	Pittman Stadium
Greensboro Patriots	Greensboro, North Carolina	Boston Red Sox	World War Memorial Stadium
High Point-Thomasville Hi-Toms	Thomasville, North Carolina	Cincinnati Redlegs	Finch Field
Reidsville Phillies	Reidsville, North Carolina	Philadelphia Phillies	Kiker Stadium
Winston-Salem Twins	Winston-Salem, North Carolina	New York Yankees	South Side Park

== Map of teams ==
Carolina League Teams

== Regular season ==
=== Summary ===
- The High Point-Thomasville Hi-Toms finished with the best record in the regular season for the first time in team history.

=== Standings ===
Carolina League
Team	Win	Loss	%	GB
High Point-Thomasville Hi-Toms	80	58	.580	–
Danville Leafs	73	64	.533	6.5
Fayetteville Highlanders	70	67	.511	9.5
Durham Bulls	69	69	.500	11
Reidsville Phillies	68	70	.493	12
Greensboro Patriots	66	72	.478	14
Winston-Salem Twins	65	73	.471	15
Burlington-Graham Pirates	60	78	.435	18

== League Leaders ==
=== Batting leaders ===
Stat	Player	Total
AVG	Danny Morejón, High Point-Thomasville Hi-Toms	.324
H	Richard McCarthy, Greensboro Patriots	172
R	Joseph LaMonica, Greensboro Patriots	111
2B	Joseph Cristello, Fayetteville Highlanders; Jim McManus, Durham Bulls	34
3B	Joseph LaMonica, Greensboro Patriots	13
HR	Harold Holland, Danville Leafs	31
RBI	Harold Holland, Danville Leafs	121
SB	Joseph LaMonica, Greensboro Patriots	34

=== Pitching leaders ===
Stat	Player	Total
W	Woody Rich, High Point-Thomasville Hi-Toms	19
ERA	Jack Taylor, High Point-Thomasville Hi-Toms	1.78
CG	Jack Taylor, High Point-Thomasville Hi-Toms	23
SHO	Jack Taylor, High Point-Thomasville Hi-Toms	8
SO	John Fitzgerald, Danville Leafs	233
IP	Jack Taylor, High Point-Thomasville Hi-Toms	263.0

== Playoffs ==
- The Danville Leafs won their third Carolina League championship, defeating the High Point-Thomasville Hi-Toms in six games.
- The semi-finals were extended from a best-of-five series to a best-of-seven series.

=== Playoff bracket ===
Semi-finals
1	High Point-Thomasville	4
4	Durham	3
2	Danville	4
3	Fayetteville	1

Finals
1	High Point-Thomasville	2
2	Danville	4

== Awards ==
Carolina League awards
Award name	Recipient
Most Valuable Player	Danny Morejón, High Point-Thomasville Hi-Toms
Manager of the Year	Jimmy Brown, High Point-Thomasville Hi-Toms

== See also ==
- 1955 Major League Baseball season
