= 1946 Carolina League season =

- League: Carolina League
- Sport: Baseball
- Duration: April 24 – September 9
- Number of games: 142
- Number of teams: 8

Regular season

Playoffs
- League champions: Raleigh Capitals
- Runners-up: Durham Bulls

CL seasons
- ← 1945 1947 →

The 1946 Carolina League was a Class C baseball season played between April 24 and September 9. Eight teams played a 142-game schedule, with the top four teams qualifying for the post-season.

The Raleigh Capitals won the Carolina League championship, defeating the Durham Bulls in the final round of the playoffs.

== Team changes ==
- The Durham Bulls ended their affiliation with the Boston Red Sox.
- The Leaksville-Draper-Spray Triplets ended their affiliation with the Chicago Cubs.
- The Greensboro Patriots ended their affiliation with the Philadelphia Phillies.
- The Raleigh Capitals ended their affiliation with the Cincinnati Reds and began an affiliation with the Boston Braves.

== Teams ==
1946 Carolina League
Team	City	MLB Affiliate	Stadium
Burlington Bees	Burlington, North Carolina	None	Elon College Park
Danville Leafs	Danville, Virginia	New York Giants	League Park
Durham Bulls	Durham, North Carolina	None	Durham Athletic Park
Greensboro Patriots	Greensboro, North Carolina	None	World War Memorial Stadium
Leaksville-Draper-Spray Triplets	Leaksville, North Carolina	None	Tri-City Baseball Park
Martinsville Athletics	Martinsville, Virginia	Philadelphia Athletics	Doug English Field
Raleigh Capitals	Raleigh, North Carolina	Boston Braves	Devereaux Meadow
Winston-Salem Cardinals	Winston-Salem, North Carolina	St. Louis Cardinals	South Side Park

== Map of teams ==
Carolina League Teams

== Regular season ==
=== Summary ===
- The Greensboro Patriots finished with the best record in the regular season for the first time in franchise history.
- The regular season schedule was lengthened from 138-games to 142-games.

=== Standings ===
Carolina League
Team	Win	Loss	%	GB
Greensboro Patriots	85	57	.599	–
Raleigh Capitals	80	62	.563	5
Durham Bulls	80	62	.563	5
Burlington Bees	69	71	.493	15
Winston-Salem Cardinals	68	72	.486	16
Martinsville Athletics	67	75	.472	18
Danville Leafs	60	82	.423	25
Leaksville-Draper-Spray Triplets	57	85	.401	28

== League Leaders ==
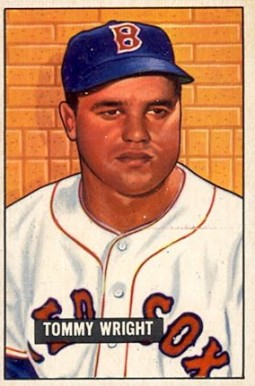
Tom Wright of the Durham Bulls led the league in batting average, hits and runs.

=== Batting leaders ===
Stat	Player	Total
AVG	Tom Wright, Durham Bulls	.380
H	Tom Wright, Durham Bulls	200
R	Woody Fair, Durham Bulls	161
2B	Woody Fair, Durham Bulls	51
3B	Don Butzer, Greensboro Patriots	15
HR	Gus Zernial, Burlington Bees	41
RBI	Woody Fair, Durham Bulls	161
SB	Hilliard Nance, Martinsville Athletics	61

=== Pitching leaders ===
Stat	Player	Total
W	Frank Paulin, Leaksville-Draper-Spray Triplets; Roy Pinyoun, Raleigh Capitals	19
CG	Frank Paulin, Leaksville-Draper-Spray Triplets	31
SHO	Harry Byrd, Martinsville Athletics; Kenneth Deal, Burlington Bees	3
SO	Frank Paulin, Leaksville-Draper-Spray Triplets	220
IP	Frank Paulin, Leaksville-Draper-Spray Triplets	303.0

== Playoffs ==
- The Raleigh Capitals won their first Carolina League championship, defeating the Durham Bulls in six games.

=== Playoff bracket ===
Semi-finals
1	Greensboro	2
3	Durham	4
2	Raleigh	4
4	Burlington	2

Finals
3	Durham	2
2	Raleigh	4

== Awards ==
Carolina League awards
Award name	Recipient
Manager of the Year	Floyd Patterson, Durham Bulls

== See also ==
- 1946 Major League Baseball season
