= 1947 Carolina League season =

- League: Carolina League
- Sport: Baseball
- Duration: April 23 – September 8
- Number of games: 142
- Number of teams: 8
- Total attendance: 1,901,733
- Average attendance: 3,354

Regular season

Playoffs
- League champions: Raleigh Capitals
- Runners-up: Durham Bulls

CL seasons
- ← 1946 1948 →

The 1947 Carolina League was a Class C baseball season played between April 23 and September 8. Eight teams played a 142-game schedule, with the top four teams qualifying for the post-season.

The Raleigh Capitals won the Carolina League championship, defeating the Durham Bulls in the final round of the playoffs.

== Team changes ==
- The Raleigh Capitals ended their affiliation with the Boston Braves.

== Teams ==
1947 Carolina League
Team	City	MLB Affiliate	Stadium
Burlington Bees	Burlington, North Carolina	None	Elon College Park
Danville Leafs	Danville, Virginia	New York Giants	League Park
Durham Bulls	Durham, North Carolina	None	Durham Athletic Park
Greensboro Patriots	Greensboro, North Carolina	None	World War Memorial Stadium
Leaksville-Draper-Spray Triplets	Leaksville, North Carolina	None	Tri-City Baseball Park
Martinsville Athletics	Martinsville, Virginia	Philadelphia Athletics	Doug English Field
Raleigh Capitals	Raleigh, North Carolina	None	Devereaux Meadow
Winston-Salem Cardinals	Winston-Salem, North Carolina	St. Louis Cardinals	South Side Park

== Map of teams ==
Carolina League Teams

== Regular season ==
=== Summary ===
- The Burlington Bees finished with the best record in the regular season for the first time in franchise history.

=== Standings ===
Carolina League
Team	Win	Loss	%	GB
Burlington Bees	87	55	.613	–
Winston-Salem Cardinals	85	57	.599	2
Raleigh Capitals	81	60	.574	5.5
Durham Bulls	70	71	.496	16.5
Greensboro Patriots	65	75	.464	21
Danville Leafs	65	77	.458	22
Leaksville-Draper-Spray Triplets	59	82	.418	27.5
Martinsville Athletics	53	88	.376	33.5

== League Leaders ==
=== Batting leaders ===
Stat	Player	Total
AVG	Harry Sullivan, Raleigh Capitals	.391
H	Harry Sullivan, Raleigh Capitals	200
R	Turkey Tyson, Durham Bulls	138
2B	Willie Duke, Durham Bulls; Robert Worthington, Winston-Salem Cardinals	42
3B	Charles Woddail, Burlington Bees	16
HR	Gene Petty, Danville Leafs	31
RBI	Steve Bilko, Winston-Salem Cardinals	120
SB	Joseph Muzzo, Winston-Salem Cardinals	39

=== Pitching leaders ===
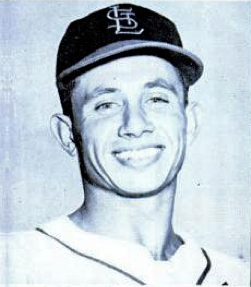
Harvey Haddix of the Winston-Salem Cardinals led the league with a 1.90 ERA.

Stat	Player	Total
W	Kenneth Deal, Burlington Bees	23
ERA	Harvey Haddix, Winston-Salem Cardinals	1.90
CG	Pete Bryant, Burlington Bees	28
SHO	Kenneth Deal, Burlington Bees; Thurman Lowe, Danville Leafs	4
SO	Kenneth Deal, Burlington Bees	275
IP	Pete Bryant, Burlington Bees	292.0

== Playoffs ==
- The Raleigh Capitals won their second consecutive Carolina League championship, defeating the Durham Bulls in six games.

=== Playoff bracket ===
Semi-finals
1	Burlington	3
3	Raleigh	4
2	Winston-Salem	2
4	Durham	4

Finals
3	Raleigh	4
4	Durham	2

== Awards ==
Carolina League awards
Award name	Recipient
Manager of the Year	Bud Bates, Burlington Bees

== See also ==
- 1947 Major League Baseball season
