= 1945 Carolina League season =

- League: Carolina League
- Sport: Baseball
- Duration: April 26 – September 9
- Number of games: 138
- Number of teams: 8

Regular season

Playoffs
- League champions: Danville Leafs
- Runners-up: Raleigh Capitals

CL seasons
- 1946 →

The 1945 Carolina League was a Class C baseball season played between April 26 and September 9. Eight teams played a 138-game schedule, with the top four teams qualifying for the post-season.

The Danville Leafs won the Carolina League championship, defeating the Raleigh Capitals in the final round of the playoffs.

== Formation of league ==
The Carolina League was announced on October 29, 1944, after an organizational meeting at Durham, North Carolina. It was a successor to the Class D Bi-State League that existed before World War II. The league began play in 1945 with eight teams based in Burlington, Durham, Greensboro, Leaksville, Raleigh, Winston-Salem (all from North Carolina), along with Danville and Martinsville from Virginia.

== Teams ==
1945 Carolina League
Team	City	MLB Affiliate	Stadium
Burlington Bees	Burlington, North Carolina	None	Elon College Park
Danville Leafs	Danville, Virginia	New York Giants	League Park
Durham Bulls	Durham, North Carolina	Boston Red Sox	Durham Athletic Park
Greensboro Patriots	Greensboro, North Carolina	Philadelphia Phillies	World War Memorial Stadium
Leaksville-Draper-Spray Triplets	Leaksville, North Carolina	Chicago Cubs	Tri-City Baseball Park
Martinsville Athletics	Martinsville, Virginia	Philadelphia Athletics	Doug English Field
Raleigh Capitals	Raleigh, North Carolina	Cincinnati Reds	Devereaux Meadow
Winston-Salem Cardinals	Winston-Salem, North Carolina	St. Louis Cardinals	South Side Park

== Map of teams ==
Carolina League Teams

== Regular season ==
=== Summary ===
- The Danville Leafs finished with the best record in the regular season.

=== Standings ===
Carolina League
Team	Win	Loss	%	GB
Danville Leafs	94	44	.681	–
Raleigh Capitals	78	60	.565	16
Martinsville Athletics	69	67	.507	24
Burlington Bees	67	70	.489	26.5
Leaksville-Draper-Spray Triplets	66	70	.485	27
Winston-Salem Cardinals	61	76	.445	32.5
Durham Bulls	59	77	.434	34
Greensboro Patriots	53	83	.390	40

== League Leaders ==
=== Batting leaders ===
Stat	Player	Total
AVG	Glenn Brundis, Danville Leafs	.366
H	Jaime Almendro, Danville Leafs; Glenn Brundis, Danville Leafs	193
R	Jaime Almendro, Danville Leafs	139
2B	Jon Carenbauer, Danville Leafs	45
3B	Jaime Almendro, Danville Leafs	17
HR	Mike Abrams, Martinsville Athletics; August Granzig, Leaksville-Draper-Spray Triplets; Jerry Gutt, Martinsville Athletics; Tom Kirk, Martinsville Athletics	12
RBI	Jon Carenbauer, Danville Leafs	121
SB	Lewis King, Danville Leafs	65

=== Pitching leaders ===
Stat	Player	Total
W	Art Fowler, Danville Leafs	23
ERA	Charles Timm, Raleigh Capitals	2.36
CG	Art Fowler, Danville Leafs	27
SHO	Charles Timm, Raleigh Capitals	4
SO	Charles Gooding, Winston-Salem Cardinals	230
IP	Roy Pinyoun, Raleigh Capitals	265.0

== Playoffs ==
- The Danville Leafs won their first Carolina League championship, defeating the Raleigh Capitals in five games.

=== Playoff bracket ===
Semi-finals
1	Danville	4
3	Martinsville	2
2	Raleigh	4
4	Burlington	3

Finals
1	Danville	4
2	Raleigh	1

== Awards ==
Carolina League awards
Award name	Recipient
Manager of the Year	Herb Brett, Danville Leafs

== See also ==
- 1945 Major League Baseball season
