= Burlington Indians =

Burlington Indians may refer to:

- Burlington Royals, known as the Burlington Indians from 1986 to 2006
- Burlington Rangers, known as the Burlington Indians from 1958 to 1964
- Burlington Bees, known as the Burlington Indians from 1947 to 1949
