= Durham Farmers' Market =

Coordinates: 36.00038°N 78.90152°W

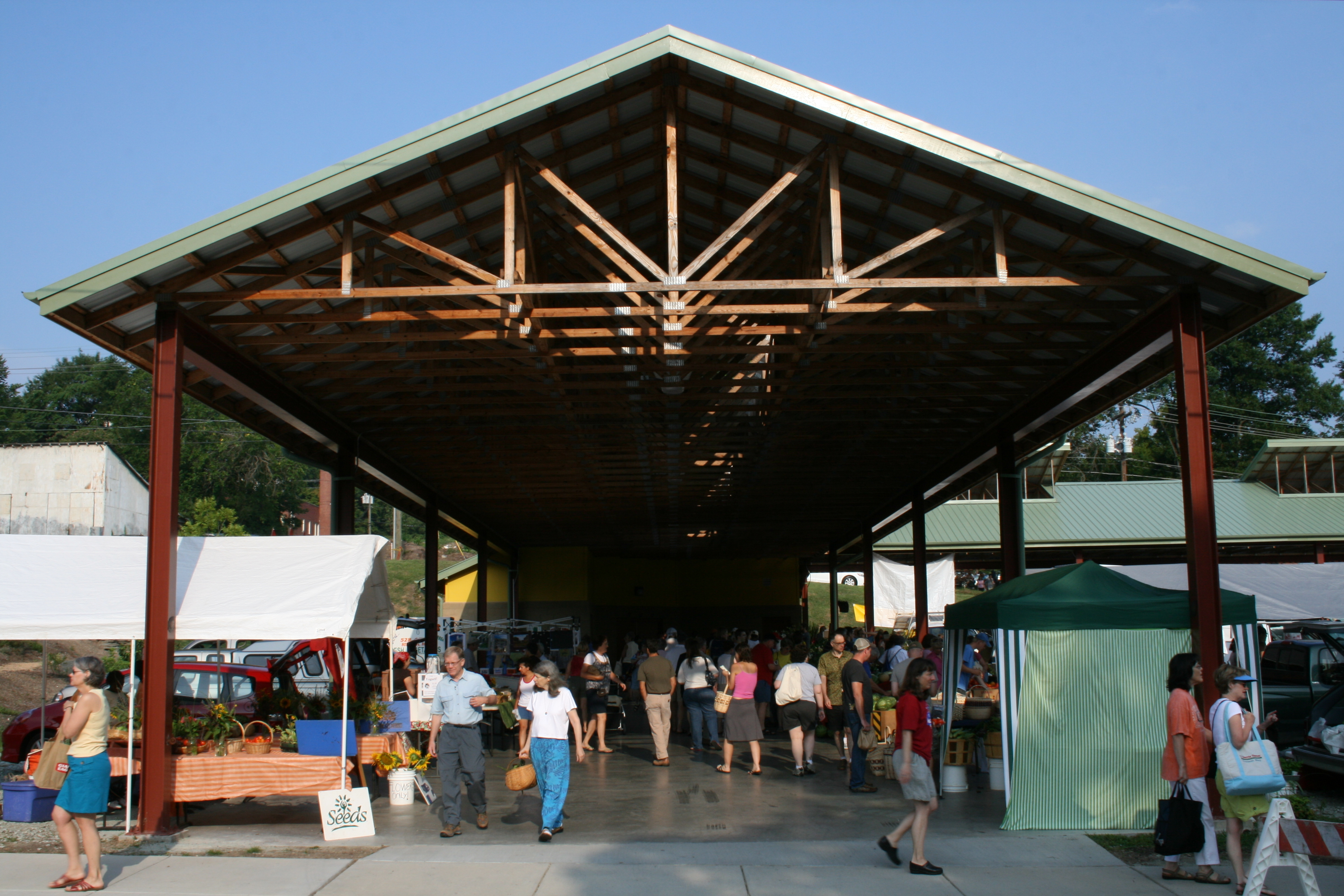
Durham Farmers' Market, July 2008

The Durham Farmers' Market is a producer-only farmer's market located in Durham, North Carolina, established in 1998. As part of the Market's emphasis on locally produced produce, crafts and flowers, items sold by the Market's vendors are restricted to traveling no more than 70 miles (112.7 km) on its journey to Durham.

== Impact ==
The Market's founding in 1998 coincided with a renaissance of downtown Durham, including the founding of Durham Central Park (2001), American Tobacco Campus (2004) and West Village (2000), as well as the opening of a number of highly regarded restaurants with an emphasis on locally sourced produce, that resulted in Durham being named "America's Foodiest Small Town" by Bon Appétit in 2008.

== Location ==
From its founding until 2004, the Durham Farmers' Market was held in the gravel parking lot of the Durham Athletic Park; in mid-2004, the market moved to the paved parking lot of Measurement Incorporated's headquarters. Beginning in 2007, the Farmers' Market found a permanent home under the Pavilion at Durham Central Park.
