= Durham Central Park =

Public park in Durham, North Carolina

Coordinates: 36°0′3.4″N 78°54′6.9″W

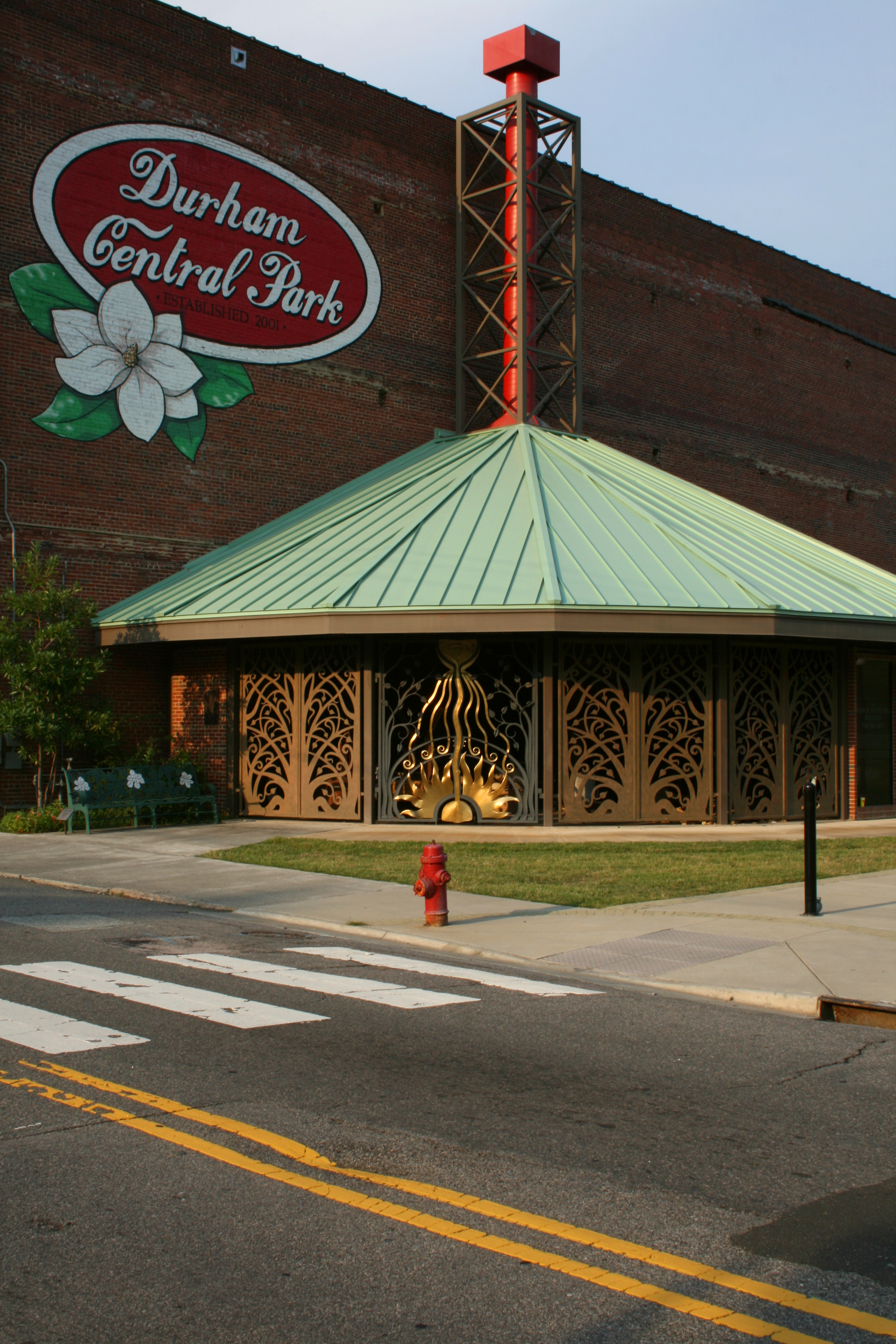
Durham Central Park in August, 2008.

Durham Central Park is an arts-themed, community-focused, municipal park in downtown Durham, North Carolina. It is located at 502 Foster Street, and is the site of the newly opened Pavilion at Durham Central Park which hosts the Durham Farmers' Market.

== Features of Durham Central Park ==
Interesting sites at Durham Central Park include:

- The Rhein Medall Community Art Award Winning Pieces, on temporary exhibition in the Park
- The Bridge over South Ellerbe Creek, crafted by local artisans—at the corner of Foster and Hunt
- The Grace Garden and the Butterfly Gardens and Nature Trail—on the East End of the Garden
- The Great Lawn

== The Pavilion at Durham Central Park ==
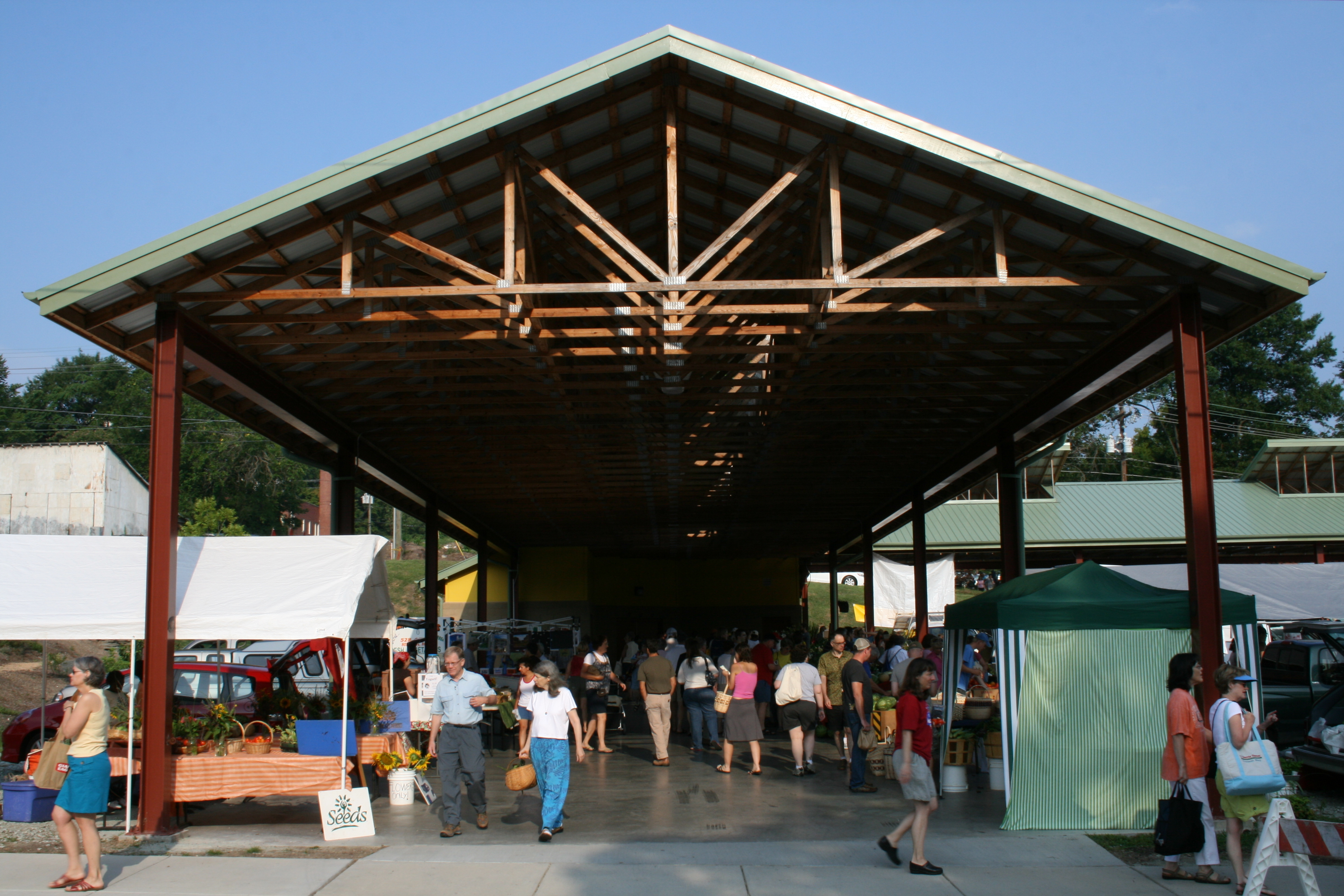
Durham Farmers' Market inside the Pavilion in July, 2008.

A recent addition to this downtown park is the Pavilion at Durham Central Park. The Pavilion opened with a grand celebration on April 7, 2007. The Pavilion at Durham Central Park hosts the Durham Farmers' Market every Saturday morning during the Spring, Summer, and Fall. The Pavilion at Durham Central Park is also available for private parties or outdoor events via Durham Central Park, Inc.
