= Doherty Park =

Baseball park in Durham, North Carolina

Doherty Park was a minor league baseball park in Durham, North Carolina. It was home to the Durham Bulls beginning in 1913 until El Toro Park was opened in 1926.

It was built by the Durham Traction Company, and was first known as Traction Park. It was renamed for company majority owner Henry L. Doherty in 1918. It was also often called the East Durham Park, as it was located just across the Durham city limit in what was then the separate community of East Durham.

The wooden ballpark was built in 1909. The venue was bounded by West Street (now part of Taylor Street) (south, home plate); North Driver Street (east, right field); and the Durham / East Durham border (north and west, center and left fields). Cherry Grove Street T'd into West (Taylor) at about where the west edge of the grandstand was. The ballpark continued to be listed as an athletic field in city maps as late as 1937.

A junior high school was built on the site in 1939. The school has since evolved into the Holton Career and Resource Center.
