= Tom Wright (baseball) =

American baseball player (1923–2017)

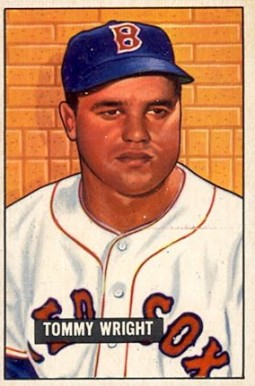
- Outfielder
- Born: September 22, 1923; Rutherfordton, North Carolina, U.S.
- Died: September 5, 2017 (aged 93); Shelby, North Carolina, U.S.
- Batted: Left Threw: Right

MLB debut
- September 15, 1948, for the Boston Red Sox

Last MLB appearance
- April 18, 1956, for the Washington Senators

MLB statistics
- Batting average: .255
- Home runs: 6
- Runs batted in: 99
- Stats at Baseball Reference

Teams
- Boston Red Sox (1948–1951); St. Louis Browns (1952); Chicago White Sox (1952–1953); Washington Senators (1954–1956)

Thomas Everette Wright (September 22, 1923 – September 5, 2017) was an American professional baseball player. The outfielder, born in Rutherfordton, North Carolina, played all or part of nine seasons in Major League Baseball (1948–56) for four American League teams. He threw right-handed, batted left-handed, stood 5 feet 11 inches (1.80 m) tall and weighed 180 pounds (82 kg) as an active player.

Wright was signed by the Boston Red Sox as an amateur free agent in 1942. After his first professional season, he entered the United States Army Air Forces, where he served in the Pacific Theater of Operations during World War II and missed the 1943–45 seasons. He returned to baseball in 1946, and led the Class C Carolina League in batting average (.380) and hits (an even 200), while making the CL All-Star team. His performance earned him a three-level promotion to the Double-A Southern Association for 1947, where he batted .325 and was also named an All-Star. Then, in 1948, he hit over .300 (at .307) for a third straight season, this time in the Triple-A American Association. On September 15, 1948, he made his Major League debut with the Red Sox—tripling as a pinch hitter in his first big-league at bat. Wright then returned to Triple-A for the entire 1949 campaign. He won the American Association batting championship (hitting .368) and collected 200 hits, second in the league. During the September 1949 pennant race, he made five pinch-hitting appearances for the Red Sox.

Wright spent all of 1950 on Boston's roster, hitting .318 in part-time and pinch-hitting duty, with 54 games played and 115 plate appearances. Of his 34 hits, only seven went for extra bases, all doubles. He then returned to Triple-A for much of 1951, getting into only 28 games with Boston, 13 as a starting outfielder, and batting only .222. After the season, he was traded to the St. Louis Browns on November 28, 1951. In 1952, Wright would set personal bests in games played (89) and hits (50), but he batted only .253 with two home runs and the Browns traded him after 29 games in St. Louis to the Chicago White Sox on June 15. He was a reserve outfielder for the ChiSox for the next year and a half, playing behind Minnie Miñoso, Sam Mele and Jim Rivera. During spring training on March 27, 1954, he was traded for the third and last time, to the Washington Senators. But Wright was still unable to break into the everyday lineup, appearing in 76 games, half of them as a starting outfielder.

He spent most of 1955 and 1956 in minor league baseball, except for eight appearances as a pinch hitter and one game for Washington as a pinch runner at the tail end of 1955 and the beginning of 1956. On April 18, 1956, he played his final game after nine seasons in the big leagues. Wright retired after the 1957 minor league season.

In 341 MLB games played, Wright registered 175 hits, including 28 doubles and 11 triples, as well as six home runs and 99 RBI. He batted .255 lifetime.

Wright died September 5, 2017, aged 93.
