= Len Matarazzo =

American baseball player (1928-2015)

- Pitcher
- Born: September 12, 1928; New Castle, Pennsylvania, U.S.
- Died: June 19, 2015 (aged 86); New Castle, Pennsylvania, U.S.
- Batted: Right Threw: Right

MLB debut
- September 6, 1952, for the Philadelphia Athletics

Last MLB appearance
- September 6, 1952, for the Philadelphia Athletics

MLB statistics
- Games pitched: 1
- Innings pitched: 1
- Runs allowed: 0
- Stats at Baseball Reference

Teams
- Philadelphia Athletics (1952)

Leonard Matarazzo (September 12, 1928 – June 19, 2015) was an American professional baseball player. On September 6, 1952, the right-handed pitcher appeared in the Major Leagues for the only time. Pitching for the Philadelphia Athletics, he worked one scoreless inning in relief against the Boston Red Sox. But he was not given another opportunity to pitch that year and spent the final two seasons of his six-year pro career in the minor leagues.

Matarazzo was a 6 ft 4 in (1.93 m), 195 lb (88 kg) native of New Castle, Pennsylvania. In his fourth pro season, as a member of the 1952 Fayetteville A's, he led the Class B Carolina League with a 22–8 win–loss record and was named the league's Most Valuable Player.

He was recalled by the parent Athletics in September. In his only MLB appearance, at Fenway Park, he pitched the bottom of the eighth inning against the Red Sox in a game the Athletics were trailing, 6–4. He allowed an infield single to Dom DiMaggio and a base on balls to Billy Goodman, but retired Mel Parnell, Al Zarilla and Vern Stephens to escape unscathed.

Matarrazo was sent back to Fayetteville for the 1953 season, and retired after the 1954 campaign.
