= Percy Miller Jr. =

American baseball player

- Born: June 6, 1931; Pittsylvania County, Virginia, U.S.
- Died: January 11, 2003 (aged 71)

William Percy Miller Jr. (June 6, 1931 – January 11, 2003) was an American minor league baseball player who broke the color barrier in the Carolina League. He was born and died in Danville, Virginia. The son of Negro league pitcher Percy Miller, he first played for the Danville Stars, a Negro team. He made his debut with the Danville Leafs, the first integrated pro team in Virginia, on August 9, 1951, and played nineteen games that season. He was "released" in February 1952 as not being polished enough, and returned to the Stars.
