= Russ Sullivan =

American baseball player (1923–2013)

- Outfielder
- Born: February 19, 1923; Fredericksburg, Virginia, U.S.
- Died: November 2, 2013 (aged 90); Fredericksburg, Virginia, U.S.
- Batted: Left Threw: Right

MLB debut
- September 8, 1951, for the Detroit Tigers

Last MLB appearance
- May 16, 1953, for the Detroit Tigers

MLB statistics
- Games played: 45
- Batting average: .267
- Home runs: 5
- Runs batted in: 12
- On-base percentage: .357
- Stats at Baseball Reference

Teams
- Detroit Tigers (1951–1953)

Russell Guy Sullivan (February 19, 1923 – November 2, 2013) was an American outfielder in Major League Baseball who played from 1951 to 1953 for the Detroit Tigers. Listed at 6 ft 0 in (183 cm), 196 lb (89 kg), he batted left handed and threw right handed.
