= Duke Brett =

American baseball player (1900–1974)

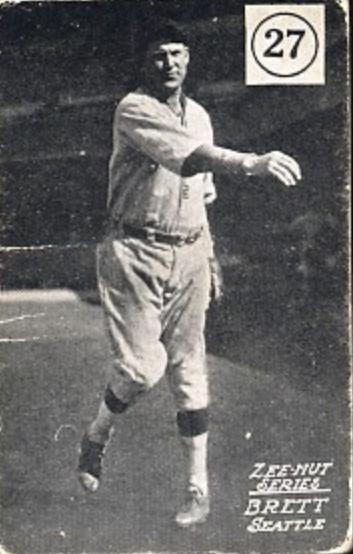
- Pitcher
- Born: May 23, 1900; Lawrenceville, Virginia, U.S.
- Died: November 25, 1974 (aged 74); St. Petersburg, Florida, U.S.
- Batted: Right Threw: Right

MLB debut
- August 8, 1924, for the Chicago Cubs

Last MLB appearance
- August 5, 1925, for the Chicago Cubs

MLB statistics
- Win–loss record: 1-1
- Earned run average: 3.97
- Strikeouts: 7
- Stats at Baseball Reference

Teams
- Chicago Cubs (1924–1925)

Herbert James "Duke" Brett (May 23, 1900 – November 25, 1974) was an American professional baseball player. He was a right-handed pitcher over parts of two seasons (1924–25) with the Chicago Cubs. For his career, he compiled a 1–1 record, with a 3.97 earned run average, and 7 strikeouts in 22.2 innings pitched.

Brett signed with the Cubs as an amateur free agent in 1924. He made his major league debut as the Cubs' starting pitcher on August 8, 1924, in a 10–7 win over the Boston Braves. Brett did not figure in the decision. It was his only appearance in his rookie year.

In 1925, Brett appeared in ten games for the Cubs, starting just one. His final appearance of the season was August 5, in a 7–6 win over the Philadelphia Phillies. On that day, Brett also picked up his one and only major league win. For the season, Brett posted a 3.63 ERA and a record of 1-1.

Brett went on to a long career as a minor league manager, serving as skipper for the Danville Leafs, Rocky Mount Red Sox, Little Rock Travelers, Wilmington Blue Rocks, Wellsville Yankees, Hagerstown Owls, Reidsville Luckies, Raleigh Capitals, Wichita Indians, and Winston-Salem Twins over a twenty-year career from 1934 to 1954.

He was born in Lawrenceville, Virginia and later died in St. Petersburg, Florida at the age of 74.
