= Guy Morton Jr. =

American baseball player (1930–2014)

- Pinch hitter
- Born: November 4, 1930; Tuscaloosa, Alabama, U.S.
- Died: May 11, 2014 (aged 83); Lorain, Ohio, U.S.
- Batted: Right Threw: Right

MLB debut
- September 17, 1954, for the Boston Red Sox

Last MLB appearance
- September 17, 1954, for the Boston Red Sox

MLB statistics
- Batting average: .000
- At bats: 1
- Hits: 0
- Stats at Baseball Reference

Teams
- Boston Red Sox (1954)

Guy Morton Jr. (November 4, 1930 – May 11, 2014) was an American Major League Baseball player. He struck out in his only major league at-bat with the Boston Red Sox in 1954.

Morton was the son of the former pitcher Guy Morton, Sr. The younger Morton attended the University of Alabama. In 1954, he was the Most Valuable Player of the Carolina League for his performance with the Greensboro Patriots.

Morton had a long career in the minor leagues, mostly as a catcher.

After retiring from baseball, Morton became a Baptist minister. After retiring from that career, he wrote a weekly sports column for a local newspaper in Vermilion, Ohio.

== See also ==
- List of second-generation Major League Baseball players
