= Ramón Monzant =

Venezuelan baseball player (1933-2001)

- Pitcher
- Born: January 4, 1933; Maracaibo, Venezuela
- Died: August 10, 2001 (aged 68); Maracaibo, Venezuela
- Batted: Right Threw: Right

MLB debut
- July 2, 1954, for the New York Giants

Last MLB appearance
- April 25, 1960, for the San Francisco Giants

MLB statistics
- Win–loss record: 16–21
- Earned run average: 4.38
- Strikeouts: 201
- Stats at Baseball Reference

Teams
- New York / San Francisco Giants (1954–1958; 1960)

Member of the Venezuelan

Baseball Hall of Fame
- Induction: 2006

Ramón Segundo Monzant Espina (January 4, 1933 – August 10, 2001) was a Venezuelan right-handed baseball pitcher in Major League Baseball (MLB) who played his entire career for the New York / San Francisco Giants from 1954 to 1960. He compiled a 16–21 record with a 4.38 earned run average (ERA) and 201 strikeouts in 316 2/3 innings.

== Career ==
Monzant was born in Maracaibo, Venezuela. He first played professionally for the Shelby Farmers in 1952 before being purchased by the New York Giants organization. In 1953, he played for the Danville Leafs and won 23 games for the team. Monzant was promoted to the Minneapolis Millers in 1954, and pitched in 27 games for the team, winning 11 and losing 7. He also played in six games for the Giants, making his major league debut on July 2, 1954. Monzant spent the first half of 1955 with the Millers before returning to the Giants. In 28 games, he had a 4–8 record and a 3.99 ERA. One of his best performances took place on April 29, 1956, in a Giants 8–1 complete game victory over the Philadelphia Phillies, when a one-out, first-inning single by Del Ennis cost him a no-hitter. Due to a sore arm, Monzant only pitched in four games that season, but returned in 1957 to pitch in 24 games for the Giants.

In 1958, Monzant remained on the major league roster for the full season. He pitched the first west coast night game on April 16, 1958, against the Los Angeles Dodgers, as both the Dodgers and now-San Francisco Giants has moved to the west coast beginning that season. He pitched in 43 games for the Giants that season. In 1959, citing a sore arm and a desire to sit out the season, wishing to return to Venezuela, Monzant retired from baseball. He returned to the Giants in 1960, pitching one game for them and spending the rest of the year with the Tacoma Giants, the team's AAA affiliate. During the season, he broke his leg while sliding into second base, which led to his retirement from baseball for good.

Monzant was named to the Venezuelan Baseball Hall of Fame in 2006, and was named to the Navegantes del Magallanes Hall of Fame in 2012.

== See also ==
- List of Major League Baseball players from Venezuela
