= Carolina League Most Valuable Player Award =

- Sport: Baseball
- League: Carolina League
- Awarded for: Regular-season most valuable player of the Carolina League
- Country: United States
- Presented by: Carolina League

History
- First award: Lewis Hester (1948)
- Most wins: Bubba Smith (2)
- Most recent: Cooper Flemming (2026)

The Carolina League Most Valuable Player Award (MVP) is an annual award given to the best player in Minor League Baseball's Carolina League based on their regular-season performance as voted on by league managers. League broadcasters, Minor League Baseball executives, and members of the media have previously voted as well. Though the league was established in 1945, the award was not created until 1948. After the cancellation of the 2020 season, the league was known as the Low-A East in 2021 before reverting to the Carolina League name in 2022.

Twenty-six outfielders have won the MVP Award, the most of any position. First basemen, with 21 winners, have won the most among infielders, followed by third basemen (9), shortstops (7), and second basemen (3). Eight catchers and four pitchers have also won the award.

Three players who have won the MVP Award also won the Carolina League Top MLB Prospect Award in the same season: Jackson Chourio (2022), Samuel Basallo (2023), and Jaison Chourio (2024). From 1948 to 1978, pitchers were eligible to win the MVP Award as no award was designated for pitchers. In 1959, the Carolina League established a Pitcher of the Year Award. The only player to win the MVP Award on multiple occasions is Bubba Smith, who won back-to-back in 1992 and 1993.

Fourteen players from the Lynchburg Hillcats have been selected for the MVP Award, more than any other team in the league, followed by the Winston-Salem Dash (10); the Salem RidgeYaks (8); the Peninsula Pilots (6); the Kinston Indians (5); the High Point-Thomasville Hi-Toms (4); the Carolina Mudcats, Charleston RiverDogs, Durham Bulls, Frederick Keys, Greensboro Yankees, Kinston Eagles, Myrtle Beach Pelicans, Potomac Nationals, Raleigh Pirates, Reidsville Luckies, and Wilson Tobs (2); and the Burlington Bees, Danville Leafs, Delmarva Shorebirds, Fayetteville A's, Kannapolis Cannon Ballers, Raleigh-Durham Triangles, Tidewater Tides, Wilmington Blue Rocks, and Winston-Salem Cardinals (1).

Eleven players from the Pittsburgh Pirates Major League Baseball (MLB) organization have won the award, more than any other, followed by the Cleveland Guardians organization (8); the Chicago White Sox organization (7); the Boston Red Sox and Philadelphia Phillies organizations (6); the New York Mets organization (5); the Baltimore Orioles organization (4); the Cincinnati Reds, Houston Astros, New York Yankees, and St. Louis Cardinals organizations (3); the Atlanta Braves, Chicago Cubs, Milwaukee Brewers, and Tampa Bay Rays, organizations (2); and the Colorado Rockies, Kansas City Royals, Minnesota Twins, Oakland Athletics, San Francisco Giants, Seattle Mariners, Texas Rangers, and Washington Nationals organizations (1). Three award winners played for teams that were not affiliated with any MLB organization.

== Winners ==
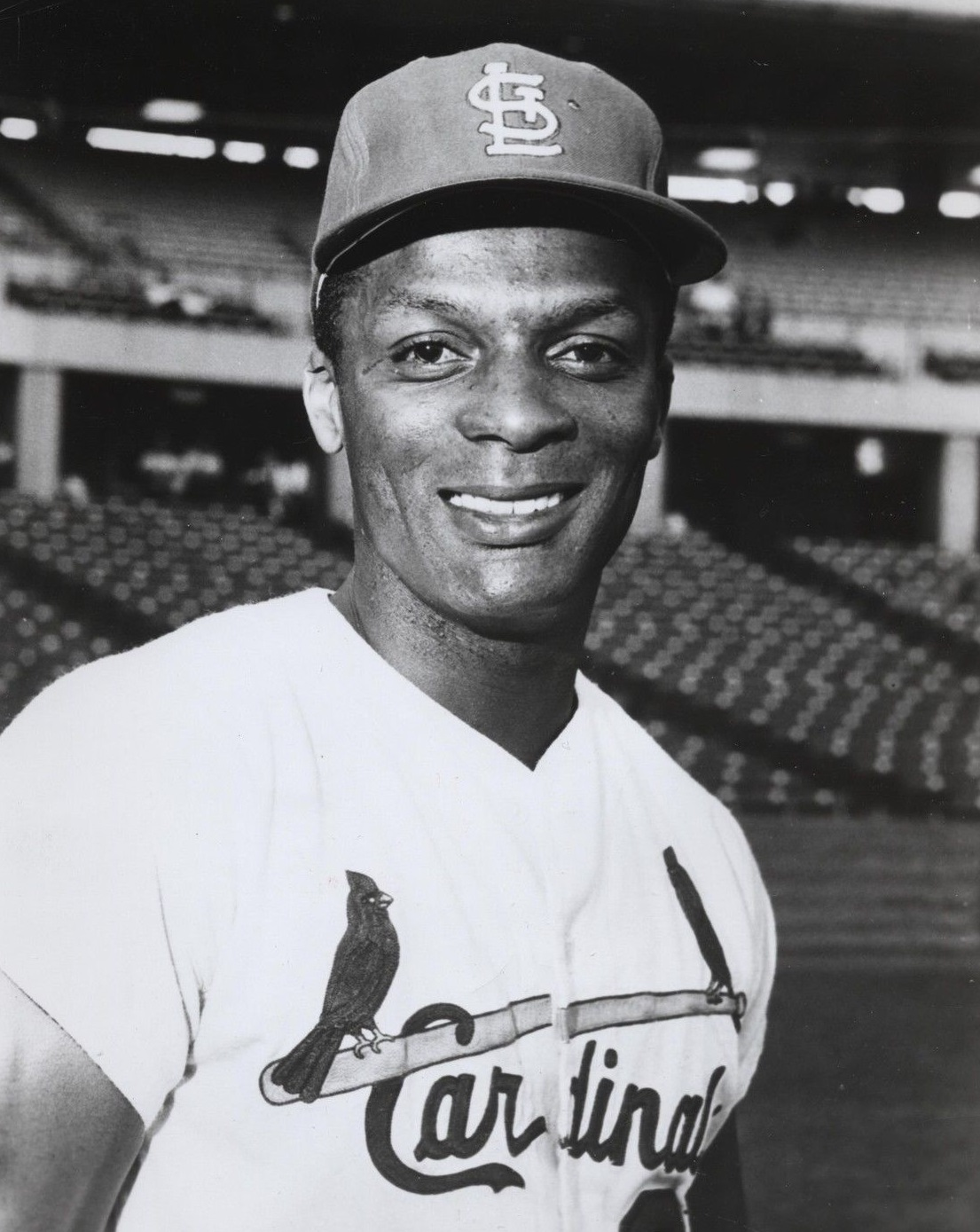
Curt Flood, the 1956 winner, was selected for the 1964, 1966, and 1968 MLB All-Star Games.

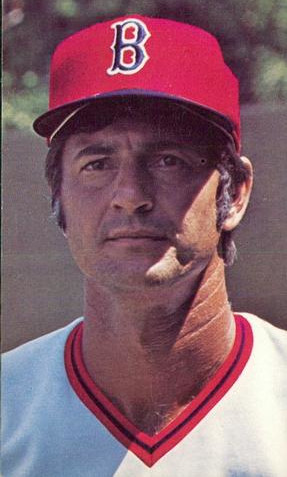
Carl Yastrzemski, the 1959 MVP, won the 1967 American League MVP Award and was inducted into the Baseball Hall of Fame in 1989.

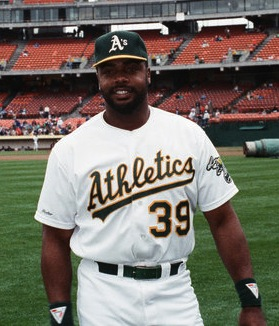
Dave Parker, the 1972 recipient, won the 1978 National League MVP Award.

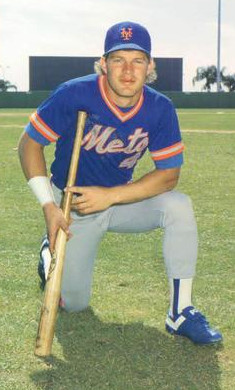
Lenny Dykstra, the 1983 MVP, was selected to play in three MLB All-Star Games (1990, 1994, and 1995).

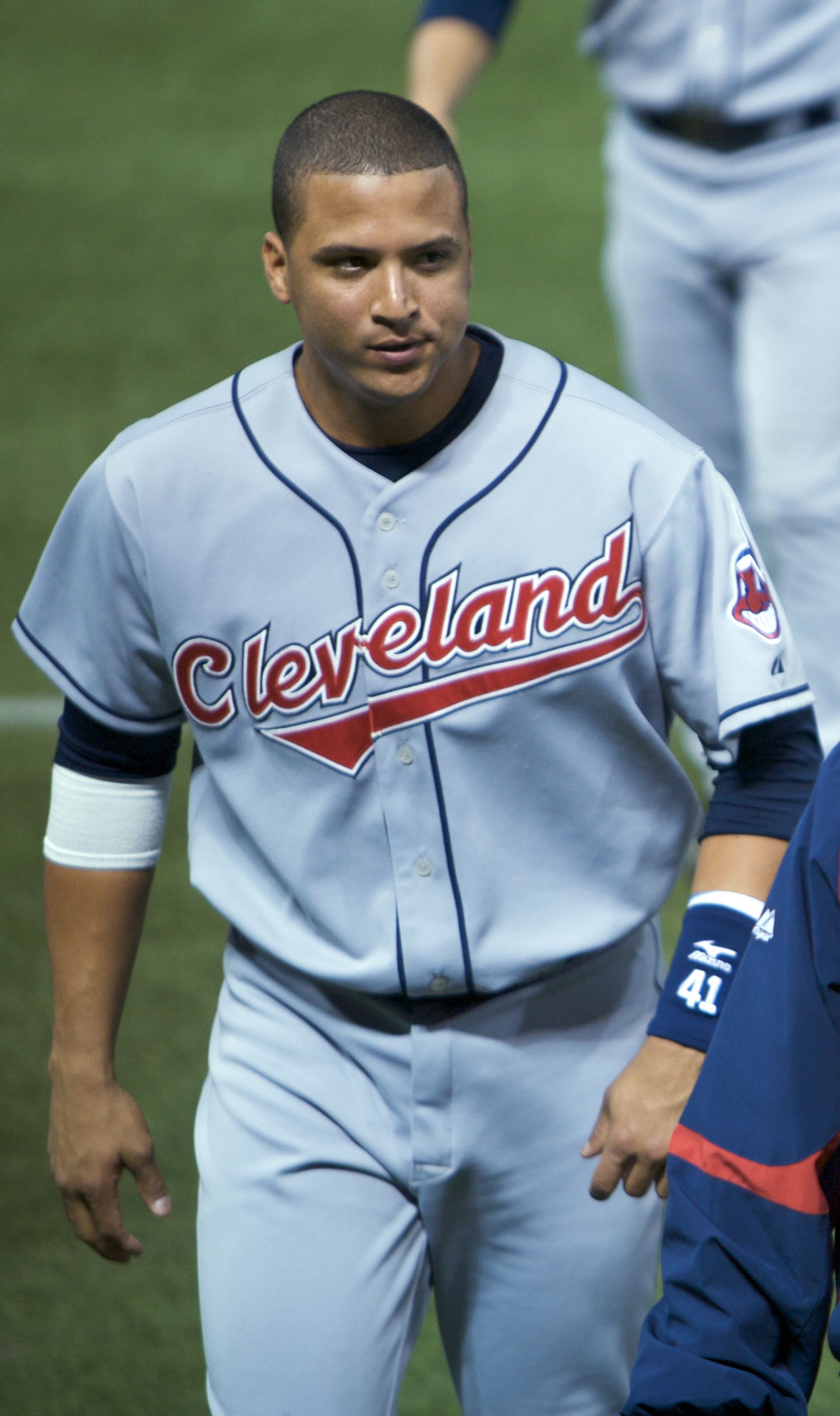
Víctor Martínez, the 2001 recipient, became a five-time MLB All-Star (2004, 2007, 2009, 2010, and 2014).

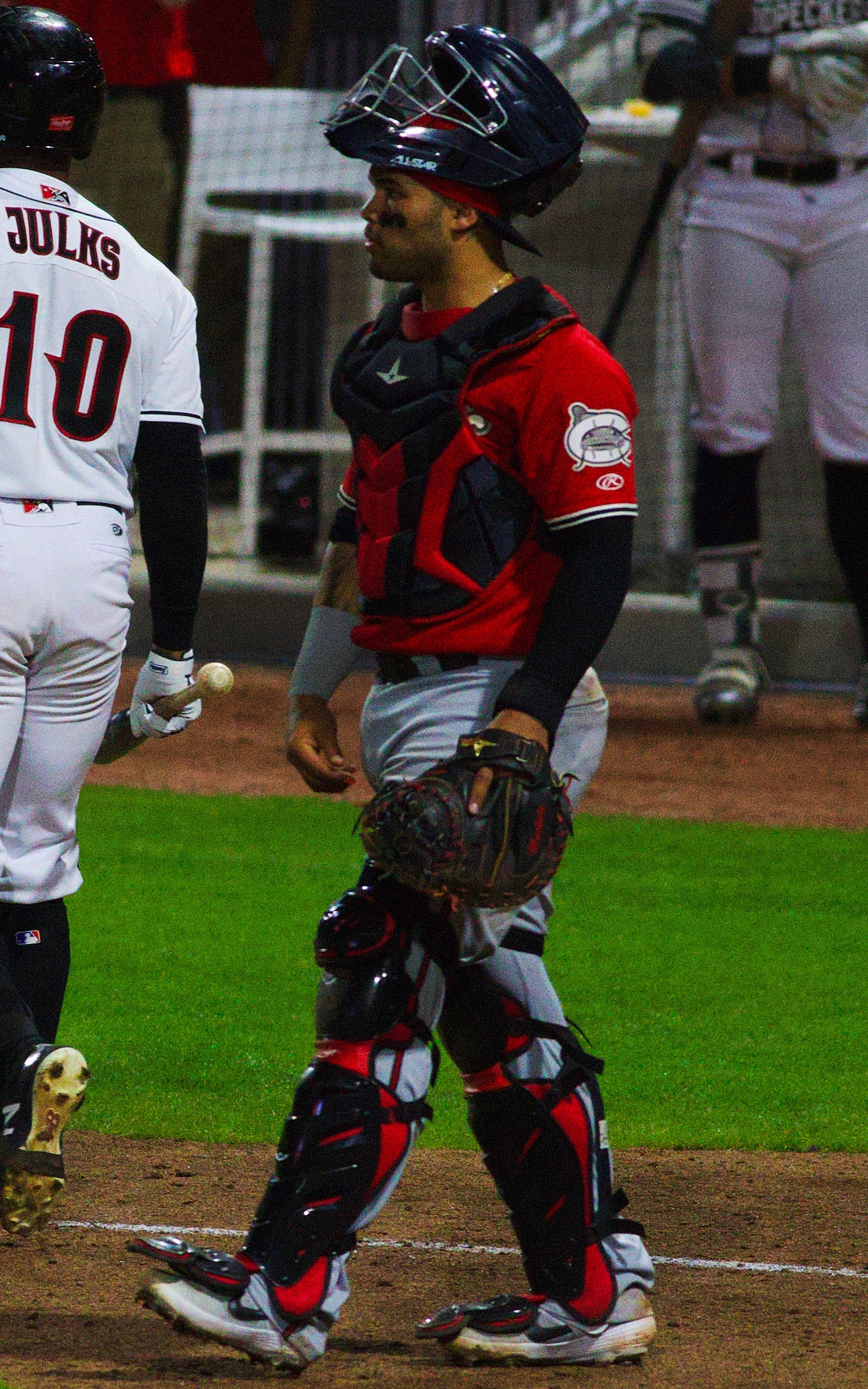
Mario Feliciano won the 2019 MVP Award.

Key
| Position | Indicates the player's primary position |
| (#) | Number of wins by players who won the award multiple times |

Winners
| Year | Winner | Team | Organization | Position | Ref(s). |
|---|---|---|---|---|---|
| 1948 | Lewis Hester | Reidsville Luckies | — | Pitcher | |
| 1949 | Leo Shoals | Reidsville Luckies | — | First baseman | |
| 1950 | William Evans | Burlington Bees | — | Outfielder | |
| 1951 | Ray Jablonski | Winston-Salem Cardinals | St. Louis Cardinals | Third baseman | |
| 1952 | Len Matarazzo | Fayetteville A's | Philadelphia Athletics | Pitcher | |
| 1953 | Ramón Monzant | Danville Leafs | New York Giants | Pitcher | |
| 1954 | Guy Morton Jr. | Greensboro Patriots | Boston Red Sox | Catcher | |
| 1955 | Danny Morejón | High Point-Thomasville Hi-Toms | Cincinnati Redlegs | Outfielder | |
| 1956 | Curt Flood | High Point-Thomasville Hi-Toms | Cincinnati Redlegs | Outfielder | |
| 1957 | Fred Van Dusen | High Point-Thomasville Hi-Toms | Philadelphia Phillies | Outfielder | |
| 1958 | Fred Valentine | Wilson Tobs | Baltimore Orioles | Outfielder | |
| 1959 | Carl Yastrzemski | Raleigh Capitals | Boston Red Sox | Second baseman | |
| 1960 | Ed Olivares | Winston-Salem Red Birds | St. Louis Cardinals | Third baseman | |
| 1961 | Chuck Weatherspoon | Wilson Tobs | Minnesota Twins | Outfielder | |
| 1962 | Rusty Staub | Durham Bulls | Houston Colt .45s | First baseman | |
| 1963 | Jim Price | Kinston Eagles | Pittsburgh Pirates | Catcher | |
| 1964 | Ed Stroud | Tidewater Tides | Chicago White Sox | Outfielder | |
| 1965 | Bobby Murcer | Greensboro Yankees | New York Yankees | Shortstop | |
| 1966 | Rob Snow | Winston-Salem Red Sox | Boston Red Sox | Pitcher | |
| 1967 | Don Money | Raleigh Pirates | Pittsburgh Pirates | Shortstop | |
| 1968 | Tony Solaita | High Point-Thomasville Hi-Toms | New York Yankees | First baseman | |
| 1969 | Lou Quinn | Salem Rebels | Pittsburgh Pirates | First baseman | |
| 1970 | Cliff Johnson | Raleigh-Durham Triangles | Houston Astros | Catcher | |
| 1971 | Richard Giallella | Peninsula Phillies | Philadelphia Phillies | Outfielder | |
| 1972 | Dave Parker | Salem Pirates | Pittsburgh Pirates | Outfielder | |
| 1973 | Terry Whitfield | Kinston Eagles | New York Yankees | Outfielder | |
| 1974 | Miguel Diloné | Salem Pirates | Pittsburgh Pirates | Outfielder | |
| 1975 | Luther Wrenn | Salem Pirates | Pittsburgh Pirates | Outfielder | |
| 1976 | Marshall Brant | Lynchburg Mets | New York Mets | First baseman | |
| 1977 | Oswaldo Olivares | Salem Pirates | Pittsburgh Pirates | Outfielder | |
| 1978 | Ozzie Virgil Jr. | Peninsula Pilots | Philadelphia Phillies | Catcher | |
| 1979 | Bob Dernier | Peninsula Pilots | Philadelphia Phillies | Outfielder | |
| 1980 | Julio Franco | Peninsula Pilots | Philadelphia Phillies | Shortstop | |
| 1981 | Brad Komminsk | Durham Bulls | Atlanta Braves | Outfielder | |
| 1982 | Juan Samuel | Peninsula Pilots | Philadelphia Phillies | Second baseman | |
| 1983 | Lenny Dykstra | Lynchburg Mets | New York Mets | Outfielder | |
| 1984 | Barry Lyons | Lynchburg Mets | New York Mets | Catcher | |
| 1985 | Shawn Abner | Lynchburg Mets | New York Mets | Outfielder | |
| 1986 | Gregg Jefferies | Lynchburg Mets | New York Mets | Shortstop | |
| 1987 | Casey Webster | Kinston Indians | Cleveland Indians | Third baseman | |
| 1988 | Mickey Pina | Lynchburg Red Sox | Boston Red Sox | Outfielder | |
| 1989 | Phil Plantier | Lynchburg Red Sox | Boston Red Sox | Outfielder | |
| 1990 | Gary Scott | Winston-Salem Spirits | Chicago Cubs | Third baseman | |
| 1991 | Pedro Castellano | Winston-Salem Spirits | Chicago Cubs | Third baseman | |
| 1992 | Bubba Smith (1) | Peninsula Pilots | Seattle Mariners | First baseman | |
| 1993 | Bubba Smith (2) | Winston-Salem Spirits | Cincinnati Reds | First baseman | |
| 1994 | Larry Sutton | Wilmington Blue Rocks | Kansas City Royals | First baseman | |
| 1995 | Richie Sexson | Kinston Indians | Cleveland Indians | First baseman | |
| 1996 | José Guillén | Lynchburg Hillcats | Pittsburgh Pirates | Outfielder | |
| 1997 | Aramis Ramírez | Lynchburg Hillcats | Pittsburgh Pirates | Third baseman | |
| 1998 | Joe Crede | Winston-Salem Warthogs | Chicago White Sox | Third baseman | |
| 1999 | Marcus Giles | Myrtle Beach Pelicans | Atlanta Braves | Second baseman | |
| 2000 | Troy Farnsworth | Potomac Cannons | St. Louis Cardinals | First baseman | |
| 2001 | Víctor Martínez | Kinston Indians | Cleveland Indians | Catcher | |
| 2002 | Brad Hawpe | Salem Avalanche | Colorado Rockies | First baseman | |
| 2003 | Chris Shelton | Lynchburg Hillcats | Pittsburgh Pirates | First baseman | |
| 2004 | Brad Eldred | Lynchburg Hillcats | Pittsburgh Pirates | First baseman | |
| 2005 | Leo Daigle | Winston-Salem Warthogs | Chicago White Sox | First baseman | |
| 2006 | Jordan Brown | Kinston Indians | Cleveland Indians | Outfielder | |
| 2007 | Mitch Einertson | Salem Avalanche | Houston Astros | Outfielder | |
| 2008 | Beau Mills | Kinston Indians | Cleveland Indians | First baseman | |
| 2009 | Brandon Waring | Frederick Keys | Baltimore Orioles | First baseman | |
| 2010 | Tyler Moore | Potomac Nationals | Washington Nationals | First baseman | |
| 2011 | Ian Gac | Winston-Salem Dash | Chicago White Sox | First baseman | |
| 2012 | Dan Black | Winston-Salem Dash | Chicago White Sox | First baseman | |
| 2013 | Chris Curley | Winston-Salem Dash | Chicago White Sox | Shortstop | |
| 2014 | Joey Gallo | Myrtle Beach Pelicans | Texas Rangers | Third baseman | |
| 2015 | Nellie Rodríguez | Lynchburg Hillcats | Cleveland Indians | First baseman | |
| 2016 | Bobby Bradley | Lynchburg Hillcats | Cleveland Indians | First baseman | |
| 2017 | Ademar Rifaela | Frederick Keys | Baltimore Orioles | Outfielder | |
| 2018 | Bobby Dalbec | Salem Red Sox | Boston Red Sox | Third baseman | |
| 2019 | Mario Feliciano | Carolina Mudcats | Milwaukee Brewers | Catcher | |
| 2020 | None selected (season cancelled due to COVID-19 pandemic) | | | | |
| 2021 | Diego Infante | Charleston RiverDogs | Tampa Bay Rays | Outfielder | |
| 2022 | Jackson Chourio | Carolina Mudcats | Milwaukee Brewers | Outfielder | |
| 2023 | Samuel Basallo | Delmarva Shorebirds | Baltimore Orioles | Catcher | |
| 2024 | Jaison Chourio | Lynchburg Hillcats | Cleveland Guardians | Outfielder | |
| 2025 | Caleb Bonemer | Kannapolis Cannon Ballers | Chicago White Sox | Shortstop | |
| 2026 | Cooper Flemming | Charleston RiverDogs | Tampa Bay Rays | Shortstop | |

== Wins by team ==
Active Carolina League teams appear in bold.

| Team | Award(s) | Year(s) |
|---|---|---|
| **Lynchburg Hillcats** (Lynchburg Mets/Red Sox) | 14 | 1976, 1983, 1984, 1985, 1986, 1988, 1989, 1996, 1997, 2003, 2004, 2015, 2016, 2024 |
| Winston-Salem Dash (Winston-Salem Red Brids/Red Sox/Spirits/Warthogs) | 10 | 1960, 1966, 1990, 1991, 1993, 1998, 2005, 2011, 2012, 2013 |
| **Salem RidgeYaks** (Salem Rebels/Pirates/Avalanche/Red Sox) | 8 | 1969, 1972, 1974, 1975, 1977, 2002, 2007, 2018 |
| Peninsula Pilots (Peninsula Phillies) | 6 | 1971, 1978, 1979, 1980, 1982, 1992 |
| Kinston Indians | 5 | 1987, 1995, 2001, 2006, 2008 |
| High Point-Thomasville Hi-Toms | 4 | 1955, 1956, 1957, 1968 |
| Carolina Mudcats | 2 | 2019, 2022 |
| **Charleston RiverDogs** | 2 | 2021, 2026 |
| Durham Bulls | 2 | 1962, 1981 |
| Frederick Keys | 2 | 2009, 2017 |
| Greensboro Yankees (Greensboro Patriots) | 2 | 1954, 1965 |
| Kinston Eagles | 2 | 1963, 1973 |
| **Myrtle Beach Pelicans** | 2 | 1999, 2014 |
| Potomac Nationals (Potomac Cannons) | 2 | 2000, 2010 |
| Raleigh Pirates (Raleigh Capitals) | 2 | 1959, 1967 |
| Reidsville Luckies | 2 | 1948, 1949 |
| Wilson Tobs | 2 | 1958, 1961 |
| Burlington Bees | 1 | 1950 |
| Danville Leafs | 1 | 1953 |
| **Delmarva Shorebirds** | 1 | 2023 |
| Fayetteville A's | 1 | 1952 |
| **Kannapolis Cannon Ballers** | 1 | 2025 |
| Raleigh-Durham Triangles | 1 | 1970 |
| Tidewater Tides | 1 | 1964 |
| Wilmington Blue Rocks | 1 | 1994 |
| Winston-Salem Cardinals | 1 | 1951 |

== Wins by organization ==
Active Carolina League–Major League Baseball affiliations appear in bold.

| Organization | Award(s) | Year(s) |
|---|---|---|
| Pittsburgh Pirates | 11 | 1963, 1967, 1969, 1972, 1974, 1975, 1977, 1996, 1997, 2003, 2004 |
| **Cleveland Guardians** (Cleveland Indians) | 8 | 1987, 1995, 2001, 2006, 2008, 2015, 2016, 2024 |
| **Chicago White Sox** | 7 | 1964, 1998, 2005, 2011, 2012, 2013, 2025 |
| **Boston Red Sox** | 6 | 1954, 1959, 1966, 1988, 1989, 2018 |
| Philadelphia Phillies | 6 | 1957, 1971, 1978, 1979, 1980, 1982 |
| New York Mets | 5 | 1976, 1983, 1984, 1985, 1986 |
| **Baltimore Orioles** | 4 | 1958, 2009, 2017, 2023 |
| Cincinnati Reds (Cincinnati Redlegs) | 3 | 1955, 1956, 1993 |
| **Houston Astros** (Houston Colt .45s) | 3 | 1962, 1970, 2007 |
| New York Yankees | 3 | 1965, 1968, 1973 |
| St. Louis Cardinals | 3 | 1951, 1960, 2000 |
| **Atlanta Braves** | 2 | 1981, 1999 |
| **Chicago Cubs** | 2 | 1990, 1991 |
| **Milwaukee Brewers** | 2 | 2019, 2022 |
| **Tampa Bay Rays** | 2 | 2021, 2026 |
| Colorado Rockies | 1 | 2002 |
| **Kansas City Royals** | 1 | 1994 |
| Minnesota Twins | 1 | 1961 |
| Oakland Athletics (Philadelphia Athletics) | 1 | 1952 |
| San Francisco Giants (New York Giants) | 1 | 1953 |
| Seattle Mariners | 1 | 1992 |
| **Texas Rangers** | 1 | 2014 |
| **Washington Nationals** | 1 | 2010 |
