= Graham High School (North Carolina) =

American public school in North Carolina

Location
- 903 Trollinger Rd; Graham, North Carolina 27253; United States; 36°04′33″N 79°22′55″W

Information
- Type: Public
- School district: Alamance-Burlington School System
- CEEB code: 341560
- Principal: Joshua Brown
- Teaching staff: 48.83 (FTE)
- Grades: 9–12
- Enrollment: 744 (2023-2024)
- Student to teacher ratio: 15.24
- Colors: Red and Black
- Athletics: NCHSAA 4A
- Athletics conference: Mid-Carolina 4A/5A/6A
- Team name: Red Devils
- Website: www.abss.k12.nc.us/o/ghs

Graham High School is a public high school located in Graham, North Carolina.

== About ==
Graham High School is a comprehensive, four-year high school serving the city of Graham. It is one of six traditional high schools in the Alamance-Burlington School System. Graham High School is accredited by The Southern Association of Colleges and Secondary Schools and the North Carolina Department of Public Instruction. Student enrollment in grades 9–12 is approximately 830. The mascot is the Red Devils. Joshua Brown is the principal and has served as principal since 2022. Kyle Ward is the athletic director. Graham High School is located at 903 Trollinger Road. It opened its doors in the fall of 1968. The building was formerly known as Central High School from 1961 to 1968.

== Notable alumni ==
- Jane Albright, former women's college basketball coach
- Jim Holt, former MLB player
- John Isley, radio host with comedic program The John Boy & Billy Big Show
- Jamie Newman, NFL player
