= Durham Athletic Park =

Baseball stadium in North Carolina, US

- The DAP
- Durham Athletic Park, circa 1990.
- Interactive map of Durham Athletic Park
- Former names: El Toro Park (1926–1933)
- Location: 428 Morris St; Durham, NC 27701
- Coordinates: 36°0′10.04″N 78°54′10.06″W
- Owner: City of Durham
- Capacity: 5,000
- Surface: Grass
- Record attendance: 6,202
- Field size: Left Field – 330 ft (100 m); Left Center Field – 365 ft (111 m); Center Field – 405 ft (123 m); Right Center Field – 340 ft (100 m); Right Field – 290 ft (88 m)

Construction
- Opened: July 7, 1926 (wooden grandstand); July 2, 1939 (temporary structure); April 7, 1940 (current structure)
- Renovated: 1939–40 (rebuilt); 1979–80; 2008–09
- Expanded: 1988
- Cost: $160,000 (1926 stadium)
- Architect: George Watts Carr

Tenants
- Durham Bulls (PL/CL) (1920–1933, 1936–1943, 1945–1967, 1980–1994); Durham Black Sox (1920s–1930s) (Negro leagues); Durham Eagles/Rams (1940s–1960s); Raleigh-Durham Mets/Phillies/Triangles (CL) (1968–1971); Durham Braves/Americans (CPL) (1997–2002); Durham Dragons (softball); North Carolina Central Eagles (NCAA) (2010-2021); ACC Tournament (1984, 1986)

Durham Athletic Park, nicknamed "The DAP", is a former minor league baseball stadium in Durham, North Carolina. The stadium was home to the Durham Bulls from 1926 through 1994, the North Carolina Central Eagles and the Durham School of the Arts Bulldogs. The DAP sits north of the downtown area of Durham, on the block bounded by Washington, Corporation, Foster and Geer streets.

Durham Athletic Park became one of the most famous minor league ballparks in history thanks to the 1988 film Bull Durham, featuring the Bulls, Kevin Costner, Tim Robbins and Susan Sarandon. Most of the filming was done at the DAP following the end of the Carolina League's 1987 season. The film's wide acclaim helped fuel the burgeoning public interest in minor league baseball in general. In the case of both the city and the film, this explosion of popularity caused the DAP to become a victim of its own success; despite expansion with temporary bleachers, it became too small to handle the increase in crowd size and the Bulls’ Triple-A ambitions.

The Bulls moved to their new home, the Durham Bulls Athletic Park (also known as "DBAP") in downtown Durham, starting with the 1995 season. The DBAP was originally built with a capacity befitting Carolina League standards, but more land was acquired so that the park could to be expanded for Triple-A baseball. Triple-A baseball came to Durham in 1998, with the Bulls moving up and the DBAP being expanded.

== El Toro Park ==
=== Before El Toro ===
In their early days, the Durham Bulls played at Trinity College's Hanes Field,—named for the founder of the clothing company, a Trinity graduate—now called Williams Field and still used for field hockey on Duke's east campus.

From 1913 until early summer 1926, the Bulls played their games at Doherty Park in what was then called East Durham.

=== A place to call their own ===
On July 7, 1926, the Bulls moved to a new field called El Toro Park, built atop the streambed of Ellerbe Creek, which was re-routed, underground, through a tunnel beneath the pitcher's mound. The ballpark, originally built with a wooden grandstand, was dedicated by the Commissioner of Baseball, Kenesaw Mountain Landis, on July 26, 1926, who rode the team's mascot, a live bull, onto the playing field. In 1932, the Bulls were affiliated with the Philadelphia Phillies, and the Yankees in 1933. The facility was renamed Durham Athletic Park during the 1933 offseason, following a $20,000 donation by Annie Watts Hill and her husband, John Sprunt Hill, that enabled the City of Durham to purchase the park.

=== The Depression and disaster ===
The Bulls sat out the 1934 and 1935 seasons, owing to the Great Depression. For 1936, Cincinnati Reds moved their affiliation in the Piedmont League, the Wilmington Pirates, to Durham, re-activating the Bulls franchise. Shortly after midnight on June 17, 1939, following a 7–3 win over the Portsmouth Cubs, the wooden Durham Athletic Park was destroyed by a fire that caused more than $100,000 in damage and nearly killed groundskeeper Walter Williams, who was asleep under the grandstand when the blaze began.

== The current stadium ==
Less than two weeks after the disastrous fire, a new concrete and steel grandstand, seating 1,000 spectators, opened on July 2, 1939, in time for the Bulls to face the Charlotte Hornets, as a result, 1939 is the year from which the current DAP is normally dated.

During the 1939–1940 offseason, the stadium was rebuilt on-site, with 2,000 grandstand seats and portable bleachers along the 1st and 3rd base lines. Funding for the completely new stadium was provided by John Sprunt Hill, and the design was penned by Durham architect George Watts Carr, who added the park's distinctive conical ticket tower. The new DAP reopened April 7, 1940, for an exhibition game between the Cincinnati Reds and the Boston Red Sox. The Bulls, now affiliated with the Dodgers, played their first game in the new DAP on April 17, before a crowd of 1,587.

=== Postwar decline ===
After sitting out the 1944 season, a year-long drought of baseball at the DAP due to the second World War, the Bulls were re-activated in early 1945 as the Red Sox's Class-C team in the newly established Carolina League. Following a realignment to become part of the Detroit Tigers club in 1948, the DAP witnessed an important moment in the civil rights movement, when on August 10, 1951, Percy Miller, Jr., the first black player in the Carolina League, made his minor league debut with the visiting Danville Leafs.

Attention to baseball waned in the Bull City through the 1960s, even after the Bulls affiliated with the Houston Colt .45s expansion team. Attendance numbers were down throughout the region, so much so that after the 1967 season, the Bulls acquired the Raleigh Pirates from the nearby city of Raleigh, North Carolina, which was merged with the Bulls. The team, now called the Raleigh-Durham Mets, split seasons between the DAP and Raleigh's Devereaux Meadow. The team became the Raleigh-Durham Phillies in 1969, the Triangles for 1970, and disbanded again after the 1971 season, leaving the stalwart Durham Athletic Park virtually without a purpose.

=== Reborn again ===
The Bulls continued to come and go over the years in various iterations, as was common for many minor league teams at the time. In 1980, the Bulls were revived and affiliated with the Atlanta Braves by new owner Miles Wolff, returning to the DAP for the first time in nine years on April 15, 1980 before a crowd of 4,418. The park was repainted in the bright blue and orange team colors. Over the interior entrance was a sign reading El Toro Stadium, a variation of its original name. The team had a successful year, leading the Carolina League in attendance that first season with 175,963 and nearly 30% of the league total of 600,809. This was also well ahead of second-place Salem which drew 102,456.

=== Bull Durham and beyond ===
The team's popularity was boosted when the ballpark became the primary setting for the film Bull Durham, which also unfortunately contributed to the end of the DAP; increased attendance with frequent capacity crowds and an interest in attracting a Triple-A franchise prompted the city to build a new ballpark on the other side of downtown, adjacent to the former American Tobacco campus. 1993 was promoted as the final season for the DAP, but construction delays compelled the team to play the 1994 season there; in 1994, the club sold T-shirts bearing the legend "2nd Annual Final Season at the DAP". On September 5, 1994, the Bulls played their final game at the DAP, a 6–2 loss to the Winston-Salem Spirits in Game 1 of the Carolina League's South Division playoffs.

In 1995, the Bulls moved to the new Durham Bulls Athletic Park or "D-BAP". Attendance continued to be so good that the Bulls were promoted to Triple-A 3 years later, when Major League Baseball's most recent round of expansion required the addition of two new Triple-A teams. Despite the relatively small size of their home city, the Bulls continue to compete in attendance figures with the larger member cities of the International League.

== The DAP after the Durham Bulls ==
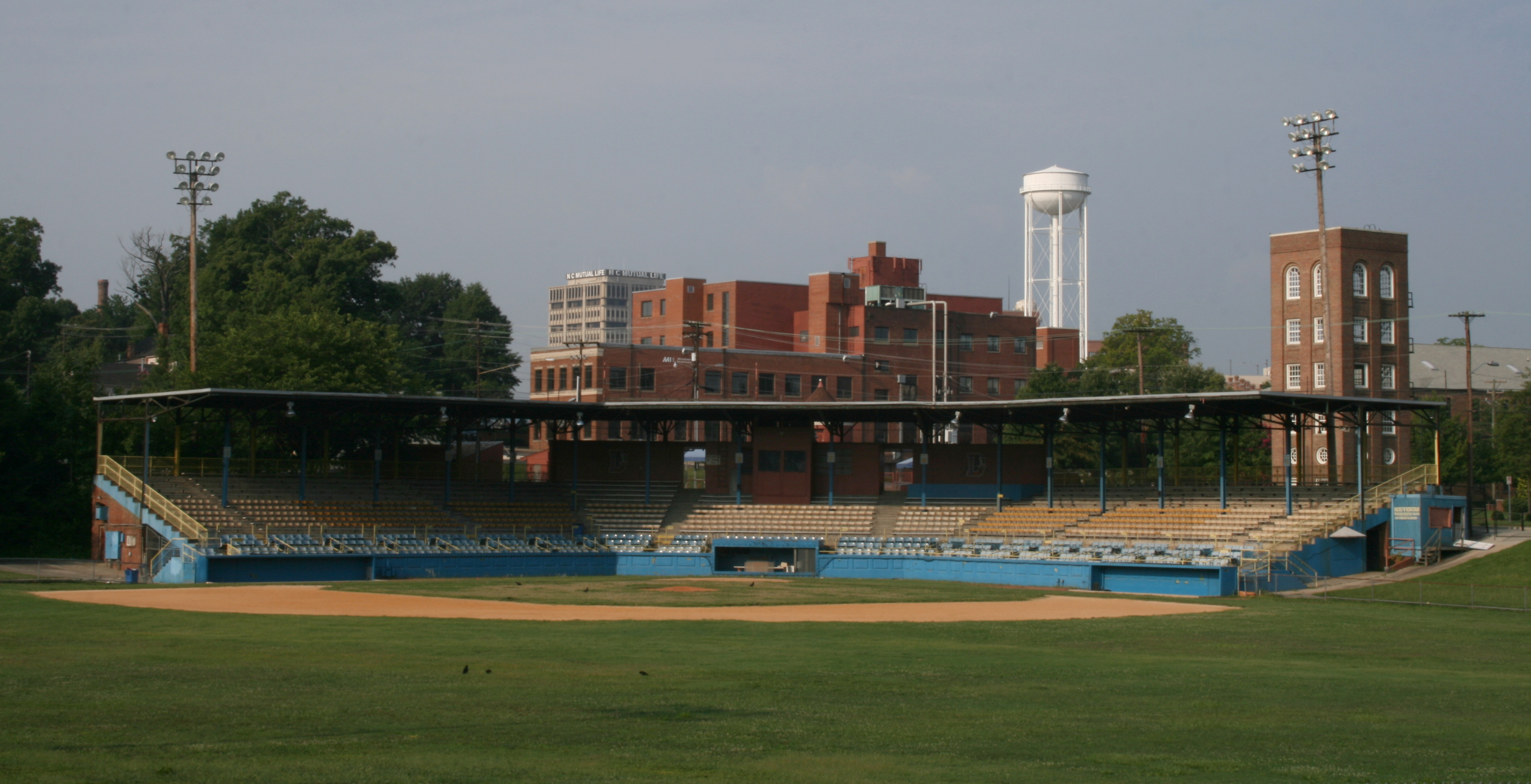
Durham Athletic Park in July 2008.

Following the Bulls' departure in September 1994, the DAP was still used for events such as concerts, the Bull Durham Blues Festival, the World Beer Festival and softball tournaments, and was the regular home field of the (now defunct) Durham Americans (formerly Durham Braves) of the Coastal Plain League, an NCAA-sanctioned collegiate summer league.

The Durham Dragons of the Women's Professional Softball League (forerunner to the current National Pro Fastpitch League) also made the park their home.

From 1998 to 2004, the Durham Athletic Park's main parking lot was home to the Durham Farmers' Market on Saturday mornings during the Winter.

In the summer of 2005, rumors of baseball returning to the DAP surfaced again, as nearby North Carolina Central University announced plans to begin sponsoring baseball, identifying the DAP as the team's home venue. NCCU had its last season at the stadium in 2021, as baseball was cut from the school's athletic program. The Eagles won the MEAC regular season championship that year, also winning their last game at the DAP on May 15, 6–1 versus Florida A&M.

=== 2008–2009 renovation ===
In 2008, the City of Durham allocated over $4 million in general obligation bond funds to renovate the DAP; Baltimore developer Struever Bros. Eccles and Rouse was tasked with renovating the historic facility, in the hopes that it will be operated by Minor League Baseball as a training facility for umpires, groundskeepers, and other crew. The DAP will be used for NCCU games and other athletic programming along with concerts, festivals and other events. MiLB is also considering building a Minor League Baseball "fan experience museum" with public-sector support; the buildings at the northeast corner of the ballpark are of the greatest interest for this significant tourist attraction. In early 2008, the City of Durham pledged an additional $1 million to the renovation, the money coming from interest earned on unspent bond funds. A ground-breaking ceremony was held on April 30, with reconstruction beginning in late July 2008.

The stadium re-opened on August 15, 2009, concluding the renovation with a picnic featuring former Bulls players and local celebrities.

=== The Bulls return to the DAP ===
On the evening of May 10, 2010, before a crowd of 3,911, the now Triple-A Bulls returned to The DAP for a single regular-season game against the Toledo Mud Hens. With additional lighting on-hand to raise the field to Triple-A standards, the Bulls fell to the Mud Hens 6–4, mirroring the score of the Single-A club's final game in the stadium 16 years prior.

Among other events scheduled for 2011 was another return to the DAP by the Bulls, again on the second Monday night in May. The game was played on May 9 and resulted in a loss to the Indianapolis Indians.

=== MiLB Departs the DAP ===
On September 2, 2011, Minor League Baseball announced that it would not renew its contract to manage the DAP, with the Bulls announcing on December 27, 2011, that they would be assuming the operating agreement.

=== Future ===
In April 2024, the City of Durham issued a Request for Proposals to select a firm to conduct a feasibility study on the future of the Durham Athletic Park. On October 7, 2024, the Durham City Council voted to select architecture firm Perkins & Will. Concepts produced by Perkins & Will will focus on reinvigorating DAP as a public destination and may include expanding or substantially altering the existing facility. The City is reportedly not interested in selling the land or using it for a private purpose. In January and February 2025, the City conducted an online survey and in-person meetings to solicit community input. The study is expected to run through Summer 2025.

== Dimensions ==
During its final years as a regular minor league ballpark:

- Left Field – 330 feet (100 m)
- Left Center Field – 365 feet (111 m)
- Center Field – 405 feet (123 m)
- Center Field Corner, outer wall – 500 feet (150 m)
- Deep Right Center Field – 370 feet (110 m)
- Right Center Field – not posted
- Right Field – 305 feet (93 m)

The refurbished ballpark for 2010 is even cozier, at 290 feet (88 m) to right field and 340 feet (100 m) (unmarked) to right-center field. Straightaway center is 398 feet (121 m), left center is unmarked, and the left field line is slightly deeper at 335 feet (102 m).
