= Reidsville Luckies =

- 1935–1955; (1935–1940, 1947–1955, 2021-2024); Reidsville, North Carolina

Minor league affiliations
- Previous classes: Class B (1949–1955); Class C (1948); Class B (1947); Class D (1935–1940)
- League: Old North State League (2021–2024)
- Previous leagues: Carolina League (1948-1955); Tri-State League (1947); Bi-State League (1935–1940)

Major league affiliations
- Previous teams: Brooklyn Dodgers (1937, 1939)

Minor league titles
- League titles: 1 (1952)

Team data
- Previous names: Reidsville Phillies (1955)

The Reidsville Luckies were a minor league baseball team based in Reidsville, North Carolina, USA. They played in the Bi-State League from 1935–1940 and returned in 1947 as part of the Tri-State League in 1947. They switched to the Carolina League in 1948 and remained there till the team was dissolved after the 1955 season.

The team returned as a college wood bat summer team in 2021 as a member of the Old North State League. They made the post-season in 2024, losing to the eventual champion. A Rockingham County native acquired partial ownership in May 2024.

== Notable alumni ==
- Watty Clark (1939)
- Dick Culler (1938-1939)
- Dallas Green (1955) Manager: 1980 World Series Champion Philadelphia Phillies

== Year Record ==
Year	Record	Finish	Manager	Playoffs
1935	39-75	8th	Glenn Biggerstaff / L.J. Perry	
1936	54-61	5th	Jimmy Maus	
1937	51-65	6th	Charlie A. Moore	
1938	71-48	3rd	Jim Poole	Lost in 1st round
1939	48-65	6th	Win Clark (28-26) / Dick Culler / Watty Clark	
1940	43-75	8th	Jim Callahan / Jim Gruzdis	
1947	45-92	8th	Lee Gamble	
1948	57-85	7th	Barney DeForge / Tal Abernathy / Bill Nagel	
1949	63-80	7th	John George / George Souter / Harry Hatch / Cecil "Zip" Payne	
1950	82-72	4th	Herb Brett	Lost in 1st round
1951	76-64	4th	Herb Brett	Lost League Finals
1952	74-64	4th	Ralph Hodgin	League Champs
1953	73-66	4th	Ralph Hodgin	Lost League Finals
1954	56-83	7th	Fred Harrington	

== Notable alumni ==
- Watty Clark (1939)
- Dallas Green (1955) Manager: 1980 World Series Champion - Philadelphia Phillies
