= Devereaux Meadow =

Minor league baseball stadium

Coordinates: 35°47′25″N 78°38′37″W

Devereaux (or Devereux) Meadow was a minor league baseball stadium located in Raleigh, North Carolina. It was located on the north side of Peace Street (south, right field) between Dawson Street (east, left field), which was later merged into Capital Boulevard; and West Street (west, first base). The site had long been a playground. In 1938 the city decided to build a ballpark on the site. It eventually became the home of the Raleigh Capitals from (1945–1953) and from (1957–62); the Raleigh Mets for the 1963 season; the Raleigh Cardinals from (1964–1965); the Raleigh Pirates from (1966–1967); the Raleigh-Durham Mets for the 1968 season; the Raleigh-Durham Phillies for the 1969 season; and the Raleigh-Durham Triangles from (1970–1971). The ballpark was demolished in 1979 to make way for a parking lot for waste disposal vehicles.

The City of Raleigh has proposed the restoration of the area as a linear park under the Capital Boulevard Corridor Study, which was adopted by the Raleigh City Council in 2012. The plan does not involve the restoration of the original baseball field but would instead include a linear park and a restoration of the adjacent Pigeon House Branch Creek.
