= World War Memorial Stadium =

Baseball park in North Carolina, US

- War Memorial Stadium
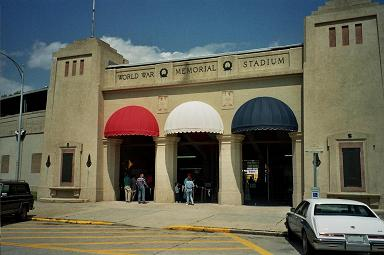
- Interactive map of World War Memorial Stadium
- Location: 510 Yanceyville St., Greensboro, North Carolina
- Coordinates: 36°4′47″N 79°46′38″W
- Owner: North Carolina A&T State University
- Capacity: 7,500
- Field size: Left field: 327 ft (100 m); Center field: 401 ft (122 m); Right field: 327 ft (100 m)

Construction
- Opened: 11 November 1926; 100 years ago
- Architects: Leonard White Jr.; Harry Barton

Tenants
- Greensboro Patriots (PL) 1928–1934; Greensboro Red Sox (PL) 1941–1942; Greensboro Patriots (CL) 1945–51, 1955–57, 1968; Greensboro Red Wings (Independent Negro) 1948; Greensboro Pirates (CL) 1952–54; Greensboro Yankees (CL) 1958–67; Greensboro Hornets (SAL) 1979–1993; Greensboro Bats (SAL) 1994–2004; North Carolina A&T Aggies football (NCAA) 1927-1980; North Carolina A&T Aggies baseball (NCAA) 1927-present James B. Dudley High School 1927-1977
- World War Memorial Stadium
- U.S. National Register of Historic Places
- Location within North Carolina Location within the United States
- Built: 1926
- Architectural style: modern classicism
- NRHP reference No.: 01000377
- Added to NRHP: April 12, 2001

World War Memorial Stadium, more commonly known as War Memorial Stadium, is a baseball park in Greensboro, North Carolina, United States. It is situated on the northeast corner of Lindsay Street and Yanceyville Avenue, northeast of the downtown area and near the campus of North Carolina A&T University. It is currently the home of the NC A&T baseball team of the NCAA Division I Colonial Athletic Association (CAA).

It was the home of various local minor league baseball clubs off-and-on from 1930 through 2004. It also continues to be used for other amateur baseball events. It was also the home of A&T football until Aggie Stadium was opened in 1981. Two local high schools played their football games at Memorial Stadium over the years: Greensboro Senior High School (now Grimsley High School) played its home football games there from 1927 through 1948, before its on-campus stadium opened in 1949. And Dudley High School held home football games at the stadium until the late 1970s when a stadium was constructed on its campus.

== History ==
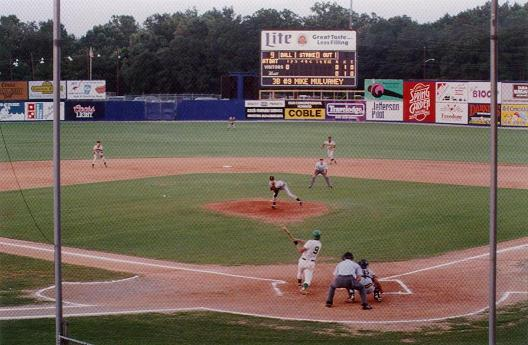
Game action in 1989

World War Memorial Stadium was dedicated on the eighth anniversary of Armistice Day, on November 11, 1926. At the time, there had of course only been the one World War.

The stadium was originally built mostly with American football in mind, resembling a backwards "J" and with a running track. In 1930 the Greensboro Patriots of the old Piedmont League set up shop there, after a few decades of off and on play at Cone Athletic Park (0.7-miles to the northeast), and made various improvements such as the installation of lights and a roof for the box seat area.

The field was initially laid out with the diamond centered on the curved part of the "J", with short foul lines and a deep center field, like a very-scaled-down version of the Polo Grounds. Later the diamond was rotated clockwise and repositioned, and the field assumed a fairly normal shape except for right center, which was abnormally close due to the presence of a creek.

The ballpark's age and its cramped quarters began to be a notable problem for the minor league club once the minor league explosion of the late 1980s and early 1990s was under way. Various cosmetic renovations were made, such as building a kind of stadium club ("The Grandstand") in the left field corner seats, as well as a fairly large concession stand outside the third base stands. The stadium also received many seats from Philadelphia's old Shibe Park after Shibe's demolition.

Another issue was the condition of the field. With so many games being played there by the Patriots (later renamed the "Hornets" and then the "Bats") along with the college teams, the turf took a serious beating during the long hot North Carolina summer, and required frequent replacement with new turf.

In order to put the city in a position to possibly upgrade to AA level ball, in the early 1990s the minor league club owners began lobbying for a new ballpark. Their efforts finally succeeded in the early 2000s, and the new First Horizon Park (now known as First National Bank Field) opened downtown in spring 2005.

== Archways and plaques ==
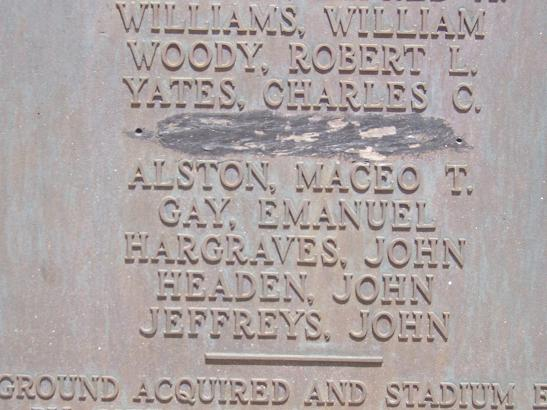
WWMS plaque detail

One of the stadium's notable features is an ornate, triple-arched entrance, which made a cameo appearance during the "road trip" segment of the 1988 movie Bull Durham. During the minor league club's tenure, the three arches were decorated with quarter-sphere awnings covered in red, white, and blue cloth respectively.

The stadium has a pair of bronze plaques framing the archway and listing the area's war dead during 1917–1919. Close examination of the right-side plaque reveals that there were actually two alphabetical lists. Some sources say that this was a separation of white from "colored" in the conventional practice of the segregation era. The marker between the two lists was later roughly chiseled away.

It was listed on the National Register of Historic Places in 2001.

== Dimensions ==
After the field was rotated...

- Left Field – 327 ft (100 m)
- Left Center Field – 387 ft (118 m)
- Center Field – 401 ft (122 m)
- Right Center Field – 337 ft (103 m)
- Right Field – 327 ft (100 m)

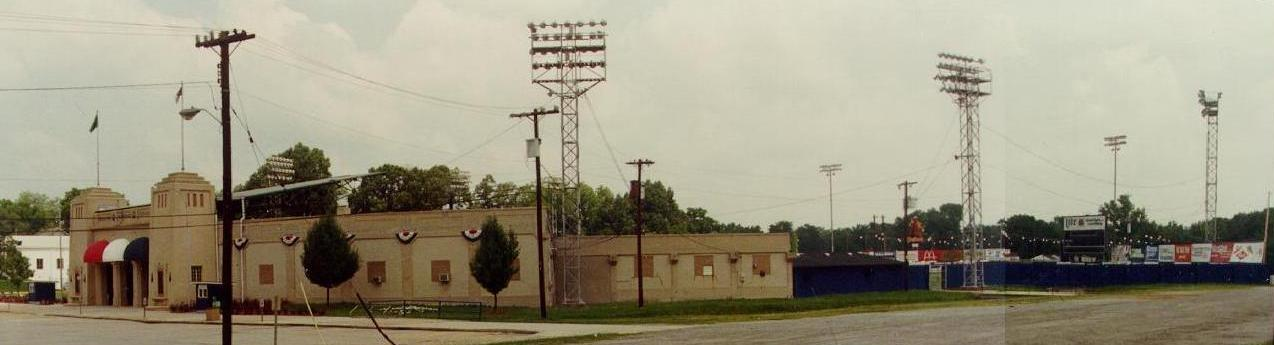
World War Memorial Stadium as it looked in 1989

== See also ==
- List of NCAA Division I baseball venues
