= South Side Park (Winston-Salem) =

Baseball park in Winston-Salem, North Carolina, US

South Side Park a.k.a. Southside Park was the name of two baseball parks in Winston-Salem, North Carolina. The second one being the home field of the Winston-Salem minor league ball clubs prior to the opening of Ernie Shore Field in 1956, constructed after fire destroyed the old wooden South Side venue.

The first park opened in 1892. While the exact location is not known, newspaper accounts of the era place it near and south of the Forsyth Chair Factory located on the southwest corner of Sunnyside Avenue and Acadia Avenue. It was used for baseball and football, both between local teams as well as in-state colleges and their foes, and other events. No formal name has been found, but it was alternatively called "South Side Park", "South Side Athletic Park", and "Southside Park".

The second ballpark was bounded by Waughtown Street (east, right field) where Fayetteville Street T's into it; railroad tracks and South Main Street (west, third base); and the imaginary line of Vintage Street (south, first base). City directories gave the location as "southwest corner Waughtown and Fayetteville".

After the fire, the land was redeveloped. The approximate footprint of the site is now occupied by the University of North Carolina School of the Arts.
