= Raleigh Capitals =

- (1900–1902, 1908–1910, 1913–1917, 1921–1928, 1945–1953, 1958–1967); Raleigh, North Carolina

Minor league affiliations
- Previous classes: Class A (1963–1967); Class B (1932, 1949–1962); Class C (1901–1902, 1921–1931, 1945–1948); Class D (1908–1920)
- Previous leagues: Carolina League (1945–1953, 1958–1967); Piedmont League (1921–1928); North Carolina State League (1913–1917); Eastern Carolina League (1908–1910); North Carolina League (1902); Virginia-North Carolina League (1901); North Carolina Association (1900)

Major league affiliations
- Previous teams: Pittsburgh Pirates (1966–1967); St. Louis Cardinals (1964–1965); New York Mets (1963); Washington Senators (1962); Boston Red Sox (1958–1960); Boston Braves (1946); Cincinnati Reds (1945)

Minor league titles
- League titles: 4 (1901, 1921, 1946, 1947)

Team data
- Previous names: Raleigh Pirates (1966–1967); Raleigh Cardinals (1964–1965); Raleigh Mets (1963); Raleigh Capitals (1913–1917, 1922–1928, 1931–1932, 1945–1953, 1958–1962); Raleigh Red Birds (1902, 1908–1910, 1921); Raleigh Senators (1901)
- Ballpark: Devereaux Meadow (1945–1953, 1957–1967)

The Raleigh Capitals was a name used by various minor league baseball teams that were based in Raleigh, North Carolina. Most of these teams played at Devereaux Meadow.

There have been minor league baseball teams in the past that played in Raleigh using the name Capitals. Some of these Raleigh teams also used names such as Senators, Red Birds, Nats, Mets, Cardinals, and Pirates.

The last Raleigh franchise existed from 1958–1967 and played in Carolina League. This team merged into the Durham, North Carolina–based Durham Bulls in 1968 who also played in the Carolina League (now playing in the International League).

== History of baseball in Raleigh ==
Raleigh's first professional baseball franchise dates back to 1900 in the form of the Raleigh Senators of the North Carolina Association. The Senators moved to the Virginia–North Carolina League in 1901. The team then switched leagues again to the North Carolina League and changed their name to the Raleigh Red Birds. The team folded after the 1902 season.

In 1908, a new franchise was formed and began playing in the Eastern Carolina League. This franchise took up the name Red Birds. The second Red Birds franchise folded after the 1910 season.

In 1913, another franchise formed and began playing in the North Carolina State League. This team took up the name Raleigh Capitals (first Raleigh team called Capitals). The team folded after the 1917 season.

In 1920, a new franchise called the Raleigh Nats formed and began playing in the Piedmont League. The team was renamed Red Birds (third Raleigh team to be called Red Birds) in 1921 and was renamed Capitals, reusing the Capitals moniker. This team operated from 1920–1928. The team then folded after that.

The last Raleigh franchise which also was the last team to take up the Capitals name was formed in 1958 and began playing in the Carolina League as the Capitals from 1958–1962, Mets in 1963, Cardinals in 1964 and 1965, and finally Pirates in 1966 and 1967. The rival Durham, North Carolina based Durham Bulls franchise who also played in the Carolina League and were a New York Mets affiliate acquired the Raleigh franchise. The Raleigh team then merged into the Durham Bulls. The result was that the Durham Bulls continued as the same franchise while maintaining their affiliation with the Mets and the Raleigh team ceased operations. Despite the Durham Bulls continued as the same franchise, the Bulls were renamed Raleigh-Durham Mets and split their home games between their home stadium Durham Athletic Park in Durham and at Devereaux Meadow in Raleigh for the 1968 season. The team then played as the Phillies as a Philadelphia Phillies affiliate in 1969 and Triangles for the 1970 and 1971 seasons and disbanded in 1972. The Durham franchise reformed in 1980 under their original name "Durham Bulls" and returned to the Carolina League as an Atlanta Braves affiliate. The Bulls now play in the International League at the Triple-A level as a Tampa Bay Rays affiliate.

== Today ==
Despite Raleigh not having a professional baseball team since 1972, the area still has professional baseball. The Durham, North Carolina based Durham Bulls are the current minor league baseball team in the area. The Durham Bulls were one of the rival clubs that played against Raleigh baseball teams between the years of 1913–1967.

The Carolina Mudcats played at Five County Stadium in Zebulon, North Carolina from 1991 to 2025, before moving to Wilson, North Carolina and rebranding to become the Wilson Warbirds.

== Notable Raleigh alumni ==
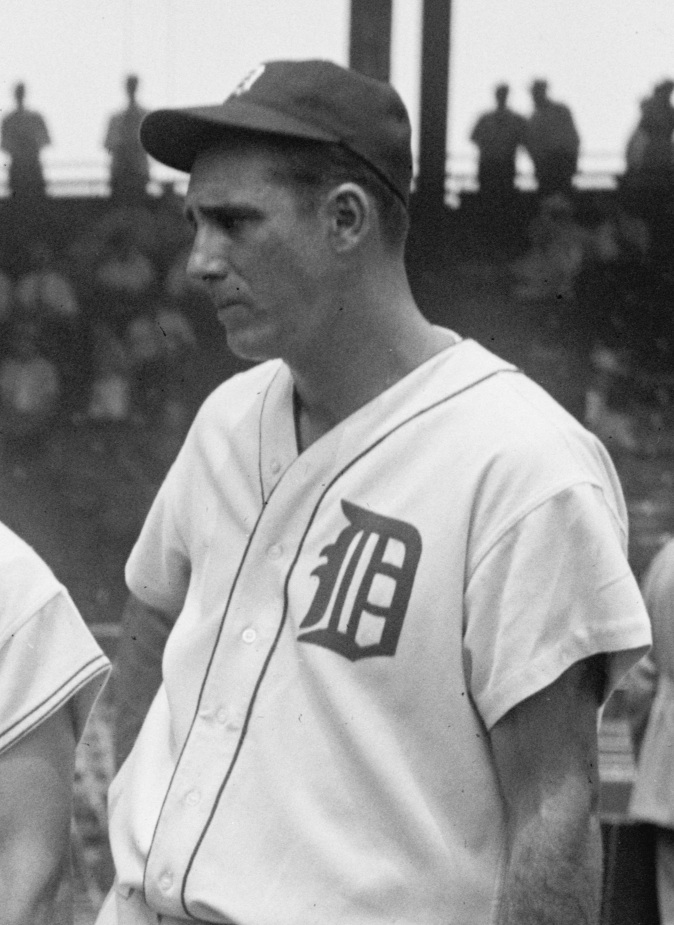
Hank Greenberg

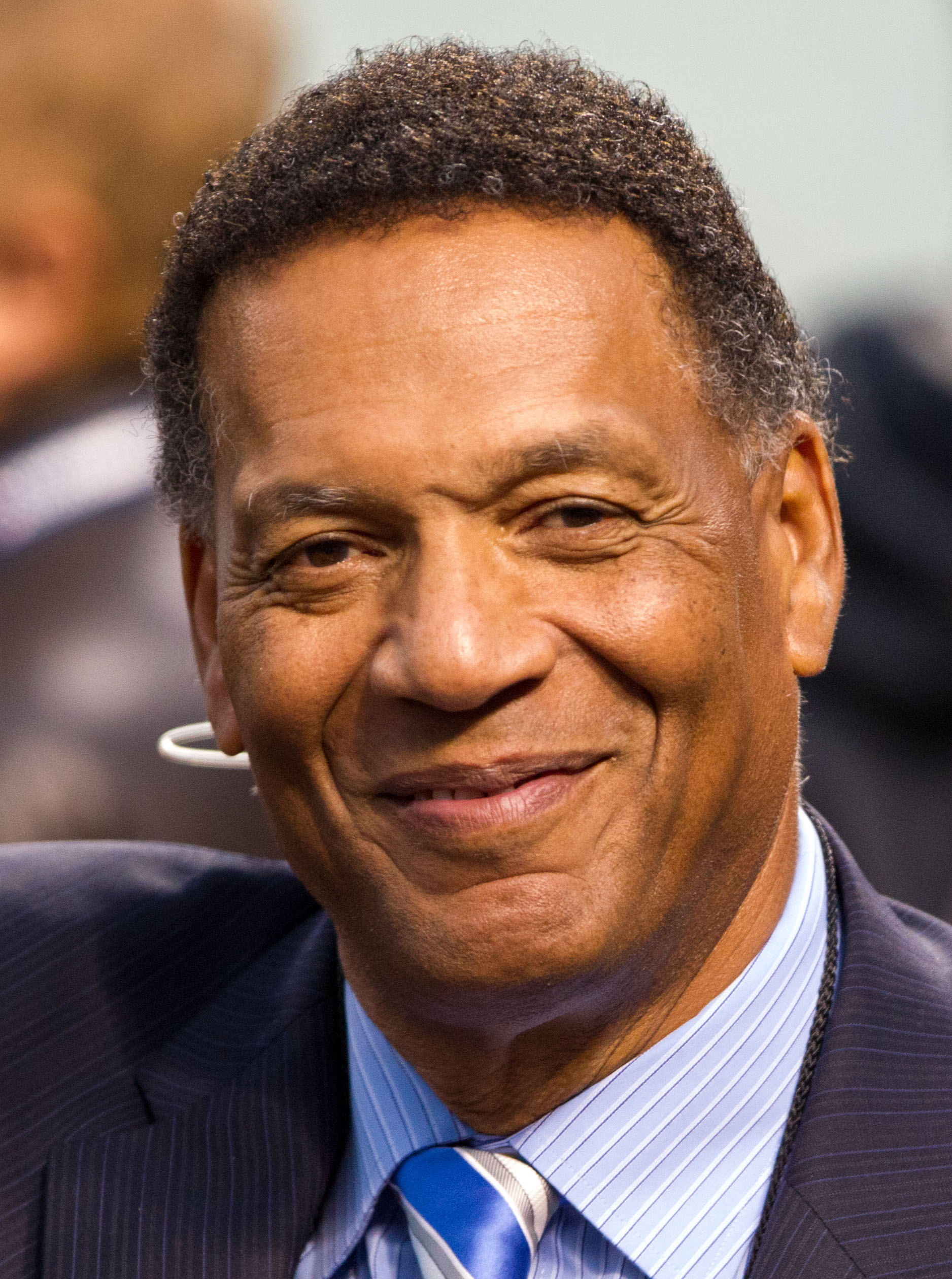
Ken Singleton

Hall of Fame alumni

- Hank Greenberg (1930) Inducted, 1956
- Enos Slaughter (1961, MGR) Inducted, 1985
- Carl Yastrzemski (1959) Inducted, 1989

Other notable alumni

- Jim Bibby (1968) MLB All-Star
- Bob Boone (1969) 4 x MLB All-Star
- Gene Clines (1967)
- Galen Cisco (1958-1959)
- Crash Davis (1949-1952)
- Rawly Eastwick (1971) 2 × NL saves leader (1975, 1976)
- Gene Garber (1966-1967)
- Cliff Johnson (1970)
- Cleon Jones (1963) MLB All-Star
- Greg Luzinski (1969) 4 x MLB All-Star; 1975 NL RBI leader
- Jon Matlack (1968) 3 x MLB All-Star; 1972 NL Rookie of the Year
- Bob Moose (1966)
- Jerry Morales (1968) MLB All-Star
- Al Oliver (1966) 7 x MLB All-Star
- Dick Radatz (1959-1960) 2 x MLB All-Star
- Manny Sanguillén (1966) 3 x MLB All-Star
- Ken Singleton (1968) 3 x MLB All-Star
- Mike Torrez (1965) MLB All-Star
- Wilbur Wood (1960) 3 x MLB All-Star
