= Burlington Rangers =

Minor league baseball team from Burlington, North Carolina

- 1942–1972; Burlington, North Carolina

Minor league affiliations
- Class: A
- Previous classes: D (1942); C (1945-1948); B (1949-1962); A (1962-1972)
- Previous leagues: Bi-State League (1942); Carolina League (1945-1955; 1958-1972)

Major league affiliations
- Team: Texas Rangers (1972)
- Previous teams: Unaffliated (1942, 1945-1951); Pittsburgh Pirates (1952-1955); Cleveland Indians (1958–1964); Washington Senators (1965-1971)

Team data
- Previous names: Burlington Bees (1942, 1945–1951); Burlington-Graham Pirates (1952–1955); Burlington Indians (1958–1964); Burlington Senators (1965–1971)

The Burlington Rangers were the final Moniker of a series of minor league baseball teams based in Burlington, North Carolina that existed (with short gaps) between 1942 and 1972. Burlington teams played as members of the Bi-State League (1942) and Carolina League (1945-1955; 1958-1972).

The first Burlington team was the Burlington Bees of the Class-D Bi-State League, who played in 1942, the final season of that league. (Note: This team should not be confused with the Burlington Bees of the Midwest League or Prospect League, who play in Burlington, Iowa.)

After World War II, the Burlington Bees franchise was revived in the Class-C Carolina League for the 1945 season. (The Carolina League rose to Class-B in 1949.) They played as the Bees through the 1951 season, without a major league affiliation. They played well during these seasons, making the playoffs in every season but 1951, and winning the playoffs in 1949.

Starting in 1952, they became affiliates of the Pittsburgh Pirates, and changed their name to the Burlington-Graham Pirates. This situation remained in place for four seasons, through 1955, during which the team only made the playoffs once. After the 1955 season, the team folded and did not participate in the 1956 or 1957 seasons.

The Burlington franchise was reborn in 1958 as an affiliate of the Cleveland Indians, and they took the moniker of the Burlington Indians. They won the championship in their first year back, in 1958. They kept this name and affiliation through the 1964 season.

The team changed affiliations once more in 1965, becoming an affiliate of the Washington Senators and changing their name to the Burlington Senators. After the 1971 season, the Washington Senators relocated to Arlington, Texas, and became the Texas Rangers. Burlington changed its name a final time to reflect their affiliation, becoming the Burlington Rangers. They played a final season in 1972 before folding.

Starting in 1986, Burlington would get an unrelated minor league team, this time in the Appalachian League. They started as the Burlington Indians, then became the Burlington Royals. As of 2025, Burlington hosts the Burlington Sock Puppets of the summer collegiate Appalachian League.

== Notable alumni ==
- Tommie Agee (1962) 2 x MLB All-Star; 1966 AL Rookie of the Year
- Gene Conley (1964) 4 x MLB All Star
- Dick Hall (1952)
- Toby Harrah (1968-1969) 4 x MLB All-Star
- Ron Kline (1952)
- Jack McKeon (1952) Manager: 2003 World Series Champion - Florida Marlins
- Sonny Siebert (1960) 2 x MLB All-Star
- Luis Tiant (1963) 3 x MLB All-Star; 2 x AL ERA Title (1968, 1972)
- John Wockenfuss (1969)
