= Danville Leafs =

- Founded in 1905; Danville, Virginia

Minor league affiliations
- Previous classes: Class C (1905)
- League: Carolina League (1945–1958)
- Previous leagues: Bi-State League (1934–1942); Piedmont League (1920–1926); Virginia League (1906–1912); Virginia–North Carolina League (1905)

Major league affiliations
- Previous teams: San Francisco Giants (1958); New York Giants (1943–1947; 1953–1957); Washington Senators (1952); Boston Red Sox (1939–1942)

Team data
- Previous names: Danville Leafs (1934–1958); Danville Tobaccoists (1905, 1920–1924); Danville Red Sox (1906–1912)
- Previous parks: League Park

The Danville Leafs were a professional minor league baseball team that played in the city of Danville, Virginia. During 1935–1942, they were also known as the Danville-Schoolfield Leafs. (Note: Schoolfield was a village established in 1903, and annexed by Danville in 1951; it is not to be confused with Scholfield, Virginia.)

== History ==
Professional baseball first made its appearance in Danville in 1905 when the town fielded a team, the Tobacconists, in the short-lived Class C Virginia–North Carolina League. Several other professional teams came and went in the town but it was not until 1925 that the name "Leafs" was first used. The name refers to the famous tobacco leaf markets of the town. The Leafs, who played in the Piedmont League, relocated during the 1926 season, again leaving Danville without professional baseball.

A new Leafs team was formed in 1934 as a member of the Class D Bi-State League. The team remained a part of that league, which included teams from towns along both sides of the North Carolina-Virginia border, for five seasons. The Leafs won pennants in 1934 and 1935.

In 1945, another incarnation of the Danville Leafs took the field as members of the newly formed Carolina League. They were a member of the New York Giants (San Francisco Giants) farm system. The team existed through the 1958 season. In 1945, Danville pitcher Art Fowler led the league with 23 wins. He went on to have a long major league career as both a player and coach. In 1953, Leafs' pitcher Ramon Monzant (23-6, 232 strikeouts) won the Carolina League Most Valuable Player award. He went on to spend a few seasons with the Giants. Willie McCovey played first base for the 1956 Danville Leafs. He hit .310 with 29 home runs and 89 rus batted in. One of his teammates that season, outfielder Leon Wagner (.330, 51 home runs, 166 runs batted in), also had an outstanding big league career.

The team was the first in the Carolina League to become racially integrated when Percy Miller Jr. joined the team in 1951.

Professional baseball returned to Danville in 1993 when the Pulaski Braves of the rookie level Appalachian League relocated to Danville as the Danville Braves. A farm team of the Atlanta Braves, the team has been the starting point for many players who have gone on to the major leagues.

== Notable players ==
- Sparky Adams (1920)
- Art Fowler (1945)
- Willie McCovey (1957) inducted into the Baseball Hall of Fame in 1986
- Ray Morgan (1911)
- Manny Mota (1958) MLB All-Star
- Bob Schmidt (1955) MLB All-Star
- Joe Stripp (1924)
- Tony Taylor (1956) 2 x MLB All-Star
- Leon Wagner (1956) 3 x MLB All-Star
- Bill White (1953) 8 x MLB All-Star
- Hal Woodeshick (1955) MLB All-Star
