= Dave Sappelt =

American baseball player (born 1987)

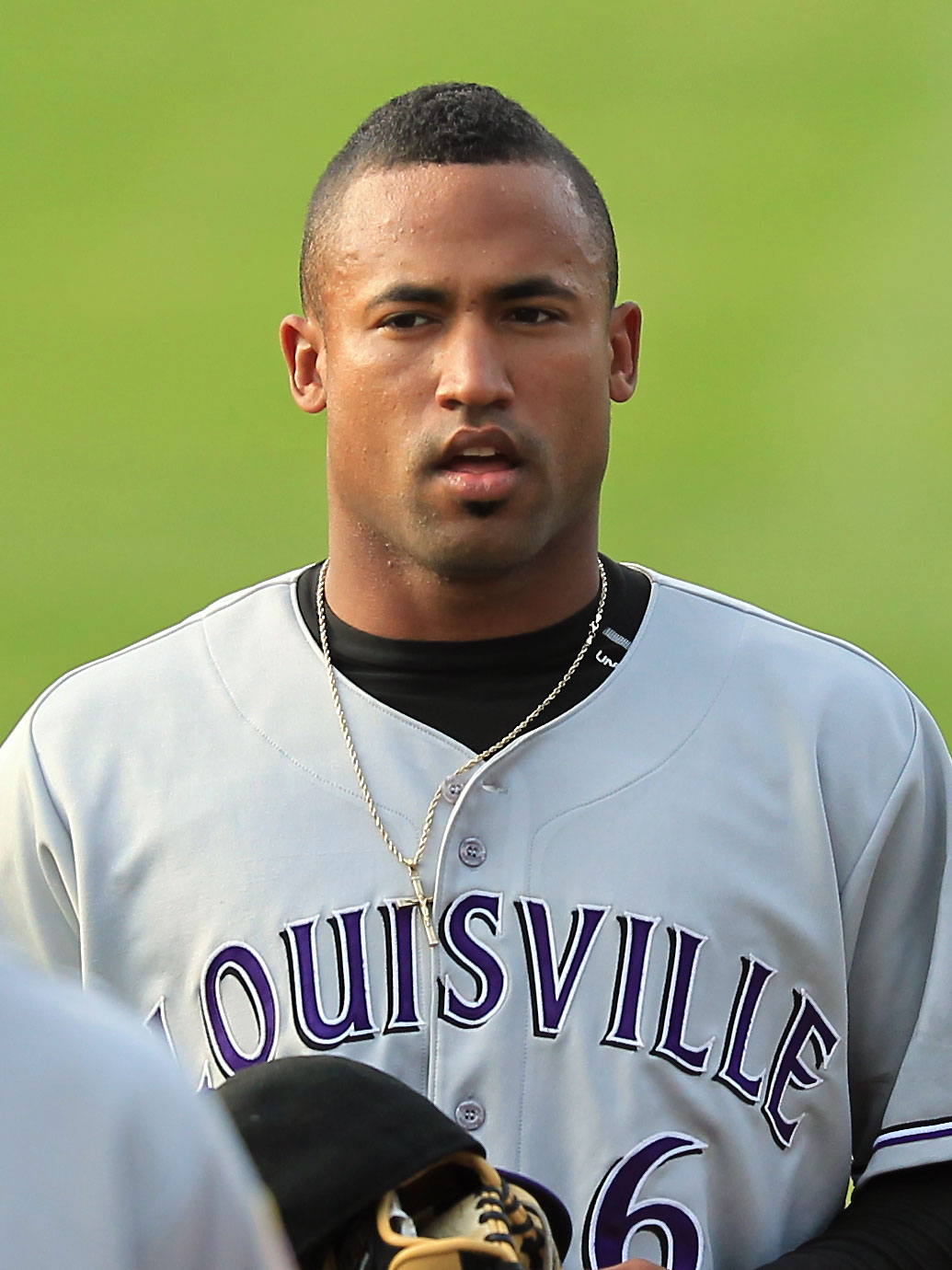
- Sappelt with the Louisville Bats in 2009
- Outfielder
- Born: January 2, 1987 (age 39); Buffalo, New York, U.S.
- Batted: Right Threw: Right

MLB debut
- August 7, 2011, for the Cincinnati Reds

Last MLB appearance
- July 23, 2013, for the Chicago Cubs

MLB statistics
- Batting average: .251
- Home runs: 2
- Runs batted in: 17
- Stats at Baseball Reference

Teams
- Cincinnati Reds (2011); Chicago Cubs (2012–2013)

David J. Sappelt (born January 2, 1987) is an American former professional baseball outfielder. He played in Major League Baseball (MLB) for the Cincinnati Reds and Chicago Cubs. He is 5 feet 9 inches (1.75 m) and weighs 195 pounds (88 kg). He bats and throws right handed. He graduated from Southern Alamance High School in Graham, North Carolina. Sappelt played college baseball at Coastal Carolina University.

== Early life ==
Sappelt attended Southern Alamance High School in Graham, North Carolina. During his senior year, he helped lead the Southern Alamance baseball team to the 2005 North Carolina 3A state title. Following high school, Sappelt played collegiate baseball at Coastal Carolina University.

== Professional career ==
=== Cincinnati Reds ===
The Cincinnati Reds drafted Sappelt in the 9th round, with the 269th overall selection, of the 2008 Major League Baseball draft. He played 2008 for the rookie-level Billings Mustangs. Sappelt hit .299 with seven home runs and 35 RBI in 254 at-bats. He had 301 at-bats for Single-A Dayton Dragons in 2009, hitting .269 with three home runs and 25 RBI; in 251 at-bats for the High-A Sarasota Reds he hit .295 with four home runs and 21 RBI.

Sappelt started 2010 with the High-A Lynchburg Hillcats. He hit .282 with no home runs and four RBI in 71 at-bats. Sappelt was promoted to the Double-A Carolina Mudcats, and hit .361 with nine home runs and 62 RBI in 330 at-bats. He was a mid- and post-season All-Star in the Southern League for the Mudcats, and was named Southern League Most Valuable Player. Sappelt's performance earned him a promotion to Triple-A Louisville Bats, where he hit .324 with one home run and eight RBI in 108 at-bats for the Bats. His season totals for 2010 were 509 at-bats, .342 average, 10 home runs, and 74 RBI. Sappelt was named the Reds' Minor League Hitter of the Year. His season performance earned him a trip to the prestigious Arizona Fall League, where he hit .292 in 72 at-bats with no home runs and 10 RBI. Sappelt also played in the Venezuelan Winter League, batting .305 with one home run and 10 RBI in 118 at-bats. He received a non-roster invitation to spring training for 2011.

Sappelt was invited to the major league spring training camp in 2011 as a non-roster invitee. He backed up his award as Reds Minor League Hitter of the Year by hitting .564 (22-for-38), along with three homers and 12 RBI. However, Sappelt was cut from the Reds roster late in spring. Manager Dusty Baker said that a lot of the decision had to do with the fact that Sappelt was not on the 40-man roster, which at the time was full.

Sappelt went back to Louisville for the 2011 season, and continued hitting. Through his first 74 games as the Bats' center fielder, he hit .313 with seven home runs and 29 RBI, including a .358 average against lefties. After Chris Heisey injured his oblique in batting practice and was placed on the 15-day disabled list, Sappelt was called up to the major leagues for the first time on August 7, 2011. He made his MLB debut against the Chicago Cubs, leading off and playing left field.

=== Chicago Cubs ===
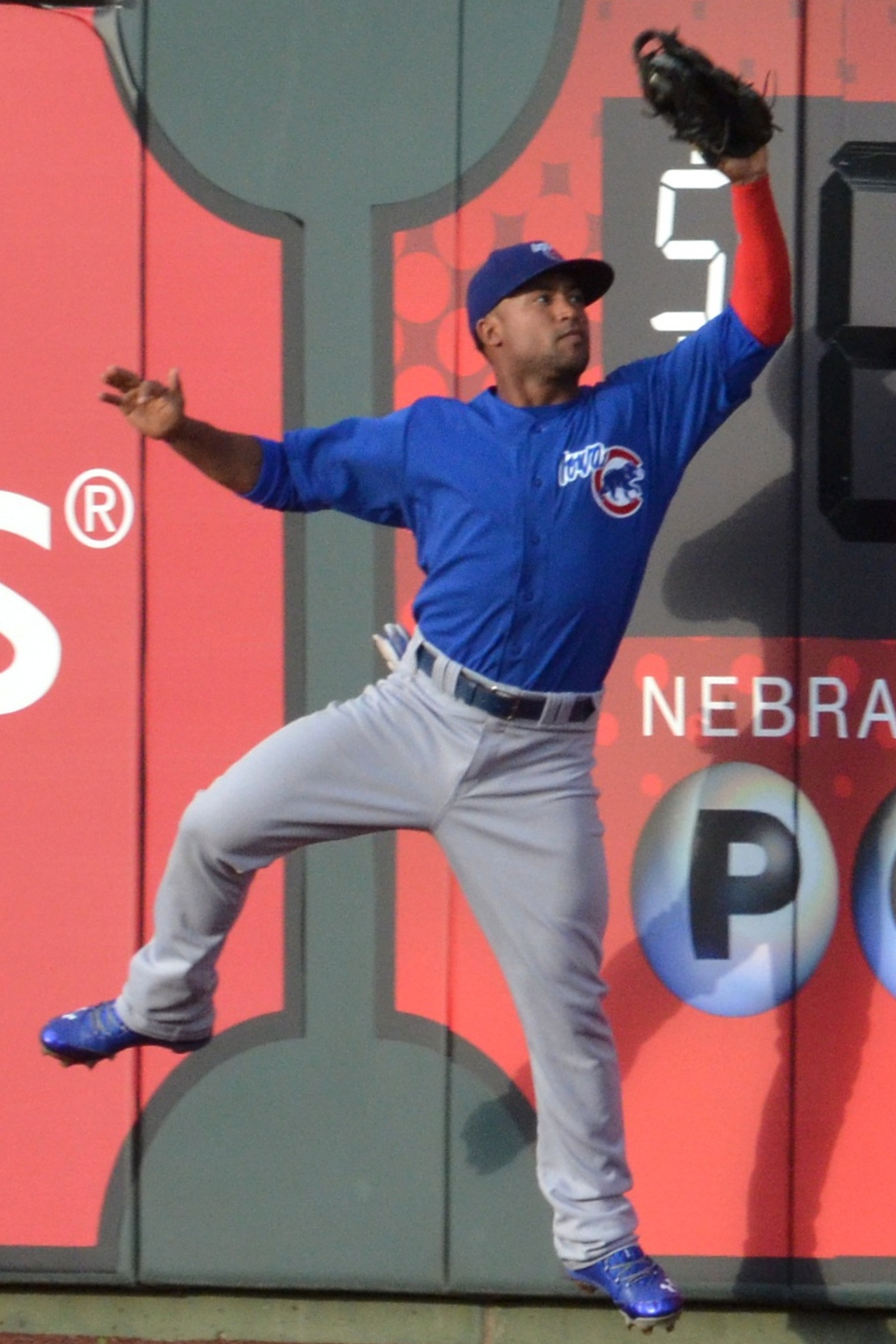
Sappelt playing the Iowa Cubs, triple-A affiliates of the Chicago Cubs, in 2013

On December 23, 2011, Sappelt was traded with Travis Wood and Ronald Torreyes to the Chicago Cubs in exchange for Sean Marshall. Sappelt made 26 appearances for the Cubs during the 2012 season, batting .275/.351/.449 with two home runs and eight RBI.

On May 6, 2013, Sappelt was optioned to the Triple-A Iowa Cubs. In 31 appearances for Chicago, he slashed .240/.269/.280 with four RBI and three stolen bases. Sappelt was designated for assignment by the Cubs on September 3. He cleared waivers and was sent outright to Triple-A Iowa on September 5.

=== Acereros de Monclova ===
On December 18, 2013, the Philadelphia Phillies signed Sappelt to a minor league contract, that included a spring training invitation. He was released prior to the start of the season on April 3, 2014.

On June 24, 2014, Sappelt signed with the Acereros de Monclova of the Mexican League. In 13 games for Monclova, Sappelt batted .400/.446/.480 with no home runs and six RBI.

=== Rojos del Águila de Veracruz ===
On July 9, 2014, Sappelt was traded to the Rojos del Águila de Veracruz. In 33 games for Veracruz, Sappelt hit .275/.331/.374 with no home runs, 10 RBI, and four stolen bases.

=== Piratas de Campeche ===
On February 11, 2015, Sappelt signed with the Piratas de Campeche of the Mexican League. In 54 appearances for the Pirates, Sappelt batted .335/.398/.546 with 10 home runs, 35 RBI, and five stolen bases.

=== Boston Red Sox ===
On June 9, 2015, Sappelt signed a minor league contract with the Boston Red Sox. In 8 games for the Double-A Portland Sea Dogs, he went 6-for-29 (.207) with 2 home runs and 2 RBI. Sappelt elected free agency following the season on November 6.

=== Sultanes de Monterrey ===
On June 28, 2016, Sappelt was traded to the Sultanes de Monterrey of the Mexican League. In 39 games for the team, he batted .371/.397/.537 with four home runs, 27 RBI, and two stolen bases.

=== Olmecas de Tabasco ===
On February 27, 2017, Sappelt was traded to the Olmecas de Tabasco of the Mexican League. In 14 games for Tabasco, he batted .250/.288/.375 with one home run, three RBI, and one stolen base. Sappelt was released by the Olmecas on April 17.

=== Rieleros de Aguascalientes ===
On May 5, 2017, Sappelt signed with the Rieleros de Aguascalientes of the Mexican League. In 80 appearances for Aguascalientes, he slashed .288/.375/.464 with 12 home runs, 40 RBI, and four stolen bases. Sappelt was released by the Rieleros on November 11.

=== Southern Maryland Blue Crabs ===
On May 27, 2018, Sappelt signed with the Southern Maryland Blue Crabs of the Atlantic League of Professional Baseball. In 7 games for the Blue Crabs, he went 5-for-27 (.185) with one home run and two RBI. Sappelt was released by the team on June 7.

=== Winnipeg Goldeyes ===
On June 13, 2018, Sappelt signed with the Winnipeg Goldeyes of the American Association of Independent Professional Baseball. In 28 games for Winnipeg, he batted .250/.351/.371 with two home runs, 14 RBI, and one stolen base.

=== Tigres de Quintana Roo ===
On July 15, 2018, Sappelt signed with the Tigres de Quintana Roo of the Mexican League. In 13 appearances for Quintana Roo, he batted .308/.377/.404 with one home run, five RBI, and one stolen base. Sappelt was released by the Tigres on July 30.
