= Graham Historic District =

Historic district in North Carolina, United States

- U.S. National Register of Historic Places
- U.S. Historic district
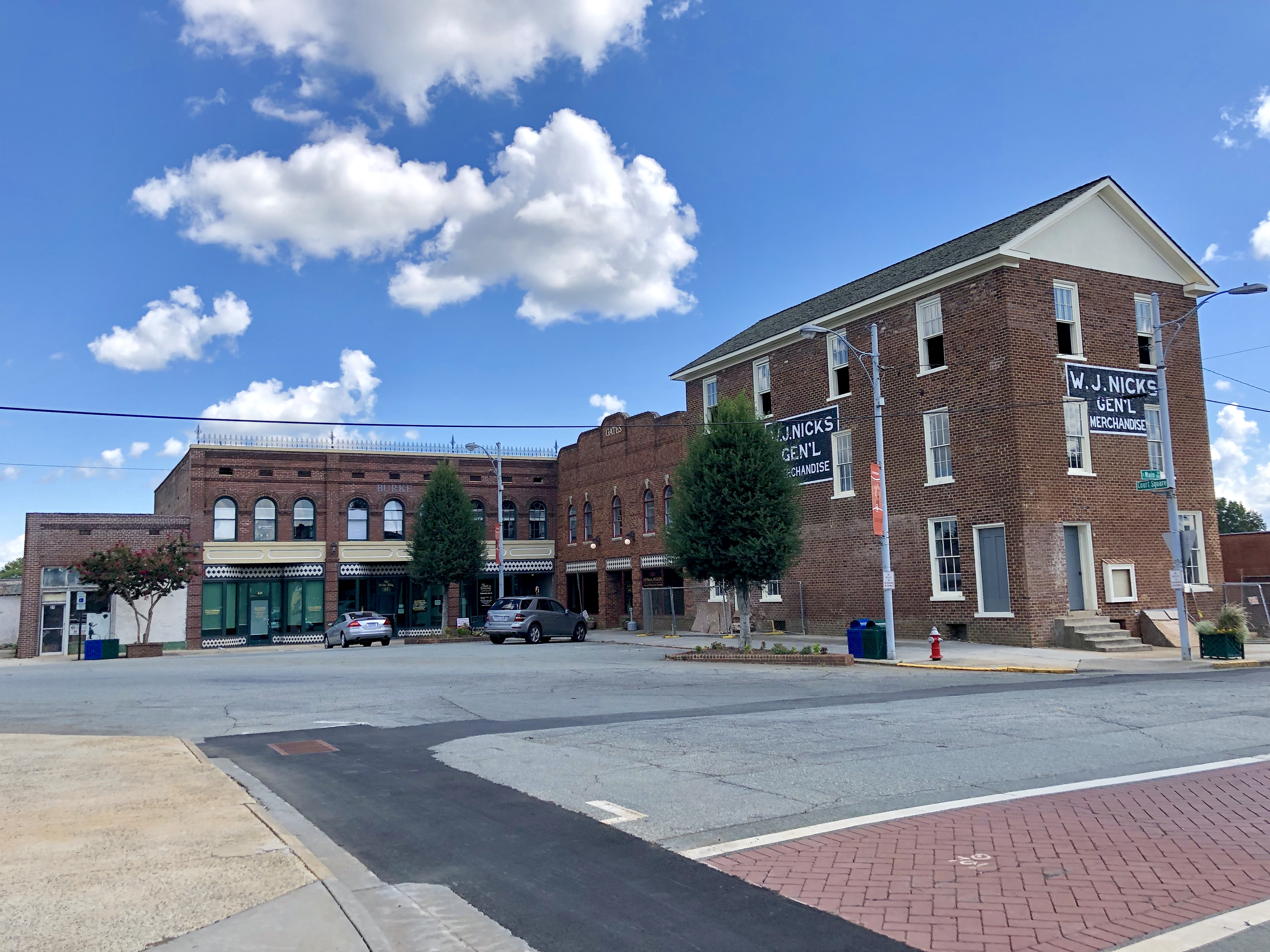
- SW Corner of Court Square, Downtown Graham

- Location within North Carolina Location within the United States
- Location: E. and W. Harden, E. and W. Elm, N. and S. Main and W. Pine Sts., Graham, North Carolina
- Coordinates: 36°04′08″N 79°24′09″W
- Area: 21 acres (8.5 ha)
- Built: 1849
- Architect: Multiple
- Architectural style: Late 19th And 20th Century Revivals, Late Victorian
- NRHP reference No.: 83001834
- Added to NRHP: April 7, 1983

Graham Historic District is a national historic district located at Graham, Alamance County, North Carolina. It encompasses 72 contributing buildings and 1 contributing structure in the central business district of Graham. The district includes a variety of institutional, commercial, and residential buildings largely dating from the 19th century. Notable buildings include the Alamance County Courthouse, the centerpiece of the district; Graham Presbyterian Church; Harden House; Hunter House; Nicks Store; McBride Holt House (c. 1885); Scott Building (c. 1900); Vestal Hotel; Holt-Scott General·Store (c. 1850-1860); National Bank of Alamance (c. 1906); Mont-White Theatre; and Paris Building (c. 1912).

It was added to the National Register of Historic Places in 1983.
