= Walter M. Williams High School =

American public school in North Carolina

Location
- 1307 South Church Street; Burlington, North Carolina 27215; United States; 36°05′19″N 79°27′14″W

Information
- Motto: Learners today, Leaders tomorrow (adopted 2010)
- Established: 1951 (75 years ago)
- School district: Alamance-Burlington School System, 1996–present (Burlington City Schools, 1951–1996)
- Superintendent: Dain Butler
- CEEB code: 340520
- Principal: Curry E. Bryan, IV
- Faculty: 66.52 (FTE)
- Grades: 9–12
- Enrollment: 1,169 (2018–19)
- Student to teacher ratio: 17.57
- Schedule type: Modified Block
- Colors: Black and gold
- Mascot: Bulldog (George and Georgette)
- Website: www.abss.k12.nc.us/o/wwhs

Walter M. Williams High School, the flagship school of the Alamance-Burlington School System, is a high school (grades 9–12) in Burlington, North Carolina, United States. It was named in honor of philanthropist, industrialist, and former Burlington City Schools chairman Walter M. Williams (1891–1959). The school entered its eighth decade of operation in the 2022 school year.

It has been recognized by the United States Department of Education as one of the top six high schools in North Carolina, and received the Blue Ribbon School designation in 1993. As of 2008, 30% of the staff held advanced degrees, and eleven staff members held national board teacher certification.

The campus is bordered on the north by Sunset Drive and Parkview Drive, to the east by Arlington Avenue, to the southeast by South Church Street (on which street the campus actually has its address), to the south by Country Club Drive (an homage to the property being the former site of a country club), and to the west by Tarleton Avenue. Bulldog Alley, a north–south private campus street, intersects the campus with athletic facilities to the west and academic facilities to the east.

== Academy of Finance ==
Williams is home to the Academy of Finance, a Career and Technical Education program that is administered in collaboration with the National Academy Foundation, a national network of high school reform focused on smaller learning communities that focus in areas such as health sciences, tourism, entertainment, or finance along with other options. Established in 2005, the Academy provides a rigorous curriculum, enhanced by opportunities to build professional relationships with area finance and business leaders, as well as demonstrate relevance through community based internship and service-learning experiences. As part of this small learning community, students have contributed to service and social justice by providing tax assistance to low income families and individuals, some of whom have contributed almost 100 service hours to the project annually. In addition, students take college level courses for credit, hear guest presentations from members of the business community, participate in internships, and take exploratory field trips to area colleges and universities. A partnership with Alamance Community College makes the college level coursework possible.

== Academics ==
Williams has a strong Advanced Placement and Honors program. During the 2008–2009 school year, 211 students took 535 Advanced Placement courses, the highest number of students taking the courses in the district.

== Demographics ==
As of the spring of 2014, nationalities represented in the student body in recent years included the United States, Bangladesh, Bosnia, Canada, Chile, China, Colombia, Croatia, El Salvador, Greece, Honduras, India, Indonesia, Iran, Japan, Korea, Kosovo, Mexico, New Zealand (Māori), Nicaragua, Pakistan, Palestine, Peru, and Vietnam. Demographically, the student population is 52% white, 32% African-American, 10% Hispanic, 4% Asian, and 2% multiracial.

== Partnerships with Elon University ==
Along with the other high schools in Alamance County, selected students from Williams are able to participate in the Elon Academy summer residential program on the campus of Elon University. Students are eligible to take college courses during the regular school year. Williams hosts student teachers from Elon on a regular basis.

== Namesake ==
The school was named for Walter McAdoo Williams (March 1, 1891 – May 5, 1959), a native of Liberty, Randolph County, North Carolina, and son of Joel P. and Flora A. Spoon Williams. Considered a "giant in the textile world,” he was a member of the board of trustees of what is now Wake Forest University and a local citizen recognized for his role in making the high school possible from a financial standpoint. In April 1912, at the age of twenty-one, he moved to Graham, North Carolina. From 1930 to 1940, he served as chair of the Burlington School District's school board. He was also executive vice president and chairman of the board of Virginia Mills, based in Swepsonville, North Carolina. In 1940, he became executive vice president and chairman of the board for Virginia Cotton Mills in Swepsonville, from which he retired on February 17, 1959. In 1945, the Williamses made the purchase of the campus land possible. When the possibility was raised that the seating capacity in the proposed auditorium would be substantially reduced, they made it possible to retain the planned 2,500 seat capacity. It is believed that the auditorium is the second largest high school auditorium on the East Coast. They also donated the auditorium's four manual, 63 rank Standaart classical pipe organ as well as a Steinway grand piano. They were resistant to the idea of the school being named for them, and were informed of the name by a reporter. A member of both Kiwanis and Lions, Williams actively supported the Baptist Orphanage in Thomasville, North Carolina and the Masonic Orphanage in Oxford, North Carolina. The Williamses had no children of their own. In 1950, Williams was named Citizen of the Year by the Burlington Kiwanis Club.

Williams served on the board of trustees of Wake Forest University during the period of the institution's transition from rural Wake County to Winston-Salem. In addition to the Williams's contributions to the high school, the organ in Wait Chapel on the Reynolda campus of Wake Forest University is named in honor of him and his wife Flonie Cooper Williams (1893–1975). The Williams donated the organ to Wake Forest in 1956. In addition, a three-manual Reuter organ was given and installed as a memorial to Williams in Binkley Chapel on the Olde Campus of Wake Forest. The Williamses were active in Hocutt Memorial Baptist Church. The school's colors of black and gold are the same as those of Wake Forest University, an institution with which Williams had ties. Williams was also a trustee for North Carolina Baptist Hospital.

Ironically, Mr. Williams stopped attending school at age twelve and was largely self-taught.

Williams died on May 5, 1959, after spending seven months in a coma following suffering from a brain tumor. He is buried in Pine Hill Cemetery, only a few blocks from campus, and almost within view of the school.

The Burlington Board of Education had voted in November 1945 to name the school after Williams. However, the decision was not announced until October 27, 1949.

== Mascot and traditions ==
The school seal was approved by vote of the student body on September 29, 1961, as was the school's Alma Mater, with words by athletic director Fred Miller and music by Harold Grant, director of bands. The seal was among forty potential seals submitted for consideration. The creator of the winning design received a prize of $7.00. The fightsong Onward Bulldogs is set to the tune of On Wisconsin.

The mascot is the bulldog, which has manifested itself over the years by costumed students and real dogs (one of which was named George I). An avant-garde statue of George was dedicated outside the auditorium in 1974 in memory of Cynthia Lamar Ledbetter (a student who died in 1971) and other deceased students. The statue which sits prominently on a pedestal in Bulldog Plaza on the east side of campus, is a focal point of school-wide celebrations, and is an object of scorn and derision of students from rival high schools. It was designed by sculptor Norman Keller of East Carolina University (The Barker, December 16, 1971).

School colors are black and gold, the same colors as Wake Forest University, where Williams served on the Board of Trustees.

The names of the yearbook is the Doe-Wah-Jack, an American Indian term meaning "the first, the best" and has been the name of the yearbook since the school opened in 1951 (and had been the name of the Burlington High School yearbook since 1926).

The newspaper is The Barker, taking its title from the sound made by the mascot. The newspaper has received awards from the Columbia Scholastic Press Association.

Upon the consolidation of the former Jordan Sellars High School into Williams at the time of school integration, a student task force representative of both schools attempted to incorporate traditions from both schools into the newly integrated Williams (1999 Williams Alumni Directory).

== History ==
On October 27, 1949, the school board announced its decision to name the facility "Walter M. Williams High School." It was constructed as the successor campus to Burlington High School.

The school was built on the site of the former Piedmont Country Club. "The land the school is on was once a golf course; hence, the name Country Club Dr[ive]. About ... 42 acres [of the country club were] auctioned off in September 1945 or 1946. Walter Williams bought the land from the estate of Ben May. The clubhouse (now a house) sits across from the stadium."

The stadium on the site, now known as Burlington City Schools Stadium, was dedicated on Veteran's Day, November 11, 1949. The field house was also completed in the late 1940s.

Construction began on the main building in 1949. Two cornerstones flanking the base of the front stairwell, one reading "AD" and the other "1949" attest to this fact (the cornerstone contains a sealed copper box including financial records and newspaper clippings from the period of the school's construction). The 1951 graduating class from the former Burlington High School graduated on the stage of the Williams High School Auditorium in the spring of 1951, some three months before the new school officially opened.

Williams High officially opened its doors on September 5, 1951, with an enrollment approaching 1,000 (today, it has a student body approaching 1200, and in the early 1970s surpassed 1700) and a staff of 43 (as of November 2008, the school has a combined certified and classified staff of 124).

What is now Spikes Gymnasium was completed by the opening of school in September 1955. The "Spikes Spaz" are the student supporters of Williams High's basketball teams, named for the gym's namesake, and patterned after the "Cameron Crazies" of Duke University. Prior to the completion of the gym, students in P.E. classes showered in restrooms adjacent to the cafeteria. The showers remain intact to this day. The gym was the scene of the highest points scored by any one player in the 1960s when Pistol Pete Maravich played against the Bulldogs while a student at Raleigh's Needham B. Broughton High School. The gym was the scene of a pivotal event during the period of integration.

During the 1956–1957 school year, classrooms in the west wing on the Ground Floor served as overflow space for fifth grade students from nearby Hillcrest Elementary School.

Prior to the school district merger between the Burlington City Schools and the Alamance County Schools (creating the Alamance–Burlington School System in 1996), Williams was one of two high schools in the former Burlington City Schools district, along with Hugh Cummings High School, which was constructed in the early 1970s to accommodate the expanded student population at Williams. Prior to integration, Williams was historically white, while Jordan Sellars High School across town was historically black. The period surrounding integregation at Williams is documented in the book Black Coach.

Elvis Presley performed at Williams on February 15, 1956, at 8:00pm. Other performers scheduled for the two-hour performance included Justin Tubb (son of Ernest Tubb), Benny Martin, and "Mother Maybelle" Carter with June Carter (later June Carter Cash). Though little more is known about the concert itself, it is known that he stopped at Brightwood Restaurant on Highway 70 en route to Greensboro after the concert, where he ordered a burger and a glass of milk. The booth where he sat has been preserved with a portrait overhead. The waitress who served him that night still works there. Buddy Rich also performed at the school in the 1950s. Poet and novelist Flannery O'Connor has also appeared at Williams, along with author Timothy Tyson, who wrote Blood Done Sign My Name, 2005 summer reading selection at the University of North Carolina at Chapel Hill and the inspiration of a movie by the same title released in the 1980s. William C. Friday, president of the University of North Carolina from 1956 to 1985, was the featured speaker at an awards assembly in the 1980s. Nobel Peace Prize winner Elie Wiesel has also spoken at the school. Judge Henry Frye, the first African-American chief justice of the North Carolina Supreme Court also spoke at the school, as has Lonice Bias, mother of University of Maryland basketball player Len Bias.

Prior to the completion of the "Tobacco Road" stretch of Interstate 85 through Alamance County in 1960, US Route 70 (which runs concurrent with Church Street) was a major east-west route, placing the school on a major thoroughfare, which most likely led to the academic landmark becoming familiar to east-west travelers.

In the fall of 1960, ninth grade students began attending what was then the newly opened Turrentine Junior High School. Ninth graders did not attend Williams again until after the former Jordan Sellars campus was no longer used as a ninth grade center. Following a 1971 desegregation order which sought to eliminate racial segregation at Sellars Gunn, ninth grade students were sent to Sellars Gunn. Eventually, the Jordan Sellars campus transitioned into a campus to house alternative educational programs in 1995, and both Williams and the Hugh M. Cummings campus returned to a four-year format in 1982.

Like many cities in the south, Burlington experienced tension during the period of integration in the late 1960s and early 1970s. Prior to the appointment of Jerome Evans as head coach, a sit-in was held on the front lawn to communicate concerns about a lack of diversity on the cheerleading squad. Following the sit-in, a march to the school district office was held. This period in history was explored in Daniel Koehler's documentary Burlington: A City Divided, which was featured at the Reynolda Film Festival at Wake Forest University in the spring of 2010, at which director Spike Lee, known for his films on themes of social justice, was the featured guest speaker.

The 1975–1976 school year marked the national bicentennial, the 25th anniversary of the opening of Williams, and the 50th anniversary of the school's yearbook, the Doe-Wah-Jack; this had been the name of the yearbook at the former Burlington High School. According to Gillespie, yearbook staff members who saw the word on a local stove learned that it is an American Indian word meaning "the first, the best". This was submitted to students and was chosen as the name of the yearbook.

In 1986, a fire in a chemistry lab caused several thousand dollars' worth in damage. Three football coaches took turns crawling along the floor to put the fire out.

== Predecessor schools ==
The original Burlington High School was located on Broad Street, and served students until 1951. It is from this school that the names of the yearbook and student newspaper are carried on.

In 1971, the Burlington City Schools were placed under a court order to integrate, leading to ongoing federal court supervision of the school system's operations (as well as those of the subsequent Alamance Burlington School System).

Jordan Sellars High School, a historically black institution, closed its doors in 1970, at which time all of its students were integrated into the student body at Williams and the newly opened Hugh M Cummings High School.

The 1971 order sought to eliminate racial segregation at was Jordan Sellars, which the federal court determined was being operated as a racially identifiable school in violation of the Fourteenth Amendment. Pursuant to the order, the former Burlington City District attempted to end segregation at what was now Sellars-Gunn by converting it into a junior high school for all Burlington ninth grade students, regardless of race. Sellars-Gunn remained a ninth-grade school from 1971 until 1982, when it was closed and its students were moved to the two high schools – Cummings High and Williams High (Caron Myers press release, July 20, 2009).

In 1995, Sellars-Gunn re-opened as an alternative education center. It houses several of the school system's alternative education programs, including a Career-Technical Education program and a voluntary program for students suspended for more than 10 days from other Alamance-Burlington schools (Caron Myers press release, July 20, 2009).

== Feeder schools ==
Most ninth graders previously attended nearby Turrentine Middle School, constructed in the early 1960s. The four elementary schools that ultimately feed into Williams are Smith, Grove Park, Highland, and Hillcrest.

In addition, some students from Blessed Sacrament School choose to attend Williams upon reaching ninth grade.

== Facilities ==
One of the most historically architecturally unique high school buildings still in use in North Carolina, it is three stories tall, centered around an interior courtyard area now used for parking. Unique in architectural style, it is reminiscent of the classic industrial-like high school architecture representative of the 1950s. The main academic building consists of three wings: the Main Wing, the East Wing, and the West Wing. From above, the building looks like a dogbone.

The main wing includes the cafeteria, the historic academic hall, and classrooms. The east wing includes office facilities, the media center, classrooms, and the Academy of Finance. The west wing includes science and home economics classrooms.

The cafeteria (lunchroom) is furnished like a 1950s diner. When the school was originally constructed, the cafeteria's service area contained separate restrooms for "white and colored help", thus accounting for two sets of men's and women's restrooms being located virtually side by side. After a renovation in the summer of 2009, the cafeteria was outfitted with four HDTV televisions that display menus.

Just off the south hall of the second floor of the West Wing is what was initially designed as the Home Economics Suite, designed to provide a "homelike" area for home economics (family and consumer sciences) instruction, and includes a replicated living room area (now used as a faculty workroom/conference room), complete with fireplace, along with a replicated bedroom (which now serves as an assistant principal's office) and dining room, which now serves as a faculty office. This area adjoins the room in which food service classes are taught. The door leading into the area resembles that of a front door to a home.

The auditorium is one of the largest auditoriums in North Carolina, with more seats than auditoriums at many major universities (UNCG's Aycock Auditorium was originally built to seat only a hundred or so than the Williams auditorium seats). The "auditorium seats over 2100 and includes a balcony that makes it reminiscent of a traditional downtown theatre. Because it is the largest facility of its kind in Alamance County, the auditorium is used for many outside performances and graduations, as well as Williams's school functions" ("Williams High Auditorium" greeting card, back side). At the time of construction, it was said to be second only to Raleigh's Memorial Auditorium in terms of seating capacity. includes a pipe organ donated by the Williamses, a rarity among even older high schools, which is generally used only during commencement exercises. Its dedicatory concert was performed by world-renowned concert organist Virgil Fox on October 19, 1951. The Burlington newspaper billed the organ as one of "the largest organ installations in the South." French organist Pierre Cochereau has performed there as well. The auditorium was the first part of the facility to be completed, and was used for the Burlington High School Class of 1951's commencement ceremony before the completion of the rest of the building. Thrice in the 1950s, the Miss North Carolina Pageant was held here.

During the early years of the school, there was a designated student "smoking room" where students, with parental permission, were allowed to go smoke after lunch. Students were required to show a red card to the faculty members (later student government officers) that supervised the room.

A street known as "Bulldog Alley" intersects the campus, with the main school building on the east side of the street, with major athletic facilities on the west side of the street.

The third part of the main building to be constructed is the Spikes Gymnasium. The gymnasium was named in honor of Dr. Lewis Everett Spikes on June 13, 1993. Dr. Spikes served as Superintendent of the Burlington City Schools from 1936 to 1963.

Athletic facilities include the Tommy Spoon Memorial Field House (named in memory of a star member of the football team and former athletic director who died in the late 1990s), the Kernodle football field, and the 10,000 seat Burlington City Schools stadium.

The campus is also known for its vast front lawn that faces South Church Street. The area, which is protected from development by city ordinance, hosts youth soccer events and is a seating area for community fireworks displays.

Renovations begun during the summer of 2008 on the Second Floor have vastly improved the library facilities, as well as lighting. Renovations are expected to continue on the remainder of the main building over the next several summers.

== Athletics ==
Williams Bulldogs
- School: Walter M. Williams High School
- Nickname: Bulldogs
- NCHSAA: 5A
- Conference: Mid-Carolina 4A/5A/6A
- Location: Burlington, North Carolina
- Varsity teams: 17 varsity teams
- Football stadium: Kernodle Field at Burlington Memorial Stadium
- Basketball arena: Spikes Gymnasium
- Colors: Black and Gold
- Fight song: Onward Bulldogs Rival: Western Alamance High School & Cummings High School
- Website: Walter M. Williams High School – Athletics Home

=== Overview ===
The school's athletic program consists of the following sports: tennis, cross-country, football, basketball, soccer, swimming, golf, track & field, wrestling, baseball, softball, and lacrosse.

The lacrosse program was started by a group of Williams's parents, and the first lacrosse coach was Stephen Bailey, who is also the head coach of the Elon University men's lacrosse team. The current varsity lacrosse coach is Hugh Fiery.

For many years, the athletic facilities were used by sports teams from Elon University.

=== Football program ===
The career of football coach Jerome Evans, who served from 1970 to 1976, is documented in the book Black Coach by Pat Jordan (published by Dodd Mead of New York in 1971), which also documents related racial tensions in the community at that time. A graduate of North Carolina Central University, Evans was appointed as head coach in the fall of 1970 during the period of integration. He was briefly alluded to in the film Remember the Titans (which tells the story of a football team at another Williams High School, located in Virginia).

The 1980 football team won the state championship, the first for Williams. A second state championship was won in 1981. The Bulldog teams during both these championship seasons had a record of 14–0, a record that has not been matched at the school.

== Leadership ==
The first principal, Calvin C. Linnemann, served from 1951 to 1957. He had served as principal of Burlington High School, and was a published author in the NASSP Journal.

The second principal of Williams, Lester R. Ridenhour (1915–1985) served from 1957 to 1960. He had served as principal of Broad Street School (the former campus of Burlington High School), and prior to that as assistant principal of Williams. In 1983, he received the Outstanding Alumni Award from East Carolina University, where he had completed degrees in 1939 and 1949. While at East Carolina, he played baseball, football, basketball, and tennis. He was inducted into the East Carolina University Sports Hall of Fame in 1979. The Lester R. Ridenhour Memorial Scholarship is presented to residents of Alamance County who attend East Carolina University.

lThe fourth principal of Williams, Jesse Weldon Harrington, who came to Williams from New Hanover High School in Wilmington, North Carolina was the longest serving principal, serving from 1962 through 1978. Born and raise in Moncure in adjacent Chatham County, he earned his bachelor's degree in business administration from what is now Elon University. He was serving as principal during the period covered in the book Black Coach in which author Pat Jordan described him as exhibiting a "busy but relaxed exterior" (Jordan, Black Coach, p. 136). He is the only former principal at the school to have a scholarship exclusively for Williams High seniors named in his honor. Mr. Harrington now lives in the Wilmington area.

The school had three principals in the 1980s. Marsh Lyall served as the fifth principal from 1979 to 1983. Lyall departed to assume the superintendency of the Wilkes County Schools.

Clinton E. Leggett served as the sixth principal from 1983 to 1986.

After serving as principal, the seventh principal of Williams, Harold Brewer (1986–1992) later served as Superintendent of Montgomery County Schools (from 1996–2001).

These were followed by the eighth principal, James Daye (1992–1994), who had served as principal of Watauga High School in Boone, and had served at the North Carolina Department of Public Instruction, and the ninth principal, Donald Andrews (1994–1996). Andrews later served as superintendent of the Harnett County Schools, and since 2005 has served as Superintendent of the Randolph County Schools, southwest of Burlington.

Phillip Deadmon served as the tenth principal from 1996 to 2001. Upon his retirement, Jack Butler served as interim principal in 2001.

Gary Thornburg, who in June 2010 retired from the principalship of Cedar Ridge High School, served as principal from 2001 to 2005. Mr. Thornburg was recognized as the 2005 Regional Wachovia Principal of the Year. It was during Thornburg's administration that the Academy of Finance was established.

Dr. George W. Griffin, formerly of Apex High School and North Carolina Central University served from 2005 to 2007.

Nola Taylor, the school's first female principal, was appointed in 2007, and served until 2011. Ms. Taylor, a graduate of Indiana University and the University of North Carolina at Greensboro came from principalships in Guilford County Schools. She now serves with the North Carolina Department of Public Instruction.

Dr. Joe Ferrell was named as Ms. Taylor's successor in July 2011. At the time of his appointment, he had served as principal at Eastern Guilford Middle School since 2004, and had served as principal at Hunter Elementary School in Greensboro. In Person County, he taught at the elementary and middle school levels, and served as an assistant principal at Northern Middle School in Roxboro. Ferrell holds degrees from Elon University, North Carolina State University, and the University of North Carolina at Greensboro.

Here are listed the principals in chronological order:

- Calvin C. Linnemann (1951–1957, six years)
- Lester R. Riderhour (1957–1960, three years)
- C. C. Cleetwood (1960–1962, two years)
- Jesse W. Harrington (1962–1978, sixteen years)
- Marsh Lyall (1979–1983, four years)
- Clinton E. Leggett (1983–1986, three years)
- Harold Brewer (1986–1992, six years)
- James Daye (1992–1994, two years)
- Donald Andrews (1994–1996, two years)
- Phillip Deadmon (1996–2001, five years)
- Jack Butler (2001, interim)
- Gary Thornburg (2001–2005, four years)
- George Griffin (2005–2007, two years)
- Nola Taylor (2007–2011, four years)
- Dr. Joe Ferrell (2011–2016, five years)
- Stephanie Hunt (2016–2021, five years)
- Curry E. Bryan, IV (2023–present)

== Notable people ==
=== Alumni ===
- Billy Bryan, former NFL center for the Denver Broncos, All-American football player at Duke University
- Ashton Clemmons, politician, member of the North Carolina House of Representatives
- Tommy Cole, All-American basketball player for Elon College, now Elon University
- Geoff Crompton, former NBA player
- Jim Donnan, former college football head coach
- Jim Long, served in the North Carolina House of Representatives and as North Carolina Commissioner of Insurance (1986–2008)
- Danny Morrison, sports executive, President of the Carolina Panthers
- Stephen M. Ross, member of the North Carolina House of Representatives
- Skip Seagraves, former Canadian Football League offensive lineman
- Brandon Spoon, former NFL linebacker, played college football at the University of North Carolina at Chapel Hill
- Floyd Wicker, former MLB player

=== Faculty ===
- Jerome Evans, former head football coach and former assistant principal, subject of the book Black Coach published by Dodd & Mead of New York. The Jerome Evans Memorial Scholarship is named in his memory.
