= Wyatt Outlaw =

African American who was lynched in the U.S.

Wyatt Outlaw (c. 1820 – February 26, 1870) was an American politician and the first African-American to serve as Town Commissioner and Constable of the town of Graham, North Carolina. He was lynched by the White Brotherhood, a branch of the Ku Klux Klan on February 26, 1870. His death, along with the assassination of white Republican State Senator John W. Stephens at the Caswell County Courthouse, provoked Governor William Woods Holden to declare martial law in Alamance and Caswell Counties, resulting in the Kirk-Holden War of 1870.

== Biography ==
Wyatt Outlaw was born around 1820. His mother was a black woman, Jemima Phillips. Her status as free or enslaved is unknown, though there is no record of her being enslaved and she shared her surname with a proximate free black family in Caswell County. Wyatt's name is also sometimes written as "White". He was apparently of mixed racial heritage, with the 1870 U.S. census describing him as mulatto. He was mentioned in a letter from a local railroad worker as being the son of a white Alamance County politician Chesley F. Faucett, though the veracity of this assertion is unknown. What manner of relationship between Phillips and Faucett may have occurred or any details of the circumstances of Outlaw's conception are unknown. Historian Carole W. Troxler wrote that Outlaw was most likely literate, though he preferred to use "X" when marking his signature later in life.

One source suggests he lived on the tobacco farm of Nancy Outlaw on Jordan Creek, northeast of Graham, North Carolina. Sources conflict on the question of whether Outlaw was born a slave or a free person of color. Historian Scott Reynolds Nelson argued that Wyatt was born free, and that this status explains his lack of appearance in local records for the early period of his life. Phillips later testified that county officials made no note of Wyatt's birth, ancestry, or his marriage. He did not use the surname "Outlaw" until later in his life. Troxler's and Nelson's work suggests that, regardless of his status at birth, Outlaw was free by the time of the American Civil War.

According to work by Troxler and Nelson, Outlaw is probably the same person listed as "Wright Outlaw" at the rank of private in the roster of the 2nd Regiment U. S. Colored Cavalry. The unit was organized in 1863 in Virginia and was later stationed on the Rio Grande in Texas until mustered out in February 1866. Troxler and several other Alamance historians later changed their view following the discovery of a muster card, asserting that Wright Outlaw was actually a different person.

Wyatt Outlaw was recorded as present in Alamance County by April 1866. He served as a marriage bondsman for at least six men, some of them U. S. Colored Troops veterans, over the following year. Leasing a property from former local Red Strings leader and Republican clerk of court William Albright, he opened a woodshop on Main Street in Graham, where he built coffins and repaired wagons. He also sold liquor from his shop, leading it to sometimes operate as a barroom. Local courts attempted to shut it down, as Outlaw had no license to operate a bar, but without apparent success.

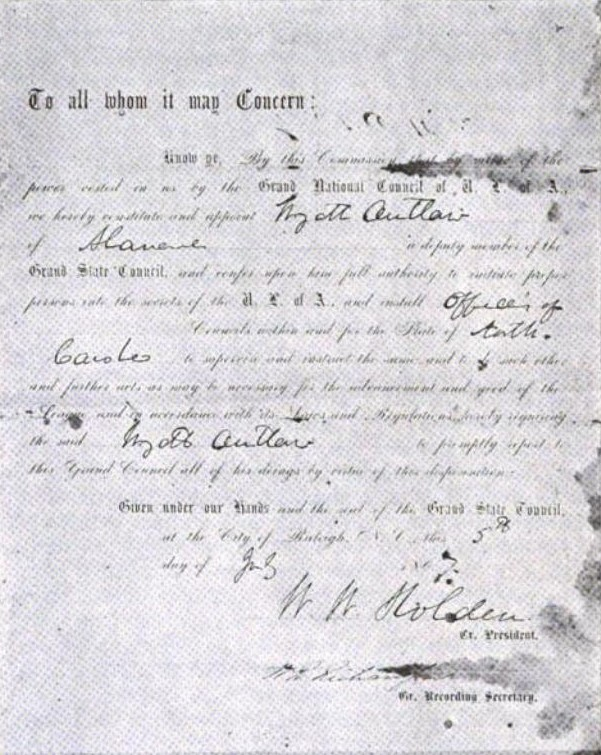
Outlaw's commission into the Union League, dated July 5, 1867 and signed by William Woods Holden

In October 1866, a convention of the North Carolina Equal Rights League of Freedmen was held in Raleigh. Outlaw was dispatched as one of two delegates from Alamance County. The assembly elected Outlaw as one of five members of its state board. and passed a resolution urging delegates to "return home, to form, or cause to be formed, an Equal Rights League." Upon returning to Alamance County, Outlaw created a biracial chapter of the Loyal League, which at its onset focused on building a church and school in Graham. (Note: Troxler notes, "Outlaw organized or led organizations known in Alamance County as Equal Rights League, Loyal League, Loyal Republican League, and Union League.") In September 1868, Outlaw was among four trustees who were deeded land for the establishment of the first black church in Alamance County, later an African Methodist Episcopal congregation.

William Woods Holden, a leading Republican in the state, began arranging the Union League as a statewide organization in 1867 in preparation for his bid for gubernatorial office. On July 5, he commissioned Outlaw as a deputy member of the league. Alongside local party activist Albright, Outlaw became one of the chief promoters of the Republican cause in Alamance County. Holden was elected governor in 1868 and assumed office while the state was undergoing a constitutional transition. Empowered by the new constitution to appoint new public officials across the state until elections could be organized, Holden became responsible for selection Graham's town commission. He appointed Outlaw as town commissioner in July, representing the Faucette's Store constituency. Outlaw later won reelection to the office.

White supporters of the Conservative Party opposed to Republican government and black involvement in public affairs in Alamance County organized an armed group known as the White Brotherhood. It demonstrated in Graham in February 1869 and fired upon public officials. In response, the town commission created a patrol and enforced a curfew. Outlaw became one of five armed constables of the town. On one occasion in 1869, white residents of the area who were incensed by the prospect of being policed by an all African-American constabulary organized a nighttime ride in Klan garb through the streets of Graham in an effort to frighten the African-American constables. Outlaw and another constable opened fire on the night riders, but no injuries were sustained. (Note: Historian Otto H. Olsen writes of this alleged skirmish that was reported in the Conservative press that it "was not believed in Alamance, even by the leader of the Klan in the very town where Outlaw was hanged.")

== Death ==
=== Lynching ===
Outlaw's aggressive response to the night riders may have inflamed the anger of Klan sympathizers. The night of February 26, 1870, a party of unidentified men rode into Graham, dragged Outlaw from his home and hanged him from an elm tree in the courthouse square in Graham, in what is now known as Sesquicentennial Park, located at 36°04′11.3″N 79°24′02.3″W. Outlaw's body bore on the chest a message from the perpetrators: "Beware, ye guilty, both black and white." The following morning, his body was brought into the courthouse where it lay upon a table or bench for the rest of the day.

The same night as the lynching, Klansmen visited the Alamance home of black Republican Henry Holt. Holt was not there, but the Klansmen told his wife that he should leave the area or face the same fate as Outlaw. Holt promptly fled the county. Less than two weeks later another black man, William Puryear, was found dead in a millpond tied down to a rock. Puryear, who was mentally disabled, had claimed to have followed two of Outlaw's killers to their homes and identified them.

=== Political reaction ===
According to Nelson, Outlaw's lynching was intended to provoke the state Republican Party. Some Conservatives newspapers alleged that the Outlaw murder was a Republican fabrication, while others argued that he was killed by local blacks due to alleged adultery and theft of Union League funds. Others cited the tale of him trading gunfire with the Klan.

On March 7, Holden issued a proclamation of a state of insurrection in Alamance County.

=== Criminal investigations ===
In late 1871, while holding Superior Court trials in Graham, Judge Albion W. Tourgée exploited a dispute between two local Klansmen which revealed information concerning the murder of Outlaw. In the latter part of 1872, Tourgée issued indictments against 14 to 18 men for the murder of Outlaw. In 1873, the Grand Jury of Alamance County brought felony indictments against 63 Klansmen, including 18 murder counts, in connection with the lynching of Outlaw. Two of those arrested in connection to the case confessed to involvement. Other accused men fled the jurisdiction. That year, the General Assembly passed the Amnesty Act, which exonerated persons found responsible for political violence in the preceding years; the Conservative-backed measure was designed to protect members of the Klan. Additionally, the legislature repealed the statute under which most of the indictments had been brought. The granting of amnesty ended Tourgée's efforts. No one was ever tried in connection with Outlaw's murder.

== Legacy and commemoration ==
Troxler wrote that Outlaw "loomed beyond the perception of heroes and villain's as a tragic victim, the briefly assertive Negro among Reconstruction's other anomalies, even a forgotten man." Outlaw's original Union League commission is preserved in the Southern Historical Collection at the University of North Carolina at Chapel Hill. One of Tourgée's novels, A Fool's Errand, describes the murder of a character, Uncle Jerry, with details informed by the killing of Outlaw. Troxler argued that the characters of Nimbus and Eliab in Tourgée's novel, Bricks and Straw, bear some resemblance to Outlaw. Nelson also believed that Nimbus was inspired by Outlaw. No photographs of Outlaw are known to exist. A photo of Caswell Holt, a contemporary of Outlaw, has often been misidentified as being a depiction of Outlaw.

== Works cited ==
- Alexander, Roberta Sue (1985). North Carolina Faces the Freedmen : Race Relations During Presidential Reconstruction 1865–67. Durham: Duke University Press. ISBN 0-8223-0628-X.
- Allen, Sylvester Jr.; Boggs, Belle (2026). The legend of Wyatt Outlaw: from Reconstruction through Black Lives Matter. Chapel Hill: The University of North Carolina Press. ISBN 978-1-4696-8999-9.
- Brisson, Jim D. (April 2011). "'Civil Government Was Crumbling Around Me': The Kirk-Holden War of 1870". The North Carolina Historical Review. 8 (2): 123–163. JSTOR 23523540.
- Dial, Adolph L.; Eliades, David K. (1996). The Only Land I Know: A History of the Lumbee Indians (1st Syracuse University Press ed.). Syracuse: Syracuse University Press. ISBN 9780815603603.
- Evans, William McKee (2015). To Die Game: The Story of the Lowry Band, Indian Guerillas of Reconstruction (reprint ed.). Syracuse: Syracuse University Press. ISBN 9780815603061.
- Nelson, Scott Reynolds (2004). "Red Strings and Half-Brothers: Civil Wars in Alamance County, North Carolina". In Inscoe, John C.; Kenzer, Robert C. (eds.). Enemies of the Country: New Perspectives on Unionists in the Civil War South (reprint ed.). Athens: University of Georgia Press. pp. 37–53. ISBN 9780820326603.
- Olsen, Otto H. (July 1962). "The Ku Klux Klan: A Study in Reconstruction Politics and Propaganda". The North Carolina Historical Review. 39 (3): 340–362. ISSN 0029-2494. JSTOR 23517289.
- Raper, Horace W. (1985). William W. Holden: North Carolina's Political Enigma. Chapel Hill: University of North Carolina Press. ISBN 0807850608.
- Troxler, Carole Watterson (October 2000). ""To look more closely at the man": Wyatt Outlaw, a Nexus of National, Local, and Personal History". The North Carolina Historical Review. 77 (4): 403–433. JSTOR 23522167.
