= Elon, North Carolina =

- Town
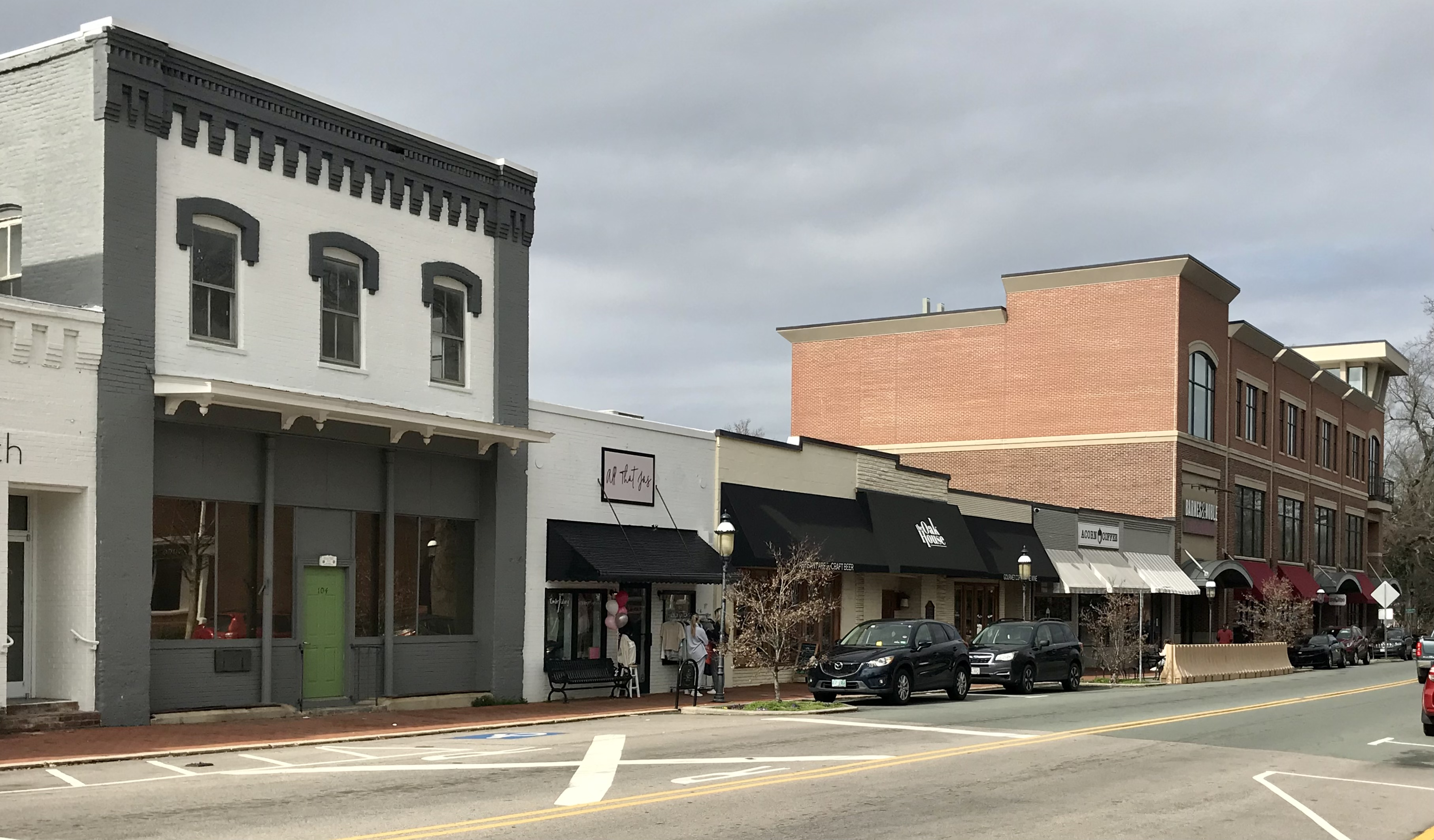
- North Williamson Avenue

- Flag Seal Logo
- Motto: "Deep Roots. New Horizons."
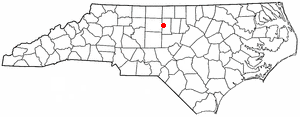
- Location of Elon, North Carolina
- Coordinates: 36°07′36″N 79°29′44″W
- Country: United States
- State: North Carolina
- County: Alamance
- Founded: 1881
- Incorporated: 1893
- Named for: Hebrew word for oak.

Government
  - Mayor: Emily Sharpe

Area
  - Total: 4.22 sq mi (10.94 km^{2})
  - Land: 4.17 sq mi (10.81 km^{2})
  - Water: 0.050 sq mi (0.13 km^{2})
- Elevation: 705 ft (215 m)

Population (2020)
  - Total: 11,336
  - Density: 2,717.0/sq mi (1,049.03/km^{2})
- Time zone: UTC-5 (Eastern (EST))
  - Summer (DST): UTC-4 (EDT)
- ZIP code: 27244
- FIPS code: 37-21095
- GNIS feature ID: 2406445
- Website: www.townofelon.com

Elon (/ˈiːlɔːn/) is a town in Alamance County, North Carolina, United States. It is part of the Burlington metropolitan statistical area. The population as of the 2020 census was 11,336. The town of Elon is home to Elon University.

== History ==
Elon began in 1881 as a North Carolina Railroad depot in between the stations of Goldsboro and Charlotte, called "Mill Point” because it was envisioned to be a shipping point for area cotton mills. Locals called it “Boone’s Crossing.” Because of a growing population, a post office was built, which established a more permanent residency in 1888.

In 1889, the local Christian Assembly created an institution of higher learning called the “Graham Normal College”. The founders of Elon College named the school “Elon”, because they understood that to be the Hebrew word for oak, and the area contained many oak trees. The town was called "Elon College" until the college known as Elon College became Elon University. The town then changed its name officially to Elon.

== Geography ==
According to the United States Census Bureau, the town has a total area of 3.9 square miles (10.2 km^{2}), of which 3.9 square miles (10.1 km^{2}) is land and 0.039 square miles (0.1 km^{2}), or 1.23%, is water.

== Demographics ==
Historical population
Census	Pop.	Note	%±
1900	638		—
1910	200		−68.7%
1920	425		112.5%
1930	373		−12.2%
1940	494		32.4%
1950	1,109		124.5%
1960	1,284		15.8%
1970	2,150		67.4%
1980	2,873		33.6%
1990	4,394		52.9%
2000	6,738		53.3%
2010	9,419		39.8%
2020	11,336		20.4%
2025 (est.)	11,366	▲	0.3%
U.S. Decennial Census

=== 2020 census ===
As of the 2020 census, Elon had a population of 11,336. The median age was 21.5 years. 9.5% of residents were under the age of 18 and 17.1% of residents were 65 years of age or older. For every 100 females there were 72.7 males, and for every 100 females age 18 and over there were 70.7 males age 18 and over.

98.5% of residents lived in urban areas, while 1.5% lived in rural areas.

There were 2,851 households in Elon, of which 23.7% had children under the age of 18 living in them. The census also counted 1,888 families in the town. Of all households, 45.8% were married-couple households, 18.1% were households with a male householder and no spouse or partner present, and 33.6% were households with a female householder and no spouse or partner present. About 28.5% of all households were made up of individuals and 17.9% had someone living alone who was 65 years of age or older.

There were 3,175 housing units, of which 10.2% were vacant. The homeowner vacancy rate was 2.5% and the rental vacancy rate was 9.5%.

Racial composition as of the 2020 census
Race	Number	Percent
White	9,257	81.7%
Black or African American	940	8.3%
American Indian and Alaska Native	20	0.2%
Asian	288	2.5%
Native Hawaiian and Other Pacific Islander	0	0.0%
Some other race	205	1.8%
Two or more races	626	5.5%
Hispanic or Latino (of any race)	592	5.2%

=== 2010 census ===
As of the census of 2010, there were 9,419 people, 2,794 households, and 1,357 families residing in the town. The population density was 2,415.1 inhabitants per square mile (932.5/km^{2}). There were 3,063 housing units at an average density of 785.4 per square mile (303.2/km^{2}). The racial makeup of the town was 86.7% White, 8.5% African American, 0.1% Native American, 2% Asian, 0.03% Pacific Islander, 1.1% from other races, and 1.6% from two or more races. Hispanic or Latino of any race were 2.6% of the population.

There were 2,794 households, out of which 18.1% had children under the age of 18 living with them, 41.2% were married couples living together, 5.2% had a female householder with no husband present, and 51.4% were non-families. 28.8% of all households were made up of individuals, and 19.4% had someone living alone who was 65 years of age or older. The average household size was 2.35 and the average family size was 2.84.

In the town, the population was spread out, with 30.1% under the age of 20, 30.7% from 20 to 24, 9.5% from 25 to 44, 13.2% from 45 to 64, and 16.4% who were 65 years of age or older. The median age was 21.8 years.

According to the 2020-2024 American Community Survey, the median income for a household in the town was $84,773, and the per capita income for the town was $28,605. About 20% of the population were below the poverty line.

== Education ==
Public schools in Elon are part of the Alamance-Burlington School System, which was created by a merger between the Alamance County School System and the Burlington City School System in 1996.

Local public schools in Elon include:

- Altamahaw-Ossipee Elementary School
- Elon Elementary
- Western Alamance Middle
- Western Alamance High

Elon University is also located in Elon, North Carolina.

== Transportation ==
Elon University provides a bus system known as the Biobus for use by both students of the university as well as the general public. Certain routes travel from the campus to destinations within the town of Elon as well as the surrounding area.
