= Sallie Walker Stockard =

American professor

Sallie Walker Stockard

Sallie Walker Stockard (October 4, 1869 – August 6, 1963) was a professor of history and an author. She was the first woman to receive a degree from the University of North Carolina.

She was born in Saxapahaw in Alamance County, North Carolina. She was the eldest of John Williamson Stockard and Margaret Ann Albright Stockard's six children. Her graduate thesis was a history of Alamance County. She graduated from Guilford College and University of North Carolina.

She married Perry Green Magness. They had a son and daughter. The couple separated and she generally used her maiden name.

Carole Watterson Troxler's book about Stockard was published in 2021.

== Writings ==
- History of Alamance County
- The Lily of the Valley, a five act dramatization of the Song of Solomon
- History of Guilford County (1902)
- The History of Lawrence, Jackson, Independence, and Stone Counties of the Third Judicial District of Arkansas (1904)
- Daughter of the Piedmont: Chapel Hill’s First Co-Ed Graduate, unpublished
