= Jeanne Robertson =

American comedian (1943–2021)

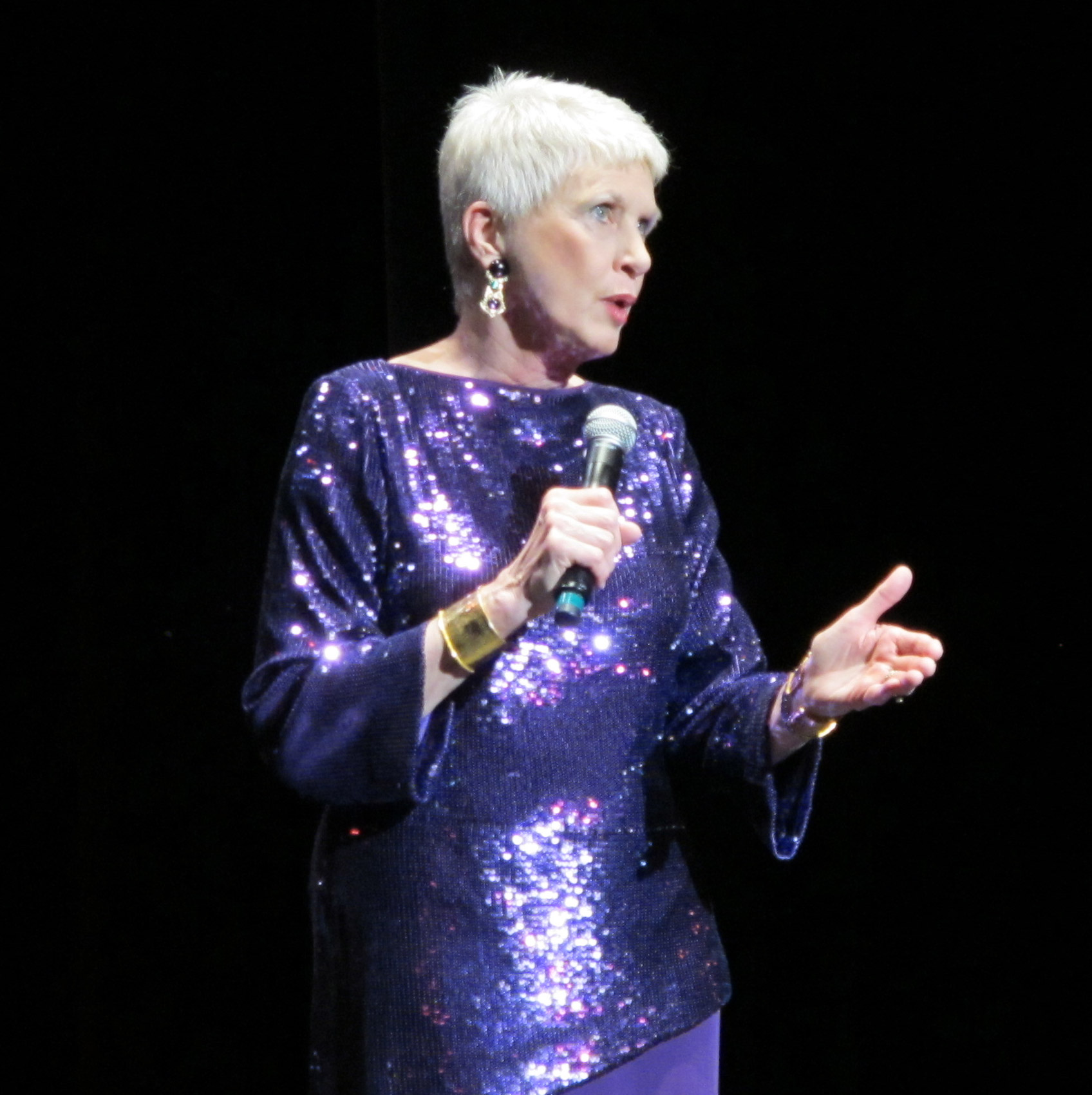
- Performing onstage in Charlottesville, Virginia, April 2012
- Born: Jeanne Flinn Swanner; September 21, 1943; Chelsea, Massachusetts, U.S.
- Died: August 21, 2021 (aged 77); Burlington, North Carolina, U.S.
- Education: Auburn University
- Occupations: Humorist; speaker; author
- Years active: 1963–2021
- Height: 6 ft 2 in (1.88 m)
- Spouses: Walter Bowline (m. 1965, div. early 1970s) Jerry Robertson (m. 1974; died 2021)
- Children: 1
- Beauty pageant titleholder
- Title: Miss North Carolina 1963
- Hair color: White (formerly blond)
- Major competition: Miss America 1964
- Website: jeannerobertson.com

Jeanne Flinn Swanner Robertson (/ˈdʒiːni/ JEE-nee; September 21, 1943 – August 21, 2021) was an American comedian, public speaker, and beauty pageant winner who was crowned Miss North Carolina 1963.

== Early life ==
Jeanne Flinn Swanner was born at the Naval Hospital Boston in Chelsea, Massachusetts and raised in Graham, North Carolina, one of three daughters. According to one of her YouTube videoclips, not only was she taller than sisters Katherine and Andrea, she was also especially tall as a youth, growing to 6 ft 2 in (1.88 m) by age 13. She was an avid basketball player.

== Pageant participant ==
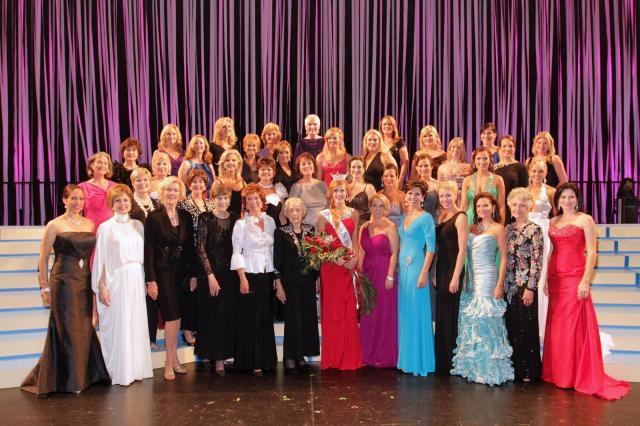
Former Miss North Carolinas gathered at the Pageant's 75th Anniversary. Robertson is in the center of the back row.

In 1963, at age 19, she was named Miss North Carolina and went on to be named Miss Congeniality in that year's Miss America competition. As of 2021, Jeanne Swanner, at 6 foot 2 inches, is still the tallest contestant ever to participate in the Miss America pageant. Robertson credited her reign as the catalyst for her career.

Following her Miss North Carolina reign, Robertson used her scholarship to fund her college education at Auburn University, where she majored in physical education, joined Alpha Gamma Delta, and played college basketball. Robertson graduated in 1967, and in 1990 she was inducted as an alumni member of the Omicron Delta Kappa Circle at Auburn University.

== Career ==
Robertson taught physical education for eight years in North Carolina.

Although she began her public speaking career with her pageant title, Robertson achieved much more national attention as a humorist and speaker. Her anecdotes have been broadcast regularly on satellite radio comedy channels, including XM Radio's Laugh USA, Sirius Radio's Blue Collar Comedy and its Family Comedy Channel, and Laugh Break. Her popularity soared, however, in 2009 after a handful of humorous clips from her talks became popular videos. Robertson distinguished between a humorist, which she considered herself, and a comedian, stating, "The humorist weaves the longer stories with a point. We don't go 'after' anybody. I'm telling my life."

In 1980 she was designated a Certified Speaking Professional by the National Speakers Association, and served as the association's president in 1985. She was also a Golden Gavel award-winning Toastmaster.

On April 29, 2008, she spoke at the White House for National Volunteer Week to honor the 1,300 volunteers who donate time to work at the White House.

== Honors and awards ==
- National Speakers Association Speaker Hall of Fame (inducted in 1981)
- National Speakers Association Cavett Award (1989); first woman to receive the award
- Omicron Delta Kappa (inducted in 1990 as an alumna at Auburn University)
- Toastmasters International Golden Gavel Award (1998)
- North Carolina Press Association North Carolinian of the Year (2001)

Graham Historical Museum, in her hometown of Graham, North Carolina, features a permanent exhibit, Jeanne Swanner Robertson.

== Personal life ==
Jeanne married Walter Bowline III in 1965; they had one son and divorced in the early 1970s. In 1974, she married Jerry Robertson, a graduate of Duke University where, at 6 ft 6 in (1.98 m) tall and on an athletic scholarship, he played on its basketball team, serving as its captain in 1959. Jerry received his master's degree and doctorate at the University of North Carolina; he was an educator and principal, eventually serving as superintendent of Burlington City Schools, and later working in business. In her performances, Jeanne would frequently refer to him as "Left Brain", or sometimes "LB". They were married until his death in June 2021.

Robertson's son, Walter Bailey "Beaver" Bowline, is a 1989 graduate of Elon University, where Jeanne was a trustee. Two of Jeanne's grandchildren also attended Elon. Jeanne and Jerry Robertson were both members of Elon University's Phoenix Club, which supports the athletic program, and the university's track and field complex is named after the couple.

Robertson was a member of the Methodist church. She said her favorite television series was The Andy Griffith Show. Her 1995 book, Mayberry Humor Across the USA, furthers her connection to Griffith's show.

=== Death ===
On August 12, 2021, it was announced that some of Robertson's future engagements had been canceled due to a "serious but non-COVID-related" illness. She unexpectedly died at her home in Burlington, North Carolina on August 21, 2021, at age 77.

== Books ==
Robertson authored four books:

- Humor: The Magic of Genie: Seven Potions for Developing a Sense of Humor (1989) Rich Publishing Company, ISBN 9780960725694
- Mayberry Humor Across the USA (1995) Rich Publishing Company, ISBN 9780927577021
- Don't Let the Funny Stuff Get Away (1998) Rich Publishing Company, ISBN 9780927577038
- Don't Bungee Jump Naked And Other Important Stuff (2020) Jeanne Robertson, ISBN 9780578668611

== Audio and video media ==
Robertson's performances have been recorded on both DVD and CD, with nine titles currently available:

- Rocking Humor
- Fabulously Funny
- Looking for Humor
- Just for Fun
- Flat Out Funny
- Southern Style
- Talkin' Funny
- Not Just for Laughs
- Here She Is

Many short segments of her speeches (individual stories, outtakes, etc.) are also available on Jeanne's YouTube channel, as well as recordings of her 2020–2021 livestream series "Live from the Back Porch".
