= North Main Street Historic District (Graham, North Carolina) =

Historic district in North Carolina, United States

- U.S. National Register of Historic Places
- U.S. Historic district
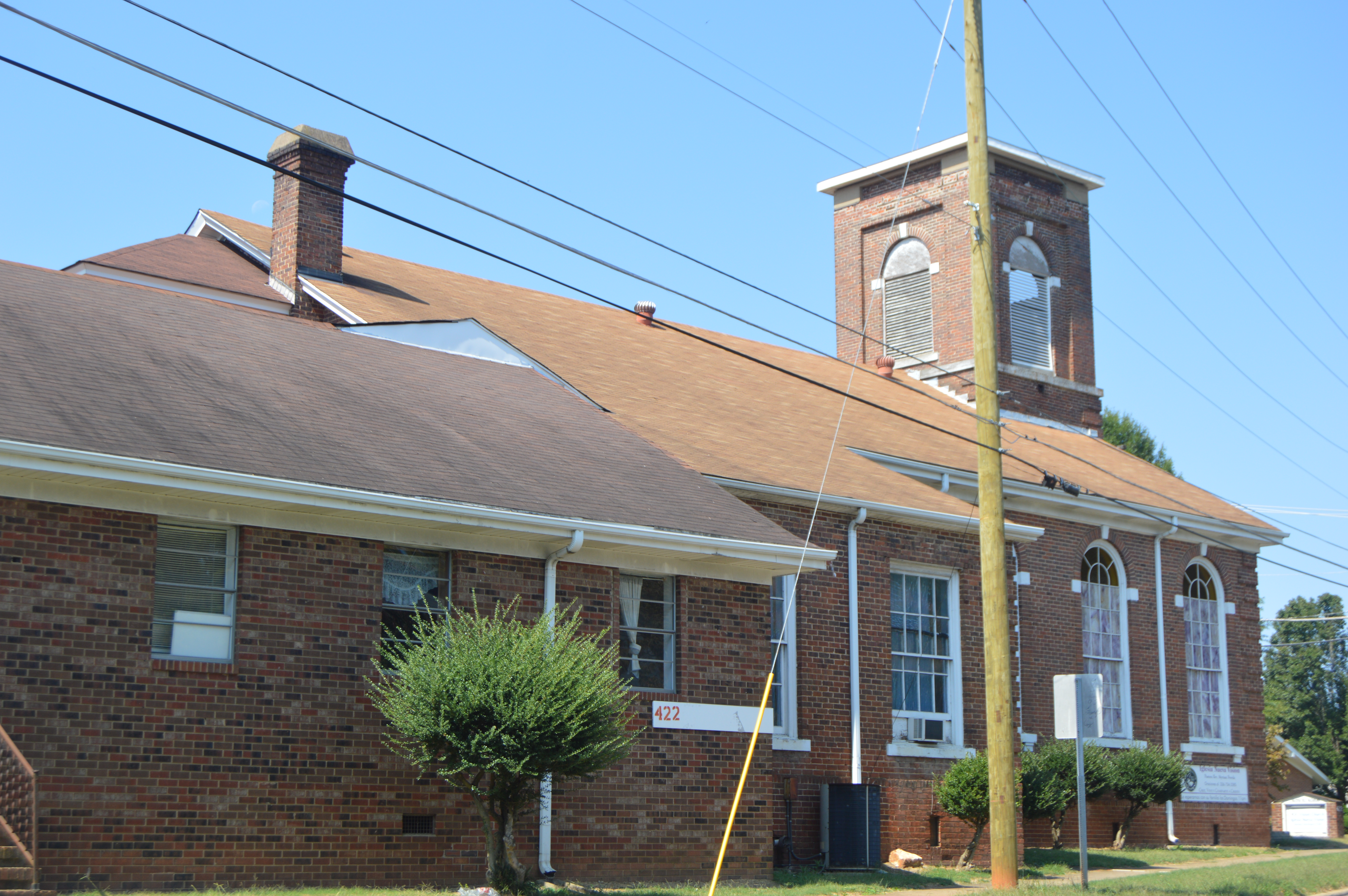
- New Vision Church of the Nazarene

- Location within North Carolina Location within the United States
- Location: Roughly bounded by Whitsett, New Hill, N. Melville, Market, Mill and Sideview Sts., Graham, North Carolina
- Coordinates: 36°04′30″N 79°23′57″W
- Area: 24 acres (9.7 ha)
- Built: 1851
- Architectural style: Italianate, Queen Anne
- NRHP reference No.: 99000698
- Added to NRHP: June 10, 1999

North Main Street Historic District is a national historic district located at Graham, Alamance County, North Carolina. It encompasses 101 contributing buildings date from the 1850s to 1949 in a predominantly residential section of Graham. The district contains single and multi-family dwellings, two schools, one commercial building and three churches.

It was added to the National Register of Historic Places in 1999.
