= Geoff Crompton =

American basketball player

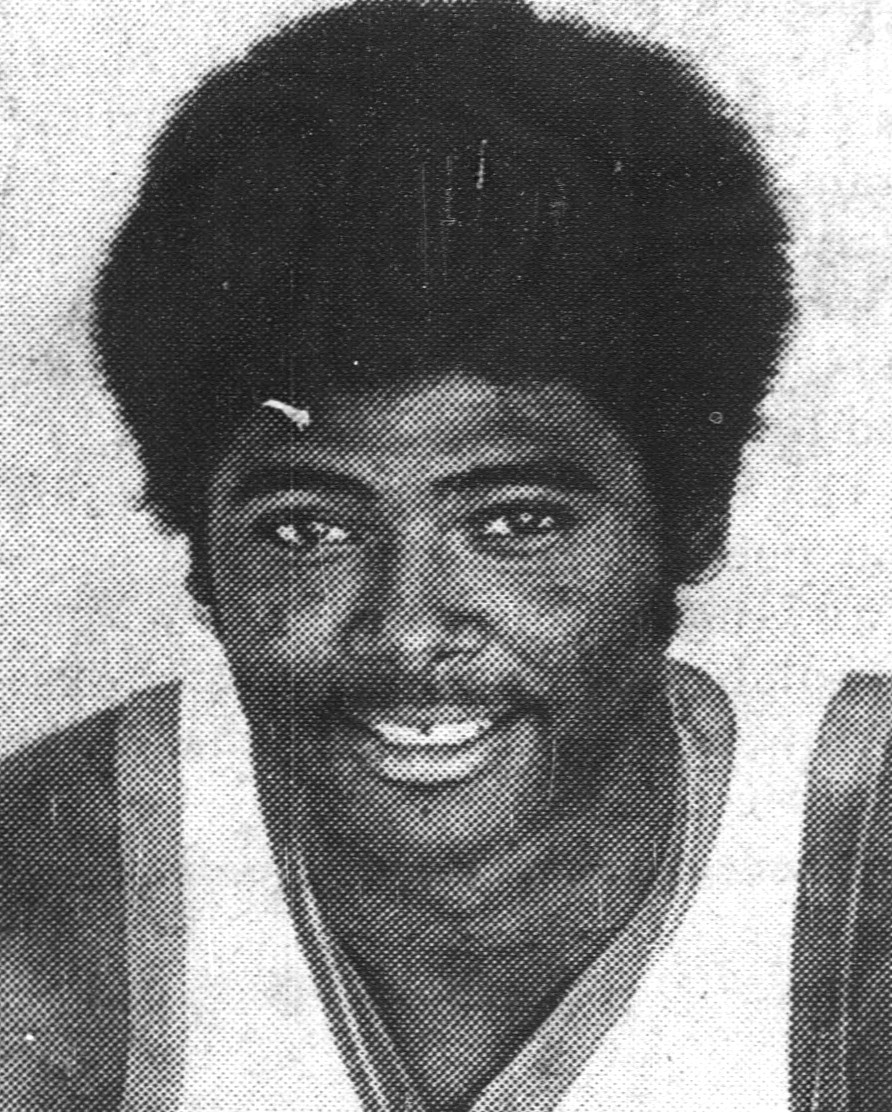
- Crompton, circa 1976

Personal information
- Born: July 4, 1955 Burlington, North Carolina, U.S.
- Died: January 7, 2002 (aged 46) Tallahassee, Florida, U.S.
- Listed height: 6 ft 11 in (2.11 m)
- Listed weight: 285 lb (129 kg)

Career information
- High school: Walter M. Williams (Burlington, North Carolina)
- College: North Carolina (1973–1978)
- NBA draft: 1978: 4th round, 70th overall pick
- Drafted by: Kansas City Kings
- Playing career: 1978–1984
- Position: Center
- Number: 22, 45, 54, 50, 41

Career history
- 1978–1979: Denver Nuggets
- 1979–1980: Montana Golden Nuggets
- 1980–1981: Portland Trail Blazers
- 1981–1982: Milwaukee Bucks
- 1982–1983: Montana Golden Nuggets
- 1983: San Antonio Spurs
- 1983–1984: Puerto Rico Coquis
- 1983–1984: Cleveland Cavaliers

Career highlights
- CBA Most Valuable Player (1984); All-CBA First Team (1984); All-CBA Second Team (1983); CBA All-Defensive Second Team (1984); CBA rebounding leader (1985); Second-team Parade All-American (1973)

Career NBA statistics
- Points: 99 (1.2 ppg)
- Rebounds: 139 (1.7 rpg)
- Assists: 28 (0.3 apg)
- Stats at NBA.com
- Stats at Basketball Reference

Jeffrey Crompton, often stylized as "Geoff" or "Geff" (July 4, 1955 – January 7, 2002), was an American professional basketball player.

A 6'11 Parade All-American center from Walter M. Williams High School in Burlington, North Carolina, Crompton attended the University of North Carolina to play for future Hall of Fame coach Dean Smith in 1973. Crompton played very sparingly for the Tar Heels, appearing in a total of nine games from 1973 to 1977 due to academic and weight issues. He played 27 games as a senior in 1977–78, averaging 3.5 points and 3.3 rebounds per game.

Following his collegiate career, Crompton was drafted in the fourth round of the 1978 NBA draft by the Kansas City Kings, and his rights were traded to the Denver Nuggets prior to the start of the season. The next several years saw Crompton bouncing between the NBA and the Continental Basketball Association (CBA). He was selected as the CBA Most Valuable Player and named to the All-CBA First Team in 1984, All-CBA Second Team in 1983 and All-Defensive Second Team in 1984. The Cleveland Cavaliers called him up at the end of that season, which would be his last in the NBA.

After his professional career ended, Crompton moved to Tallahassee, Florida, and managed a restaurant. He worked for many years at UNC's summer basketball camps up until his death. Geoff Crompton died on January 7, 2002, of leukemia.

Crompton's first name is generally spelled "Geff" in UNC records, but is often spelled "Geoff" in records of his NBA career.

== Career statistics ==
Legend
GP	Games played	GS	Games started	MPG	Minutes per game
FG%	Field goal percentage	3P%	3-point field goal percentage	FT%	Free throw percentage
RPG	Rebounds per game	APG	Assists per game	SPG	Steals per game
BPG	Blocks per game	PPG	Points per game	**Bold**	Career high

=== NBA ===
==== Regular season ====
Year	Team	GP	GS	MPG	FG%	3P%	FT%	RPG	APG	SPG	BPG	PPG
1978–79	Denver	20		4.4	.385		.500	1.2	.3	.0	.2	1.3
1980–81	Portland	6		5.5	**.500**	–	.200	3.0	.3	.0	.3	1.5
1981–82	Milwaukee	**35**	**1**	5.8	.344	–	.400	1.2	.4	**.2**	.3	.8
1982–83	San Antonio	14	0	**10.6**	.412	–	**.600**	**3.4**	**.5**	**.2**	**.4**	**2.2**
1983–84	Cleveland	7	0	3.3	.125	–	.500	1.3	.1	.1	.1	.7
Career		82	1	6.0	.370	–	.442	1.7	.3	.1	.3	1.2
