= Western Alamance High School =

Location
- 1731 N NC 87; Elon, North Carolina 27244; United States; 36°09′11″N 79°29′55″W

Information
- Type: Public
- Established: 1962 (64 years ago)
- School district: Alamance-Burlington School System
- CEEB code: 341180
- Principal: Bear Bryant
- Teaching staff: 61.34 (FTE)
- Grades: 9–12
- Enrollment: 1,135 (2023-2024)
- Student to teacher ratio: 18.50
- Colors: Navy and white
- Mascot: Warriors
- Yearbook: We-Hi-Wa
- Website: www.abss.k12.nc.us/o/wahs

Western Alamance High School (WAHS) is a public high school located in Elon, North Carolina. It is one of seven high schools in the Alamance-Burlington School System. The school runs on block scheduling from 8:45 am to 3:45 pm. Its mission is to challenge students' capabilities, while maintaining an environment that preaches respect, innovation, and care for others.

== Athletics ==
Western Alamance is classified as a 3A school by the North Carolina High School Athletic Association and is a member of the Triad 3A Conference.

The Warriors' football team went to the finals of the state championship four consecutive years, from 2004 to 2007. They won the 2007 state championship on December 8, 2007, 62–36 against North Gaston High School. The Championship win was the first for the school's football program under long-time coach Hal Capps. The Fieldhouse has been named in Coach Capps's honor.

On March 10, 2010, Jeff Snuffer, an 18-year-old. veteran assistant coach, was named the new Head Coach of the Western Alamance Warriors, succeeding Coach Capps.

Western Alamance also has 2A State Championships in Men's Tennis (1994, 1998, 1999, 2000) and Men's Golf (2001).

Western Alamance also has had individual 3A state champions in Women's Track and Field: Lydia Laws 2012 300m Hurdles (44.84), 2013, 300m Hurdles (43.79); and Alexis Dickerson 2013, Shot Put (39–8.25).

Western Alamance also has had individual 3A state champions in Men's Track and Field: Scott Grell, 1987 110m Hurdles (14.6) and 300m Hurdles (37.8 3A state record time); Eric Sellars 1990, Pole Vault (13–6); Albert Royster 1992, 800m (1:54.93 3A state record time)

In 2021, Western Alamance won the 3A State Boys Soccer Championship, beating Hickory 1-0.

In the 2024-25 school year, Western Alamance won three team state championships: boys’ soccer, girls’ basketball, and girls’ soccer.

Their girls’ soccer team captured the NCHSAA 3A state championship with a season record of 24-0-1, defeating South Point in the final.

the boys’ soccer team pulled off a dramatic comeback in the state championship, erasing a 3-goal halftime deficit to win 4-3 in overtime over Asheboro.

In the NCHSAA 3A girls' basketball state championship game, they defeated Stuart Cramer by a score of 76-58. This was the first girls' basketball state championship in Western Alamance’s history.

Also in the 2024-25 year, there were individual state honors: e.g., a junior, Michaela Bentley, won the Class 3-A diving state championship.

== Clubs and Extracurriculars ==
Western Alamance offers over 30 student clubs and organizations, ranging from academic honor societies to performing arts. Some of the school’s most prestigious and active groups include:

- National Honor Society (NHS) – Recognizes outstanding academic achievement and leadership; organizes community tutoring and volunteer drives.
- Student Government Association (SGA) – Plays a central role in school policy discussions, spirit events, and civic engagement programs.
- Warrior Band Program – The award-winning marching and concert bands perform across the region, frequently earning superior ratings at MPA festivals.
- Drama Club / Theatre Arts – Produces multiple plays and musicals each year, often collaborating with local theater professionals.
- HOSA (Future Health Professionals) – One of the top student medical clubs in the county, with members advancing to state-level competitions.
- DECA – Western Alamance’s DECA chapter has received regional recognition for entrepreneurship and business plan presentations.
- Key Club & Beta Club – Lead large-scale service projects, including food drives and environmental cleanups in Alamance County.
- STEM Club / Robotics – Competes in North Carolina regional robotics tournaments and hosts the school’s annual STEM Week showcase.

== Academics ==
Throughout the 2020s, Western Alamance High School has consistently ranked among the top public high schools in Alamance County and the North Carolina Piedmont Triad region.

In 2024, the school was named a PTEC Signature School by the Piedmont Triad Education Consortium (PTEC), recognizing its innovation in classroom instruction, academic growth, and student engagement.

The award cited Western Alamance’s:

- Expansion of Advanced Placement (AP) courses and dual enrollment programs with Alamance Community College.
- Improved mathematics proficiency, particularly through personalized tutoring and data-driven intervention programs.
- Strong Career and Technical Education (CTE) partnerships, including collaborative programs with Elon University and local businesses.

The school’s academic performance has remained above the North Carolina state average in most tested subjects:

- Math III proficiency: ~80.8% (state average ~66%).
- Reading proficiency: ~59% (state average ~50%).
- Graduation rate: 85–87%.

== Notable alumni ==
- Frank Haith, assistant men's basketball coach at The University of Texas at Austin.
- Joshua Karty, NFL placekicker for the Los Angeles Rams.
- A'Darius Pegues, professional basketball center.
