= Oneida Cotton Mills and Scott-Mebane Manufacturing Company Complex =

- U.S. National Register of Historic Places
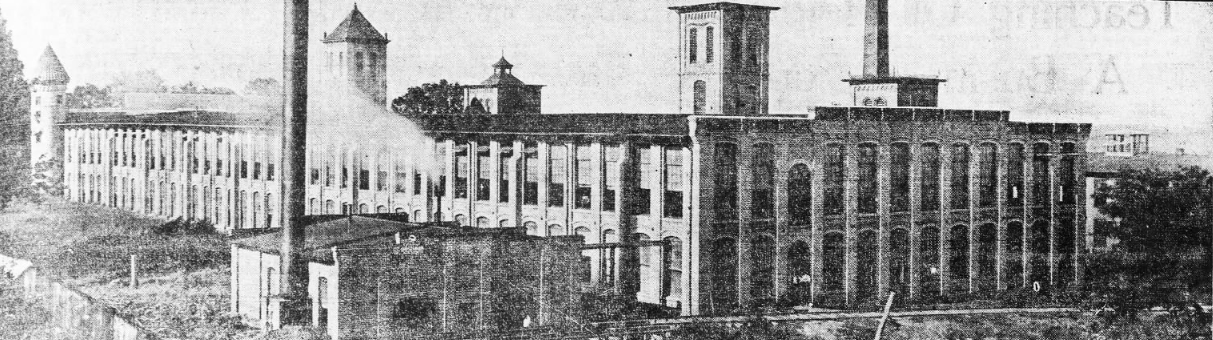
- Oneida Cotton Mill, 1917

- Location within North Carolina Location within the United States
- Location: 219 & 220 W. Harden St., Graham, North Carolina
- Coordinates: 36°04′14″N 79°24′15″W
- Area: 7.66 acres (3.10 ha)
- Built: 1882; c. 1898; c.1900; 1931
- NRHP reference No.: 14000291
- Added to NRHP: June 9, 2014

The Oneida Cotton Mills and Scott-Mebane Manufacturing Company Complex, also known as the Scott and Donnell Mill, is a historic hosiery mill building in Graham, Alamance County, North Carolina. It consists of four contributing buildings and one contributing structure. The buildings date from 1882 into the 1940s; all are red-brick except for a small shed-roofed bathroom building from the 1940s. The complex includes the Scott and Donnell Mill (1882, c. 1959), a smokestack (1882), Holt Mill (c. 1898; c. 1959), Scott-Mebane Manufacturing Company (c. 1900; c. 1906; c. 1959), and opener Room (c. 1931).

It was added to the National Register of Historic Places in 2014.
