= Jerome Evans (American football) =

American football coach (1929–1995)

- Born: Jerome Thomas Evans Jr. August 29, 1929; Goldsboro, North Carolina, U.S.
- Died: August 13, 1995 (aged 65)
- Education: North Carolina Central University
- Occupation: High school football coach
- Known for: First black man in the US South to serve as head football coach at a formerly all-white high school
- Spouse: Helen Wall (m. 1957)
- Children: 2

Jerome Thomas Evans Jr. was a black high school football coach in the state of North Carolina during the 1950s through the 1970s. He became head football coach at Walter M. Williams High School in 1970, later serving as assistant principal. He died on August 13, 1995, in Burlington, North Carolina, United States at the age of 65.

Evans began his coaching career as head football, basketball and baseball coach at H.B. Sugg High School in Farmville, NC in 1954 at a time when there were only two football programs in the Pitt County area for African-American youth. In 1957, Evans married Helen Wall. Evans remained at H.B. Sugg High School for seven years, until 1962 when he moved on and became head coach at John Armstrong Chaloner High School in Roanoke Rapids, North Carolina, taking the school's football team from a 1–9 record to 8-2-1 in his third year. After three years in Roanoke Rapids, Evans and his family moved in 1965 to Windsor, North Carolina, where he had been appointed Head Football Coach at the all-black high school, Southwestern High School. Evans stayed at Southwestern for only one year. In 1966, Helen was offered a teaching position at Jordan Sellars High School in Burlington, North Carolina. Evans was also offered a coaching and teaching position, and in the late spring of 1966, Evans and his family moved to Burlington. His period of service at Walter M. Williams High School is documented in the book Black Coach by Pat Jordan.

== Book references ==
- Black Coach, Pat Jordan, Dodd-Mead 1971
