= Carole W. Troxler =

American historian and author

Carole Watterson Troxler (née Carole Watterson) is an American historian, educator, and author. She is a Professor Emerita of Elon University.

== Early life and education ==
Carole Watterson was born in LaGrange, Georgia. She received an A.B. degree from the University of Georgia, followed by a PhD in history from the University of North Carolina at Chapel Hill.

== Career ==
Troxler wrote a bicentennial history pamphlet for the North Carolina Department of Cultural Resources in 1976. In 1977, Troxler was invited to present a paper at the University of Edinburgh during a joint program sponsored by university's School of Scottish Studies and its history department. In March 1988, Troxler was promoted to full professor with Elon College's history department.

Troxler's research for Shuttle & Plow: A History of Alamance County, North Carolina (1999) led to later biographies of the African American Reconstruction leader Wyatt Outlaw and Sallie Stockard, a pioneer in women’s higher education. Susan Schramm-Pate wrote that Troxler’s treatment of Stockard is a "masterfully crafted biography."

Troxler's 2011 book, Farming Dissenters, is an investigation of the pre-Revolutionary Regulator Movement, which Alan D. Watson characterized as “the most historiographically exciting and controversial topic in North Carolina's past.” Watson found her account of the May 16, 1771 defeat of the Regulators to be "the best account available of the bloodiest confrontation among white English colonials in the eighteenth century." This period is the context for Troxler's Young Adult history novel, The Red Dog, which received the 2017 Historical Book Award from the North Carolina Society of Historians.

In 2003, the North Carolina Society of Historians recognized her book, Pyle’s Defeat, and a digital reference she edited, Alamance County, N.C., Transcripts of Census and Tax Records: Vol. 1.

== Personal life ==
She was married to George Wesley Troxler (1942–2019) who also worked as a history professor at Elon. They were philanthropic supporters of the university, and in 2013 were honoured for their lifelong impact on the school. In 2010, they jointly received the Christopher Crittenden Memorial Award from the North Carolina Literary and Historical Association.

== Publications ==
- The Loyalist Experience in North Carolina. North Carolina Department of Cultural Resources, Division of Archives and History. 1976. ISBN 9780865261143.
- Shuttle & Plow: A history of Alamance County, North Carolina, co-authored with William M. Vincent
- Farming Dissenters: The Regulator Movement in Piedmont North Carolina (2011)
- Red Dog: A Tale of the Carolina Frontier (2017), a novel
- Sallie Stockard : adversities met by an educated woman of the new South. Chapel Hill, NC: North Carolina Office of Archives and History. 2021. ISBN 9780865264922.
- Pyle's Defeat: Deception at the Racepath. Graham, NC: Alamance County Historical Association. 2003.

=== Articles ===
- "The Migration of Carolina and Georgia Loyalists to Nova Scotia and New Brunswick", Ph.D. dissertation, University of North Carolina at Chapel Hill (1974)
- "Refuge, Resistance, and Reward: The Southern Loyalists' Claim on East Florida, The Journal of Southern History, Volume LV Number 4, November 1989
- "William Stephens and the "Georgia Malcontents": Conciliation, Conflict, and Capitulation", The Georgia Historical Quarterly, 1983
