= William P. Morrow House =

Historic house in North Carolina, United States

- U.S. National Register of Historic Places
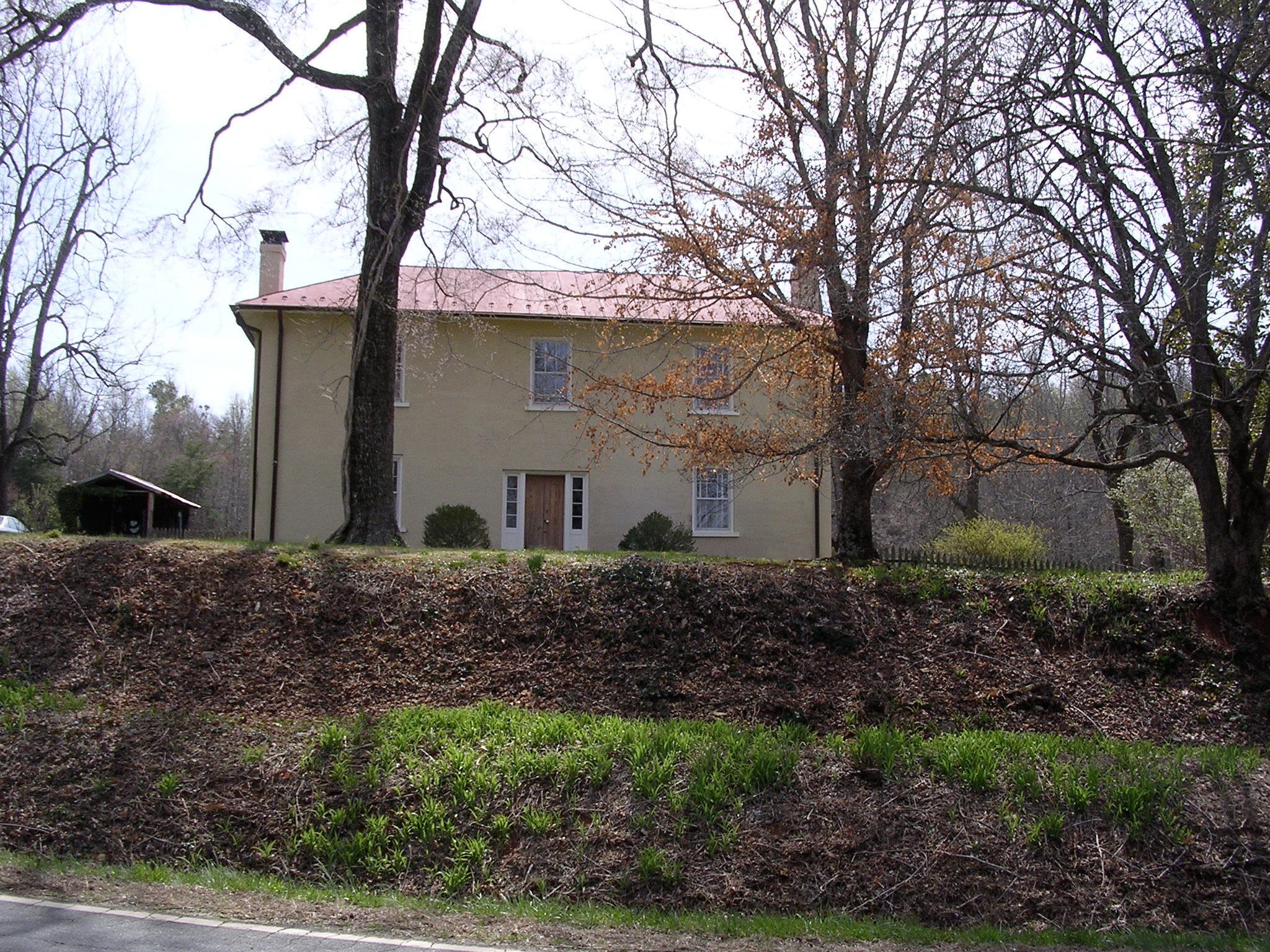

- Location within North Carolina Location within the United States
- Location: NC 2146, 0.1 miles W of jct. with NC 2145 (3017 Saxapahaw-Bethlehem Church Rd.), near Graham, North Carolina
- Coordinates: 35°57′15″N 79°16′45″W
- Area: 14 acres (5.7 ha)
- Architectural style: Greek Revival
- NRHP reference No.: 06000687
- Added to NRHP: August 9, 2006

William P. Morrow House is a historic home located near Graham, Alamance County, North Carolina. It was built about 1855, and is a two-story, three-bay, stuccoed brick dwelling in the Greek Revival style. It has brick end chimneys and a low hipped roof. A 1 1/2-story rear ell was added in 1984–1985.

It was added to the National Register of Historic Places in 2006.
