= Graham, North Carolina =

City in North Carolina, United States

- City
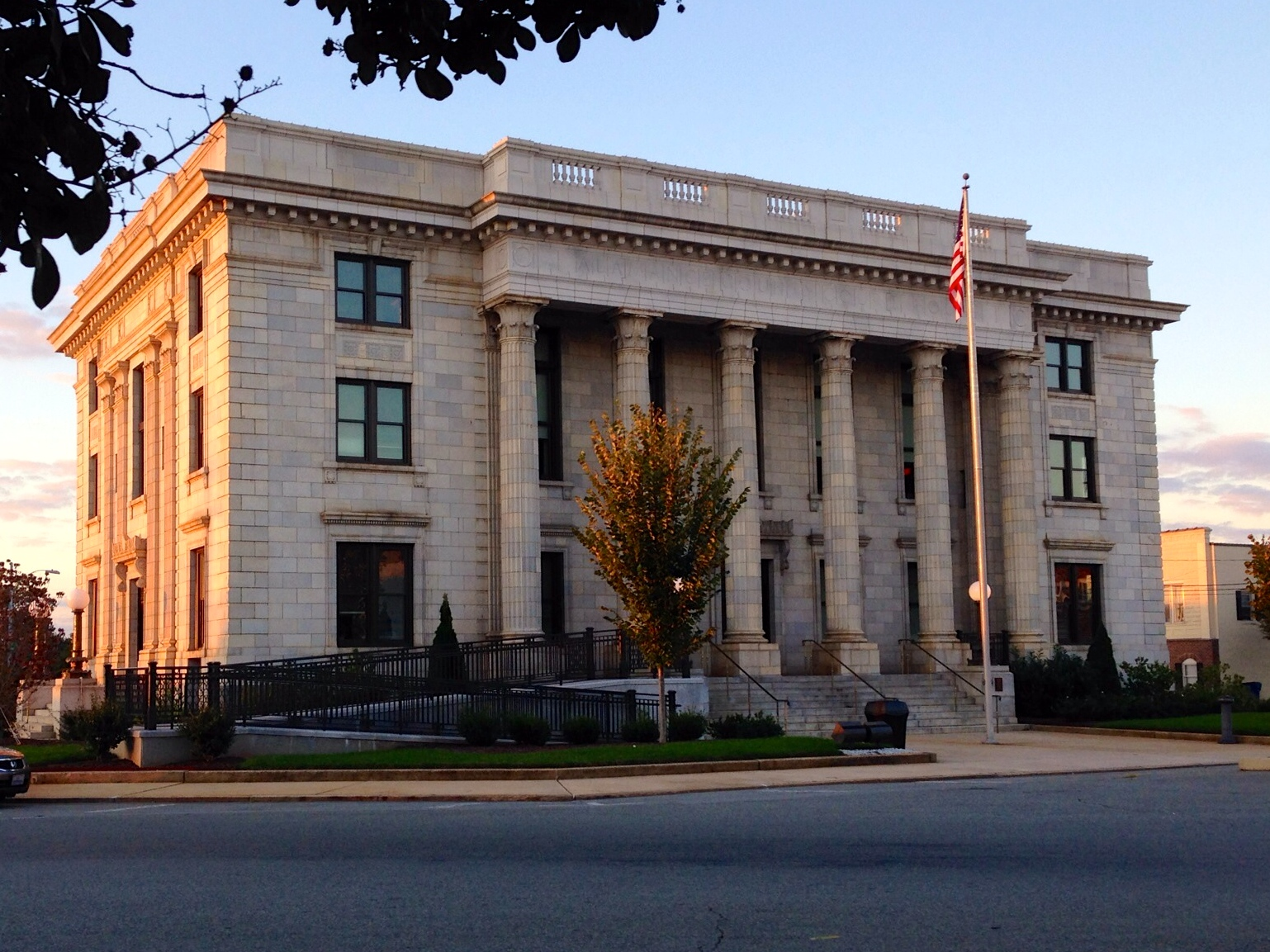
- Alamance County Courthouse

- Seal

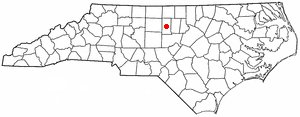
- Location of Graham, North Carolina

- Location within North Carolina Location within the United States
- Coordinates: 36°03′30″N 79°23′20″W
- Country: United States
- State: North Carolina
- County: Alamance
- Founded: 1849
- Incorporated: 1851
- Named after: William A. Graham

Government
  - Mayor: Chelsea Dickey

Area
  - Total: 10.49 sq mi (27.17 km^{2})
  - Land: 10.42 sq mi (26.99 km^{2})
  - Water: 0.069 sq mi (0.18 km^{2})
- Elevation: 594 ft (181 m)

Population (2020)
  - Total: 17,157
  - Density: 1,646.4/sq mi (635.66/km^{2})
- Time zone: UTC−5 (Eastern (EST))
  - Summer (DST): UTC−4 (EDT)
- ZIP code: 27253
- Area code: 336
- FIPS code: 37-27280
- GNIS feature ID: 2403722
- Website: cityofgraham.com

Graham is a city and the county seat of Alamance County, North Carolina, United States. It is part of the Burlington, North Carolina Metropolitan Statistical Area. As of the 2020 census the population was 17,153.

== History ==
Graham was laid out in 1849 as the county seat of the newly formed Alamance County, and was incorporated as a town in 1851; it became a city in 1961. It was named for William Alexander Graham, U.S. senator from North Carolina (1840–1843) and governor of North Carolina (1845–1849).

The lynching of Wyatt Outlaw, the first African-American Town Commissioner and Constable of Graham, on February 26, 1870, by the Ku Klux Klan, along with the assassination of State Senator John W. Stephens at the Caswell County Courthouse, provoked Governor William Woods Holden to declare martial law in Alamance and Caswell Counties, resulting in the Kirk-Holden War of 1870.

=== National Register of Historic Places ===
Alamance County Courthouse, Cedarock Park Historic District, Graham Historic District, William P. Morrow House, North Main Street Historic District, and Oneida Cotton Mills and Scott-Mebane Manufacturing Company Complex are listed on the National Register of Historic Places.

== Geography ==
Graham is bordered to the north and the west by the city of Burlington and to the northeast by the town of Haw River. The Haw River runs along the east edge of Graham, and the city extends south as far as Alamance Creek. Interstate 85 runs through the city, leading east to Durham and west to Greensboro.

According to the United States Census Bureau, the city has a total area of 9.7 square miles (25.1 km^{2}), of which 9.6 square miles (24.9 km^{2}) is land and 0.077 square miles (0.2 km^{2}), or 0.67%, is water.

=== Climate ===
The climate in this area is characterized by relatively high temperatures and evenly distributed precipitation throughout the year. According to the Köppen Climate Classification system, Graham has a Humid subtropical climate, abbreviated "Cfa" on climate maps.

== Education ==
The local school system is known as the Alamance-Burlington School System, which was created by a merger between the Alamance County School System and the Burlington City School System in 1996.

Local public schools in Graham include:

- Southern Alamance High School
- Graham High School
- Graham Middle School
- Southern Middle School
- Alexander Wilson Elementary School
- B. Everett Jordan Elementary School
- North Graham Elementary School
- South Graham Elementary School

Private schools include:

- Alamance Christian School

Graham is also home to Alamance Community College, a two-year technical college.

== Demographics ==
Historical population
Census	Pop.	Note	%±
1870	502		—
1880	379		−24.5%
1890	991		161.5%
1900	2,052		107.1%
1910	2,504		22.0%
1920	2,366		−5.5%
1930	2,972		25.6%
1940	4,339		46.0%
1950	5,026		15.8%
1960	7,723		53.7%
1970	8,172		5.8%
1980	8,674		6.1%
1990	10,426		20.2%
2000	12,833		23.1%
2010	14,153		10.3%
2020	17,157		21.2%
2025 (est.)	20,131	▲	17.3%
U.S. Decennial Census

=== 2020 census ===
As of the 2020 census, Graham had a population of 17,157. The median age was 38.7 years. 21.9% of residents were under the age of 18 and 16.8% of residents were 65 years of age or older. For every 100 females there were 88.7 males, and for every 100 females age 18 and over there were 85.1 males age 18 and over.

99.1% of residents lived in urban areas, while 0.9% lived in rural areas.

There were 7,199 households in Graham, including 3,962 families. Of all households, 29.2% had children under the age of 18 living in them, 36.7% were married-couple households, 18.4% were households with a male householder and no spouse or partner present, and 37.9% were households with a female householder and no spouse or partner present. About 33.2% of all households were made up of individuals and 12.4% had someone living alone who was 65 years of age or older.

There were 7,840 housing units, of which 8.2% were vacant. The homeowner vacancy rate was 2.7% and the rental vacancy rate was 8.2%.

Graham racial composition
Race	Number	Percentage
White (non-Hispanic)	8,420	49.08%
Black or African American (non-Hispanic)	4,426	25.8%
Native American	82	0.48%
Asian	222	1.29%
Pacific Islander	6	0.03%
Other/Mixed	788	4.59%
Hispanic or Latino	3,213	18.73%

=== 2000 census ===
At the 2000 census there were 12,833 people, 5,241 households, and 3,385 families living in the city. The population density was 1,579.3 inhabitants per square mile (609.8/km^{2}). There were 5,685 housing units at an average density of 699.6 units per square mile (270.1 units/km^{2}). The racial composition of the city was: 72.88% White, 21.64% Black or African American, 10.14% Hispanic or Latino American, 0.73% Asian American, 0.44% Native American, 0.0% Native Hawaiian or Other Pacific Islander, 3.19% some other race, and 1.12% two or more races. Of the 5,241 households 29.9% had children under the age of 18 living with them, 44.0% were married couples living together, 16.2% had a female householder with no husband present, and 35.4% were non-families. 30.1% of households were one person and 11.8% were one person aged 65 or older. The average household size was 2.37 and the average family size was 2.91.

The age distribution was 24.0% under the age of 18, 9.9% from 18 to 24, 31.8% from 25 to 44, 20.1% from 45 to 64, and 14.1% 65 or older. The median age was 34 years. For every 100 females, there were 90.1 males. For every 100 females age 18 and over, there were 86.4 males.

The median household income was $35,706 and the median family income was $40,769. Males had a median income of $27,844 versus $22,163 for females. The per capita income for the city was $17,865. About 11.9% of families and 14.9% of the population were below the poverty line, including 19.8% of those under age 18 and 14.9% of those age 65 or over.

== Controversies ==
In 2026, public records requests by The Alamance News revealed that Graham city council members communicated by email and text about issues such as plans to relocate Sesquicentennial Park and data from Flock cameras, in apparent violation of the state's open meeting laws.

== Notable people ==
- Jane Albright, women's college basketball coach (Northern Illinois Huskies, Wisconsin Badgers, Wichita State Shockers)
- Jesse Branson, basketball player (Philadelphia 76ers, New Orleans Buccaneers)
- Clise Dudley, baseball pitcher (Brooklyn Robins, Philadelphia Phillies, Pittsburgh Pirates)
- Donnell S. Holt, business executive (Cannon Mills)
- Jim Holt, baseball player (Minnesota Twins, Oakland Athletics)
- Jamie Newman, football player (Philadelphia Eagles, Hamilton Tiger-Cats)
- Wyatt Outlaw, politician
- Jeanne Robertson, comedian and beauty pageant titleholder (Miss North Carolina 1963)
