= Alamance County Courthouse =

Courthouse in North Carolina, US

- U.S. National Register of Historic Places
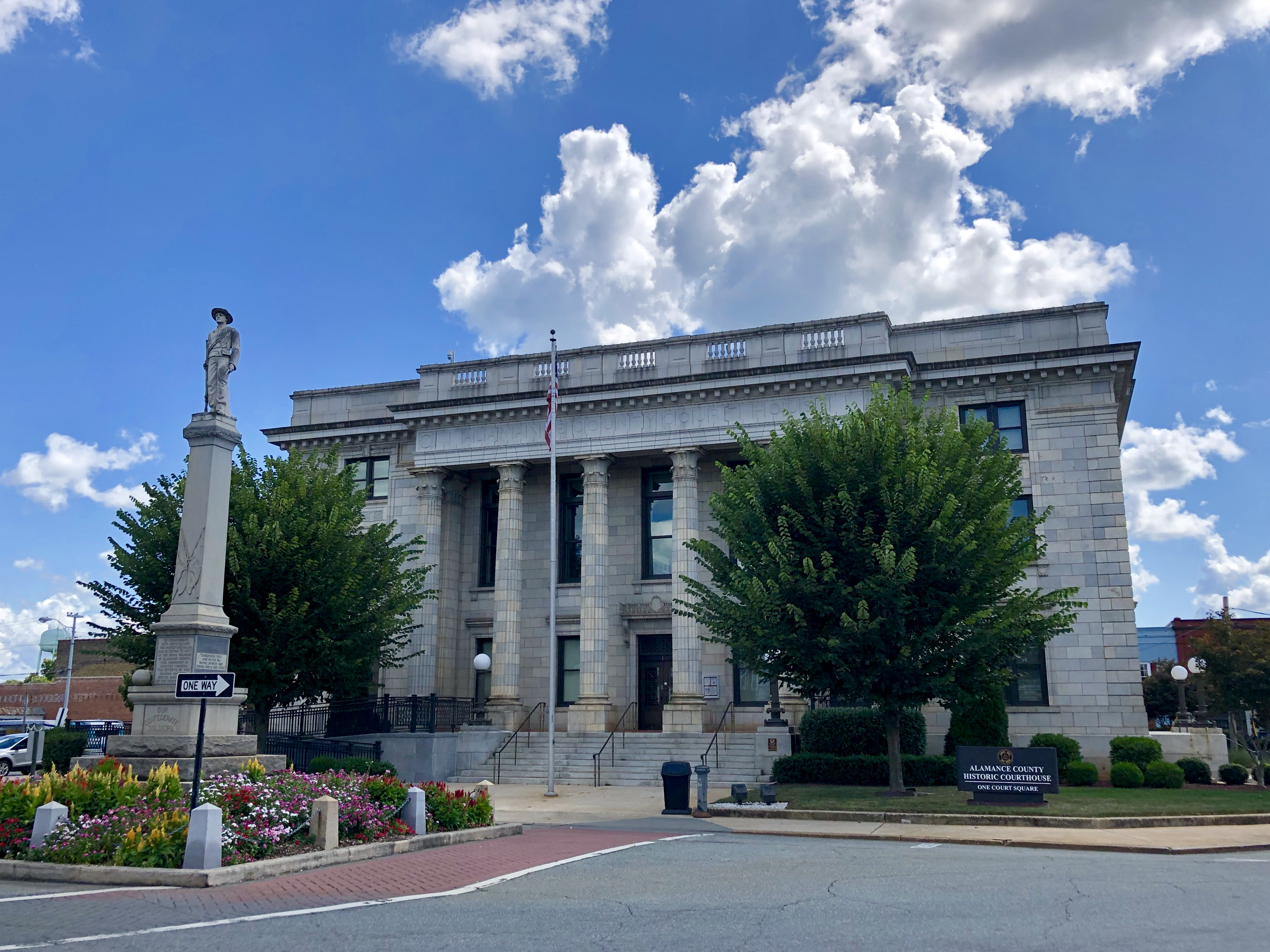
- Alamance County Courthouse and Confederate Monument

- Location within North Carolina Location within the United States
- Interactive map showing the location of Alamance County Courthouse
- Location: Courthouse Square, Graham, North Carolina
- Coordinates: 36°4′9″N 79°24′2″W
- Area: less than one acre
- Built: 1923
- Architect: Harry Barton
- Architectural style: Classical Revival
- MPS: North Carolina County Courthouses TR
- NRHP reference No.: 79001655
- Added to NRHP: May 10, 1979

The Alamance County Courthouse in Graham, North Carolina, was built in 1923. It was listed on the National Register of Historic Places in 1979.

== History ==
Alamance County has had several courthouses throughout its history.

=== Original Court ===
The county's founding in 1849 was held at the Providence Meeting House in what would eventually become the Town of Graham. The Orange County Courts had held court here to serve the needs of the western half of the county prior to the founding of Alamance County in 1849. The first Court Session was held in June 1849.

=== First Courthouse ===
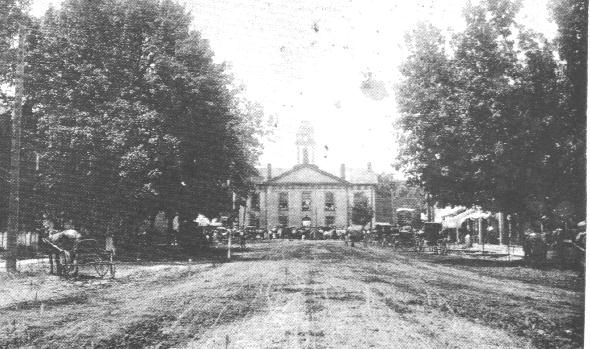
The original Alamance County Courthouse, circa 1910. Note the cupola that housed the bell.

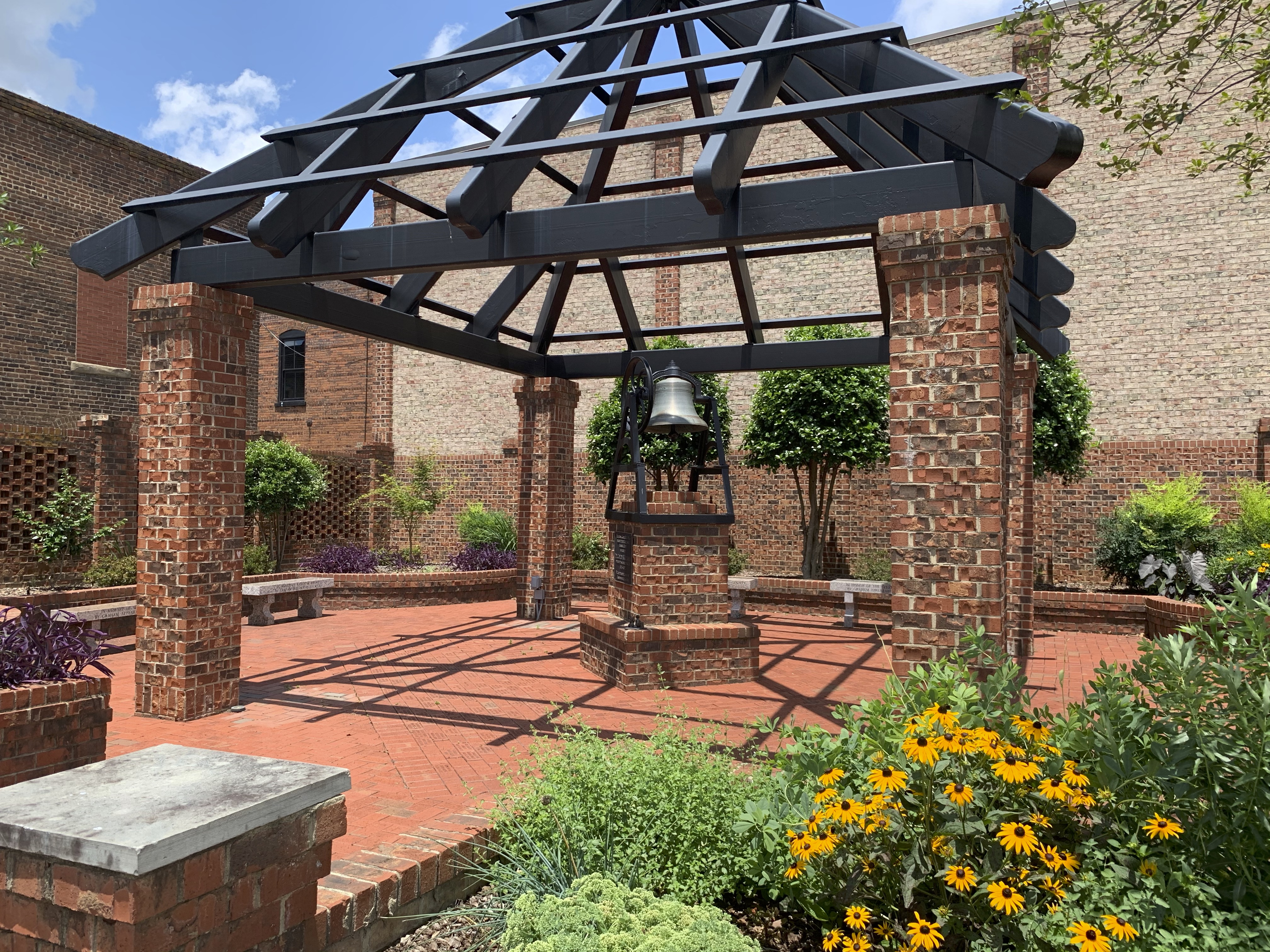
Sesquicentennial Park in Graham, featuring the original courthouse's bell.

On July 17, 1849, the Alamance County Commissioners voted to spend $8,000 to construct a courthouse in a 75-acre (300,000 m^{2}) area located approximately 2 miles (3.2 km) south of the Providence Church. The County Commissioners expected to pay for the courthouse through the sale of land in the new county seat of Graham. They also levied an ad valorem tax on property of 35.25 cents per $100 valuation and a poll tax of 73.75 cents.

The courthouse was constructed with brick for the sum of $6,400 and was opened in 1852. In 1888, 2 new wings were added to the courthouse and the exterior of the courthouse was stuccoed. The courthouse remained open until 1923, when the County Commissioners voted for a new courthouse to replace the over 70-year-old building. In 1914, a memorial to Confederate soldiers was added to the courthouse grounds.

The original courthouse was demolished in November 1923.

==== Sesquicentennial Park ====
One of the only remaining pieces of the old courthouse is the 400 lb (180 kg) bell from the cupola, which currently resides at Sesquicentennial Park in Graham. The park was established in 1994 to celebrate the 150th anniversary of Alamance County and resides in the northwest corner of the city's Courthouse Square. The courthouse bell is the centerpiece of the park, which includes planters with vegetation, benches, and a metal framework over a red brick courtyard.

== Historic Courthouse ==
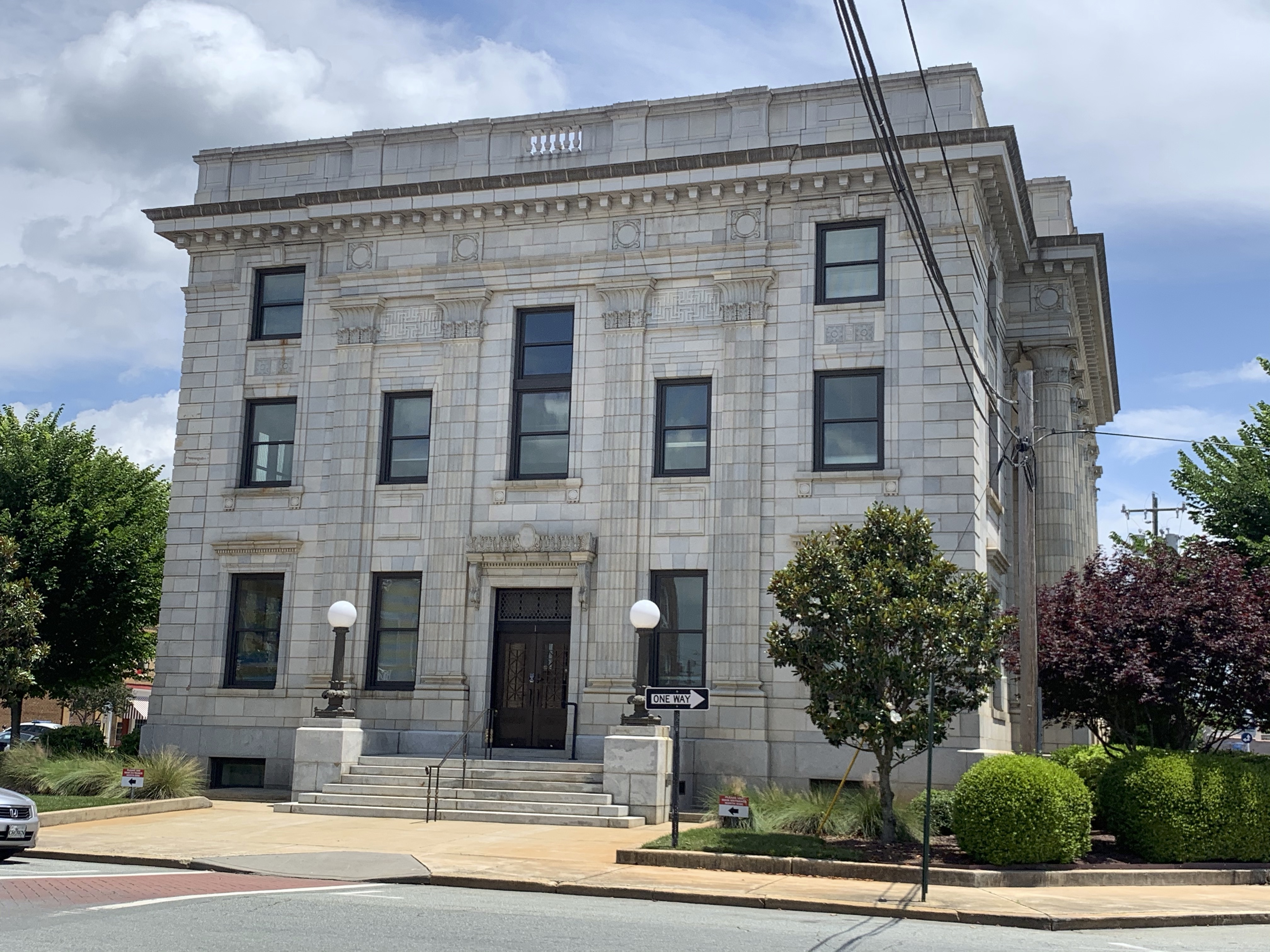
West face of Alamance County Courthouse featuring faux columns. The east face is identical, save the addition of an area for handicapped access to the courthouse elevator.

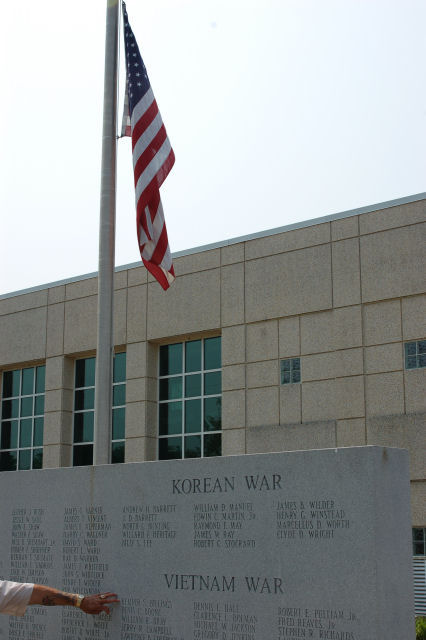
Alamance County War Memorial with J. B. Allen Courthouse in background.

The current Alamance County Courthouse that sits on the National Register of Historic Places, began construction in 1923 and was opened to the public on November 23, 1924, at a cost of $253,925.82. The courthouse was built in the Classical Revival style and features terracotta stonework, dental tooth molding, and metal-masonry floors. The courthouse originally housed the court system, county government offices, the sheriff's office, state government offices, agricultural offices, health department offices, and federal offices. The original sheriff's office is located in the southwestern 1st floor corner of the building, which features metal-framed shatter-resistant windows.

The courthouse sits in the middle of Courthouse Square in Graham and is surrounded by parking spaces for parallel parking. The north and south entrances to the courthouse have stairs that reach to the first floor of the courthouse, each entrance featuring six Corinthian-style columns rising from the steps external steps to the tops of the courtroom windows, with each column featuring bird control spikes. The north entrance is the only public entrance and has a handicapped-accessible ramp installed during the 2009-11 renovation. The north entrance also features the 1914 Confederate memorial. The east and west entrances of the courthouse feature faux columns, street lanterns, and steps that lead to the first floor of the courthouse for courthouse employees. The east entrance also features a handicapped-accessible entrance for access to the courthouse's elevator. The base of the courthouse is granite, while the structure of the courthouse is terracotta.

Internally, the courthouse has four floors. The basement houses offices and a small courtroom for civil proceedings. The first floor houses the offices of the Clerk of Court and features a large open hall with hand-carved dental tooth moulding, granite floors, and hand-. Along with offices and meeting rooms, the second floor is also the primary access point for the building's main courtroom. The courtroom features theater-style seating for audience members. The judge's bench is said to have been from the original courthouse. The courtroom also features balcony seating accessible from the courthouse's third floor, which also features office space and meeting rooms. The ceiling of the courtroom on the 2nd floor is silk. The Courthouse was added to the National Register of Historic Places in 1979.

The courthouse has been renovated many times throughout its history. In 1996, a $1.2 million repair was done to the roof of the building to prevent further leakage from outside. Between August 2010 and September 2011, the courthouse underwent a $3 million renovation to repair massive water damage, prevent future water damage, improve access to cramped spaces, improve overall safety, and restore the interior of the courthouse to its 1923 appearance as much as possible. The renovated courtroom removed panels that concealed the courtroom's windows and replaced them with soundproof windows, allowing for natural light to be used to reduce energy costs. Additionally, building environmental controls were improved to reduce future damage and provide a more comfortable workspace. Originally intended to reopen in June, the reopening was delayed due to a fire that occurred on May 9, 2011. The courthouse was re-opened in a ceremony on September 12, 2011.

In order to address naming issues, March 7, 2011, the name of the Alamance County Courthouse was changed to the Alamance County Historic Courthouse.

== Other Courthouses ==
In order to accommodate the growing needs of the court system without significantly affecting the current courthouse, Alamance County has added 2 courthouses over the years. The Courthouse Annex began construction in 1966 and was opened to the public in 1967, and is currently connected to the Alamance County Office Building, which began construction in 1974. The Courthouse Annex was renovated in late 2009 and early 2010 and reopened in April 2010 as the Civil Courts Building.

Due to problems with noise, building access, asbestos, and dangerous conditions, the county and the court system battled in the late 1980s and early 1990s over the renovation of the Old Courthouse and the construction of a new courthouse. Minor renovations were done to the Old Courthouse, and construction began on a new Criminal Courts Building, referred to locally as the "New Courthouse" in 1992. Construction of the modernist styled structure was completed in 1993 and the building opened to the public on December 22, 1993. In 2010, to address confusion with different courthouses in the county, the building was renamed the Alamance County Criminal Courts building. In 2017, the Criminal Courts Building was renamed the J. B. Allen, Jr. Courthouse after a former judge. The J. B. Allen building is also the site of the Alamance County War Memorial, dedicated to soldiers who died in conflicts since the founding of the county in 1849.

== Temporary Courthouses ==
For the 2009-11 Renovations, the Offices of the Old Courthouse were moved to the Youth Services Building, approximately 1 block west of the Courthouse.

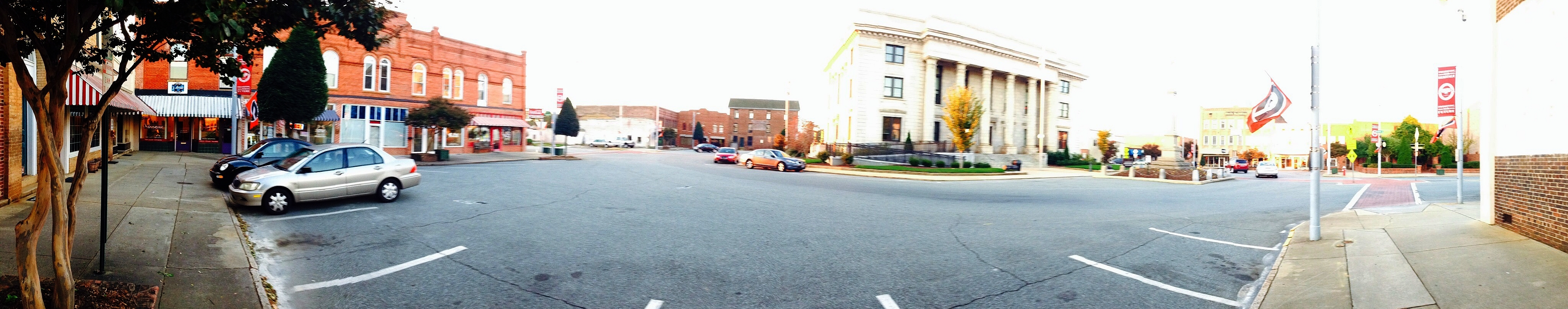
View of Alamance County Courthouse from northeast corner

== See also ==
National Register of Historic Places listings in Alamance County, North Carolina
