= Southern Alamance High School =

American public school in North Carolina

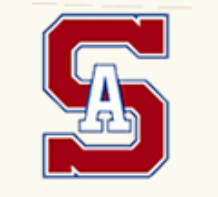

Location
- 631 Southern High School Road; Graham, North Carolina 27253; United States
- Coordinates: 36°00′07″N 79°24′23″W

Information
- Other names: Southern, SA
- Type: Public
- Established: 1960 (66 years ago)
- School district: Alamance-Burlington School System
- CEEB code: 340505
- Principal: Kristy Mills
- Teaching staff: 76.44 (FTE)
- Grades: 9–12
- Enrollment: 1,427 (2018–19)
- Student to teacher ratio: 18.67
- Colors: Red, white, blue
- Mascot: Patriot
- Rival: Eastern Alamance High School
- Website: www.abss.k12.nc.us/o/sahs

Southern Alamance High School is a public high school located in Graham, North Carolina, United States. It is one of seven high schools in the Alamance-Burlington School System.

== History ==
The former Alamance County high schools of Alexander Wilson, Sylvan, E. M. Holt, and Eli Whitney, were consolidated into a new high school; Southern Alamance High School. A school bond passed in 1958 to finance the consolidation. Opening day of Southern Alamance High was December 12, 1960.

== Athletics ==
Southern Alamance High School sports teams are known as the Patriots, with the school colors being red, white and blue. The school is a member of the North Carolina High School Athletic Association (NCHSAA) and is classified as a 6A school. They are a member of the Mid-Carolina 4A/5A/6A Conference.

== Clubs ==
Southern Alamance has a wide array of clubs for students to join. Each year, student council puts on events such as homecoming, holiday cheer, coming home, and many others.
