= Scott Reynolds Nelson =

Georgia Athletic Association Professor of History at the University of Georgia

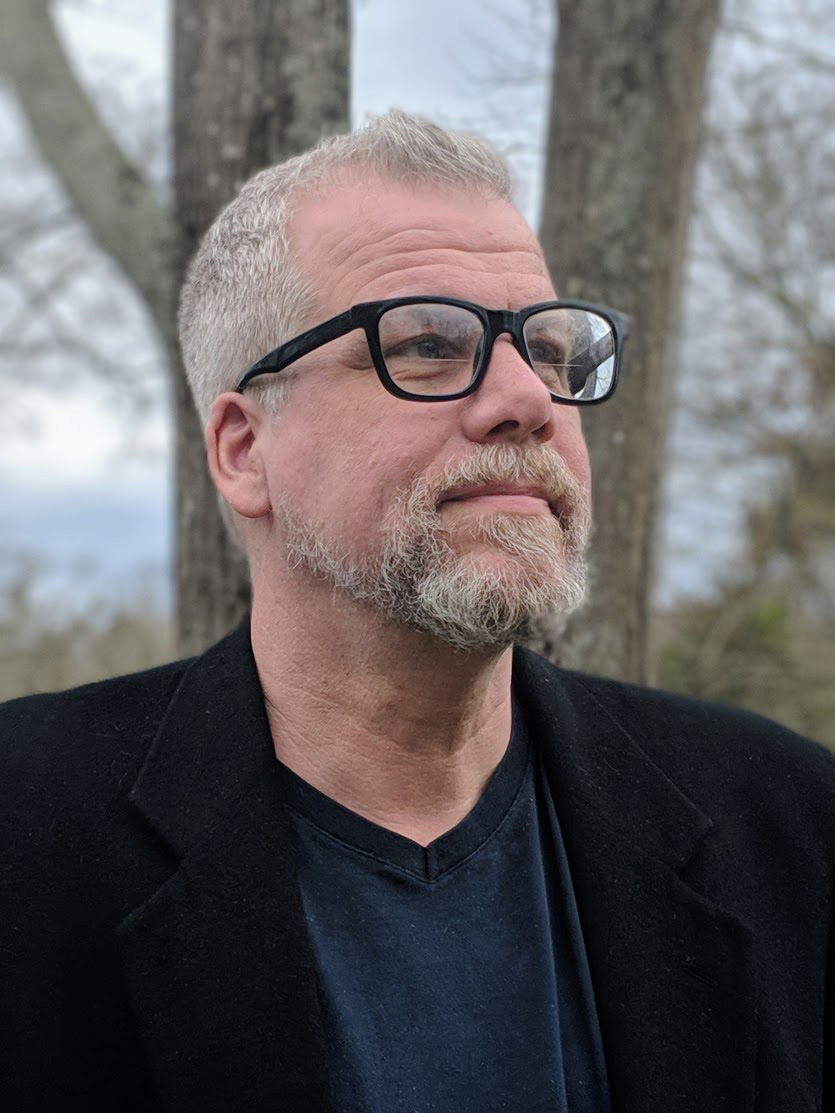
- Born: 1964 (age 61–62)
- Spouse: Cindy Hahamovitch (1985-present)
- Writing career
- Genre: non-fiction
- Subject: arts
- Notable works: Steel Drivin' Man, Oceans of Grain
- Notable awards: Marfield Prize; Merle Curti Award; Anisfield-Wolf Book Award; Virginia Literary Award for Nonfiction

Scott Reynolds Nelson is the Georgia Athletic Association Professor of History at the University of Georgia. He was formerly the Legum Professor of History at the College of William and Mary. He is a historian of the Long Nineteenth Century. He specializes in Labor history, international finance, the history of science, and global commodities.

== Awards received ==
for Steel Drivin' Man

- 2006 National Award for Arts Writing
- 2007 Merle Curti Award
- 2007 Anisfield-Wolf Award
- 2007 Virginia Literary Award for Nonfiction

for Ain't Nothing But a Man

- 2008 Publishers Weekly Best Books of the Year
- 2009 Aesop Prize (Folklore Society of America)
- 2009 Jane Addams Prize, Women's International League for Peace and Freedom
- 2009 Notable Children's Book in the Language Arts, National Center for Teachers of English
- 2009 American Library Association Best Book for Young Adults

== Works ==
- Iron Confederacies: Southern Railways, Klan Violence, and Reconstruction. UNC Press. 1999. ISBN 978-0-8078-4803-6. "Scott Reynolds Nelson."
- Steel Drivin' Man: John Henry, the Untold Story of an American Legend. Oxford University Press. 2006. ISBN -9780195341195. "Scott Reynolds Nelson."
- Scott Reynolds Nelson; Carol Sheriff (2007). A People at War: Civilians and Soldiers in America's Civil War. Oxford University Press. ISBN 978-0-19-514654-7. "Scott Reynolds Nelson."
- Scott Reynolds Nelson; Marc Aronson (2008). Ain't Nothing But A Man: My Quest to Find the Real John Henry. National Geographic Books. ISBN 978-1-4263-0000-4. "Scott Reynolds Nelson."
- A Nation of Deadbeats: An Uncommon History of America's Financial Disasters. Random House Digital, Inc. 2012. ISBN 978-0-307-96105-1.
- Oceans of Grain: How American Wheat Remade the World. Basic Books. 2022. ISBN 978-1-5416-4646-9.
