= Alamance-Burlington School System =

School district in North Carolina, United States

The Alamance-Burlington School System is a school district covering Alamance County and the city of Burlington in the U.S. state of North Carolina. It was created in July 1996 by merging the respective systems of the county and city.

The district covers all of Alamance County.

For the school year of 2020-2021 it had 23,148 students (NC's 14th largest system) in 38 schools.

== Schools ==
=== High Schools ===
- Alamance-Burlington Early/Middle College
- Alamance Virtual School
- Career and Technical Education Center
- Hugh M. Cummings High School
- Eastern Alamance High School
- Graham High School
- Ray Street Academy
- Southeast Alamance High School
- Southern Alamance High School
- Western Alamance High School
- Walter M. Williams High School

=== Middle Schools ===
- Alamance Virtual School
- Broadview Middle School
- Graham Middle School
- Hawfields Middle School
- Turrentine Middle School
- Western Alamance Middle School
- Woodlawn Middle School
- Southern Alamance Middle School

=== Elementary Schools ===
- Alamance Virtual School
- Alexander Wilson Elementary School
- Altamahaw-Ossipee Elementary School
- Andrews Elementary School
- B Everett Jordan Elementary School
- Eastlawn Elementary School
- Elon Elementary School
- EM Holt Elementary School
- EM Yoder Elementary School
- Garrett Elementary School
- Grove Park Elementary School
- Haw River Elementary School
- Highland Elementary School
- Hillcrest Elementary School
- Newlin Elementary School
- North Graham Elementary School
- Pleasant Grove Elementary School
- Smith Elementary School
- South Graham Elementary School
- South Mebane Elementary School
- Sylvan Elementary School
