= 1963 Carolina League season =

- League: Carolina League
- Sport: Baseball
- Duration: April 19 – September 7
- Number of games: 144
- Number of teams: 10

Regular season
- Season MVP: Jim Price, Kinston Eagles

Playoffs
- League champions: Wilson Tobs
- Runners-up: Greensboro Yankees

CL seasons
- ← 1962 1964 →

The 1963 Carolina League was a Class A baseball season played between April 19 and September 7. Ten teams played a 144-game schedule, with the top two teams in each division qualifying for the post-season.

The Wilson Tobs won the Carolina League championship, defeating the Greensboro Yankees in the final round of the playoffs.

== League changes ==
- The Carolina League was reclassified from Class B to Class A beginning in the 1963 season.
- The league split into two five-team divisions, the East Division and the West Division.

== Team changes ==
- The Peninsula Senators joined the league as an expansion team. The club would be affiliated with the Washington Senators.
- The Tidewater Tides joined the league as an expansion team.
- The Raleigh Capitals ended their affiliation with the Washington Senators and began a new affiliation with the New York Mets. The club was renamed the Raleigh Mets.

== Teams ==
1963 Carolina League
Division	Team	City	MLB Affiliate	Stadium
East	Kinston Eagles	Kinston, North Carolina	Pittsburgh Pirates	Grainger Stadium
East	Peninsula Senators	Hampton, Virginia	Washington Senators	War Memorial Stadium
East	Rocky Mount Leafs	Rocky Mount, North Carolina	Cincinnati Reds	Municipal Stadium
East	Tidewater Tides	Norfolk, Virginia	None	Frank D. Lawrence Stadium
East	Wilson Tobs	Wilson, North Carolina	Minnesota Twins	Fleming Stadium
West	Burlington Indians	Burlington, North Carolina	Cleveland Indians	Burlington Athletic Stadium
West	Durham Bulls	Durham, North Carolina	Houston Colt .45s	Durham Athletic Park
West	Greensboro Yankees	Greensboro, North Carolina	New York Yankees	World War Memorial Stadium
West	Raleigh Mets	Raleigh, North Carolina	New York Mets	Devereaux Meadow
West	Winston-Salem Red Sox	Winston-Salem, North Carolina	Boston Red Sox	Ernie Shore Field

== Map of teams ==
East division West division

== Regular season ==
=== Summary ===
- The Greensboro Yankees finished with the best record in the league for the first time since 1960.
- The regular season schedule was extended from 140-games to 144-games.

=== Standings ===
East division
Team	Win	Loss	%	GB
Kinston Eagles	77	66	.538	–
Wilson Tobs	77	67	.535	0.5
Rocky Mount Leafs	72	72	.500	5.5
Tidewater Tides	65	79	.451	12.5
Peninsula Senators	58	86	.403	19.5
West division
Greensboro Yankees	85	59	.590	–
Durham Bulls	78	65	.545	6.5
Burlington Indians	77	66	.538	7.5
Winston-Salem Red Sox	67	76	.469	17.5
Raleigh Mets	62	82	.431	23

== League Leaders ==
=== Batting leaders ===
Stat	Player	Total
AVG	Art López, Greensboro Yankees	.338
H	Don Bosch, Kinston Eagles	189
R	Roy White, Greensboro Yankees	117
2B	Ron Durham, Burlington Indians	38
3B	Art López, Greensboro Yankees	12
HR	Walt Matthews, Durham Bulls	30
RBI	Jim Price, Kinston Eagles	109
SB	Johnny Parker, Burlington Indians	41

=== Pitching leaders ===
Stat	Player	Total
W	Chuck Kovach, Burlington Indians; Jerry Merz, Rocky Mount Leafs	17
ERA	James Horsford, Greensboro Yankees	1.41
CG	Luis Tiant, Burlington Indians	17
SHO	Luis Tiant, Burlington Indians	6
SO	Luis Tiant, Burlington Indians	207
IP	Don Flynn, Rocky Mount Leafs	211.0

== Playoffs ==
- The Wilson Tobs won their third Carolina League championship, defeating the Greensboro Yankees in three games.
- The final series was reduced from a best-of-seven series to a best-of-three series. The semi-finals remained a best-of-five series.

=== Playoff bracket ===
Semi-finals
E1	Kinston	0
E2	Wilson	3
W1	Greensboro	3
W2	Durham	2

Finals
E2	Wilson	2
W1	Greensboro	1

== Awards ==
Carolina League awards
Award name	Recipient
Most Valuable Player	Jim Price, Kinston Eagles
Manager of the Year	Pat Colgan, Burlington Indians

== See also ==
- 1963 Major League Baseball season
