= 1965 Carolina League season =

- League: Carolina League
- Sport: Baseball
- Duration: April 16 – September 4
- Number of games: 144
- Number of teams: 10

Regular season
- Season MVP: Bobby Murcer, Greensboro Yankees

Playoffs
- League champions: Tidewater Tides
- Runners-up: Durham Bulls

CL seasons
- ← 1964 1966 →

The 1965 Carolina League was a Class A baseball season played between April 16 and September 4. Ten teams played a 144-game schedule, with the top two teams in each division qualifying for the post-season.

The Tidewater Tides won the Carolina League championship, defeating the Durham Bulls in the final round of the playoffs.

== Team changes ==
- The Burlington Indians ended their affiliation with the Cleveland Indians and began an affiliation with the Washington Senators. The club was renamed the Burlington Senators.
- The Rocky Mount Senators ended their affiliation with the Washington Senators and began an affiliation with the Detroit Tigers. The club was renamed the Rocky Mount Leafs.

== Teams ==
1965 Carolina League
Division	Team	City	MLB Affiliate	Stadium
East	Kinston Eagles	Kinston, North Carolina	Pittsburgh Pirates	Grainger Stadium
East	Peninsula Grays	Hampton, Virginia	Cincinnati Reds	War Memorial Stadium
East	Rocky Mount Leafs	Rocky Mount, North Carolina	Detroit Tigers	Municipal Stadium
East	Tidewater Tides	Norfolk, Virginia	Chicago White Sox	Frank D. Lawrence Stadium
East	Wilson Tobs	Wilson, North Carolina	Minnesota Twins	Fleming Stadium
West	Burlington Senators	Burlington, North Carolina	Washington Senators	Burlington Athletic Stadium
West	Durham Bulls	Durham, North Carolina	Houston Astros	Durham Athletic Park
West	Greensboro Yankees	Greensboro, North Carolina	New York Yankees	World War Memorial Stadium
West	Raleigh Cardinals	Raleigh, North Carolina	St. Louis Cardinals	Devereaux Meadow
West	Winston-Salem Red Sox	Winston-Salem, North Carolina	Boston Red Sox	Ernie Shore Field

== Map of teams ==
East division West division

== Regular season ==
=== Summary ===
- The Peninsula Grays finished with the best record in the league for the first time in team history.
- The regular season schedule was expanded from 140-games to 144-games.

=== Standings ===
East division
Team	Win	Loss	%	GB
Peninsula Grays	86	58	.597	–
Tidewater Tides	76	68	.528	10
Kinston Eagles	72	71	.503	13.5
Wilson Tobs	68	75	.476	17.5
Rocky Mount Leafs	62	82	.431	24
West division
Durham Bulls	83	60	.580	–
Greensboro Yankees	79	65	.549	4.5
Winston-Salem Red Sox	65	79	.451	18.5
Raleigh Cardinals	64	79	.448	19
Burlington Senators	63	81	.438	20.5

== League Leaders ==
=== Batting leaders ===
Stat	Player	Total
AVG	Ed Stroud, Tidewater Tides	.341
H	Teolindo Acosta, Peninsula Grays	167
R	Sam Thompson, Peninsula Grays	121
2B	Tony Torchia, Winston-Salem Red Sox	31
3B	Frank Coggins, Burlington Senators	11
HR	Mike Derrick, Kinston Eagles	28
RBI	Mike Derrick, Kinston Eagles	103
SB	Sam Thompson, Peninsula Grays	64

=== Pitching leaders ===
Stat	Player	Total
W	Wayne McAlpin, Wilson Tobs; Jim Morio, Peninsula Grays	16
ERA	Jimmie Brown, Rocky Mount Leafs	1.81
CG	Marvin Dutt, Durham Bulls; Dock Ellis, Kinston Eagles; Jim Morio, Peninsula Grays	15
SHO	Jimmie Brown, Rocky Mount Leafs; Wayne McAlpin, Wilson Tobs; Norbert Rodgers, Tidewater Tides	6
SO	Ernest Barron, Wilson Tobs	202
IP	Wayne McAlpin, Wilson Tobs	205.0

== Playoffs ==
- The Tidewater Tides won their first Carolina League championship, defeating the Durham Bulls in two games.

=== Playoff bracket ===
Semi-finals
E1	Peninsula	1
E2	Tidewater	2
W1	Durham	2
W2	Greensboro	1

Finals
E2	Tidewater	2
W1	Durham	0

== Awards ==
Carolina League awards
Award name	Recipient
Most Valuable Player	Bobby Murcer, Greensboro Yankees
Manager of the Year	Pinky May, Peninsula Grays

== See also ==
- 1965 Major League Baseball season
