= 1966 Carolina League season =

- League: Carolina League
- Sport: Baseball
- Duration: April 15 – September 5
- Number of games: 140
- Number of teams: 11

Regular season
- Season MVP: Robbie Snow, Winston-Salem Red Sox

Playoffs
- League champions: Rocky Mount Leafs
- Runners-up: Winston-Salem Red Sox

CL seasons
- ← 1965 1967 →

The 1966 Carolina League was a Class A baseball season played between April 15 and September 5. Eleven teams played a 140-game schedule, with the top two teams in each division qualifying for the post-season.

The Rocky Mount Leafs won the Carolina League championship, defeating the Winston-Salem Red Sox in the final round of the playoffs.

== Team changes ==
- The Lynchburg White Sox join the Carolina League from the Southern League. The club is affiliated with the Chicago White Sox.
- The Kinston Eagles ended their affiliation with the Pittsburgh Pirates and began an affiliation with the Atlanta Braves.
- The Raleigh Cardinals ended their affiliation with the St. Louis Cardinals and began an affiliation with the Pittsburgh Pirates. The club was renamed the Raleigh Pirates.
- The Tidewater Tides ended their affiliation with the Chicago White Sox and began an affiliation with the Philadelphia Phillies.

== Teams ==
1966 Carolina League
| Division | Team | City | MLB Affiliate | Stadium |
| East | Kinston Eagles | Kinston, North Carolina | Atlanta Braves | Grainger Stadium |
| East | Peninsula Grays | Hampton, Virginia | Cincinnati Reds | War Memorial Stadium |
| East | Rocky Mount Leafs | Rocky Mount, North Carolina | Detroit Tigers | Municipal Stadium |
| East | Tidewater Tides | Norfolk, Virginia | Philadelphia Phillies | Frank D. Lawrence Stadium |
| East | Wilson Tobs | Wilson, North Carolina | Minnesota Twins | Fleming Stadium |
| West | Burlington Senators | Burlington, North Carolina | Washington Senators | Burlington Athletic Stadium |
| West | Durham Bulls | Durham, North Carolina | Houston Astros | Durham Athletic Park |
| West | Greensboro Yankees | Greensboro, North Carolina | New York Yankees | World War Memorial Stadium |
| West | Lynchburg White Sox | Lynchburg, Virginia | Chicago White Sox | City Stadium |
| West | Raleigh Pirates | Raleigh, North Carolina | Pittsburgh Pirates | Devereaux Meadow |
| West | Winston-Salem Red Sox | Winston-Salem, North Carolina | Boston Red Sox | Ernie Shore Field |

== Map of teams ==
East division West division

== Regular season ==
=== Summary ===
- The Winston-Salem Red Sox finished with the best record in the league for the first time since 1964.
- The regular season schedule was shortened from 144-games to 140-games.

=== Standings ===
East division
| Team | Win | Loss | % | GB |
|---|---|---|---|---|
| Kinston Eagles | 76 | 63 | .547 | – |
| Rocky Mount Leafs | 72 | 63 | .533 | 2 |
| Wilson Tobs | 72 | 65 | .526 | 3 |
| Peninsula Grays | 63 | 75 | .457 | 12.5 |
| Tidewater Tides | 58 | 81 | .417 | 18 |
West division
| Winston-Salem Red Sox | 82 | 58 | .586 | – |
| Burlington Senators | 76 | 62 | .551 | 5 |
| Raleigh Pirates | 71 | 66 | .518 | 9.5 |
| Lynchburg White Sox | 64 | 75 | .460 | 17.5 |
| Greensboro Yankees | 64 | 76 | .457 | 18 |
| Durham Bulls | 62 | 76 | .449 | 19 |

== League Leaders ==
=== Batting leaders ===
| Stat | Player | Total |
|---|---|---|
| AVG | Jose Calero, Winston-Salem Red Sox | .330 |
| H | Alberto Cambero, Kinston Eagles | 170 |
| R | Alberto Cambero, Kinston Eagles | 115 |
| 2B | Bernie Carbo, Peninsula Grays | 30 |
| 3B | Harvey Yancey, Peninsula Grays | 11 |
| HR | Barry Morgan, Kinston Eagles | 28 |
| RBI | Barry Morgan, Kinston Eagles | 104 |
| SB | Edward Griffiths, Burlington Senators | 40 |

=== Pitching leaders ===
| Stat | Player | Total |
|---|---|---|
| W | Robbie Snow, Winston-Salem Red Sox | 20 |
| ERA | Robbie Snow, Winston-Salem Red Sox | 1.75 |
| CG | Ron Klimkowski, Winston-Salem Red Sox | 20 |
| SHO | Dick Drago, Rocky Mount Leafs | 7 |
| SO | Wally Wolf, Peninsula Grays | 185 |
| IP | Ron Klimkowski, Winston-Salem Red Sox | 221.0 |

== Playoffs ==
- The Rocky Mount Leafs won their first Carolina League championship, defeating the Winston-Salem Red Sox in two games.

=== Playoff bracket ===
Semi-finals
E1 | Kinston | 0
E2 | Rocky Mount | 2
W1 | Winston-Salem | 2
W2 | Burlington | 0

Finals
E2 | Rocky Mount | 2
W1 | Winston-Salem | 0

== Awards ==
Carolina League awards
| Award name | Recipient |
|---|---|
| Most Valuable Player | Robbie Snow, Winston-Salem Red Sox |
| Manager of the Year | Joe Morgan, Raleigh Pirates |

== See also ==
- 1966 Major League Baseball season
