= 1964 Carolina League season =

- League: Carolina League
- Sport: Baseball
- Duration: April 17 – September 3
- Number of games: 140
- Number of teams: 10

Regular season
- Season MVP: Ed Stroud, Tidewater Tides

Playoffs
- League champions: Winston-Salem Red Sox
- Runners-up: Tidewater Tides

CL seasons
- ← 1963 1965 →

The 1964 Carolina League was a Class A baseball season played between April 17 and September 3. Ten teams played a 140-game schedule, with the top two teams in each division qualifying for the post-season.

The Winston-Salem Red Sox won the Carolina League championship, defeating the Tidewater Tides in the final round of the playoffs.

== Team changes ==
- The Peninsula Senators ended their affiliation with the Washington Senators and began an affiliation with the Cincinnati Reds. The club was renamed the Peninsula Grays.
- The Raleigh Mets ended their affiliation with the New York Mets and began an affiliation with the St. Louis Cardinals. The club was renamed the Raleigh Cardinals.
- The Rocky Mount Leafs ended their affiliation with the Cincinnati Reds and began an affiliation with the Washington Senators. The club was renamed the Rocky Mount Senators.
- The Tidewater Tides began an affiliation with the Chicago White Sox.

== Teams ==
1964 Carolina League
| Division | Team | City | MLB Affiliate | Stadium |
| East | Kinston Eagles | Kinston, North Carolina | Pittsburgh Pirates | Grainger Stadium |
| East | Peninsula Grays | Hampton, Virginia | Cincinnati Reds | War Memorial Stadium |
| East | Rocky Mount Senators | Rocky Mount, North Carolina | Washington Senators | Municipal Stadium |
| East | Tidewater Tides | Norfolk, Virginia | Chicago White Sox | Frank D. Lawrence Stadium |
| East | Wilson Tobs | Wilson, North Carolina | Minnesota Twins | Fleming Stadium |
| West | Burlington Indians | Burlington, North Carolina | Cleveland Indians | Burlington Athletic Stadium |
| West | Durham Bulls | Durham, North Carolina | Houston Colt .45s | Durham Athletic Park |
| West | Greensboro Yankees | Greensboro, North Carolina | New York Yankees | World War Memorial Stadium |
| West | Raleigh Cardinals | Raleigh, North Carolina | St. Louis Cardinals | Devereaux Meadow |
| West | Winston-Salem Red Sox | Winston-Salem, North Carolina | Boston Red Sox | Ernie Shore Field |

== Map of teams ==
East division West division

== Regular season ==
=== Summary ===
- The Winston-Salem Red Sox finished with the best record in the league for the first time since 1950.
- The regular season schedule was reduced from 144-games to 140-games.

=== Standings ===
East division
| Team | Win | Loss | % | GB |
|---|---|---|---|---|
| Kinston Eagles | 79 | 59 | .572 | – |
| Tidewater Tides | 75 | 63 | .543 | 4 |
| Peninsula Grays | 61 | 76 | .445 | 17.5 |
| Rocky Mount Senators | 61 | 77 | .442 | 18 |
| Wilson Tobs | 57 | 82 | .410 | 22.5 |
West division
| Winston-Salem Red Sox | 82 | 57 | .590 | – |
| Greensboro Yankees | 76 | 61 | .555 | 5 |
| Raleigh Cardinals | 76 | 62 | .551 | 5.5 |
| Burlington Indians | 68 | 70 | .493 | 13.5 |
| Durham Bulls | 54 | 82 | .397 | 26.5 |

== League Leaders ==
=== Batting leaders ===
| Stat | Player | Total |
|---|---|---|
| AVG | Mike Page, Winston-Salem Red Sox | .344 |
| H | Ed Stroud, Tidewater Tides | 167 |
| R | Ed Stroud, Tidewater Tides | 108 |
| 2B | Chris Coletta, Winston-Salem Red Sox | 32 |
| 3B | Sam Parrilla, Burlington Indians | 14 |
| HR | Edwin Chasteen, Raleigh Cardinals | 28 |
| RBI | Steve Whitaker, Greensboro Yankees | 100 |
| SB | Ed Stroud, Tidewater Tides | 72 |

=== Pitching leaders ===
| Stat | Player | Total |
|---|---|---|
| W | Donald Hagen, Raleigh Cardinals | 16 |
| ERA | Gary Waslewski, Kinston Eagles | 1.64 |
| CG | Pete Craig, Rocky Mount Senators | 20 |
| SHO | Donald Hagen, Raleigh Cardinals; Rudy May, Tidewater Tides; John Thibdeau, Winston-Salem Red Sox; Gary Waslewski, Kinston Eagles | 4 |
| SO | Donald Hagen, Raleigh Cardinals | 202 |
| IP | Pete Craig, Rocky Mount Senators | 208.0 |

== Playoffs ==
- The Winston-Salem Red Sox won their third Carolina League championship, defeating the Tidewater Tides in three games.
- The semi-finals was reduced from a best-of-five series to a best-of-three series.

=== Playoff bracket ===
Semi-finals
E1 | Kinston | 0
E2 | Tidewater | 2
W1 | Winston-Salem | 2
W2 | Greensboro | 0

Finals
E2 | Tidewater | 0
W1 | Winston-Salem | 2

== Awards ==
Carolina League awards
| Award name | Recipient |
|---|---|
| Most Valuable Player | Ed Stroud, Tidewater Tides |
| Manager of the Year | Bill Slack, Winston-Salem Red Sox |

== See also ==
- 1964 Major League Baseball season
