= 1967 Carolina League season =

- League: Carolina League
- Sport: Baseball
- Duration: April 14 – September 4
- Games: 144
- Teams: 12

Regular season
- Season MVP: Don Money, Raleigh Pirates

Playoffs
- League champions: Durham Bulls
- Runners-up: Tidewater Tides

CL seasons
- ← 1966 1968 →

The 1967 Carolina League was a Class A baseball season played between April 14 and September 4. Twelve teams played a 144-game schedule, with the top four teams in each division qualifying for the post-season.

The Durham Bulls won the Carolina League championship, defeating the Tidewater Tides in the final round of the playoffs.

== Team changes ==
- The Asheville Tourists join the Carolina League from the Southern League. The club is affiliated with the Houston Astros.
- The Raleigh Pirates switch from the West Division to the East Division.
- The Durham Bulls ended their affiliation with the Houston Astros and began a new affiliation with the New York Mets.
- The Peninsula Grays ended their affiliation with the Cincinnati Reds and began a new affiliation with the Kansas City Athletics.

== Teams ==
1967 Carolina League
Division	Team	City	MLB Affiliate	Stadium
East	Kinston Eagles	Kinston, North Carolina	Atlanta Braves	Grainger Stadium
East	Peninsula Grays	Hampton, Virginia	Kansas City Athletics	War Memorial Stadium
East	Raleigh Pirates	Raleigh, North Carolina	Pittsburgh Pirates	Devereaux Meadow
East	Rocky Mount Leafs	Rocky Mount, North Carolina	Detroit Tigers	Municipal Stadium
East	Tidewater Tides	Norfolk, Virginia	Philadelphia Phillies	Frank D. Lawrence Stadium
East	Wilson Tobs	Wilson, North Carolina	Minnesota Twins	Fleming Stadium
West	Asheville Tourists	Asheville, North Carolina	Houston Astros	McCormick Field
West	Burlington Senators	Burlington, North Carolina	Washington Senators	Burlington Athletic Stadium
West	Durham Bulls	Durham, North Carolina	New York Mets	Durham Athletic Park
West	Greensboro Yankees	Greensboro, North Carolina	New York Yankees	World War Memorial Stadium
West	Lynchburg White Sox	Lynchburg, Virginia	Chicago White Sox	City Stadium
West	Winston-Salem Red Sox	Winston-Salem, North Carolina	Boston Red Sox	Ernie Shore Field

== Map of teams ==
East division West division

== Regular season ==
=== Summary ===
- The Raleigh Pirates finished with the best record in the league for the first time since 1959.
- The playoffs are expanded to the top four teams in each division.

=== Standings ===
East division
Team	Win	Loss	%	GB
Raleigh Pirates	77	65	.542	–
Peninsula Grays	74	64	.536	1
Rocky Mount Leafs	74	68	.521	3
Tidewater Tides	70	68	.507	5
Wilson Tobs	61	72	.459	11.5
Kinston Eagles	60	75	.444	13.5
West division
Durham Bulls	74	64	.536	–
Winston-Salem Red Sox	69	68	.504	4.5
Burlington Senators	70	69	.504	4.5
Lynchburg White Sox	68	68	.500	5
Greensboro Yankees	66	72	.478	8
Asheville Tourists	64	74	.464	10

== League Leaders ==
=== Batting leaders ===
Stat	Player	Total
AVG	Duncan Campbell, Raleigh Pirates	.331
H	Van Kelly, Kinston Eagles	161
R	Danny Greenfield, Peninsula Grays	93
2B	Don Money, Raleigh Pirates	37
3B	Joe Sparks, Lynchburg White Sox	9
HR	Hal King, Asheville Tourists	30
RBI	Ron Allen, Tidewater Tides	100
SB	Fred Wolcott, Winston-Salem Red Sox	49

=== Pitching leaders ===
Stat	Player	Total
W	Harold Clem, Raleigh Pirates; Mike Daniel, Asheville Tourists; Gary Jones, Greensboro Yankees; Jon Warden, Rocky Mount Leafs	15
ERA	Harold Clem, Raleigh Pirates	1.64
CG	Luis Penalver, Burlington Senators	15
SHO	Bill Butler, Rocky Mount Leafs; Gary Jones, Greensboro Yankees; Jerry Wild, Durham Bulls	6
SO	Mark Schaeffer, Winston-Salem Red Sox	226
IP	Jon Warden, Rocky Mount Leafs	219.0

== Playoffs ==
- The Durham Bulls won their second Carolina League championship, defeating the Tidewater Tides in three games.
- The quarter-finals was a single knockout game, followed by a best-of-three in each the semi-finals and finals.

=== Playoff bracket ===
Quarter-finals
E1	Raleigh	1
E3	Rocky Mount	0
E2	Peninsula	0
E4	Tidewater	1
W1	Durham	1
W3	Burlington	0
W2	Winston-Salem	0
W4	Lynchburg	1

Semi-finals
E1	Raleigh	0
E4	Tidewater	2
W1	Durham	2
W4	Lynchburg	0

Finals
E4	Tidewater	1
W1	Durham	2

== Awards ==
Carolina League awards
Award name	Recipient
Most Valuable Player	Don Money, Raleigh Pirates
Manager of the Year	Clyde McCullough, Durham Bulls

== See also ==
- 1967 Major League Baseball season
