= 1962 Carolina League season =

- League: Carolina League
- Sport: Baseball
- Duration: April 24 – September 9
- Number of games: 140
- Number of teams: 8

Regular season
- Season MVP: Rusty Staub, Durham Bulls

Playoffs
- League champions: Kinston Eagles
- Runners-up: Durham Bulls

CL seasons
- ← 1961 1963 →

The 1962 Carolina League was a Class B baseball season played between April 24 and September 9. Eight teams played a 140-game schedule, with the top four teams qualifying for the post-season.

The Kinston Eagles won the Carolina League championship, defeating the Durham Bulls in the final round of the playoffs.

== Team changes ==
- The Kinston Eagles joined the league as an expansion team. The club begins an affiliation with the Pittsburgh Pirates.
- The Rocky Mount Leafs joined the league as an expansion team. The club begins an affiliation with the Cincinnati Reds.
- The Durham Bulls ended their affiliation with the Detroit Tigers and begins a new affiliation with the Houston Colt .45s. The team was renamed the Winston-Salem Red Sox.
- The Raleigh Capitals began an affiliation with the Washington Senators.

== Teams ==
1962 Carolina League
Team	City	MLB Affiliate	Stadium
Burlington Indians	Burlington, North Carolina	Cleveland Indians	Burlington Athletic Stadium
Durham Bulls	Durham, North Carolina	Houston Colt .45s	Durham Athletic Park
Greensboro Yankees	Greensboro, North Carolina	New York Yankees	World War Memorial Stadium
Kinston Eagles	Kinston, North Carolina	Pittsburgh Pirates	Grainger Stadium
Raleigh Capitals	Raleigh, North Carolina	Washington Senators	Devereaux Meadow
Rocky Mount Leafs	Rocky Mount, North Carolina	Cincinnati Reds	Municipal Stadium
Wilson Tobs	Wilson, North Carolina	Minnesota Twins	Fleming Stadium
Winston-Salem Red Sox	Winston-Salem, North Carolina	Boston Red Sox	Ernie Shore Field

== Map of teams ==
Carolina League Teams

== Regular season ==
=== Summary ===
- The Durham Bulls finished with the best record in the league for the first time since 1957.

=== Standings ===
Carolina League
Team	Win	Loss	%	GB
Durham Bulls	89	51	.636	–
Kinston Eagles	83	57	.593	6
Winston-Salem Red Sox	76	64	.543	13
Burlington Indians	66	74	.471	23
Greensboro Yankees	65	75	.464	24
Wilson Tobs	65	75	.464	24
Rocky Mount Leafs	60	80	.429	29
Raleigh Capitals	56	84	.400	33

== League Leaders ==
=== Batting leaders ===
Stat	Player	Total
AVG	César Tovar, Rocky Mount Leafs	.329
H	Ronnie Flender, Rocky Mount Leafs; César Tovar, Rocky Mount Leafs	168
R	Rusty Staub, Durham Bulls; César Tovar, Rocky Mount Leafs	121
2B	César Tovar, Rocky Mount Leafs	35
3B	Augie Garrido, Burlington Indians	12
HR	Bert Barth, Rocky Mount Leafs	33
RBI	Bert Barth, Rocky Mount Leafs	136
SB	César Tovar, Rocky Mount Leafs	56

=== Pitching leaders ===
Stat	Player	Total
W	Frank Bork, Kinston Eagles	19
ERA	Steve Blass, Kinston Eagles	1.97
CG	Frank Bork, Kinston Eagles	18
SHO	Steve Blass, Kinston Eagles	8
SO	Steve Blass, Kinston Eagles	209
IP	Mel Stottlemyre, Greensboro Yankees	241.0

== Playoffs ==
- The Kinston Eagles won their first Carolina League championship, defeating the Durham Bulls in seven games.
- With the return of the playoffs this season, the semi-finals were a best-of-three season and the finals were a best-of-seven series.

=== Playoff bracket ===
Semi-finals
1	Durham	2
4	Burlington	0
2	Kinston	2
3	Winston-Salem	1

Finals
1	Durham	3
2	Kinston	4

== Awards ==
Carolina League awards
Award name	Recipient
Most Valuable Player	Rusty Staub, Durham Bulls
Manager of the Year	Lou Fitzgerald, Durham Bulls

== See also ==
- 1962 Major League Baseball season
