= 1960 Carolina League season =

- League: Carolina League
- Sport: Baseball
- Duration: April 19 – September 5
- Number of games: 140
- Number of teams: 6

Regular season
- Season MVP: Ed Olivares, Winston-Salem Red Birds

Playoffs
- League champions: Greensboro Yankees
- Runners-up: Burlington Indians

CL seasons
- ← 1959 1961 →

The 1960 Carolina League was a Class B baseball season played between April 19 and September 5. Six teams played a 140-game schedule, with the winner of each half of the season qualifying for the league finals.

The Greensboro Yankees won the Carolina League championship, defeating the Burlington Indians in the final round of the playoffs.

== Team changes ==
The Wilson Tobs ended their affiliation with the Pittsburgh Pirates and began a new affiliation with the Washington Senators.

== Teams ==
1960 Carolina League
Team	City	MLB Affiliate	Stadium
Burlington Indians	Burlington, North Carolina	Cleveland Indians	Burlington Athletic Stadium
Durham Bulls	Durham, North Carolina	Detroit Tigers	Durham Athletic Park
Greensboro Yankees	Greensboro, North Carolina	New York Yankees	World War Memorial Stadium
Raleigh Capitals	Raleigh, North Carolina	Boston Red Sox	Devereaux Meadow
Wilson Tobs	Wilson, North Carolina	Washington Senators	Fleming Stadium
Winston-Salem Red Birds	Winston-Salem, North Carolina	St. Louis Cardinals	Ernie Shore Field

== Map of teams ==
Carolina League Teams

== Regular season ==
=== Summary ===
- The Greensboro Yankees finished with the best record in the league for the first time.
- The regular season schedule was lengthened from 130-games to 140-games.
- The regular season was split in half, with the winners of both halves qualifying for the league finals.

=== Standings ===
Carolina League
Team	Win	Loss	%	GB
Greensboro Yankees	84	55	.604	–
Wilson Tobs	73	65	.529	10.5
Raleigh Capitals	70	65	.519	12
Burlington Indians	67	73	.479	17.5
Winston-Salem Red Birds	61	76	.445	22
Durham Bulls	57	78	.422	25

== League Leaders ==
=== Batting leaders ===
Stat	Player	Total
AVG	Rich Rollins, Wilson Tobs	.341
H	Joseph Teague, Burlington Indians	164
R	James Orton, Greensboro Yankees	101
2B	Ed Gray, Greensboro Yankees; John Roth, Winston-Salem Red Birds	29
3B	Don Wert, Durham Bulls	12
HR	Ed Olivares, Winston-Salem Red Birds	35
RBI	Ed Olivares, Winston-Salem Red Birds	125
SB	Mitchell June, Burlington Indians	26

=== Pitching leaders ===
Stat	Player	Total
W	Lee Stange, Wilson Tobs	20
ERA	Daniel Wooden, Raleigh Capitals	2.15
CG	Lee Stange, Wilson Tobs	20
SHO	Johnnie Seale, Durham Bulls; Lee Stange, Wilson Tobs	3
SO	Johnnie Seale, Durham Bulls	197
IP	Lee Stange, Wilson Tobs	251.0

== Playoffs ==
- The Greensboro Yankees won their first Carolina League championship, defeating the Burlington Indians in five games.

=== Playoff bracket ===
Finals
1	Greensboro	4
2	Burlington	1

== Awards ==
Carolina League awards
Award name	Recipient
Most Valuable Player	Ed Olivares, Winston-Salem Red Birds
Manager of the Year	Pinky May, Burlington Indians

== See also ==
- 1960 Major League Baseball season
