= 1956 Carolina League season =

- League: Carolina League
- Sport: Baseball
- Duration: April 17 – September 3
- Number of games: 154
- Number of teams: 8

Regular season
- Season MVP: Curt Flood, High Point-Thomasville Hi-Toms

Playoffs
- League champions: Fayetteville Highlanders
- Runners-up: Danville Leafs

CL seasons
- ← 1955 1957 →

The 1956 Carolina League was a Class B baseball season played between April 17 and September 3. Eight teams played a 154-game schedule, with the top four teams qualifying for the post-season.

The Fayetteville Highlanders won the Carolina League championship, defeating the Danville Leafs in the final round of the playoffs.

== Team changes ==
- The Burlington-Graham Pirates relocated to Kinston, North Carolina, and were renamed the Kinston Eagles. The club remained affiliated with the Pittsburgh Pirates.
- The Reidsville Phillies relocated to Wilson, North Carolina, and were renamed the Wilson Tobs.
- The Fayetteville Highlanders ended their affiliation with the Baltimore Orioles and began an affiliation with the Cleveland Indians.

== Teams ==
1956 Carolina League
Team	City	MLB Affiliate	Stadium
Danville Leafs	Danville, Virginia	New York Giants	League Park
Durham Bulls	Durham, North Carolina	Detroit Tigers	Durham Athletic Park
Fayetteville Highlanders	Fayetteville, North Carolina	Cleveland Indians	Pittman Stadium
Greensboro Patriots	Greensboro, North Carolina	Boston Red Sox	World War Memorial Stadium
High Point-Thomasville Hi-Toms	Thomasville, North Carolina	Cincinnati Redlegs	Finch Field
Kinston Eagles	Kinston, North Carolina	Pittsburgh Pirates	Grainger Stadium
Wilson Tobs	Wilson, North Carolina	Philadelphia Phillies	Fleming Stadium
Winston-Salem Twins	Winston-Salem, North Carolina	New York Yankees	Ernie Shore Field

== Map of teams ==
Carolina League Teams

== Regular season ==
=== Summary ===
- The High Point-Thomasville Hi-Toms finished with the best record in the regular season for the second consecutive season.
- The regular season schedule is lengthened from 140-games to 154-games.

=== Standings ===
Carolina League
Team	Win	Loss	%	GB
High Point-Thomasville Hi-Toms	91	63	.591	–
Durham Bulls	84	69	.549	6.5
Danville Leafs	83	69	.546	7
Fayetteville Highlanders	78	71	.523	10.5
Greensboro Patriots	75	79	.487	16
Wilson Tobs	72	79	.477	17.5
Kinston Eagles	66	87	.431	24.5
Winston-Salem Twins	59	91	.393	30

== League Leaders ==
=== Batting leaders ===
Stat	Player	Total
AVG	Curt Flood, High Point-Thomasville Hi-Toms	.340
H	George Contratto, Greensboro Patriots; Curt Flood, High Point-Thomasville Hi-Toms	190
R	Curt Flood, High Point-Thomasville Hi-Toms	133
2B	Willie McCovey, Danville Leafs	38
3B	Dale Ferris, Durham Bulls	10
HR	Leon Wagner, Danville Leafs	51
RBI	Leon Wagner, Danville Leafs	166
SB	Bill Kallas, Fayetteville Highlanders	35

=== Pitching leaders ===
Stat	Player	Total
W	Jack Taylor, High Point-Thomasville Hi-Toms	22
ERA	Kenneth Deal, Greensboro Patriots	2.19
CG	Jack Taylor, High Point-Thomasville Hi-Toms	28
SHO	Woody Rich, High Point-Thomasville Hi-Toms; Jack Taylor, High Point-Thomasville Hi-Toms; Albert Wilson, Danville Leafs	4
SO	Earl Hunsinger, Wilson Tobs	232
IP	Jack Taylor, High Point-Thomasville Hi-Toms	289.0

== Playoffs ==
- The Fayetteville Highlanders won their second Carolina League championship in three seasons, defeating the Danville Leafs in six games.
- The semi-finals were reduced from a best-of-seven series to a best-of-five series.

=== Playoff bracket ===
Semi-finals
1	High Point-Thomasville	0
4	Fayetteville	3
2	Durham	1
3	Danville	3

Finals
4	Fayetteville	4
3	Danville	2

== Awards ==
Carolina League awards
Award name	Recipient
Most Valuable Player	Curt Flood, High Point-Thomasville Hi-Toms
Manager of the Year	Johnny Pesky, Durham Bulls

== See also ==
- 1956 Major League Baseball season
