= 1961 Carolina League season =

- League: Carolina League
- Sport: Baseball
- Duration: April 18 – September 4
- Number of games: 140
- Number of teams: 6

Regular season
- Season MVP: Chuck Weatherspoon, Wilson Tobs

Playoffs
- League champions: Wilson Tobs

CL seasons
- ← 1960 1962 →

The 1961 Carolina League was a Class B baseball season played between April 18 and September 4. Six teams played a 140-game schedule, with the winner of each half of the season qualifying for the league finals.

The Wilson Tobs won the Carolina League championship, as they finished in first place in both halves of the season.

== Team changes ==
- The Raleigh Capitals ended their affiliation with the Boston Red Sox.
- The Winston-Salem Red Birds ended their affiliation with the St. Louis Cardinals and began a new affiliation with the Boston Red Sox. The team was renamed the Winston-Salem Red Sox.

== Teams ==
1961 Carolina League
Team	City	MLB Affiliate	Stadium
Burlington Indians	Burlington, North Carolina	Cleveland Indians	Burlington Athletic Stadium
Durham Bulls	Durham, North Carolina	Detroit Tigers	Durham Athletic Park
Greensboro Yankees	Greensboro, North Carolina	New York Yankees	World War Memorial Stadium
Raleigh Capitals	Raleigh, North Carolina	None	Devereaux Meadow
Wilson Tobs	Wilson, North Carolina	Minnesota Twins	Fleming Stadium
Winston-Salem Red Sox	Winston-Salem, North Carolina	Boston Red Sox	Ernie Shore Field

== Map of teams ==
Carolina League Teams

== Regular season ==
=== Summary ===
- The Wilson Tobs finished with the best record in the league for the first time.

=== Standings ===
Carolina League
Team	Win	Loss	%	GB
Wilson Tobs	83	56	.597	–
Burlington Indians	71	66	.518	11
Greensboro Yankees	70	68	.507	12.5
Winston-Salem Red Sox	68	72	.486	15.5
Durham Bulls	65	73	.471	17.5
Raleigh Capitals	58	80	.420	24.5

== League Leaders ==
=== Batting leaders ===
Stat	Player	Total
AVG	Gates Brown, Durham Bulls	.324
H	Ike Futch, Greensboro Yankees	164
R	Chuck Weatherspoon, Wilson Tobs	121
2B	Duke Sims, Burlington Indians	36
3B	Bob Immediato, Burlington Indians	10
HR	Chuck Weatherspoon, Wilson Tobs	31
RBI	Chuck Weatherspoon, Wilson Tobs	123
SB	Chico Salmon, Durham Bulls	38

=== Pitching leaders ===
Stat	Player	Total
W	Al Eisele, Burlington Indians; William Jones, Wilson Tobs; Billy MacLeod, Winston-Salem Red Sox; Ed Merritt, Greensboro Yankees	15
ERA	Billy MacLeod, Winston-Salem Red Sox	2.31
CG	Billy MacLeod, Winston-Salem Red Sox; Ed Merritt, Greensboro Yankees	15
SHO	Norman Forsythe, Greensboro Yankees; Richard Klunder, Durham Bulls	3
SO	Billy MacLeod, Winston-Salem Red Sox	208
IP	Ed Merritt, Greensboro Yankees	211.1

== Playoffs ==
- The Wilson Tobs won their second Carolina League championship, as they won both halves of the season.

== Awards ==
Carolina League awards
Award name	Recipient
Most Valuable Player	Chuck Weatherspoon, Wilson Tobs
Manager of the Year	Jack McKeon, Wilson Tobs

== See also ==
- 1961 Major League Baseball season
