= 1959 Carolina League season =

- League: Carolina League
- Sport: Baseball
- Duration: April 21 – August 28
- Games: 130
- Teams: 6

Regular season
- Season MVP: Carl Yastrzemski, Raleigh Capitals

Playoffs
- League champions: Wilson Tobs
- Runners-up: Raleigh Capitals

CL seasons
- ← 1958 1960 →

The 1959 Carolina League was a Class B baseball season played between April 17 and August 28. Six teams played a 130-game schedule, with the top four teams qualifying for the post-season.

The Wilson Tobs won the Carolina League championship, defeating the Raleigh Capitals in the final round of the playoffs.

== Team changes ==
- The Danville Leafs fold.
- The High Point-Thomasville Hi-Toms fold.
- The Wilson Tobs ended their affiliation with the Baltimore Orioles and began a new affiliation with the Pittsburgh Pirates.

== Teams ==
1959 Carolina League
Team	City	MLB Affiliate	Stadium
Burlington Indians	Burlington, North Carolina	Cleveland Indians	Graham High School
Durham Bulls	Durham, North Carolina	Detroit Tigers	Durham Athletic Park
Greensboro Yankees	Greensboro, North Carolina	New York Yankees	World War Memorial Stadium
Raleigh Capitals	Raleigh, North Carolina	Boston Red Sox	Devereaux Meadow
Wilson Tobs	Wilson, North Carolina	Pittsburgh Pirates	Fleming Stadium
Winston-Salem Red Birds	Winston-Salem, North Carolina	St. Louis Cardinals	Ernie Shore Field

== Map of teams ==
Carolina League Teams

== Regular season ==
=== Summary ===
- The Raleigh Capitals finished with the best record in the league for the first time since 1953.
- The regular season schedule was reduced from 140-games to 130-games.

=== Standings ===
Carolina League
Team	Win	Loss	%	GB
Raleigh Capitals	78	52	.600	–
Wilson Tobs	71	58	.550	6.5
Durham Bulls	70	60	.538	8
Winston-Salem Red Birds	67	62	.519	10.5
Greensboro Yankees	54	76	.415	24
Burlington Indians	49	81	.377	29

== League Leaders ==
=== Batting leaders ===
Stat	Player	Total
AVG	Carl Yastrzemski, Raleigh Capitals	.377
H	Carl Yastrzemski, Raleigh Capitals	170
R	Don Lock, Greensboro Yankees	102
2B	Carl Yastrzemski, Raleigh Capitals	34
3B	Leo Smith, Durham Bulls	9
HR	Don Lock, Greensboro Yankees	30
RBI	Don Lock, Greensboro Yankees	122
SB	Elder White, Wilson Tobs	35

=== Pitching leaders ===
Stat	Player	Total
W	Donald Dobrino, Wilson Tobs; Bill Spanswick, Raleigh Capitals	15
ERA	Phillip Kliewer, Durham Bulls	2.09
CG	Frank Carpin, Greensboro Yankees	14
SHO	Jim Weaver, Burlington Indians	4
SO	Bob Veale, Wilson Tobs	187
IP	Sam McIntyre, Winston-Salem Red Birds	196.0

== Playoffs ==
- The Wilson Tobs won their first Carolina League championship, defeating the Raleigh Capitals in four games.
- The semi-finals were extended from a best-of-three series to a best-of-five series.
- The finals were extended from a best-of-three series to a best-of-five series.
- The Raleigh Capitals and Winston-Salem Red Birds series was shortened to a best-of-three series due to poor weather conditions.

=== Playoff bracket ===
Semi-finals
1	Raleigh	2
4	Winston-Salem	0
2	Wilson	3
3	Durham	0

Finals
1	Raleigh	0
2	Wilson	4

== Awards ==
Carolina League awards
Award name	Recipient
Most Valuable Player	Carl Yastrzemski, Raleigh Capitals
Manager of the Year	Ken Deal, Raleigh Capitals

== See also ==
- 1959 Major League Baseball season
