= 1958 Carolina League season =

- League: Carolina League
- Sport: Baseball
- Duration: April 21 – September 6
- Number of games: 140
- Number of teams: 8

Regular season
- Season MVP: Fred Valentine, Wilson Tobs

Playoffs
- League champions: Burlington Indians
- Runners-up: Greensboro Yankees

CL seasons
- ← 1957 1959 →

The 1958 Carolina League was a Class B baseball season played between April 17 and September 2. Eight teams played a 140-game schedule, with the top four teams qualifying for the post-season.

The Burlington Indians won the Carolina League championship, defeating the Greensboro Yankees in the final round of the playoffs.

== Team changes ==
- The Burlington Indians join the league as an expansion team and begin an affiliation with the Cleveland Indians.
- The Greensboro Patriots ended their affiliation with the Boston Red Sox and began a new affiliation with the New York Yankees. The team is renamed the Greensboro Yankees.
- The Raleigh Capitals franchise is reactivated and begin an affiliation with the Boston Red Sox.
- The Wilson Tobs ended their affiliation with the Washington Senators and began a new affiliation with the Baltimore Orioles.

== Teams ==
1958 Carolina League
Team	City	MLB Affiliate	Stadium
Burlington Indians	Burlington, North Carolina	Cleveland Indians	Graham High School
Danville Leafs	Danville, Virginia	San Francisco Giants	League Park
Durham Bulls	Durham, North Carolina	Detroit Tigers	Durham Athletic Park
Greensboro Yankees	Greensboro, North Carolina	New York Yankees	World War Memorial Stadium
High Point-Thomasville Hi-Toms	Thomasville, North Carolina	Philadelphia Phillies	Finch Field
Raleigh Capitals	Raleigh, North Carolina	Boston Red Sox	Devereaux Meadow
Wilson Tobs	Wilson, North Carolina	Baltimore Orioles	Fleming Stadium
Winston-Salem Red Birds	Winston-Salem, North Carolina	St. Louis Cardinals	Ernie Shore Field

== Map of teams ==
Carolina League Teams

== Regular season ==
=== Summary ===
- The Danville Leafs finished with the best record in the league for the first time since 1949.

=== Standings ===
Carolina League
Team	Win	Loss	%	GB
Danville Leafs	80	59	.576	–
High Point-Thomasville Hi-Toms	76	63	.547	4
Greensboro Yankees	75	64	.540	5
Burlington Indians	70	67	.511	9
Winston-Salem Red Birds	69	68	.504	10
Raleigh Capitals	63	73	.463	15.5
Wilson Tobs	60	78	.435	19.5
Durham Bulls	58	79	.423	21

== League Leaders ==
=== Batting leaders ===
Stat	Player	Total
AVG	Fred Valentine, Wilson Tobs	.319
H	Tony Curry, High Point-Thomasville Hi-Toms	168
R	Tony Curry, High Point-Thomasville Hi-Toms	106
2B	Phil Jantze, Winston-Salem Red Birds	36
3B	Ralph Alomar, Danville Leafs; Tony Curry, High Point-Thomasville Hi-Toms	9
HR	Bert Barth, Winston-Salem Red Birds; Jacke Davis, High Point-Thomasville Hi-Toms	25
RBI	Allan Milley, Danville Leafs	97
SB	Fred Valentine, Wilson Tobs	27

=== Pitching leaders ===
Stat	Player	Total
W	Jack Taylor, High Point-Thomasville Hi-Toms	19
ERA	John Aehl, Durham Bulls	1.86
CG	Jack Taylor, High Point-Thomasville Hi-Toms	21
SHO	Marshall Renfroe, Danville Leafs; Jack Taylor, High Point-Thomasville Hi-Toms	5
SO	Gene Snyder, High Point-Thomasville Hi-Toms	234
IP	Jack Taylor, High Point-Thomasville Hi-Toms	264.0

== Playoffs ==
- The Burlington Indians won their first Carolina League championship, defeating the Greensboro Yankees in three games.
- The semi-finals and finals were each a best-of-three series.

=== Playoff bracket ===
Semi-finals
1	Danville	1
4	Burlington	2
2	High Point-Thomasville	1
3	Greensboro	2

Finals
4	Burlington	2
3	Greensboro	1

== Awards ==
Carolina League awards
Award name	Recipient
Most Valuable Player	Fred Valentine, Wilson Tobs
Manager of the Year	Vern Hoscheit, Greensboro Yankees; Pinky May, Burlington Indians

== See also ==
- 1958 Major League Baseball season
