= 1957 Carolina League season =

- League: Carolina League
- Sport: Baseball
- Duration: April 17 – September 2
- Games: 140
- Teams: 6

Regular season
- Season MVP: Fred Van Dusen, High Point-Thomasville Hi-Toms

Playoffs
- League champions: Durham Bulls
- Runners-up: High Point-Thomasville Hi-Toms

CL seasons
- ← 1956 1958 →

The 1957 Carolina League was a Class B baseball season played between April 17 and September 2. Six teams played a 140-game schedule, with the top two teams qualifying for the post-season.

The Durham Bulls won the Carolina League championship, defeating the High Point-Thomasville Hi-Toms in the final round of the playoffs.

== Team changes ==
- The Fayetteville Highlanders fold.
- The Wilson Tobs fold.
- The High Point-Thomasville Hi-Toms ended their affiliation with the Cincinnati Redlegs and began a new affiliation with the Philadelphia Phillies.
- The Kinston Eagles ended their affiliation with the Pittsburgh Pirates and began a new affiliation with the Washington Senators.
- The Winston-Salem Twins ended their affiliation with the New York Yankees and began a new affiliation with the St. Louis Cardinals. The club was renamed the Winston-Salem Red Birds.

== Teams ==
1957 Carolina League
Team	City	MLB Affiliate	Stadium
Danville Leafs	Danville, Virginia	New York Giants	League Park
Durham Bulls	Durham, North Carolina	Detroit Tigers	Durham Athletic Park
Greensboro Patriots	Greensboro, North Carolina	Boston Red Sox	World War Memorial Stadium
High Point-Thomasville Hi-Toms	Thomasville, North Carolina	Philadelphia Phillies	Finch Field
Kinston Eagles; Wilson Tobs	Kinston, North Carolina; Wilson, North Carolina	Washington Senators	Grainger Stadium; Fleming Stadium
Winston-Salem Red Birds	Winston-Salem, North Carolina	St. Louis Cardinals	Ernie Shore Field

== Map of teams ==
Carolina League Teams

== Regular season ==
=== Summary ===
- The Durham Bulls and High Point-Thomasville Hi-Toms finished tied with the best record in the regular season.
- The regular season schedule is shortened from 154-games to 140-games.
- On May 11, the Kinston Eagles relocated to Wilson, North Carolina, and were renamed the Wilson Tobs.

=== Standings ===
Carolina League
Team	Win	Loss	%	GB
Durham Bulls	79	61	.564	–
High Point-Thomasville Hi-Toms	79	61	.564	–
Greensboro Patriots	76	64	.543	3
Winston-Salem Red Birds	72	68	.514	7
Danville Leafs	63	77	.450	16
Kinston Eagles / Wilson Tobs	51	89	.364	28

== League Leaders ==
=== Batting leaders ===
Stat	Player	Total
AVG	Eddie Logan, Danville Leafs	.327
H	Frank Kostro, Durham Bulls	167
R	Inocencio Rodriguez, Danville Leafs	109
2B	Frank Kostro, Durham Bulls	34
3B	Frank Kostro, Durham Bulls	12
HR	Gene Oliver, Winston-Salem Red Birds; Bob Perry, Danville Leafs	30
RBI	Inocencio Rodriguez, Danville Leafs	114
SB	John Kennedy, High Point-Thomasville Hi-Toms	23

=== Pitching leaders ===
Stat	Player	Total
W	George Moton, Winston-Salem Red Birds	18
ERA	David Reed, Durham Bulls	2.04
CG	Jack Taylor, High Point-Thomasville Hi-Toms	24
SHO	David Reed, Durham Bulls	6
SO	Ron Jirsa, Greensboro Patriots	228
IP	Jack Taylor, High Point-Thomasville Hi-Toms	258.0

== Playoffs ==
- The Durham Bulls won their first Carolina League championship, defeating the High Point-Thomasville Hi-Toms in seven games.

=== Playoff bracket ===
Finals
1	Durham	4
2	High Point-Thomasville	3

== Awards ==
Carolina League awards
Award name	Recipient
Most Valuable Player	Fred Van Dusen, High Point-Thomasville Hi-Toms
Manager of the Year	Bob Mavis, Durham Bulls

== See also ==
- 1957 Major League Baseball season
