= How to Play First Base =

1917 book

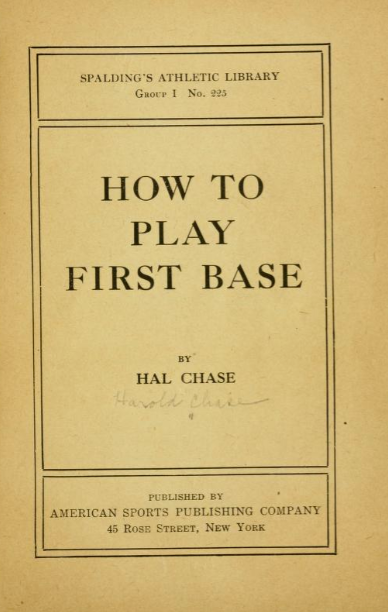
- Title page for How to Play First Base (1917)
- Author: Hal Chase
- Language: English
- Series: Spalding Athletic Library
- Subject: Baseball instruction
- Publisher: American Sports Publishing Company
- Publication date: 1917
- Publication place: United States
- Pages: 68
- OCLC: 743935275
- Dewey Decimal: 796.357
- LC Class: GV875

How to Play First Base is a 1917 instructional book authored by professional baseball player Hal Chase, published as part of the Spalding Athletic Library series. The 68-page guide, issued as Spalding Athletic Library No. 225, originally retailed for 10 cents.

== Content ==
The book provides comprehensive instruction on first-base techniques, including fielding strategies, positioning, footwork, and handling thrown balls. It contains numerous diagrams and photographs illustrating proper form and positioning.

Chase discusses the evolution of first base play in the book's opening chapter, crediting Charles Comiskey and Fred Tenney as "pioneers in modern defensive first base play" who transformed the position's requirements. Chase emphasizes that modern first basemen must "cover almost as much ground as any other infielder" and cannot succeed solely on hitting ability, requiring skills in fielding grounders, fly balls, and foul flies.

== Significance ==
The book represents one of the few instructional works in the Spalding Athletic Library series authored directly by an active professional player, as most were written by sportswriters or managers. It provides insight into early 20th-century baseball instruction methods and the technical requirements of first base play during the dead-ball era.

== Preservation and availability ==
The book is held in multiple institutional collections, including the University of Notre Dame's Rare Books & Special Collections and the New York Public Library's A. G. Spalding Baseball Collection.

The Library of Congress has digitized the complete text as part of their Early Baseball Publications collection, making it freely available online.

== Publication history ==
While the original 1917 edition was published by American Sports Publishing Company, the book has been reprinted numerous times by modern publishers including Forgotten Books (2019), Legare Street Press (2023), and others, indicating continued interest in early baseball instructional literature.

== See also ==
- Spalding Athletic Library
- Dead-ball era
