= Burlington Sock Puppets =

North Carolina minor league baseball team

- Logo

Information
- League: Appalachian League
- Location: Burlington, North Carolina
- Ballpark: Burlington Athletic Stadium
- Founded: 2021
- Division championships: 2 (2022), (2023)
- Colors: Black, blue, red, white
- Ownership: Brittany & Ryan Keur (Knuckleball Entertainment)
- General manager: Anderson Rathbun
- Website: Official website

The Burlington Sock Puppets are a summer collegiate baseball team of the Appalachian League. They are located in Burlington, North Carolina, and play their home games at Burlington Athletic Stadium, informally nicknamed "Sockville".

== History ==
=== Previous Burlington teams ===
Professional baseball was first played in Burlington, North Carolina, from 1958 to 1964 by the Burlington Indians, who competed in the Carolina League (Class B through 1962; thereafter Class A) as a Cleveland Indians farm club. Twenty-two years later, Cleveland placed the Burlington Indians in the Appalachian League as a Rookie-level affiliate from 1986 to 2006. They were known as the Burlington Royals during an affiliation with the Kansas City Royals from 2007 to 2020.

=== Collegiate summer team ===
In conjunction with a contraction of Minor League Baseball beginning with the 2021 season, the Appalachian League was reorganized as a collegiate summer baseball league, and the Burlington Royals were renamed to the Burlington Sock Puppets in the revamped league designed for rising college freshmen and sophomores. The nickname refers to Burlington's textile heritage.
