= Lapine, Alabama =

Unincorporated community in Alabama, United States

- Unincorporated community
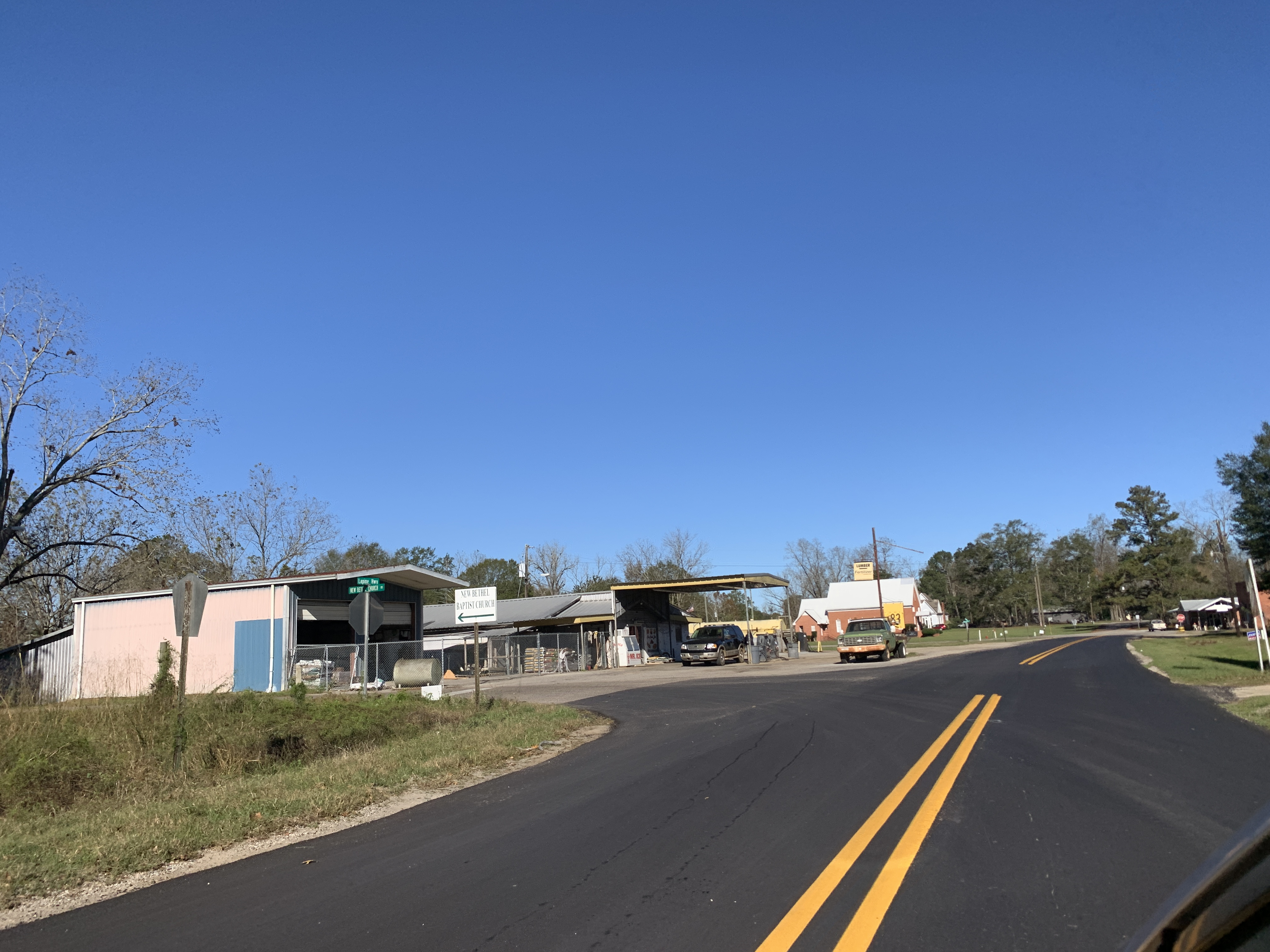

- Location within Alabama Location within the United States
- Coordinates: 31°57′57″N 86°17′04″W
- Country: United States
- State: Alabama
- Counties: Crenshaw, Montgomery
- Elevation: 427 ft (130 m)
- Time zone: UTC-6 (Central (CST))
  - Summer (DST): UTC-5 (CDT)
- ZIP code: 36046
- Area code: 334
- GNIS feature ID: 151995

Lapine /ləˈpaɪn/ is an unincorporated community in Montgomery and Crenshaw counties in the U.S. state of Alabama. Lapine is 27.6 miles (44.4 km) south of Montgomery. Lapine has a post office with ZIP code 36046, which opened on July 12, 1887.

== Notable person ==
- Ed Stroud, former professional baseball outfielder
