= Burlington Royals =

- 1986–2020; Burlington, North Carolina

Team logo	Cap insignia

Minor league affiliations
- Class: Rookie (1986–2020)
- League: Appalachian League (1986–2020)

Major league affiliations
- Team: Kansas City Royals (2007–2020); Cleveland Indians (1986–2006)

Minor league titles
- League titles (2): 1987; 1993
- Division titles (6): 1987; 1988; 1991; 1993; 2012; 2016

Team data
- Name: Burlington Royals (2007–2020); Burlington Indians (1986–2006)
- Ballpark: Burlington Athletic Stadium (1960–2020)

The Burlington Royals were a minor league baseball team in Burlington, North Carolina, United States. They were a Rookie-level team in the Appalachian League. The team was affiliated with the Cleveland Indians from 1986 to 2006 as the Burlington Indians. They were known as the Royals during an affiliation with the Kansas City Royals from 2007 to 2020. The Royals played their home games at Burlington Athletic Stadium. Opened in 1960, Burlington Athletic Stadium held 3,500 fans.

The start of the 2020 season was postponed due to the COVID-19 pandemic before ultimately being cancelled on June 30. In conjunction with a contraction of Minor League Baseball beginning with the 2021 season, the Appalachian League was reorganized as a collegiate summer baseball league, and the Royals continued under a new name, the Burlington Sock Puppets, in the revamped league designed for rising college freshmen and sophomores.

== Playoffs ==
- 2019: Defeated Pulaski 2–1 in semifinals; lost to Johnson City 2–1 in finals.
- 2016: Defeated Princeton 2–1 in semifinals; lost to Johnson City 2–0 in finals.
- 2012: Defeated Johnson City 2–1 in semifinals; lost to Elizabethton 2–1 in finals.
- 2010: Lost to Johnson City 2–0 in semifinals.
- 1993: Defeated Elizabethton 2–0 to win championship.
- 1991: Lost to Pulaski 2–0 in finals.
- 1988: Lost to Kingsport 2–0 in finals.
- 1987: Defeated Johnson City 2–0 to win championship.

== Burlington Indians (Carolina League) ==
In addition to the Appalachian League version of the Burlington Indians, from 1958 to 1964 a team representing Burlington, N.C., of the same name competed in the Carolina League (Class B through 1962; thereafter Class A) as a Cleveland farm club. During its seven years of existence, the Carolina League Burlington Indians won one league championship. Its players included future major leaguers Luis Tiant and Duke Sims.

Prior to opening their Burlington ballpark in 1960, the club was known as Alamance, and played their home games at Graham Athletic Park a.k.a. Graham Park. That park still exists, as the ballfield for Graham Middle School on East Pine Street in Graham, North Carolina.
