= American League Baseball Club of Chicago v. Chase =

- Court: New York Supreme Court
- Full case name: American League Baseball Club of Chicago v. Harold H. Chase
- Decided: July 21, 1914
- Citation: 149 N.Y.S. 6, 86 Misc. Rep. 441 (N.Y. Sup. Ct. 1914)

Case history
- Prior action: Temporary injunction granted June 22, 1914

Court membership
- Judge sitting: Justice Herbert P. Bissell

Keywords
- Reserve clause, baseball, antitrust law, labor law, monopoly

American League Baseball Club of Chicago v. Chase, 149 N.Y.S. 6 (N.Y. Sup. Ct. 1914), was a landmark New York Supreme Court case in which first baseman Hal Chase successfully challenged Major League Baseball's reserve clause. The court ruled that organized baseball operated as an illegal monopoly that violated common law rights to labor and contract. The decision preceded Curt Flood's famous challenge to the reserve clause by 56 years and represented one of the first successful legal challenges to baseball's restrictive labor system.

== Background ==
In March 1914, Hal Chase signed a one-year contract to play first base for the Chicago White Sox of the American League. The contract contained a standard reserve clause, which gave the team perpetual rights to the player's services and prohibited the player from negotiating with other teams.

In June 1914, Chase left the White Sox to sign with the Buffalo Blues of the rival Federal League, which was competing with the established American and National Leagues for players. White Sox owner Charles Comiskey immediately sought an injunction in New York Supreme Court to prevent Chase from playing for Buffalo, citing the reserve clause in Chase's contract.

On June 22, 1914, the court granted a temporary injunction preventing Chase from playing for Buffalo. Chase's attorneys challenged the injunction, arguing that the reserve clause was an illegal restraint of trade and that baseball operated as a monopoly in violation of common law labor rights.

== Court's decision ==
Justice Herbert P. Bissell heard arguments from both parties on July 9-10, 1914. On July 21, 1914, Justice Bissell issued his ruling dissolving the temporary injunction and allowing Chase to play for Buffalo.

In his opinion, Justice Bissell found that organized baseball constituted "a complete monopoly of the baseball business for profit as a monopoly can be made" and that this monopoly "is in contravention of the common law in that it invades the right to labor as a property right; in that it invades the right to contract as a property right and in that it is a combination to restrain and control the exercise of a profession or calling."

The court also noted the "absolute lack of mutuality" in the reserve clause contract—while the team could release a player at any time with minimal notice, the player had no corresponding right to leave the team. This lack of mutuality of obligation rendered the contract unenforceable in equity.

Significantly, Justice Bissell rejected Chase's argument that baseball violated federal antitrust laws, finding that baseball was not interstate commerce subject to federal regulation. However, the court found the reserve clause violated New York common law.

== Aftermath and retaliation ==
Following the court's decision, Chase played for Buffalo in the 1914 and 1915 seasons, leading the Federal League in home runs in 1915. However, the legal victory came at a significant cost. American League president Ban Johnson and Comiskey responded by effectively blacklisting Chase from the American League. Johnson publicly stated that Chase "will never play with any other club" in the American League.

When the Federal League folded after the 1915 season, Chase was barred from returning to any American League team. In an August 1918 interview, Johnson acknowledged: "Hal Chase is barred from American League baseball, has been ever since he left Comiskey's club. It was decided then that he was wrong in his treatment of Comiskey, and our league agreed never to reinstate him." This admission confirmed that the blacklist was retaliation for the 1914 legal challenge rather than any alleged corruption.

== Historical significance ==
The Chase decision established important legal precedent regarding the reserve clause and baseball's labor practices, though its impact was limited by baseball's informal enforcement mechanisms. The ruling demonstrated that the reserve clause was vulnerable to judicial scrutiny under common law principles, even if federal antitrust laws did not apply.

The case preceded Curt Flood's famous challenge to the reserve clause in Flood v. Kuhn (1972) by 56 years. However, unlike Flood's case, which received widespread public attention and support from the Major League Baseball Players Association, Chase's victory occurred when no players' union existed to protect him from retaliation.

The Chase decision was cited in subsequent Federal League litigation, including Federal Baseball Club v. National League (1922), where the U.S. Supreme Court established baseball's controversial antitrust exemption.

Contemporary baseball historians have noted that Chase's legal challenge came at a time when players had no union representation and when defying team ownership carried severe professional consequences. The case illustrates both the legal weaknesses of the reserve clause system and the extra-legal means by which baseball's establishment enforced player control despite adverse court rulings.

== See also ==
- Reserve clause
- Hal Chase
- Federal League
- Federal Baseball Club v. National League
- Flood v. Kuhn
- Curt Flood
- Major League Baseball Players Association
