= Hal Chase =

American baseball player and manager (1883–1947)

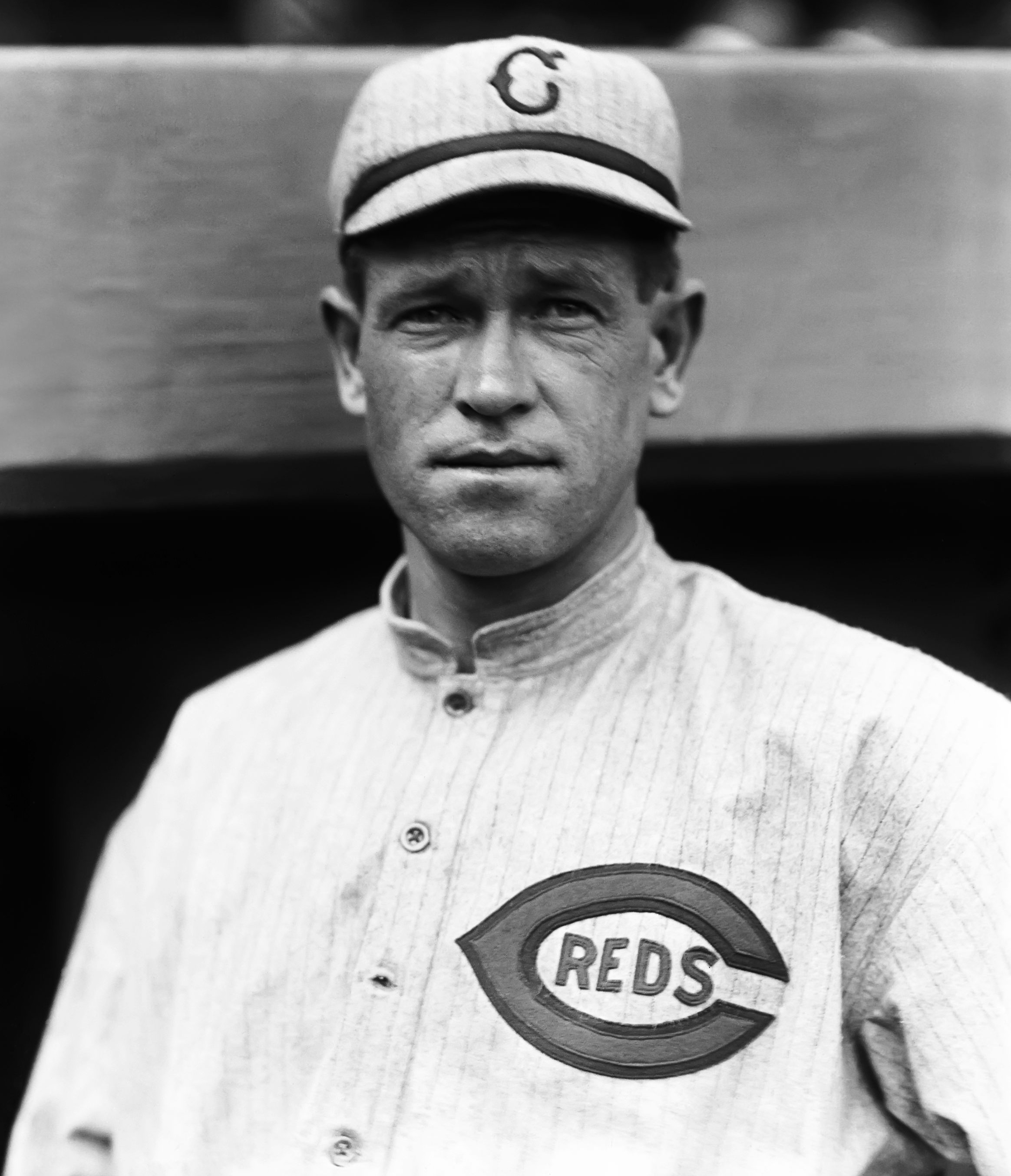
- Chase with the Cincinnati Reds in 1917.
- First baseman / Manager
- Born: February 13, 1883; Los Gatos, California, U.S.
- Died: May 18, 1947 (aged 64); Colusa, California, U.S.
- Batted: Right Threw: Left

MLB debut
- April 26, 1905, for the New York Highlanders

Last MLB appearance
- September 25, 1919, for the New York Giants

MLB statistics
- Batting average: .291
- Hits: 2,158
- Home runs: 57
- Runs batted in: 941
- Stolen bases: 363
- Managerial record: 86–80
- Winning %: .518
- Stats at Baseball Reference

Teams
- As player: New York Highlanders / Yankees (1905–1913); Chicago White Sox (1913–1914); Buffalo Buffeds (1914–1915); Cincinnati Reds (1916–1918); New York Giants (1919); As manager: New York Highlanders (1910–1911)

Career highlights and awards
- NL batting champion (1916); Federal League home run champion (1915)

Harold Homer Chase (February 13, 1883 – May 18, 1947), nicknamed "Prince Hal", was an American professional baseball first baseman and manager in Major League Baseball, widely viewed as the best fielder at his position. During his career, he played for the New York Highlanders (1905–1913), Chicago White Sox (1913–1914), Buffalo Blues (1914–1915), Cincinnati Reds (1916–1918), and New York Giants (1919).

Babe Ruth and Walter Johnson named Chase the best first baseman ever, and contemporary reports described his fielding as outstanding. He is sometimes considered the first true star of the franchise that would eventually become the New York Yankees. In 1981, 62 years after his last major league game, baseball historians Lawrence Ritter and Donald Honig included him in their book The 100 Greatest Baseball Players of All Time. Chase also contributed to baseball culture off the field by authoring the instructional booklet How to Play First Base (1917), one of the few player-written guides in the Spalding Athletic Library series.

Chase was one of the most talented first basemen to ever play the game. However, his legacy remains controversial. In 1914, he successfully challenged baseball's reserve clause in American League Baseball Club of Chicago v. Chase, with the court ruling that organized baseball operated as an illegal monopoly. This legal victory, preceding Curt Flood by 56 years, led to his effective blacklisting from the American League by officials he had defeated in court. Chase subsequently faced persistent allegations of gambling and game-fixing, though he was never convicted of any crime. National League president John Heydler investigated charges in 1919 and found him not guilty. He was indicted in the Black Sox scandal but acquitted. Commissioner Kenesaw Mountain Landis never formally banned Chase, though he was effectively excluded from organized baseball. Contemporary baseball historians debate whether his notorious reputation stems from proven corruption or from retaliation by the baseball establishment he challenged.

== Career ==
Chase attended Santa Clara College, where he played baseball. He signed his first contract with the Los Angeles Angels of the Class-A Pacific Coast League in 1904. The New York Highlanders selected Chase from Los Angeles in the 1904 Rule 5 draft on October 4, 1904.

Chase joined the Highlanders in 1905, and held out during March 1907, threatening to sign with the outlaw California League if the Highlanders did not increase his salary to $4,000. Though he agreed to join the Highlanders in April 1907, he also insisted on playing in the California League during the winter. After the Highlanders fired manager Clark Griffith during the 1908 season, Chase held out and insisted he would not play for new manager Kid Elberfeld. Chase loved playing in the off season in California leagues, which he did nearly every year. And nearly every year, as the major league season approached, Chase looked for a way to remain playing in California. The National Commission ruled that any player who continued in the California league would be suspended from the leagues. Chase continued to play under a pseudonym, Hal Schultz, even as other players returned. Because of the power of the National Agreement and insufficient finances of leagues and teams in California, Chase predictably returned to his major league team and was reinstated in 1908.

He left the team again and returned to the California League in September of the 1908 season. Chase reportedly had been angry that Kid Elberfeld was hired over him to manage the team. He claimed that the Yankees' management had fed a negative story about him to a local newspaper. He played out the rest of the season and paid a fine to get reinstated for the 1909 season.

Late in the 1910 season, Chase took over as player-manager from George Stallings. Stallings alleged that Chase was “laying down” in games, ostensibly with the goal of replacing Stallings as manager as the team's fortunes sank. He informed the team that he would resign if Chase was not released. In September, Stallings was called to a meeting with Yankees management where he was fired as manager in favor of Chase. In 1911, he managed the team to a 76–76 record and quit as manager following the season.

He signed a three-year contract with the Yankees before the 1913 season, but his hitting fell off that season, hitting only .221. Chase had battled injuries that impaired his play. Frank Chance stated that he worried that Chase was "laying down." Chance clarified that he was referring to the question whether Chase would put forth the effort necessary to overcome the current slump. These factors combined led the team to field offers for the player. On June 1, 1913, Yankees traded him to the Chicago White Sox for Babe Borton and Rollie Zeider.

=== Legal challenge to the reserve clause (1914) ===
In early 1914, Chase left the Chicago White Sox to sign with the Buffalo Blues of the Federal League, a rival major league attempting to compete with the established American and National Leagues. White Sox owner Charles Comiskey immediately filed for an injunction in New York State Supreme Court to prevent Chase from playing for Buffalo, citing the reserve clause in Chase's contract that purportedly bound him to the White Sox in perpetuity.

Chase retained legal counsel and challenged the injunction in American League Baseball Club of Chicago v. Chase. On July 21, 1914, New York Supreme Court Justice Herbert Bissell ruled decisively in Chase's favor, finding that organized baseball constituted "a complete monopoly of the baseball business for profit" and that this monopoly violated common law rights to labor and contract. The court also noted the "absolute lack of mutuality" in the contract—the club could release Chase at any time, but Chase could not leave the club. This marked one of the first successful legal challenges to baseball's reserve clause system, which had bound players to their teams since the 1880s.

The ruling established legal precedent that would not be seriously challenged again until Curt Flood's lawsuit in 1970, fifty-six years later. However, unlike Flood's case, which received widespread public attention and union support from the Major League Baseball Players Association, Chase's victory was met with retaliation from baseball's power structure. American League president Ban Johnson and Comiskey, both influential figures in organized baseball, effectively blacklisted Chase from the American League following his Federal League tenure. This animosity ensured that when Chase later faced corruption allegations, he had few allies among team owners or league officials who might have defended him.

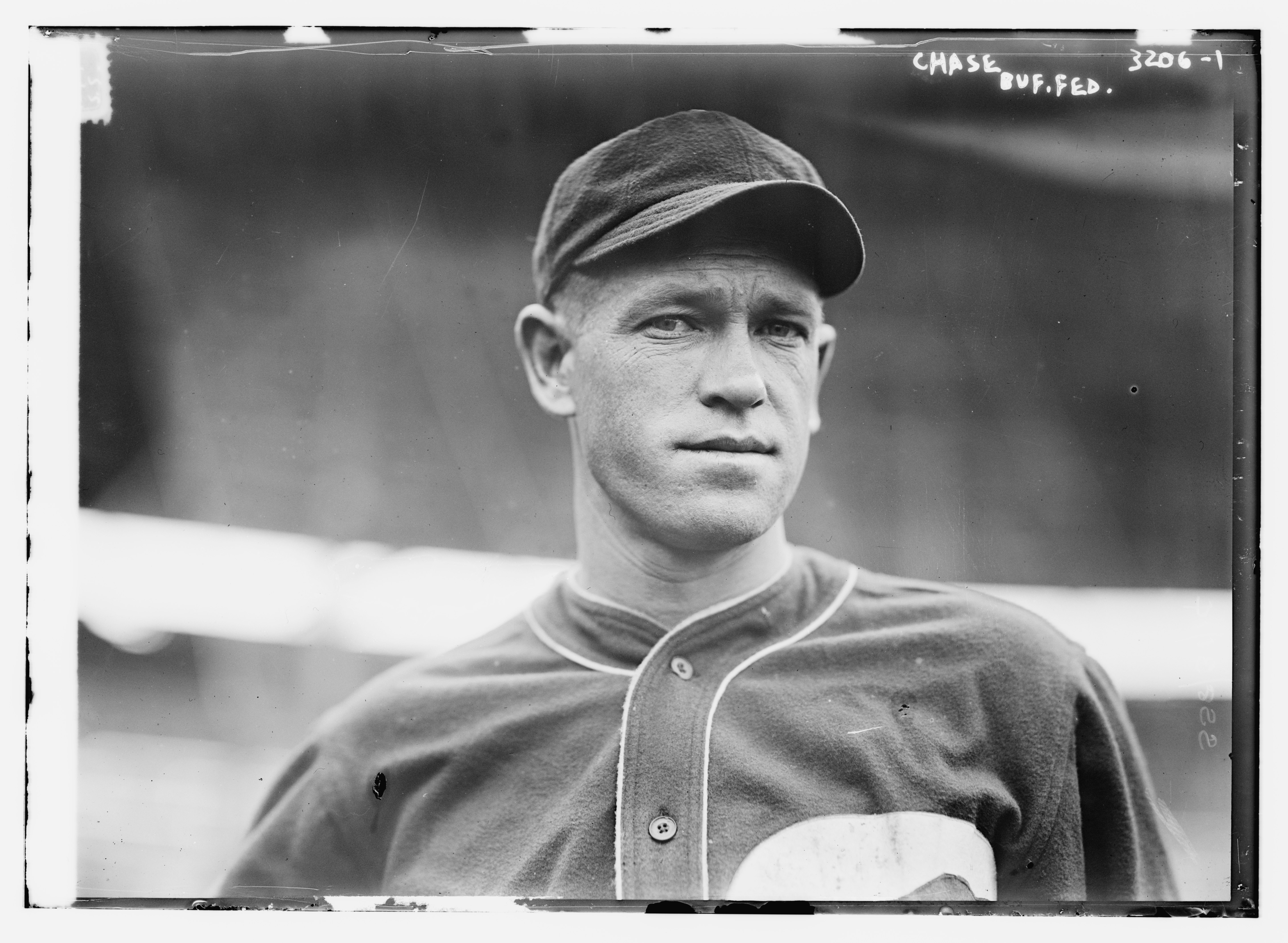
Hal Chase with the Buffalo Blues of the federal league

Contemporary baseball historians have noted that Chase's legal challenge came at a time when players had no union representation and when defying team ownership carried severe professional consequences.

== Publications ==
How to Play First Base is one of the few instructional guides in the Spalding Athletic Library series authored directly by a professional player.

In 1917, Chase authored an instructional booklet titled How to Play First Base, published in New York by the American Sports Publishing Company as part of the Spalding Athletic Library series. The booklet was published in the series, reflecting Chase’s contemporary reputation as a leading first baseman. The 26-page guide includes Chase’s commentary on first-base technique, fielding strategies, and positioning, accompanied by diagrams and photographs illustrating proper form. The work has since been recognized by scholars as culturally significant and is preserved in major research libraries, including the Library of Congress, where it remains in the public domain.

== Later career ==
Chase spent two highly successful years in the Federal League, leading the league in home runs in 1915. When the Federal league folded at the end of the 1915 season, Hal signed with the Cincinnati Reds of the National League. Chase could not sign with an American league team due to his successful challenge to the reserve clause and resulting blacklisting by Ban Johnson in 1914. In 1916, Chase led the National League with a .339 batting average.

== Gambling accusations ==
The gambling and game-fixing accusations that defined Chase's later career intensified following his 1914 legal victory over Comiskey and his subsequent blacklist from the American League. American League president Ban Johnson confirmed in an August 1918 interview that Chase had been barred from the American League since leaving Comiskey's club, stating the decision was based on Chase's treatment of Comiskey rather than gambling allegations. In 1918, his career in Cincinnati ended after his manager, Christy Mathewson, accused him of “indifferent playing”, or betting on baseball and throwing games. Mathewson suspended him indefinitely. Pitcher Jimmy Ring accused Chase of attempting to bribe him in the 1917 season, Chase offered him $50 ($1,070 in current dollar terms) to throw a game against the Giants. Even though Ring refused the team lost the game and Chase paid Ring the money. After Ring reported the incident, Greasy Neale accused Chase of saying that he bragged about winning $500 after a Reds loss and later advised Neale to wager on the Reds before a game.

Before the 1919 season, the N.L. President John Heydler held a hearing on Chase. While he found that Chase “did not take baseball or anything else seriously”, he determined that the charges against Chase were general and unsubstantiated and found him not guilty. The league president noted that in one game where Chase was accused of betting against Cincinnati, he hit a home run to put his team ahead.

Despite the exoneration, the Reds wanted no part of Chase, and arranged a trade with the New York Giants for Walter Holke and Bill Rariden. The deal was held up by Reds president August Herrmann because Chase sued the club for back pay from his suspension. The Giants agreed to settle the matter with Chase and the trade went through on February 19, 1919.

Before the 1920 season, former player Lee Magee, who later sued the Chicago Cubs for allegedly “blackballing” him from baseball, threatened to release the names of players who had thrown games. One of these players was Chase, with whom Magee played in Cincinnati. Magee charged that he and Chase had wagered $500 against Cincinnati on a game against the Boston Braves. Cincinnati won that game with Magee scoring the winning run. The National League president dismissed Magee's claims in that they were based on claims during the 1918 season that he had already ruled were unsubstantiated. The Cubs responded that Magee had confessed to wagering on his own team's game. Magee admitted to this but thought that he was betting on Cincinnati and that Chase told him after the game that they lost the wager. On June 9, 1920, a jury found in favor of the Cubs.

In September 1919, Chase and Heinie Zimmerman were dropped from the Giants lineup. In 1920, the league revealed that the Giants had released Chase and Zimmerman on Heydler's orders when Magee confessed to Heydler behind closed doors. Since no American League team would sign him, he was effectively blackballed from the major leagues.

== Out of organized baseball ==
In 1920, while playing for the minor Mission League, he allegedly attempted to bribe Spider Baum, a pitcher for the Salt Lake City Bees of the Pacific Coast League, to lose a game to the Los Angeles Angels. It turned out to be one of the last games he played in organized baseball. After an investigation by the league, he was barred from the Pacific Coast League and the Mission Baseball League. Babe Borton, for whom Chase was traded in 1913, was also suspended in the scandal.

In late 1920, pitcher Rube Benton accused Chase and Heinie Zimmerman of attempting to bring him $800 (equivalent to $12,900 in 2025) to throw a game when the three played for the Giants. As part of his accusation, he charged that Chase informed him that the White Sox would lose the first two games of the 1919 World Series and would lose the series. He also testified that Chase communicated with Bill Burns, one of the key figures in the Black Sox scandal and that Chase won $40,000 (equivalent to $740,000 in 2025) betting on the series.

In October of that year, a Chicago grand jury indicted him for his role in the Black Sox Scandal, alleging that he brought the idea of throwing the World Series to Abe Attell (Heinie Zimmerman was also indicted). California refused extradition because of an incorrectly issued arrest warrant. Chase and the other accused players were acquitted on August 2, 1921.

Baseball commissioner Kenesaw Mountain Landis later declared that any players who had been involved in throwing games would be banned from baseball, which could have included Chase; however Judge Landis never formally ruled on Chase. But based on Chase's long-term pattern of gambling and his role in the Black Sox Scandal, Landis' declaration after the Black Sox trial is seen as formalizing Chase's ban. Regardless, his career was effectively over by the time Landis was appointed. In his only formal hearing on the matter, National League president John Heydler found him not guilty.

Chase was recruited and hired by the Nogales Internationals to play first base and manage the club for the 1923 season. Chase played for a team in Williams, Arizona, playing games in other mining towns such as Jerome. In early March 1925, newspapers reported that Chase was negotiating with the President of Mexico to become the commissioner of a new Mexican Baseball League.

For a time, Chase was player-manager of an outlaw team in Douglas, Arizona that included banned Black Sox players Buck Weaver, Chick Gandil and Lefty Williams. It was part of a league run by S.L.A. Marshall, who later said that Chase admitted to throwing a game. A few months later, he tore both Achilles tendons in a car accident. He later drifted to Mexico, where in 1925 he began making plans to organize a professional league. When American League president Ban Johnson got word of it, however, he pressured Mexican authorities to deport Chase.

Despite his unsavory past, Chase received a certain amount of National Baseball Hall of Fame support early in its history. During the inaugural Hall of Fame balloting of 1936, Chase garnered 11 votes and was named on 4.9% of the ballots. This total was more votes than 18 future Hall of Famers including such greats as Connie Mack, Rube Marquard, Mordecai "Three Finger" Brown, Charlie Gehringer, and John McGraw as well as the banned Shoeless Joe Jackson. In 1937, he received 18 votes (9%) which was more than 32 future Hall of Famers. Chase was dropped from the ballot following the 1937 vote. He never received the required 75 percent support, largely due to an informal agreement among the Hall of Fame voters that those deemed to have been banned from baseball should be ineligible for consideration.

Chase spent the rest of his life drifting between Arizona and his native California, working numerous low-paying jobs. Later in life, he expressed considerable remorse for betting on baseball. He lived with his sister in Williams, California and died in a Colusa, California hospital at the age of 64.

== Chase defensively ==
In his day, Hal Chase was almost universally considered one of the best fielders in the game — not just at first base, but at any position, even compared to catchers and middle infielders. In his Historical Baseball Abstract, Bill James quotes a poem entitled "You Can't Escape 'Em":

Sometimes a raw recruit in spring is not a pitching find;

He has not Walter Johnson's wing, nor Matty's wonderous mind.

He does not act like Harold Chase upon the fielding job,

But you may find in such a case, he hits like Tyrus Cobb.

Douglas Dewey and Nicholas Acocella's book on Chase, The Black Prince Of Baseball, talks about Chase's defensive abilities at length. He apparently made many spectacular plays that burnished his reputation as an exceptional fielder, but also committed 402 errors at first in just ten seasons, making his career fielding average only .980, four points below average for the period. Since Chase was known to throw games, it's impossible to know how many of these misplays were intentional.

A more recent work by Bill James, Win Shares, suggested Chase was only a C-grade defensive player at first base. According to analyst Sean Smith of Baseball-Reference.com, Chase was below average defensively, costing his teams 65 runs versus an average first baseman.

== Managerial record ==
Team	Year	Regular season					Postseason			
Team	Year	Games	Won	Lost	Win %	Finish	Won	Lost	Win %	Result
NYH	1910	14	10	4	.714	2nd in AL	–	–	–	–
NYH	1911	152	76	76	.500	6th in AL	–	–	–	–
Total		166	86	80	.518		0	0	–	

== See also ==
- List of Major League Baseball career stolen bases leaders
- List of Major League Baseball player-managers
