= Walt Matthews =

Walter Ray Matthews (October 19, 1934 – April 28, 2014) was a baseball figure who spent 51 years in the Houston Astros organization—at the time, a club record.

Matthews was born in Ashdown, Arkansas. A first baseman and outfielder, he began his professional career in the St. Louis Cardinals organization in 1956 and remained in their system through 1959. He played for the Triple-A Omaha Cardinals in 1959. He joined the Milwaukee Braves system in 1960 (and played briefly at Triple-A again) before signing on with the Jacksonville Jets of the Houston Colt .45s system in 1961. He remained in the Colt .45s/Astros system through 1967—mostly playing at Single A ball—hitting 30 home runs for the Durham Bulls in 1963 (then a club record. In 1966, he managed the Salisbury Astros; in 1967, he skippered the Cocoa Astros. His playing career ended after 1967. Overall, he batted .272 with 137 home runs a 1,134 hits in 1,230 games.

Following his playing and manager career, he became a scout for Houston, signing numerous players including Bill Doran, Johnny Ray and Robbie Wine. He retired in 2012. He died on April 28, 2014, in Ashdown, Arkansas.
