= Mike Derrick (baseball) =

American baseball player (1943–2009)

- Left fielder / First baseman
- Born: September 19, 1943; Columbia, South Carolina, U.S.
- Died: January 14, 2009 (aged 65); Columbia, South Carolina, U.S.
- Batted: Left Threw: Right

MLB debut
- April 9, 1970, for the Boston Red Sox

Last MLB appearance
- June 24, 1970, for the Boston Red Sox

MLB statistics
- Batting average: .212
- Home runs: 0
- Runs batted in: 5
- Stats at Baseball Reference

Teams
- Boston Red Sox (1970)

James Michael Derrick (September 19, 1943 – January 14, 2009) was an American left fielder and first baseman in Major League Baseball who played briefly for the Boston Red Sox during the 1970 season. Listed at 6' 0", 190 lb., he batted left-handed and threw right-handed. He was born in Columbia, South Carolina.

Derrick graduated from Brookland-Cayce High School in 1961. While there he lettered in Football, Baseball, Basketball, and Track. For football he was selected as an All-American and the State AAA Back of the Year in 1960. Also, in 1960, he was a unanimous all-state selection. He was a member of the 1960 Shrine Bowl team and attended the University of South Carolina on a football and baseball scholarship.

Derrick signed as an amateur free agent with the Pittsburgh Pirates in 1962, then was sent by Pittsburgh to the Detroit Tigers in exchange for Chris Cannizzaro in 1967. During his minor league baseball career, Derrick was primarily a first baseman. Later, he was selected by the Red Sox from Detroit in the 1969 Rule 5 major league draft.

In a 24-game career, Derrick posted a .212 batting average (7-for-33) with five RBI, three runs, and a double without home runs. Used mostly in pinch-hitting and pinch-running roles, he made two appearances in left field and one at first base.

He died in January 2009 in Columbia, South Carolina.

== Sources ==
- Career statistics from Baseball Reference · Baseball Reference (Minors) · Retrosheet · Baseball Almanac
- Retrosheet
