= Johnnie Seale =

American baseball player (born 1938)

- Pitcher
- Born: November 14, 1938 (age 87); Edgewater, Colorado, U.S.
- Batted: Left Threw: Left

MLB debut
- September 20, 1964, for the Detroit Tigers

Last MLB appearance
- May 2, 1965, for the Detroit Tigers

MLB statistics
- Win–loss record: 1-0
- Earned run average: 5.54
- Strikeouts: 8
- Stats at Baseball Reference

Teams
- Detroit Tigers (1964–65)

Johnny Ray Seale (born November 14, 1938), nicknamed "Durango Kid", is an American former Major League Baseball pitcher. He pitched in eight games over two seasons, 1964 and 1965, for the Detroit Tigers. He is the only Durango High School graduate to play for Major League Baseball.

== Early life ==
Seale was born in Edgewater, Colorado, but grew up in Durango, Colorado, where he attended Durango High School, participating in multiple sports including wrestling, football and baseball, as well as being active representing Durango in state and national 4-H competitions. He graduated in 1957.

== Career ==
Seale began his baseball career in 1958, being signed as an amateur by the Washington Senators, first playing with that team's D League affiliate in Gainesville, Florida. He was traded to the Chicago Cubs organization in 1959, and in one notable game for the Paris Lakers Seale struck out 20 batters in a game against the Dubuque Packers.

Seale played 11 seasons in the minor leagues, earning a 65–68 career pitching record, generating 934 strikeouts over 1,195 innings pitched.

He was traded to the Tiger organization in 1960, and made his debut with that MLB team on September 20, 1964. On September 23 of that year Seale earned his first and only MLB win against the Baltimore Orioles, striking out four batters over four innings for a 10–3 Tiger win.

Seale completed his professional baseball career in 1968 with the Charlotte Hornets.

== Personal life ==
Seale continued his agricultural pursuits post-baseball, exhibiting prized livestock in regional fairs through Ben Seale & Sons. He also worked in construction and raised goats with his wife Peppy.

Seale's son Marvin, also a Durango High School graduate, was drafted by the New York Mets organization in 1998, playing in that team's minor league organization for seven season, culminating in 2003 with the Binghampton Mets.

== Sources ==
- Career statistics from Baseball Reference · Baseball Reference (Minors) · Retrosheet · Baseball Almanac
