= Curt Flood =

American baseball player (1938–1997)

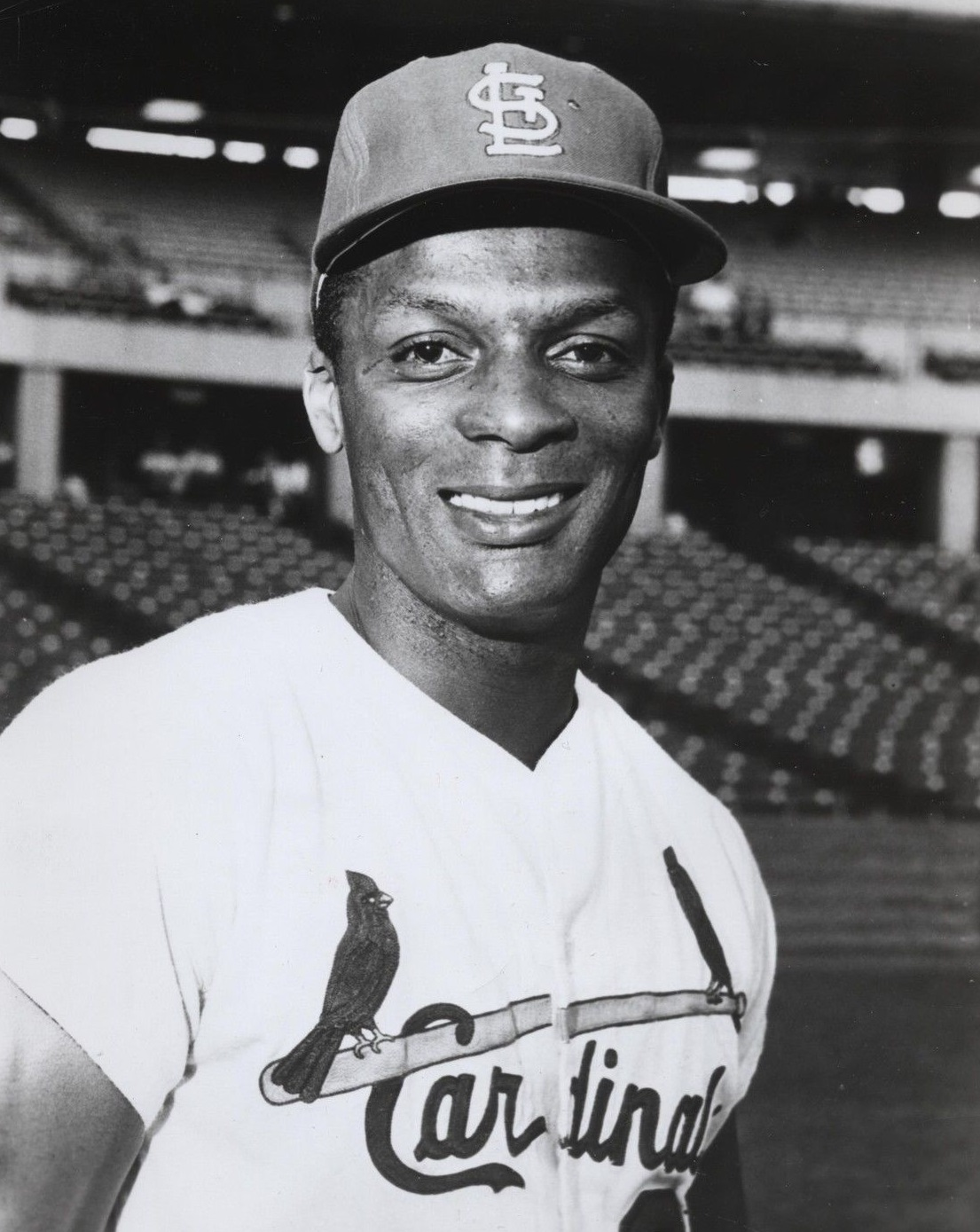
- Flood with the St. Louis Cardinals
- Center fielder
- Born: January 18, 1938; Houston, Texas, U.S.
- Died: January 20, 1997 (aged 59); Los Angeles, California, U.S.
- Batted: Right Threw: Right

MLB debut
- September 9, 1956, for the Cincinnati Redlegs

Last MLB appearance
- April 25, 1971, for the Washington Senators

MLB statistics
- Batting average: .293
- Home runs: 85
- Runs batted in: 636
- Stats at Baseball Reference

Teams
- Cincinnati Redlegs (1956–1957); St. Louis Cardinals (1958–1969); Washington Senators (1971)

Career highlights and awards
- 3× All-Star (1964, 1966, 1968); 2× World Series champion (1964, 1967); 7× Gold Glove Award (1963–1969); St. Louis Cardinals Hall of Fame

Curtis Charles Flood Sr. (January 18, 1938 – January 20, 1997) was an American professional baseball center fielder and activist. He played 15 seasons in Major League Baseball (MLB) for the Cincinnati Redlegs, St. Louis Cardinals, and Washington Senators.

Flood was a three-time All-Star, a Gold Glove winner for seven consecutive seasons, and batted over .300 in six seasons. He led the National League (NL) in hits (211) in 1964 and in singles, 1963, 1964, and 1968. Flood also led the National League in putouts as center fielder four times and in fielding percentage as center fielder three times. He retired with the third most games in center field (1683) in NL history, trailing Willie Mays and Richie Ashburn.

Flood became one of the pivotal figures in the sport's labor history when he refused to accept a trade following the 1969 season, ultimately appealing his case to the U.S. Supreme Court. Although his legal challenge was unsuccessful, it brought about additional solidarity among players as they fought against baseball's reserve clause and sought free agency.

== Early years ==
Born in Houston, Texas, and raised in Oakland, California, Flood played in the same outfield in West Oakland's McClymonds High School as Vada Pinson and Frank Robinson. All three would eventually sign professional contracts with the Cincinnati Reds. Flood transferred to Oakland Technical High School, from which he graduated.

== MLB career ==
Flood signed with the Cincinnati Redlegs in 1956 and made a handful of appearances for the team in 1956–57. However, Flood was deemed expendable with future star centerfielder Vada Pinson preparing to be promoted to the majors. He was traded to the St. Louis Cardinals in December 1957.

For the next 12 seasons, he became a fixture in center field for St. Louis; although he struggled at the plate from 1958 to 1960, his defensive skill was apparent. He had his breakthrough year at the plate after Johnny Keane took over as manager in 1961: he batted .322, followed by .296 in 1962 with 11 home runs. He continued to improve offensively in 1963, hitting .302 and scoring a career-high 112 runs, third-most in the NL; he also had career bests in doubles (34), triples (9) and stolen bases (17) and collected 200 hits in an NL-leading 662 at bats. In that year he received the first of his seven consecutive Gold Gloves.

He earned his first All-Star selection in 1964. He batted .311. His 679 at-bats led the NL again and were the fifth-highest total in league history to that point, setting a team record by surpassing Taylor Douthit's 1930 total of 664; Lou Brock broke the team record three years later with 689. He tied for tops in hits with The Pittsburgh Pirates' Roberto Clemente with 211. Batting leadoff in the World Series against the New York Yankees, he hit only .200 but scored in three of the Cardinal victories as the team won in seven games for its first championship since 1946. In 1965, Flood had his greatest power output with 11 home runs and 83 runs batted in while he was hitting .310. He made the All-Star team again in 1966, a season in which he did not commit a single error in the outfield; his record errorless streak of 226 games (NL record for an outfielder) and 568 total chances (major league record) ran from September 3, 1965, to June 4, 1967.

In 1967, he had his highest batting mark with a .335 average (though his other batting totals fell off from previous years), helping the Cardinals to another championship. In the World Series against the Boston Red Sox, he hit a woeful .179 but made some crucial contributions. In game 1, he advanced Brock to third base twice, putting him in position to score both runs in a 2–1 victory; in game 3, he drove Brock in with the first run of a 5–2 win. As team co-captain (with Tim McCarver) in 1968 he had perhaps his best year, earning his third All-Star selection and finishing fourth in the MVP balloting (won by teammate Bob Gibson) on the strength of a .301 batting average and 186 base hits. Against the San Francisco Giants that year, Flood was involved in the final outs of the first back-to-back no-hitters in major league history. On September 17, he struck out for the final out of Gaylord Perry's 1–0 gem. The next day, he caught Willie McCovey's fly ball for the final out of Ray Washburn's 2–0 no-hitter.

Torrential rains the night before had soaked the Busch Stadium field, and had he not momentarily lost his footing chasing a Jim Northrup fly ball (ruled a triple) with two out in the seventh inning of game 7 of the World Series against the Detroit Tigers, the Cardinals might have won their third championship of the decade; Detroit scored twice on the play, with Northrup later coming in for a 3–0 lead, and won the game, 4–1. Up to that point, Flood had been enjoying the best series of his career despite dealing with personal problems at home, hitting .286 with three steals.

After the season ended, Flood was upset when Cardinals' president Gussie Busch, and CEO of team owner Anheuser-Busch, offered him only a $5,000 raise, far short of the $90,000 salary he believed he deserved after his stellar regular season. He believed Busch, with whom he had previously enjoyed a close personal friendship, was expressing his displeasure over the error that had likely cost the team the Series. While Busch eventually relented, Flood took it personally when Busch publicly chewed the team out after most players boycotted spring training before the 1969 season for a week, accusing players of forgetting that fans were what kept the sport going (although he did not mention any player by name).

In 1969, despite the lower pitching mound instituted that season, which saw a general rise in batting average league-wide, Flood's batting average slipped to .285. His brother was arrested during the season. Late in the season, he publicly criticized the team for reorganizing before they were officially eliminated. He received his seventh Gold Glove that season just as other events in his career began to affect the entire sport. Flood collected the first hit in a major league regular-season game in Canada. He doubled off Montreal Expos pitcher Larry Jaster in the first inning of the Expos' inaugural home game on April 14 at Jarry Park. (Jaster, a Cardinal teammate of Flood's the year before, had been selected by the Expos in the expansion draft.)

== Challenging the reserve clause ==
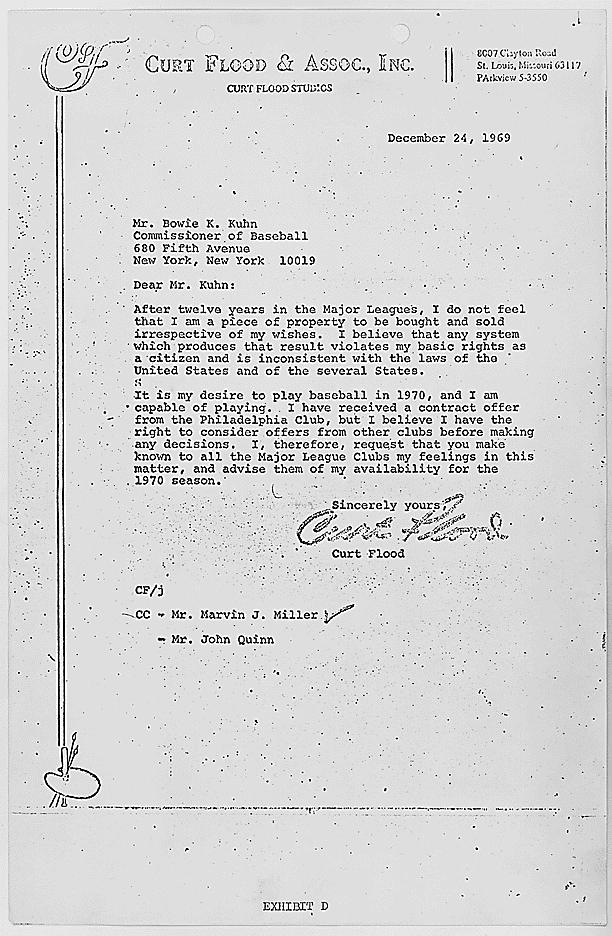
Flood's letter to Bowie Kuhn in December 1969

Despite his outstanding playing career, Flood's principal legacy developed off the field. He believed that Major League Baseball's decades-old reserve clause was unfair in that it kept players beholden for life to the team with which they originally signed, even when they had satisfied the terms and conditions of those contracts.

Flood's challenge was not the first legal attack on the reserve clause. In 1914, first baseman Hal Chase successfully challenged the clause in American League Baseball Club of Chicago v. Chase, with a New York court ruling that organized baseball operated as an illegal monopoly violating common law labor rights. However, Chase's victory occurred in an era without a players' union, and baseball's establishment responded through informal blacklisting rather than systemic change. Flood's challenge, supported by the Major League Baseball Players Association, would prove far more consequential.

On October 7, 1969, the Cardinals traded Flood, Tim McCarver, Byron Browne, and Joe Hoerner to the Philadelphia Phillies for Dick Allen, Cookie Rojas, and Jerry Johnson. Flood refused to report to the moribund Phillies, citing the team's poor record and dilapidated Connie Mack Stadium, and for what he alleged were belligerent—and racist—fans. Flood said, "That I didn't think that I was going to report to Philadelphia, mainly because I didn't want to pick up twelve years of my life and move to another city." Some reports say he was also irritated that he had learned of the trade from a reporter; but Flood wrote in his autobiography that he was told by midlevel Cardinals management and was angry that the call did not come from the general manager, further alienating him from Busch. He met with Phillies' general manager John Quinn, who left the meeting believing that he had persuaded Flood to report to the team. Flood stood to forfeit a lucrative $100,000 (equivalent to $829,049 in 2025) contract if he did not report; but after a meeting with players' union head Marvin Miller, who informed him that the union was prepared to fund a lawsuit, he decided to pursue his legal options.

In a letter to Baseball Commissioner Bowie Kuhn, Flood demanded that the commissioner declare him a free agent:

December 24, 1969
After twelve years in the major leagues, I do not feel I am a piece of property to be bought and sold irrespective of my wishes. I believe that any system which produces that result violates my basic rights as a citizen and is inconsistent with the laws of the United States and of the several States.

It is my desire to play baseball in 1970, and I am capable of playing. I have received a contract offer from the Philadelphia club, but I believe I have the right to consider offers from other clubs before making any decision. I, therefore, request that you make known to all Major League clubs my feelings in this matter, and advise them of my availability for the 1970 season.

Flood was influenced by the events of the 1960s that took place in the United States. According to Marvin Miller, Flood told the executive board of the players' union, "I think the change in black consciousness in recent years has made me more sensitive to injustice in every area of my life." However, he added that he was challenging the reserve clause primarily as a major league ballplayer.

=== Flood v. Kuhn ===
Commissioner Kuhn denied Flood's request for free agency, citing the propriety of the reserve clause and its inclusion in Flood's 1969 contract. On January 16, 1970, Flood filed a $1 million lawsuit against Kuhn and Major League Baseball, alleging violation of federal antitrust laws. Flood likened the reserve clause to slavery. Among those testifying on his behalf were former players Jackie Robinson and Hank Greenberg, and former owner Bill Veeck. Although players' union representatives had voted unanimously to support Flood, rank-and-file players were divided, with many players believing that eliminating the reserve clause would hurt the game. Notably, Carl Yastrzemski stated that: "Personally, I am against what Curt Flood is trying to do because it would ruin the game."

Notable players who openly supported Flood included Dick Allen and former teammate Lou Brock. Several bench players supported Flood as well, including pitcher Pete Richert who stated, "As far as I'm concerned, I think Curt Flood deserves a lot of praise. He has guts. I don't know if I could give up a good salary for a principle. I'm behind him." Additionally, former Dodgers star pitcher Sandy Koufax, who staged a highly-publicized joint holdout with teammate Don Drysdale before the 1966 season, praised Flood: "I have to give Curt the greatest amount of credit for believing in what he's doing. At the salary he's making, that's the kind of money which he's never going to get back."

Flood v. Kuhn (407 U.S. 258) was argued before the Supreme Court on March 20, 1972. Flood's attorney, former Supreme Court Justice Arthur Goldberg, asserted that the reserve clause depressed wages and limited players to one team for life. Major League Baseball's counsel, Louis Hoynes, countered that if Flood won his case, "it would be in shambles." On June 19, 1972, the Supreme Court, invoking the principle of stare decisis ("to stand by things decided"), ruled 5–3 in favor of Major League Baseball, citing as precedent a 1922 ruling in Federal Baseball Club v. National League (259 U.S. 200). Justice Lewis Powell recused himself owing to his ownership of stock in Anheuser-Busch, which owned the Cardinals.

=== Later legal developments ===
Despite the loss in the Supreme Court, the baseball players' union continued to push to eliminate the reserve clause. It was finally struck down in December 1975 in a case involving players Dave McNally and Andy Messersmith. In July 1976, the union and the baseball team owners agreed to a contract that included free agency.

In 1998, the federal government passed the Curt Flood Act of 1998. The act, passed by the 105th Congress and signed into law by President Clinton, revokes baseball's antitrust status (save for expansion, minor leagues, and franchise relocation), a status that major league baseball had enjoyed for seventy-five years after the Supreme Court had ruled that baseball was eligible for the status under interstate commerce. This act did exactly what Flood wanted; it stopped owners from controlling the players' contracts and careers.

Flood also helped bring about the 10/5 Rule, also known as the Curt Flood Rule. The rule states that when a player has played for a team for five straight years and played in MLB for a total of ten years, he has to give the club his consent to be traded.

== Aftermath ==
=== Final years in baseball ===
After Flood's lawsuit failed, Flood was blackballed from baseball. There were questions similar to "Do you realize you won't be able to play in MLB ever again?" or "You realize you are going to lose your job?" Everyone Flood consulted was convinced he would be blackballed from baseball. Flood soon realized that his career was over as he later said,

It would be difficult to come back. And besides, I don't think I'll be getting the opportunity to play again. As big as it is, baseball is a closely-knit unit. I doubt even one of the 24 men controlling the game would touch me with a ten-foot pole. You can't buck the Establishment.

Flood sat out the entire 1970 season. During this period he was bombarded with hate mail from fans, who accused him of trying to destroy baseball; his teammate Bob Gibson estimated "He got four or five death threats a day." The Cardinals sent two minor leaguers to the Phillies as compensation for Flood's refusal to report. One of them—centerfielder Willie Montañez—went on to a 14-year major league career. In November 1970, the Phillies traded Flood and four other players to the Washington Senators. He signed a $110,000 contract with Washington but played only thirteen games of the 1971 season, with a .200 batting average and lackluster play in center field. Despite manager Ted Williams's vote of confidence, Flood left the team in late April and retired. He had a lifetime batting average of .293 with 1,861 hits, 85 home runs, 851 runs, and 636 RBI. Defensively, Flood posted a .987 fielding percentage in his major-league career. Later that year Flood published a memoir entitled The Way It Is in which he spelled out in detail his argument against the reserve clause.

=== Retirement ===
After his retirement, Flood purchased a bar in the resort town of Palma de Mallorca on the island of Mallorca, where he had moved in the wake of the bankruptcy of his Curt Flood Associates business, two lawsuits, and an IRS lien on a home he bought for his mother. He returned to baseball as a member of the Oakland Athletics broadcasting team in 1978. In 1988 he was named commissioner of the short-lived Senior Professional Baseball Association. In the mid-1990s, he joined the management group of the United Baseball League (UBL), which was envisioned as a smaller alternative to MLB. While the group negotiated a long-term TV contract with Liberty Media, the deal (and the UBL) failed when Liberty was absorbed by MLB contractor Fox Sports. In his spare time, he painted; his 1989 oil portrait of Joe DiMaggio sold at auction for $9,500 in 2006.

== Personal life and health ==
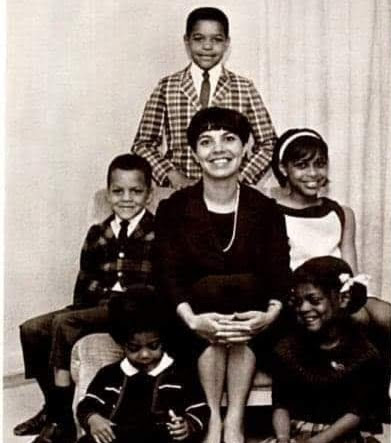
Flood's first wife Beverly with their children: Debbie (right), Gary (standing), Shelly (lower right), Scott (lower left), and Curt Jr. (left)

Flood was married twice. His first marriage was to Beverly Collins from 1959 until 1966, and together they had five children. Flood later married actress Judy Pace in 1986, whom he had met in the 1960s (Pace, recently divorced, had been married to actor Don Mitchell for the previous 13 years). They remained married until Flood's death (10 years).

Diagnosed with throat cancer in 1995, Flood was initially given a 90–95 percent chance of survival. He underwent radiation treatments, chemotherapy, and throat surgery, which left him unable to speak.

== Death and legacy ==
On January 20, 1997, just two days after his 59th birthday, Flood died at UCLA Medical Center in Los Angeles, California. After developing pneumonia. He was interred in Inglewood Park Cemetery in Inglewood.

Just before his death, Flood's legacy was acknowledged in Congress in 1997 via the Baseball Fans and Communities Protection Act of 1997. Numbered HR 21 (Flood's Cardinals uniform number) and introduced in the House of Representatives on the first day of the 105th Congress by Rep. John Conyers Jr. (D–Michigan), the legislation established federal antitrust law protection for major league baseball players to the same extent as provided for other professional athletes.

Curt Flood is a nonparticipating but pivotal character in the book Our Gang by Philip Roth.

Flood's struggle for free agency was featured in Ken Burns' documentary series Baseball in 1994. He was inducted into the Baseball Reliquary's Shrine of the Eternals in 1999.

In 2015, the National Baseball Hall of Fame and Museum paid tribute to Flood, with Tony Clark, the Executive Director of the Major League Baseball Players Association, speaking about Flood’s contributions; however, Flood has not been inducted into the Hall of Fame.

In 2020, 102 members of the U.S. Congress wrote a letter to the Baseball Hall of Fame, co-signed by Players' unions from the NFL, NHL, NBA, and MLS, asking the Hall of Fame to admit Flood.

== See also ==
- List of Gold Glove Award winners at outfield
- List of Major League Baseball career putouts as a center fielder leaders
- List of Major League Baseball career assists as a center fielder leaders
- List of Major League Baseball career double plays as a center fielder leaders
