= Pete Craig =

Canadian baseball player (born 1940)

- Pitcher
- Born: July 10, 1940 (age 84); LaSalle, Ontario, Canada
- Batted: Left Threw: Right

MLB debut
- September 6, 1964, for the Washington Senators

Last MLB appearance
- September 24, 1966, for the Washington Senators

MLB statistics
- Win–loss record: 0–3
- Earned run average: 11.50
- Strikeouts: 3
- Stats at Baseball Reference

Teams
- Washington Senators (1964–1966)

Peter Joel Craig (born July 10, 1940) is a Canadian former professional baseball player. He pitched in six games in Major League Baseball, four as a starter, over parts of three seasons (1964–1966) for the Washington Senators. He also pitched in the minor leagues from 1963 to 1967. Craig batted left-handed, threw right-handed, stood 6 ft 5 in (1.96 m) tall and weighed 220 lb (100 kg).

== Early life and career ==
Born in LaSalle, Ontario, Craig attended Assumption College School, where he failed three times to make the school's baseball team. He attended college at the University of Detroit Mercy, where he spent three years pitching for the Detroit Mercy Titans. In his first varsity start on April 15, 1961, he pitched a seven-inning no-hitter against Olivet College. He finished his college career with a 20-4 win–loss record and a school-record 219 strikeouts.

Craig was signed as an amateur free agent by the Detroit Tigers on June 13, 1963, for about $13,000 and was assigned to the Class A Duluth-Superior Dukes of the Northern League. He pitched a complete game, one-hitter against the Winnipeg Goldeyes on July 21. After Duluth-Superior won the Northern League championship, Craig was promoted to the Double-A Knoxville Smokies in late August. He finished the 1963 season with a 8–6 record and 2.32 earned run average across both leagues, with his 2.51 mark with Duluth-Superior the lowest in the Northern League. In April 1964, he was claimed by the Washington Senators for $8,000. In 28 games with the Rocky Mount Senators in 1964, he led the league with 20 complete games and 208 innings pitched and was named a Carolina League all-star.

== Bouncing from minor to major leagues ==
Craig was called up to the Senators on September 3, 1964, and made his major league debut on September 6 against the Tigers. He allowed four earned runs in 1.0 innings in his debut, and would make one more appearance on October 4. In a start against the Boston Red Sox, he yielded five runs and issued three base on balls in 0.2 innings.

In April 1965, the Senators sent Craig down to the Triple-A Hawaii Islanders. After going 14-11 for Hawaii, he was recalled to Washington on September 4. He started and lost all three games that he appeared in, allowing 13 earned runs in 14.1 innings and striking out two batters. He won 14 minor league games for the third-straight season in 1966 before being recalled on September 6, 1966. Craig appeared in one major league game that month, pitching 2.0 innings against the Chicago White Sox on September 24. He began the 1967 season with the Indianapolis Indians before rejoining the Islanders on July 11. Craig quit baseball after the 1967 season and worked at a bank in North Carolina.
