= Art López =

Puerto Rican baseball player (born 1937)

- Outfielder
- Born: May 8, 1937 (age 88); Mayagüez, Puerto Rico
- Batted: Left Threw: Left

Professional debut
- MLB: April 12, 1965, for the New York Yankees
- NPB: April 6, 1968, for the Tokyo Orions

Last appearance
- MLB: September 29, 1965, for the New York Yankees
- NPB: October 22, 1973, for the Yakult Atoms

MLB statistics
- Batting average: .143
- Home runs: 0
- Runs batted in: 0
- Stats at Baseball Reference

Teams
- New York Yankees (1965); Tokyo Orions (1968); Lotte Orions (1969–1971); Yakult Atoms (1972–1973)

Arturo López Rodríguez (born May 8, 1937) is a Puerto Rican former professional baseball player. He played one season in Major League Baseball as an outfielder for the New York Yankees in 1965. He also played in Nippon Professional Baseball from 1968 until 1973, becoming the first Puerto Rican to do so.

During his lone major league season, López played in 38 games in his one-year career. Lopez had seven hits in 49 at-bats, a .143 batting average. His greater success came in Japan's NPB, where he played for six seasons. In those seasons he batted .290 with 116 home runs. He was an All-Star in 1968, and played in the Japan Series in 1970 for the Lotte Orions.

== See also ==
- List of Major League Baseball players from Puerto Rico
