= Ed Stroud =

American baseball player (1939–2012)

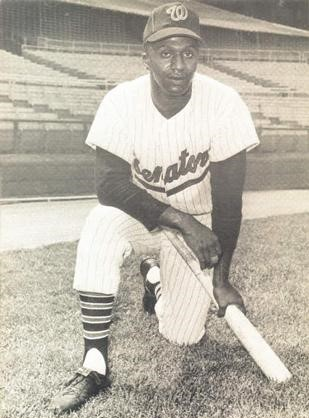
- Outfielder
- Born: October 31, 1939; Lapine, Alabama, U.S.
- Died: July 2, 2012 (aged 72); Cleveland, Ohio, U.S.
- Batted: Left Threw: Right

MLB debut
- September 11, 1966, for the Chicago White Sox

Last MLB appearance
- June 29, 1971, for the Chicago White Sox

MLB statistics
- Batting average: .237
- Home runs: 14
- Runs batted in: 100
- Stolen bases: 72
- Stats at Baseball Reference

Teams
- Chicago White Sox (1966–1967); Washington Senators (1967–1970); Chicago White Sox (1971)

Edwin Marvin Stroud (October 31, 1939 – July 2, 2012) was an American professional baseball player. An outfielder, he played in the Major Leagues from 1966–1971 for the Chicago White Sox and Washington Senators. He was signed by the Chicago White Sox as an undrafted free agent in 1963.

Born in Lapine, Alabama on October 31, 1939, Stroud lived in Warren, Ohio for about 70 years. He was a 1958 graduate of Warren G. Harding High School who also served in the United States Army.

A prolific base stealer during his minor league career, Stroud was nicknamed "The Streak" for his speed and "The Creeper" for his unusual walk. Stroud stole 57 bases for the 1966 Indianapolis Indians of the Pacific Coast League, and in his best MLB season, he swiped 29 bases and batted .266 for the 1970 Senators. On July 4, 1968, Stroud paced his Senators to a 4-2 victory over the New York Yankees, slugging two doubles and two triples.

Following the conclusion of his active playing career, he was the Equal Opportunity Coordinator for the City of Warren until his retirement in 1998. He died at age 72 at University Hospitals of Cleveland on July 2, 2012.
