= Don Lock =

American baseball player (1936–2017)

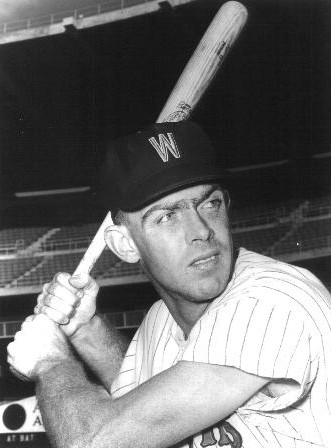
- Lock in 1962
- Center fielder
- Born: July 27, 1936; Wichita, Kansas, U.S.
- Died: October 8, 2017 (aged 81); Wichita, Kansas, U.S.
- Batted: Right Threw: Right

MLB debut
- July 17, 1962, for the Washington Senators

Last MLB appearance
- October 1, 1969, for the Boston Red Sox

MLB statistics
- Batting average: .238
- Home runs: 122
- Runs batted in: 373
- Stats at Baseball Reference

Teams
- Washington Senators (1962–1966); Philadelphia Phillies (1967–1969); Boston Red Sox (1969)

Don Wilson Lock (July 27, 1936 – October 8, 2017) was an American professional baseball player and outfielder in the Major Leagues from 1962 to 1969 for the Washington Senators (1962–66), Philadelphia Phillies (1967–69), and Boston Red Sox (1969). A native of Wichita, Kansas, Lock attended Kingman, Kansas, High School, then what is now Wichita State University. He stood 6 ft 2 in (1.88 m) (1.88 m) tall and weighed 202 pounds (92 kg), and threw and batted right-handed.

Lock signed with the New York Yankees in 1958 but never appeared in an MLB game for the team. Instead, he was recalled from the Triple-A Richmond Virginians on July 11, 1962, and traded to Washington for veteran first baseman and pinch hitter Dale Long. Lock played left field for Washington that season, but by early 1963 he became the Senators' regular center fielder, supplanting the colorful Jimmy Piersall, who was traded to the New York Mets.

His two most productive seasons were 1963 and 1964, when he hit 27 and 28 home runs and drove home 82 and 80 runs batted in respectively. Lock led American League center fielders in put-outs, assists and double plays turned in 1963, and all AL outfielders in assists the following year. As a batter, he finished second in the league in strikeouts in both 1963 and 1964.

Overall, Lock appeared in 921 games over eight seasons, batting .238 with 122 home runs and 373 RBI. He managed in the Red Sox farm system for two seasons (1971–72, with the Winston-Salem Red Sox and Pawtucket Red Sox), and in part of 1973 for the Wilson Pennants, a co-op team in the Carolina League, after his playing career ended.

Preceded by Billy Gardner	Pawtucket Red Sox (Eastern League) manager 1972	Succeeded by Darrell Johnson (as manager of Triple-A PawSox)
