= Burlington Athletic Stadium =

Baseball park in Burlington, NC, USA

Coordinates: 36°5′17″N 79°24′30″W

- Interactive map of Burlington Athletic Stadium
- Former names: Fairchild Stadium; League Park (Danville, VA)
- Address: 1450 Graham Street
- Location: Burlington, NC
- Owner: City of Burlington, NC
- Operator: Knuckleball Entertainment
- Capacity: 3,500

Tenants
- Burlington Indians (Carolina League) (1960–1964); Burlington Indians/Royals (Appalachian League) (1986–2020); Burlington Sock Puppets (Appalachian League) (2021–present); Burlington Sock Pups (ONSL) (2024-present)

Burlington Athletic Stadium is a baseball stadium in Burlington, North Carolina. It seats 3,500 and serves as the home field for the Burlington Sock Puppets of the Appalachian League. The Sock Puppets were previously known as the Burlington Royals (2007–2020) and Burlington Indians (1986–2006) when the Appalachian League was a rookie league affiliated with Minor League Baseball prior to Major League Baseball's 2020 reorganization of the minor leagues.

Originally built in Danville, Virginia and known as League Park, the stadium was purchased in 1958 for $5,000 after the Danville Leafs folded. After being dismantled in Danville, it was hauled to its present location and rebuilt. It reopened for play in 1960. At that point, the team left their previous home at Graham Athletic Park, which is now used by Graham Middle School.

The ballpark was known historically as Fairchild Stadium, after the adjacent Fairchild Park and nearby World War II Fairchild Aircraft manufacturing plant. It played host to many games in the original Carolina League, and appears in Ron Shelton's 1988 film, "Bull Durham."

Burlington Athletic Stadium is also known to have played host to many Major League Baseball stars beginning their careers. Notable former Burlington Indians include CC Sabathia, Bartolo Colón, and Manny Ramírez. 2018 Baseball Hall of Fame inductee Jim Thome also began his career in Burlington. Historic greats who once made Fairchild Stadium their home field include another Red Sox legend, Luis Tiant, and longtime New York Yankees pitcher and coach Mel Stottlemyre. Former Burlington Royals who played at Burlington Athletic Stadium include Nicky Lopez, Salvador Pérez, and Wil Myers.

The park was also the site of the longest continuous single-game broadcast in baseball history. The 27-inning marathon between the Burlington Indians and Bluefield Orioles lasted eight hours and fifteen minutes, and occurred over two days on June 24–25, 1988. Indians' announcer Richard Musterer called the entire game for WBBB-AM.
