= Wilson Tobs (minor league baseball) =

- (1908–1910, 1920–1927, 1939–1942, 1946–1952, 1956–1968, 1973); Wilson, North Carolina

Minor league affiliations
- Previous classes: Class-A (1963–1973); Class-B (1920–1927, 1956–1962); Class-D (1908–1910, 1939–1952)
- Previous leagues: Carolina League (1956–1968, 1973); Coastal Plain League (1939–1941, 1946–1952); Bi-State League (1942); Virginia League (1920–1927); Eastern Carolina League (1908–1910)

Major league affiliations
- Previous teams: Minnesota Twins (1961–1968); Washington Senators (1957, 1960); Pittsburgh Pirates (1959); Baltimore Orioles (1958); Philadelphia Phillies (1956)

Minor league titles
- League titles: 4 (1905, 1907, 1921, 1930)

Team data
- Previous names: Wilson Pennants (1973); Wilson Tobs (1939–1942, 1946–1952, 1956–1968); Wilson Bugs (1920–1922, 1924–1927); Wilson Tobacconists (1908–1910, 1923)

The Wilson Tobs were a minor league baseball club based in Wilson, North Carolina and played periodically between 1908 and 1973. The Tobs nickname was a shortened form of the word "tobacconists". From 1908 to 1910, the team was officially known as the Wilson Tobacconists and played in the Eastern Carolina League. The club won the league's championship in 1909 and they were in the championship series in 1908, when play was suspended due to a tropical storm. They then next spent eight seasons in the Virginia League. During the 1920–1922 and 1924–1927 seasons the team was known as the Wilson Bugs. They won the Virginia League championship in 1922 and 1923. From 1939 to 1952, the renamed Wilson Tobs were also a member of the Class D Coastal Plain League, winning that league's championship in 1941. The 1941 Tobs were recognized as one of the 100 greatest minor league teams of all time. In 1942, the team played in the Bi-State League.

The team also played in the Carolina League from 1956 to 1968, winning the league championship in 1959, 1961, and 1963. The 1966 team had future Hall of Fame member Rod Carew in their line-up. Wilson returned to the Carolina League for one season in 1973 as the Wilson Pennants.

Currently, a summer collegiate baseball team plays at Fleming Stadium as the Wilson Tobs.

== Notable Wilson Alumni ==
Hall of Fame Alumni

- Rod Carew (1966) Inducted, 1990

Notable Alumni

- Ted Abernathy (1973)
- Donn Clendenon (1959) 1969 World Series Most Valuable Player
- Ripper Collins (1923) 3 x MLB All-Star; 1934 NL Home Run Leader
- Jack Fisher (1958)
- Jimmie Hall (1957) 2 x MLB All-Star
- Pat Kelly (1964-1965) MLB All-Star
- Jack McKeon (1960-1961, MGR) Manager: 2003 World Series Champion - Florida Marlins
- Charlie Manuel (1965-1966) Manager: 2008 World Series Champion - Philadelphia Phillies
- George Mitterwald (1966)
- William D. Mullins (1957) member of the Massachusetts House of Representatives
- Cal Ripken Sr. (1958)
- Rich Rollins (1960) 2 x MLB All-Star
- Lee Stange (1960)
- Bob Veale (1959) 2 x MLB All-Star; threw a no-hitter for Wilson in 1959

== Seasons ==
Year	Record	Finish	Manager	Notes
1908	36-18	1st	Earl Holt	Abandoned due to weather down 2-1
1909	50-39	1st	Earl Holt	League Champs
1910	44-39	2nd	Charles McGeehan	
1923	70-52	1st (t)	Rube Oldring	
1939	64-61	6th	Frank Rodgers	
1940	77-49	1st	Frank Rodgers	Lost in 1st round
1941	87-30	1st	Bill Herring	League Champs
1942	69-53	1st	Bill Herring	Lost in 1st round
1946	67-57	3rd	Irv Dickens	Lost in 1st round
1947	79-61	1st	Max Wilson	Lost League Finals
1948	61-79	6th	Max Wilson / Irv Dickens / Bob Latshaw	
1949	57-79	8th	Ross Morrow	
1950	68-70	5th	Bill Herring	
1951	69-57	4th	Joe Antolick / Alfred Rehm	Lost League Finals
1952	71-51	2nd	Jake McComas / Alfred Rehm	Lost in 1st round
1956	72-79	6th	Charlie Gassaway	
1957	51-89 overall	6th	Pete Suder	Kinston moved to Wilson on May 11
1958	60-78	7th	Bob Hooper / Barney Lutz	
1959	71-58	2nd	Hardy Peterson / Don Osborn (7/14-8/13) / Hardy Peterson	League Champs
1960	73-65	2nd	Jack McKeon	
1961	83-56	1st	Jack McKeon	League Champs
1962	65-75	5th	Harry Warner	
1963	77-67	5th	Ralph Rowe	League Champs
1964	57-82	7th	Ralph Rowe	
1965	68-75	6th	Vern Morgan	
1966	72-65	5th	Vern Morgan	
1967	61-72	11th	Vern Morgan	
1968	71-68	5th	Vern Morgan	
1973	52-88	6th	Ray Hathaway (18-34) / Marshall Fox (0-1) / Don Lock (34-53)	
