= Fleming Stadium =

Stadium in Wilson, North Carolina, US

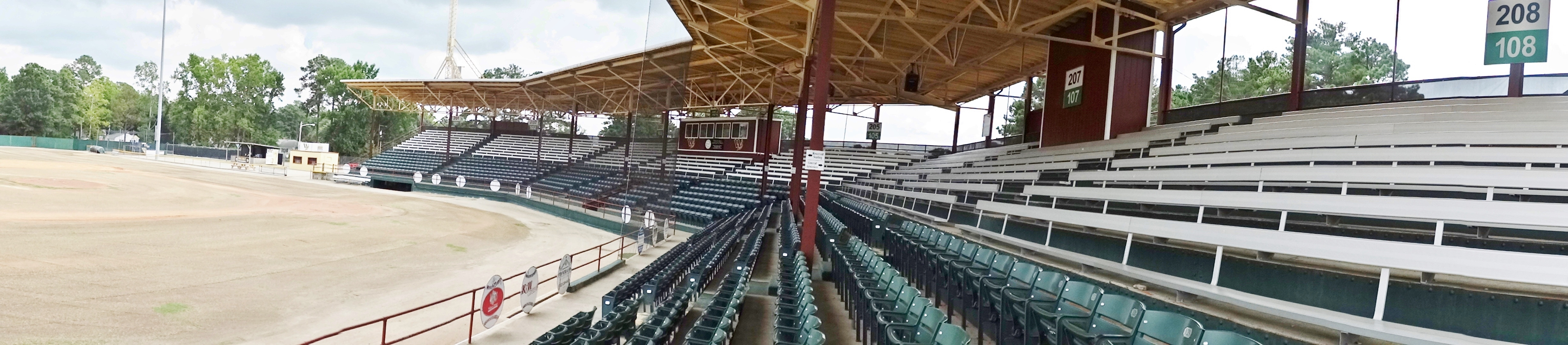
- Fleming Stadium, August 2015

- Location within North Carolina Location within the United States
- Interactive map of Fleming Stadium
- Full name: Allie W. Fleming Memorial Stadium
- Former names: Wilson Municipal Park (1939–1947); Wilson Municipal Stadium (1948–1951)
- Address: 300 Stadium St SW; Wilson, North Carolina
- Coordinates: 35.718382°N 77.930338°W
- Capacity: 3,000
- Surface: Grass
- Scoreboard: Yes
- Field size: Left field: 332 ft (101 m); Center field: 405 ft (123 m); Right field: 332 ft (101 m)

Construction
- Opened: 1939

Tenants
- Wilson Tobs/Pennants (CPL, BSL, CL) 1939–1942, 1946–1952, 1956–1968, 1973; Carolina Mudcats (CL) 1991; Wilson Tobs (CPL) 1997–2025

Allie W. Fleming Memorial Stadium is a sports stadium in Wilson, North Carolina. It is primarily used for baseball and was the home of the Wilson Tobs of the Coastal Plain League. It opened in 1939 and has a capacity of 3,000 people.

The grounds are also home to the North Carolina Baseball Museum. It also has bricks with names of the donors right in front of the museum.

The stadium has been used by teams in several different minor leagues over the decades, including the Class D Coastal Plain League, the Bi-State League, and the Carolina League. The Carolina Mudcats used the ballpark as their temporary home in 1991, before opening Five County Stadium at Zebulon in mid-season. The Tobs of the Coastal Plain League played at Fleming Stadium from 1997 to 2025, departing for Smithfield before the Wilson Warbirds began play in 2026.

== North Carolina Baseball Museum ==
The North Carolina Baseball Museum is a museum located in Wilson, North Carolina that honors those past and present Major League Baseball players and Negro league players from the state of North Carolina. The museum contains vintage baseball cards, books, and other baseball memorabilia.

The museum has a main focus on 7 National Baseball Hall of Famers that were born in North Carolina. These players include Luke Appling, Rick Ferrell, Jim "Catfish" Hunter, Gaylord Perry, Buck Leonard, Enos Slaughter, and Hoyt Wilheim. A separate room contains baseball memorabilia of the state's colleges and local high schools. The museum also provides focus on Negro league players such as Buck Leonard and women in baseball. Other signed memorabilia can also been seen throughout the museum.

The museum hosts an annual Hot Stove Dinner as a fundraiser. The first speaker of the annual dinner was Stan Musial. The museum is located at Fleming Stadium which is the home of Wilson Tobs, a collegiate summer league team in the Coastal Plain League.
