= National Register of Historic Places listings in Alamance County, North Carolina =

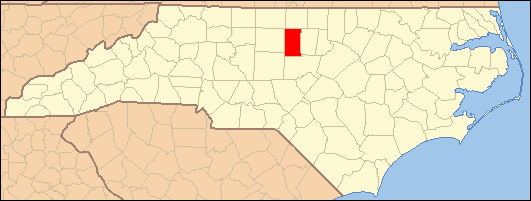

This list includes properties and districts listed on the National Register of Historic Places in Alamance County, North Carolina. Click the "Map of all coordinates" link to the right to view an online map of all properties and districts with latitude and longitude coordinates in the table below.

This National Park Service list is complete through NPS recent listings posted May 1, 2026.

== Current listings ==
	Name on the Register	Image	Date listed	Location	City or town	Description
1	Alamance Battleground State Historic Site	Alamance Battleground State Historic Site	February 26, 1970 (#70000435)	SW of Burlington on Rte. 1, off NC 62, near jct. with Rte. 1129; 36°00′27″N 79°31′12″W	Alamance	
2	Alamance County Courthouse	Alamance County Courthouse	May 10, 1979 (#79001655)	Courthouse Square; 36°04′09″N 79°24′02″W	Graham	
3	Alamance Hotel	Alamance Hotel	May 31, 1984 (#84001906)	Maple Ave. and S. Main St. 36°05′35″N 79°26′24″W	Burlington	
4	Alamance Mill Village Historic District	Alamance Mill Village Historic District	August 16, 2007 (#07000821)	3927-3981 NC 62 S, Great Alamance Creek W of NC 62S; 36°02′22″N 79°29′14″W	Alamance	
5	Allen House	Allen House	February 26, 1970 (#70000436)	SW of Burlington on Rte. 1, off SC 62; 36°00′33″N 79°31′16″W	Burlington	
6	Altamahaw Mill Office	Altamahaw Mill Office	November 20, 1984 (#84000301)	SR 1002 and SR 1567; 36°11′02″N 79°30′27″W	Altamahaw	
7	Atlantic Bank and Trust Company Building	Atlantic Bank and Trust Company Building	May 31, 1984 (#84001909)	358 S. Main St. 36°05′36″N 79°26′15″W	Burlington	
8	Aurora Cotton Mills Finishing Plant-Baker-Cammack Hosiery Mills Plant		April 13, 2022 (#100007592)	741 East Webb Ave. 36°05′31″N 79°26′00″W	Burlington	
9	Bellemont Mill Village Historic District		July 1, 1987 (#87001099)	E and W side of NC 49, S of jct. with Great Alamance Creek; 36°01′33″N 79°26′34″W	Bellemont	
10	Beverly Hills Historic District	Beverly Hills Historic District	August 5, 2009 (#09000599)	Portion of 14 blocks on N. Main St., Rolling Rd., Highland Ave., Virginia Ave., N. Ireland St., N. St. John St. 36°05′54″N 79°25′28″W	Burlington	
11	Hiram Braxton House		November 22, 1993 (#93001193)	3440 Newlin Rd. 35°52′06″N 79°19′06″W	Snow Camp	
12	Charles F. and Howard Cates Farm		September 24, 2001 (#01001025)	4870 Mebane Rogers Rd. 36°06′48″N 79°16′47″W	Mebane	
13	Cedarock Park Historic District	Cedarock Park Historic District	December 4, 1986 (#86003455)	SR 2409; 35°59′26″N 79°26′30″W	Graham	
14	William Cook House		November 22, 1993 (#93001194)	NC 2131 W side at jct. with NC 2132; 36°01′59″N 79°17′03″W	Mebane	
15	Cooper School		December 15, 1986 (#86003451)	S side of SR 2143, E of jct. with SR 2142; 35°59′30″N 79°16′19″W	Mebane	
16	Copland Fabrics		August 1, 2024 (#100010660)	1714 Carolina Mill Road. 1746 Carolina Mill Road. 1711 Carolina Road, 1717 Carolina Road; 36°07′24″N 79°24′18″W	Burlington	
17	Cross Roads Presbyterian Church and Cemetery and Stainback Store	Cross Roads Presbyterian Church and Cemetery and Stainback Store	May 22, 1984 (#84001912)	N of Mebane at SR 1910 and SR 1912; 36°10′12″N 79°17′11″W	Mebane	
18	Downtown Burlington Historic District	Downtown Burlington Historic District	September 6, 1990 (#90001320)	Roughly bounded by Morehead, S. Main, Davis, S. Worth, E. Webb and Spring Sts. 36°05′33″N 79°26′18″W	Burlington	
19	Durham Hosiery Mill No. 15		December 27, 2010 (#10001054)	301 W. Washington St. 36°05′48″N 79°16′25″W	Mebane	
20	East Davis Street Historic District	East Davis Street Historic District	April 20, 2000 (#00000393)	Roughly bounded by E. Davis St., S. Mebane St., E. Webb Ave., and Tucker St. 36°05′17″N 79°25′52″W	Burlington	
21	Efird Building	Efird Building	May 31, 1984 (#84001914)	133 E. Davis St. 36°05′34″N 79°26′16″W	Burlington	
22	Elon College Historic District	Elon College Historic District	March 22, 1988 (#88000166)	S side of Haggard Ave. between William and O'Kelly; 36°06′07″N 79°30′17″W	Elon	
23	First Baptist Church	First Baptist Church	May 31, 1984 (#84001917)	400 S. Broad St. 36°05′24″N 79°26′04″W	Burlington	
24	First Christian Church of Burlington	First Christian Church of Burlington	May 31, 1984 (#84001919)	415 S. Church St. 36°05′41″N 79°26′23″W	Burlington	
25	Polly Fogleman House		November 22, 1993 (#93001197)	4331 Brick Church Rd. 36°00′27″N 79°32′18″W	Burlington	
26	Friends Spring Meeting House		March 19, 1987 (#87000456)	Jct. of SR 1005 and SR 2338; 35°54′07″N 79°19′34″W	Snow Camp	
27	Glencoe Mill Village Historic District	Glencoe Mill Village Historic District	February 16, 1979 (#79001654)	Off NC 62 at Haw River; 36°08′27″N 79°25′44″W	Glencoe	
28	Glencoe School		December 27, 2010 (#10001055)	2649 Union Ridge Rd. 36°08′48″N 79°25′25″W	Glencoe	
29	Graham Historic District	Graham Historic District	April 7, 1983 (#83001834)	E. and W. Harden, E. and W. Elm, N. and S. Main and W. Pine Sts. 36°04′08″N 79°24′09″W	Graham	
30	Granite-Cora-Holt Mills Historic District	Granite-Cora-Holt Mills Historic District	April 23, 2020 (#100005195)	122, 180, 218, 222, 224, and 226 East Main St.; 100, 102, 104, 106, 108, and 290 Cone Dr.; 115, 121, and 205 Stone St. 36°05′26″N 79°21′48″W	Haw River	
31	Granite Mill		September 18, 2017 (#100001627)	114, 116, 122, 180, 218, 222, 224 & 226 E. Main St. 36°05′23″N 79°21′59″W	Haw River	
32	Griffis-Patton House	Griffis-Patton House	March 17, 1983 (#83001835)	NW of Melbane on SR 1927; 36°07′01″N 79°19′03″W	Mebane	
33	Thomas Guy House		November 22, 1993 (#93001195)	NC 2135 N side, 0.3 miles W of jct. with NC 2142; 36°00′34″N 79°16′06″W	Mebane	
34	Hawfields Presbyterian Church	Hawfields Presbyterian Church	December 15, 1978 (#78001926)	SW of Mebane on NC 119; 36°03′28″N 79°18′23″W	Mebane	
35	Henderson Scott Farm Historic District		September 16, 1987 (#87000411)	Jct. of NC 119 and SR 2135; 36°02′23″N 79°19′53″W	Mebane	
36	Charles T. Holt House		June 1, 1982 (#82003421)	228 Holt St. 36°05′09″N 79°22′11″W	Haw River	Designed by architect George Franklin Barber
37	L. Banks Holt House		April 18, 1977 (#77000988)	S of Alamance on NC 62; 36°01′08″N 79°29′30″W	Alamance	
38	Holt-Frost House	Holt-Frost House	May 31, 1984 (#84001920)	130 Union Ave. 36°05′59″N 79°26′19″W	Burlington	
39	Horner Houses	Horner Houses	May 31, 1984 (#84001921)	304 and 308 N. Fisher St. 36°05′59″N 79°26′12″W	Burlington	
40	Johnston Hall	Johnston Hall	March 7, 1994 (#94000130)	103 Antioch St. 36°06′01″N 79°30′01″W	Elon	
41	Kernodle-Pickett House		March 23, 1987 (#87000454)	Jct. of NC 1136 and NC 1131; 36°01′18″N 79°27′43″W	Bellemont	
42	Kerr-Patton House		December 5, 1985 (#85003083)	NC 2133; 36°01′37″N 79°18′48″W	Thompson	
43	Lakeside Mills Historic District	Lakeside Mills Historic District	May 31, 1984 (#84001922)	404-418 Lakeside Ave., Kent Ave., and 428-437 Hatch St. 36°06′18″N 79°26′21″W	Burlington	
44	May Hosiery Mills Knitting Mill	May Hosiery Mills Knitting Mill	August 26, 2016 (#16000585)	612 S. Main St. 36°05′31″N 79°26′23″W	Burlington	
45	Camilus McBane House		November 22, 1993 (#93001196)	Off NC 2345 N side, 0.3 miles W of jct. with NC 2340, 0.2 miles down unnamed rd. 35°52′43″N 79°18′49″W	Snow Camp	
46	McCauley-Watson House		February 4, 1994 (#94000022)	NC 1762 (Blanchard Rd.) SW side, 1.5 miles NW of jct. with NC 62; 36°11′23″N 79°23′48″W	Union Ridge	
47	McCray School		December 4, 1986 (#86003438)	NW side of NC 62, S of jct. with SR 1757; 36°10′49″N 79°22′48″W	Burlington	
48	Mebane Commercial Historic District		December 22, 2011 (#11000952)	Bounded by N. 3rd, E. Center, N. 4th, & W. Clay Sts. 36°05′49″N 79°16′07″W	Mebane	
49	Menagerie Carousel	Menagerie Carousel	August 30, 1982 (#82003420)	Burlington City Park, S. Main St. 36°05′03″N 79°27′13″W	Burlington	
50	Moore-Holt-White House		May 31, 1984 (#84001924)	520 Maple ave. 36°05′19″N 79°26′06″W	Burlington	
51	William P. Morrow House	William P. Morrow House	August 9, 2006 (#06000687)	NC 2146, 0.1 miles W of jct. with NC 2145 (3017 Saxapahaw-Bethlehem Church Rd.); 35°57′15″N 79°16′45″W	Graham	
52	North Main Street Historic District	North Main Street Historic District	June 10, 1999 (#99000698)	Roughly bounded by Whitsett, New Hill, N. Melville, Market, Mill and Sideview Sts. 36°04′30″N 79°23′57″W	Graham	
53	Old South Mebane Historic District		December 22, 2011 (#11000953)	Bounded by Holt, S. 1st, S. 5th, Austin, E. Wilson, & Roosevelt Sts.; also 400 blocks of W. Lee & W. McKinley Sts., 507 S. 4th St., 600-800 blocks of S. 5th St. 36°05′33″N 79°16′17″W	Mebane	Second address represents a boundary increase of December 16, 2013
54	Oneida Cotton Mills and Scott-Mebane Manufacturing Company Complex	Oneida Cotton Mills and Scott-Mebane Manufacturing Company Complex	June 9, 2014 (#14000291)	219 & 220 W. Harden St. 36°04′14″N 79°24′15″W	Graham	
55	Former Saxapahaw Spinning Mill	Former Saxapahaw Spinning Mill	May 20, 1998 (#98000546)	1647 Saxapahaw Bethlehem Church Rd. 35°56′48″N 79°19′16″W	Saxapahaw	
56	Kerr Scott Farm		October 31, 1987 (#87001850)	N and S side of SR 2123; 36°03′33″N 79°21′00″W	Haw River	
57	Sidney Cotton Mill		August 2, 2024 (#100010676)	909 Washington Street; 36°04′52″N 79°24′28″W	Graham	
58	Snow Camp Mutual Telephone Exchange Building		June 9, 1989 (#89000497)	SR 1004, .2 miles S of SR 1005; 35°53′20″N 79°25′50″W	Snow Camp	
59	South Broad-East Fifth Streets Historic District	South Broad-East Fifth Streets Historic District	December 31, 2001 (#01001427)	Roughly bounded by E. Morehead, S. Broad, Sixth, and W. Main Sts. 36°05′20″N 79°26′25″W	Burlington	
60	Southern Railway Passenger Station		May 23, 1980 (#80002800)	Main and Webb Sts. 36°05′38″N 79°26′12″W	Burlington	
61	A. L. Spoon House		November 22, 1993 (#93001192)	NC 1107 N side, 0.7 miles SW of jct. with NC 1005; 35°54′55″N 79°31′16″W	Snow Camp	
62	St. Athanasius Episcopal Church and Parish House and the Church of the Holy Comforter	St. Athanasius Episcopal Church and Parish House and the Church of the Holy Comforter	May 29, 1979 (#79001653)	300 E. Webb Ave. and 320 E. Davis St. 36°05′30″N 79°26′03″W	Burlington	
63	Stagg House	Stagg House	May 31, 1984 (#84001926)	317 N. Park Ave. 36°05′54″N 79°26′40″W	Burlington	
64	Sunny Side		March 23, 1987 (#87000457)	NC 1136, 3 miles E of jct. with NC 62; 36°01′13″N 79°28′57″W	Burlington	
65	James Monroe Thompson House		November 22, 1993 (#93001198)	NC 2158 east side, 0.1 miles south of the junction with NC 2150; 35°58′18″N 79°19′19″W	Saxapahaw	
66	US Post Office	US Post Office	September 23, 1988 (#88001594)	430 S. Spring St. 36°05′31″N 79°26′26″W	Burlington	
67	West Davis Street-Fountain Place Historic District	West Davis Street-Fountain Place Historic District	November 5, 1984 (#84000359)	Roughly Bounded by Front, W. Webb, S. Fisher, E. Willowbrook, W. Davis Sts., and Fountain Pl. 36°05′43″N 79°26′45″W	Burlington	
68	Western Electric Company-Tarheel Army Missile Plant	Western Electric Company-Tarheel Army Missile Plant	May 2, 2016 (#16000219)	204 Graham-Hopedale Rd. 36°05′51″N 79°24′22″W	Burlington	
69	White Furniture Company	White Furniture Company	July 29, 1982 (#82003422)	E. Center and N. 5th Sts. 36°05′45″N 79°16′00″W	Mebane	
70	Windsor Cotton Mills Office	Windsor Cotton Mills Office	May 31, 1984 (#84001930)	Market and Gilmer Sts. 36°05′22″N 79°25′47″W	Burlington	
71	Woodlawn School		November 29, 1991 (#91001745)	N side NC 1921 0.15 miles W of jct. with NC 1920; 36°06′39″N 79°17′43″W	Mebane	

== See also ==
- National Register of Historic Places listings in North Carolina
- List of National Historic Landmarks in North Carolina
