= Burlington Outlet Village =

Outlet shopping center located in Burlington, North Carolina

Coordinates: 36.0669°N 79.4358°W

Burlington Outlet Village is an outlet shopping center located just off I-40/85 in Burlington, North Carolina. Burlington Outlet Village, formerly known as the Burlington Manufacturers Outlet Center (BMOC), was the first factory outlet center to open in North Carolina.

The center consists of multiple buildings - the main portion of the property was originally constructed in 1981. Additional buildings were constructed in 1983. The center was renovated in 2007 & 2008. Renovations included: rebranding, new name, new logo, new marketing campaigns, new store fronts, lighting, signage, parking lots and landscaping to revitalize the center. Burlington Outlet Village is owned and managed by Anthony & Co. ONCOR International of Raleigh, North Carolina.

The mall is 24 acre large and offers 25 brand name shops.

== Location ==
Burlington Outlet Village is located just off Interstate 85/Interstate 40, with buildings visible from the highway. BOV is within an hour's drive of four of the state's five largest cities: Raleigh, Durham, Greensboro and Winston-Salem.

Access to the property is primarily from Highway 49 (one block from Exit 145 off Interstate 85) onto Plaza Drive, and secondarily from Chapel Hill Road (Highway 54) onto Corporation Pkwy.

== Events ==
The Burlington Outlet Village is host of several seasonal and local events and sales throughout the year. These events include:

- ACC Heritage Craft Fair
- Annual Hospice Auto Show and Fall Festival
- Burlington Christmas Market
- Community Collection Day
- Family Friendly Halloween
- Farmers Market
