= May Hosiery Mills Knitting Mill =

United States historic place

- U.S. National Register of Historic Places
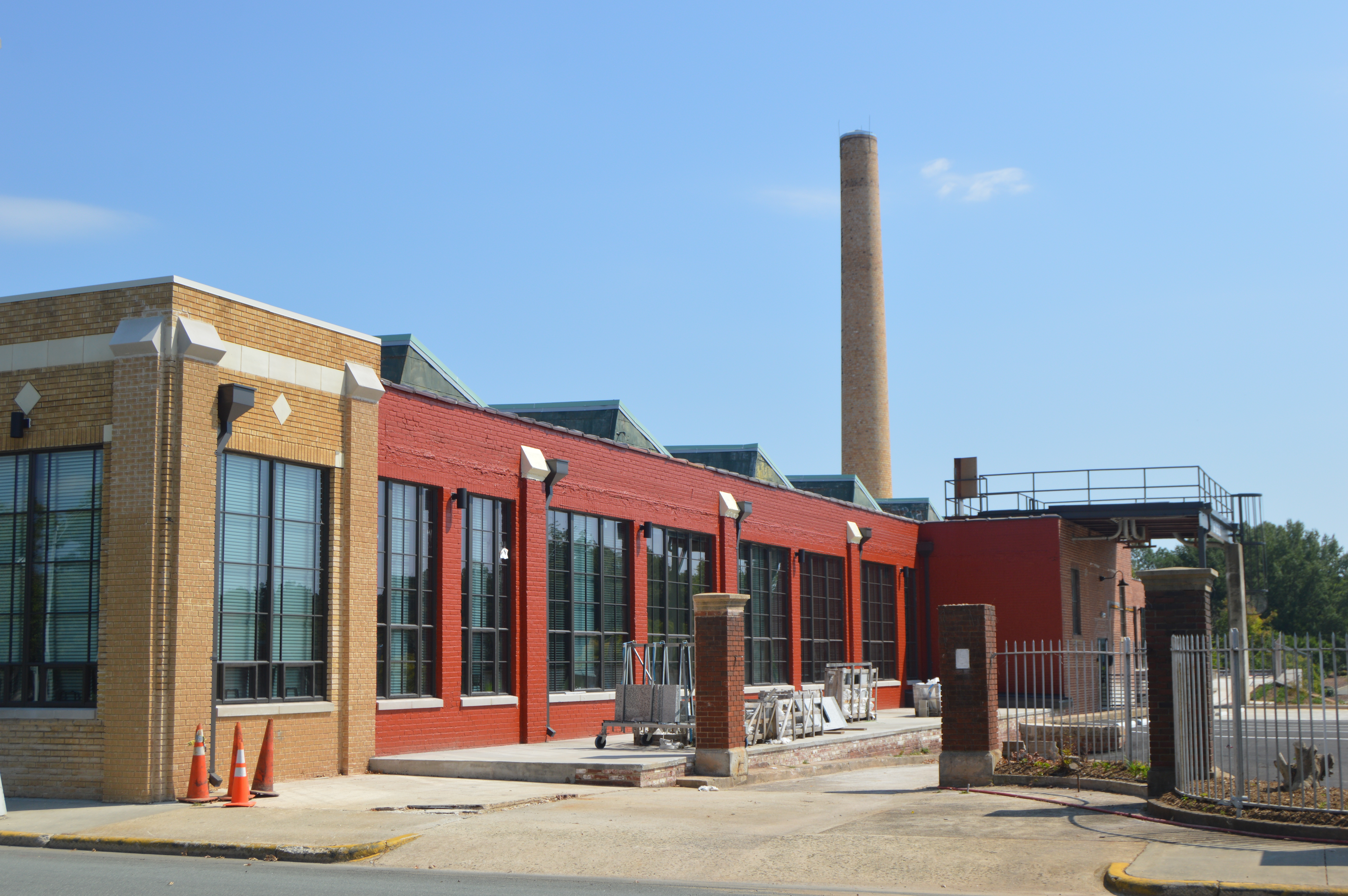
- Western side of the May Hosiery Mills Knitting Mill, now an apartment building (October 21, 2019)

- Location within North Carolina Location within the United States
- Location: 612 South Main Street, Burlington, North Carolina
- Coordinates: 36°05′31″N 79°26′23″W
- Built: 1928
- Architectural style: Industrial architecture
- NRHP reference No.: 16000585
- Added to NRHP: August 26, 2016

May Hosiery Mills Knitting Mill is a historic building that was built as an early 20th-century hosiery knitting mill in Burlington, Alamance County, North Carolina. Built in 1928, it is listed on the National Register of Historic Places.

== History ==
The knitting mill was built by William and Benjamin May in the first half of the 1900s. The structure consists of one-story-on-partial basement which is built with brick and reinforced concrete. A distinctive sawtooth roof is a prominent feature of this building which depicts an early 20th century textile mill design.
