= Menagerie Carousel =

- U.S. National Register of Historic Places
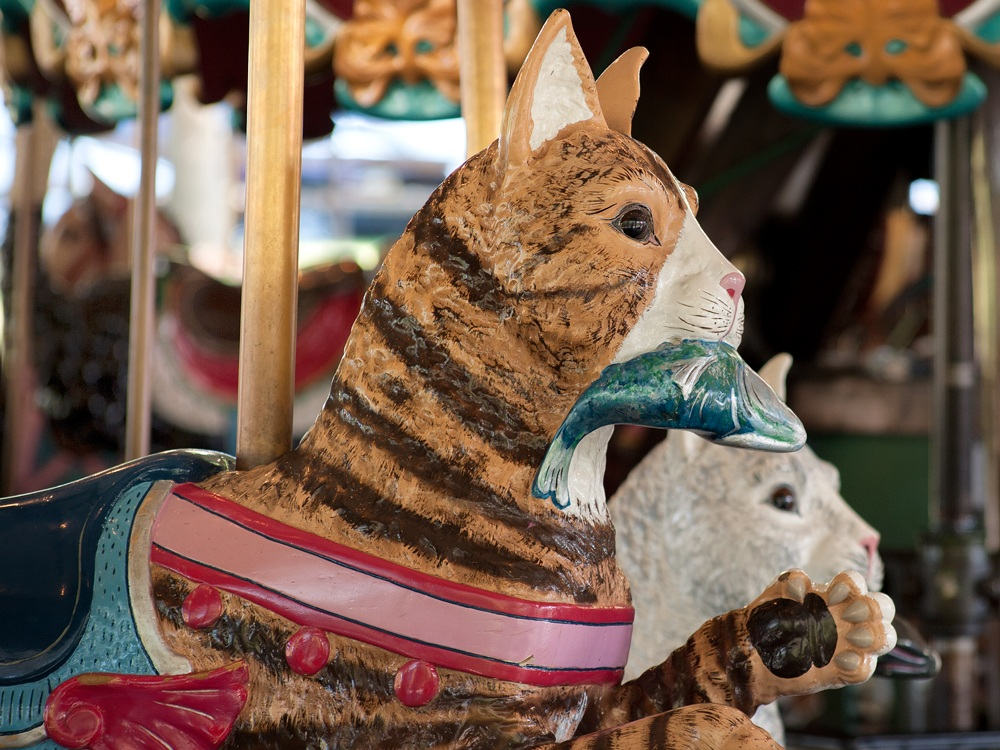

- Location within North Carolina Location within the United States
- Location: Burlington City Park, South Main Street, Burlington, North Carolina
- Coordinates: 36°5′3″N 79°27′13″W
- Area: less than one acre
- Built: 1913
- Built by: Muller, Daniel Carl
- NRHP reference No.: 82003420
- Added to NRHP: August 30, 1982

Menagerie Carousel, also known as the Burlington Carousel, is a historic carousel located at Burlington, Alamance County, North Carolina. It was built in 1913, and is a hand-carved, wooden carousel manufactured by the Dentzel Carousel Company of Philadelphia, Pennsylvania. The carousel features 46 animals include one lion, one tiger, one giraffe, one reindeer, four pigs, four rabbits, four ostriches, four cats and 26 horses. The carousel also has two chariots. Housing the carousel is a permanent shelter built in the summer of 1948.

It was added to the National Register of Historic Places in 1982.

== See also ==
- Amusement rides on the National Register of Historic Places
- National Register of Historic Places listings in Alamance County, North Carolina
