= Burlington Boys' Choir =

The Burlington Boys' Choir was founded in 1959 in Burlington, North Carolina and serves as a performing choir and a training group for boys in the Burlington area. The choir was founded by Eva A. Wiseman (1897-1994), who was at the time director of music for the Burlington City Schools. Wiseman modeled the choir after the Vienna Boys Choir. Since the choir's founding, hundreds of boys have been educated in sacred and classical music. Choir members range in age from nine to fourteen years, and are chosen not only for musical ability, but also for maturity, discipline, and high academic standing.

The choir has traveled extensively both in the US and outside the US, has toured seven times in Europe, and performed three times in the White House. In the 2001-2002 season, the choir participated in the Canterbury Children's Choir Festival, in England, and sang Carmina Burana with the Greensboro Symphony Orchestra.

The choir is currently directed by William Allred, who has previously served as an Assistant Director of the Winston-Salem Youth Symphony from 1995-96. Accompanist for the choir is Woodson E. Faulkner, II.
