= Zack's Hotdogs =

Restaurant in Burlington, North Carolina, U.S.

Coordinates: 36.094°N 79.438°W

Zack's Hot Dogs
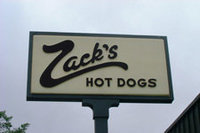
- The previous sign, prior to 2022.
- Interactive map of Zack's Hot Dogs

Restaurant information
- Established: 1928
- Location: Burlington, North Carolina, North Carolina, U.S.

Zack's Hot Dogs is a local restaurant in Burlington, North Carolina. It was opened by Zack Touloupas in 1928 and was originally named Alamance Hot Wienie Lunch. The menu began as a blue plate special, but over the years has been changed to focus on hotdogs and hamburgers. The menu has also been expanded to breakfast, lunch and dinner. Zack's used to be open seven days a week, but is now closed on Sundays.

== History ==
Burlington has been known for restaurants opened and owned by Greek immigrants. These restaurants include Gus's Drive In opened by Zack Touloupas' nephew, Gus Kakavas, Stavros Grill opened by Nick Zangotsis, Western Charcoal Steakhouse opened by Johnny Bakatsias, Mimi's Pizza opened by Jimmy Xionos and Café Nicola opened by Terry Bakatsias.

Zack Touloupas was born in the northern mountains of Greece in a village called Karpenisi. He came to America in 1919 and settled in Columbia, South Carolina. He began working at the Capital Cafe, where he heard of a restaurant for sale in Burlington. When he arrived in Burlington with his family of four in 1928, he bought and opened Alamance Hot Wienie Lunch.

Alamance Hot Wienie Lunch contained only eight bar stools and four school desks for tables. The seating capacity remained the same until 1960. The original menu was considered a blue plate special and served beef stew, pork chops and hotdogs and hamburgers. The average meal was a meat and two vegetables. Zack Touloupas' quote was, "If it tastes good to me, it tastes good to someone else."

Over the years, John Touloupas, Zack's son, had helped out at the restaurant and eventually went to the University of North Carolina at Chapel Hill and also had a stint in the army during World War II. When John got back from the war in 1946, he joined the business. One of John's main decisions while owning was to renovate the restaurant. In 1960, an expansion project increased the seating to forty-four. This was about the time when regular patrons began to refer to the restaurant as Zack's Hotdogs.

In 1971, Sports Illustrated writer Pat Jordan described Zack's as Burlington's "most famous restaurant" in the book Black Coach, which described the career of Jerome Thomas Evans, the first African-American football coach in the South, who became head football coach and assistant principal at Walter M. Williams High School in 1970 (Black Coach, p. 42).

In 1977, John initiated plans to build a new restaurant. These plans consisted of a new building which was on the same block as Alamance Hot Wienie Lunch. The new building was designed by local Burlington architect Vernon Lewis. Construction was completed and a grand opening was held in December 1977. The new restaurant was called Zack's Hotdogs and consisted of eighty seats. In 1978, french fries and ketchup were added to the menu. John Touloupas' son, Zack Touloupas II had begun working in the store around 1963, when he was only five years old. He joined the business soon after he graduated from UNC in 1981. John continued to work for many years, until he was unable to, but still manages to go to breakfast at Zack's every morning.

Today, Zack's still serves hotdogs and hamburgers and chilli dogs, but has also added cheese dogs and combinations. A cheese dog in terms of Zack's is just a block of cheese in a bun and a combination is a wienie and cheese together. A zackburger is also on the menu which is bread and meat combined to make the patty. All of these items can have onions, slaw and chili. The chili is a homemade recipe made by the original Zack. He also created a hot sauce, which is popular with the customers.
