= McCray School =

Historic school building in North Carolina, United States

- U.S. National Register of Historic Places
- Location within North Carolina Location within the United States
- Location: NW side of NC 62, S of jct. with SR 1757, near Burlington, North Carolina
- Coordinates: 36°10′49″N 79°22′48″W
- Area: 1 acre (0.40 ha)
- Built: 1915-1916
- NRHP reference No.: 86003438
- Added to NRHP: December 4, 1986

McCray School is a historic one-room school building for African-American students located near Burlington, Alamance County, North Carolina, United States. It was built in 1915–1916, and is a one-story, two-bay, frame building. It has a tin gable-front roof and is sheathed in plain weatherboard. The school continued in operation until the consolidation of four rural Alamance County schoolhouses in 1951.

It was added to the National Register of Historic Places in 1986.
