= McCauley-Watson House =

Historic house in North Carolina, United States

- U.S. National Register of Historic Places
- Location within North Carolina Location within the United States
- Location: NC 1762 (Blanchard Rd.) SW side, 1.5 miles NW of jct. with NC 62, near Union Ridge, North Carolina
- Coordinates: 36°12′14″N 79°20′54″W
- Area: 5 acres (2.0 ha)
- Built: c. 1850
- Architectural style: Greek Revival
- NRHP reference No.: 94000022
- Added to NRHP: February 4, 1994

McCauley-Watson House is a historic home located on Blanchard Rd near Union Ridge, Alamance County, North Carolina, United States. It was built about 1850, and is a two-story, three-bay, center hall plan, brick vernacular Greek Revival style farmhouse. It has a single-story rear kitchen ell.

It was added to the National Register of Historic Places in 1994.
