= Beverly Hills Historic District =

Historic district in North Carolina, United States

- U.S. National Register of Historic Places
- U.S. Historic district
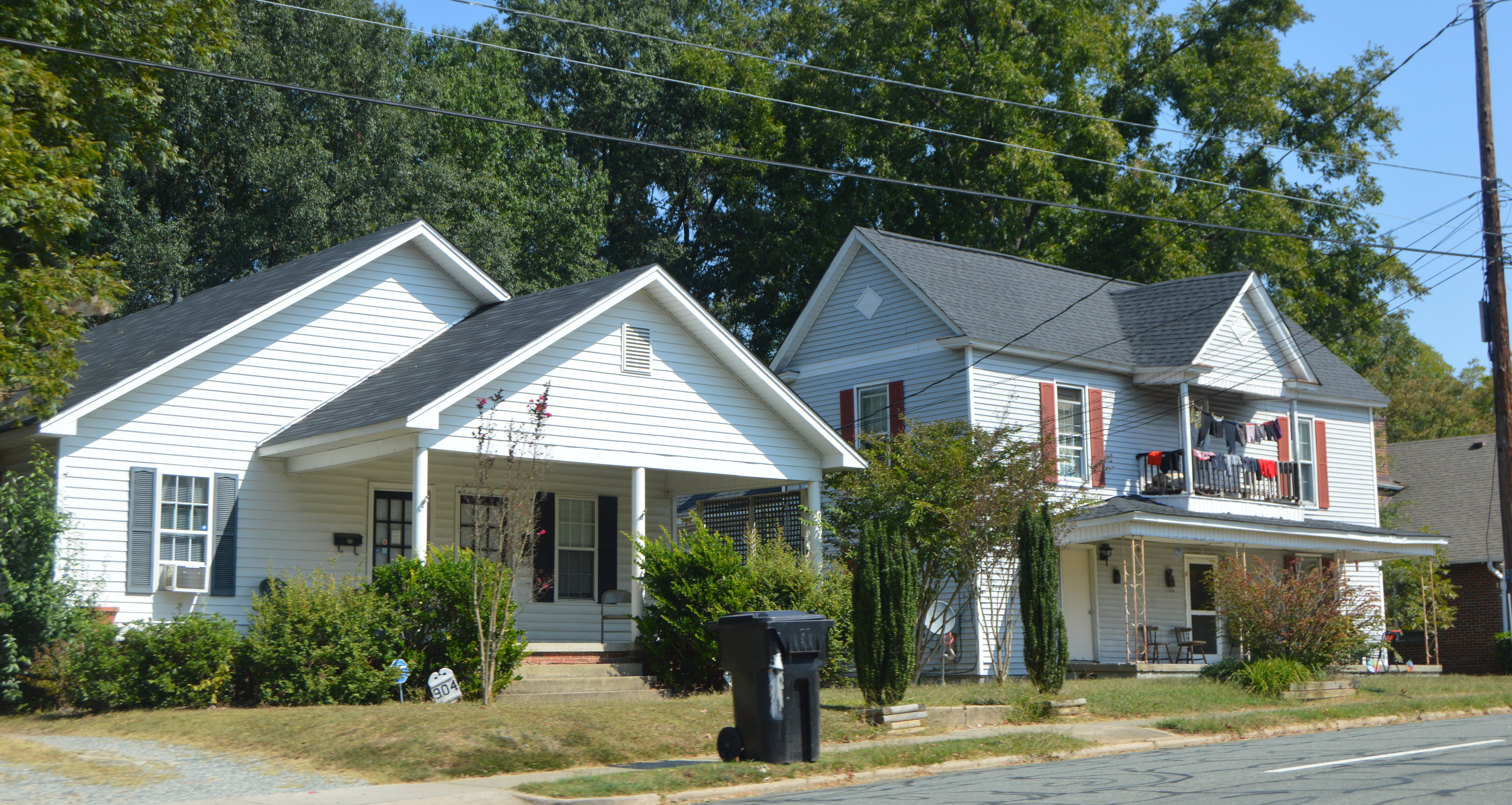
- Houses on Main Street

- Location within North Carolina Location within the United States
- Location: Portion of 14 blocks on N. Main St., Rolling Rd., Highland Ave., Virginia Ave., N. Ireland St., N. St. John St., Burlington, North Carolina
- Coordinates: 36°05′54″N 79°25′28″W
- Area: 48 acres (19 ha)
- Architectural style: Late 19th And 20th Century Revivals, Bungalow/craftsman, I-House
- MPS: Burlington MRA
- NRHP reference No.: 09000599
- Added to NRHP: August 5, 2009

Beverly Hills Historic District is a national historic district located at Burlington, Alamance County, North Carolina. It encompasses 108 contributing buildings, 3 contributing structures, and 2 contributing objects in a planned residential subdivision of Burlington. Most of the buildings are houses, one to two stories high, built between about 1919 and 1959 in I-house, Tudor Revival, American Craftsman, Colonial Revival, and Mediterranean Revival styles of frame or brick construction.

The district was added to the National Register of Historic Places in 2009.
