= Efird Building =

- U.S. National Register of Historic Places
- U.S. Historic district – Contributing property
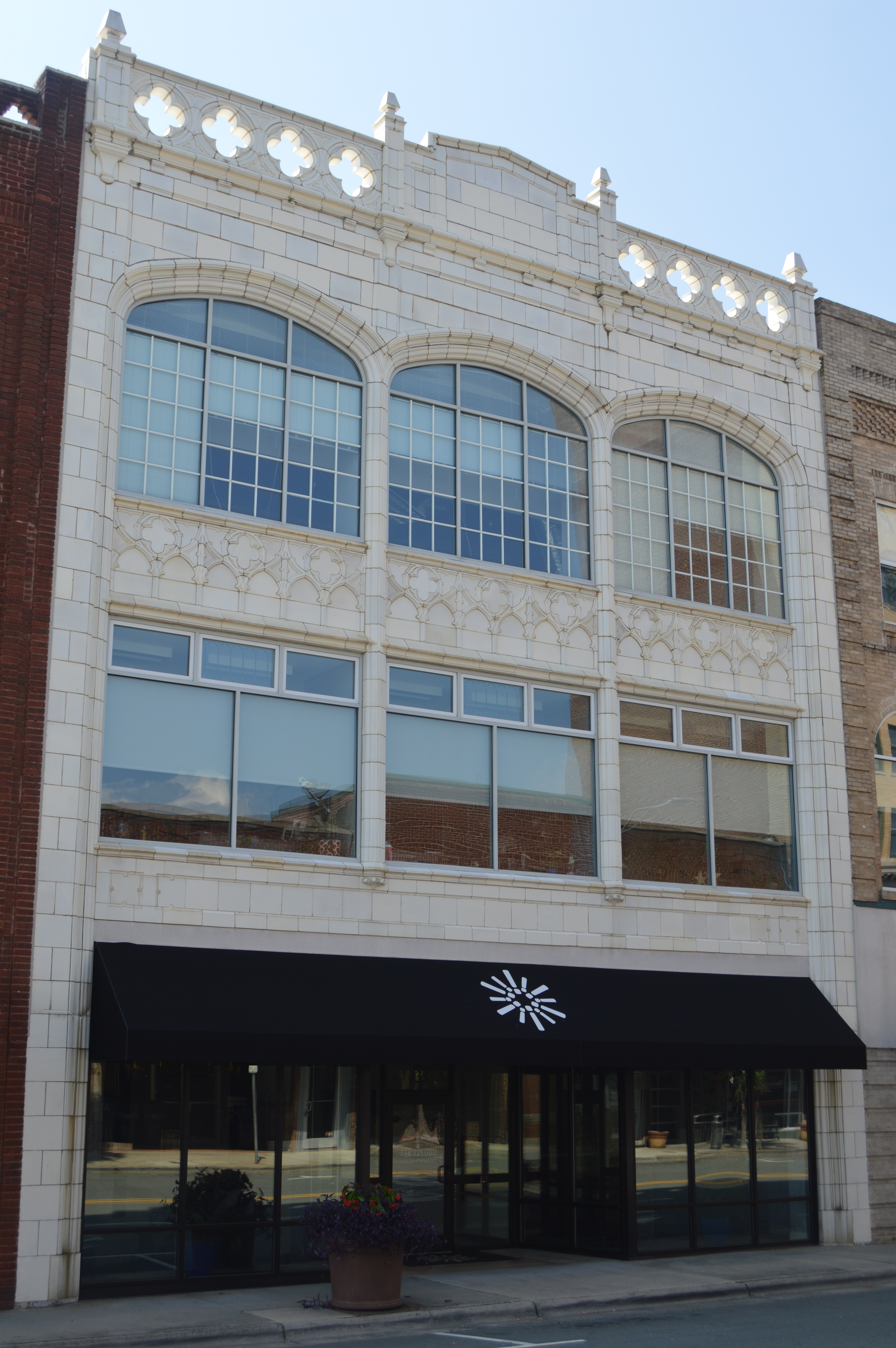
- Facade

- Location within North Carolina Location within the United States
- Location: 133 E. Davis St., Burlington, North Carolina
- Coordinates: 36°5′34″N 79°26′16″W
- Area: less than one acre
- Built: 1919
- Architectural style: Gothic Revival
- MPS: Burlington MRA
- NRHP reference No.: 84001914
- Added to NRHP: May 31, 1984

Efird Building is a historic commercial building located at Burlington, Alamance County, North Carolina. It was built in 1919, and is a three-story, Gothic Revival style building. The front facade is sheathed in white enamelled terra cotta tile. It housed a branch of Efird's Department Store based in Albemarle, North Carolina.

It was added to the National Register of Historic Places in 1984. It is located in the Downtown Burlington Historic District.
