= East Davis Street Historic District =

Historic district in North Carolina, United States

- U.S. National Register of Historic Places
- U.S. Historic district
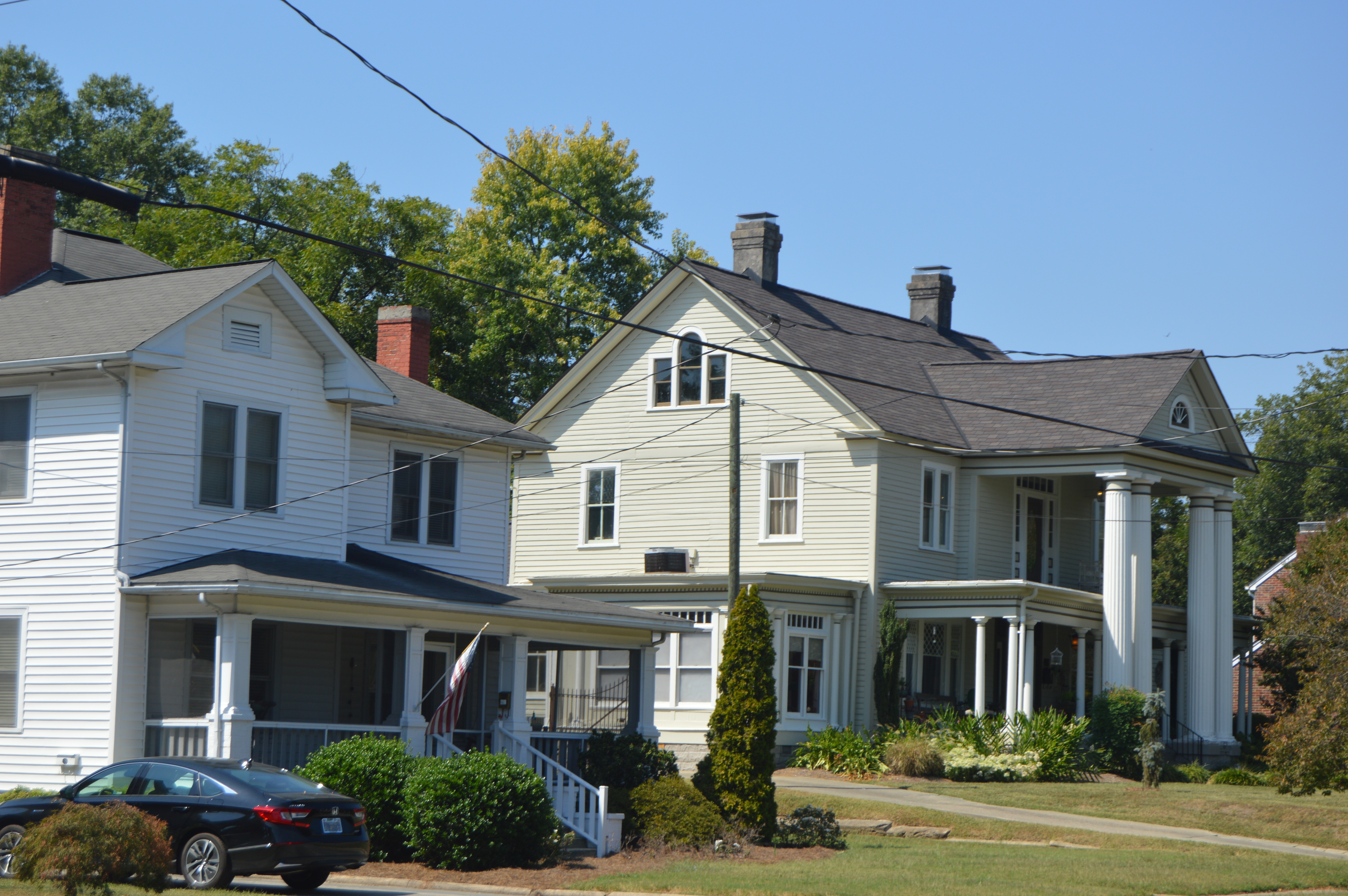
- Two residences between Cameron and Tucker Streets

- Location within North Carolina Location within the United States
- Location: Roughly bounded by E. Davis St., S. Mebane St., E. Webb Ave., and Tucker St., Burlington, North Carolina
- Coordinates: 36°05′17″N 79°25′52″W
- Area: 16 acres (6.5 ha)
- Architect: James Wesley Cates
- Architectural style: Queen Anne, Classical Revival, et.al.
- MPS: Burlington MRA
- NRHP reference No.: 00000393
- Added to NRHP: April 20, 2000

East Davis Street Historic District is a national historic district located at Burlington, Alamance County, North Carolina. It encompasses 43 contributing buildings in a primarily residential section of Burlington. It includes single and multi-family dwellings, one commercial building and one church that were predominantly constructed from the 1880s to 1950. The buildings include representative examples of Queen Anne and Classical Revival style architecture.

It was added to the National Register of Historic Places in 2000.
