= Moore-Holt-White House =

Historic house in North Carolina, United States

- U.S. National Register of Historic Places
- Location within North Carolina Location within the United States
- Location: 520 Maple Avenue, Burlington, North Carolina
- Coordinates: 36°5′17″N 79°26′1.3″W
- Area: less than one acre
- Built: 1859
- Architectural style: Greek Revival
- MPS: Burlington MRA
- NRHP reference No.: 84001924
- Added to NRHP: May 31, 1984

The Moore-Holt-White House was a historic home located in Burlington, North Carolina. It was built in 1859, and was a vernacular Greek Revival-style dwelling consisting of a main two-story front block one room deep with a porch across the front. It was one of only a few antebellum houses surviving in Burlington.

It was added to the National Register of Historic Places in 1984.
