= First Baptist Church (Burlington, North Carolina) =

Historic church in North Carolina, United States

- U.S. National Register of Historic Places
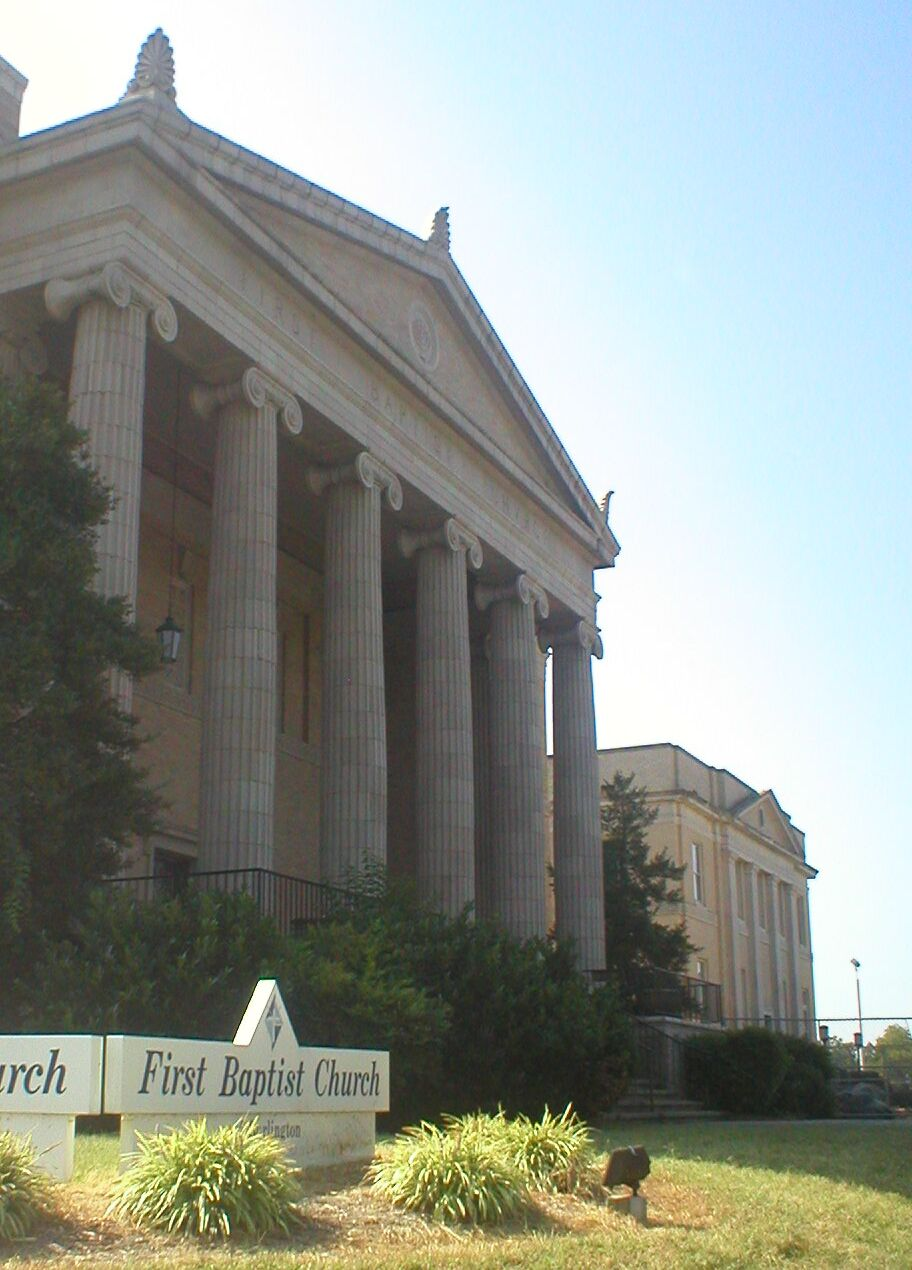

- Location within North Carolina Location within the United States
- Location: 400 S. Broad St., Burlington, North Carolina
- Coordinates: 36°5′24″N 79°26′4″W
- Area: less than one acre
- Built: 1922-1924, 1939, 1953
- Architect: Multiple; Hunter, Herbert
- Architectural style: Classical Revival
- MPS: Burlington MRA
- NRHP reference No.: 84001917
- Added to NRHP: May 31, 1984

First Baptist Church is a Baptist church located at 400 S. Broad Street in Burlington, Alamance County, North Carolina. It is affiliated with the Southern Baptist Convention. The church was built in 1922–1924, and is a two-story, brick Neoclassical Revival style church building with stone ornamentation. The front facade features an Ionic order hexastyle portico. The educational building was added in 1939 and a Sunday School and chapel wing in 1953.

It was added to the National Register of Historic Places in 1984.
