= A. L. Spoon House =

Historic house in North Carolina, United States

- U.S. National Register of Historic Places
- Location within North Carolina Location within the United States
- Location: NC 1107 N side, 0.7 miles SW of jct. with NC 1005, near Snow Camp, North Carolina
- Coordinates: 35°54′55″N 79°31′16″W
- Area: 2.2 acres (0.89 ha)
- Built: 1834, c. 1850
- Architectural style: Log
- MPS: Log Buildings in Alamance County MPS
- NRHP reference No.: 93001192
- Added to NRHP: November 22, 1993

A. L. Spoon House is a historic home located near Snow Camp, Alamance County, North Carolina. The house consists of a two-story, hall-and-parlor plan log house, with a timber frame side wing added about 1850. Also on the property is a contributing a double-pen log barn.

It was added to the National Register of Historic Places in 1993.
