= Burlington station (Southern Railway) =

- Southern Railway Passenger Station
- U.S. National Register of Historic Places
- U.S. Historic district – Contributing property
- Location within North Carolina Location within the United States
- Location: Main and Webb Sts., Burlington, North Carolina
- Coordinates: 36°5′38″N 79°26′12″W
- Area: less than one acre
- Built: 1892
- Built by: North Carolina Railroad Company
- Architectural style: Late Victorian, Victorian Tudor
- NRHP reference No.: 80002800
- Added to NRHP: May 23, 1980

Southern Railway Passenger Station is a historic train station located at Burlington, Alamance County, North Carolina. It was built in 1892 by the North Carolina Railroad, and is a rectangular, one story red brick and wood building in a Victorian Tudor style. It features a hipped roof with flared eaves, decorative brackets, and an octagonal tower and two triangular dormers.

It was added to the National Register of Historic Places in 1980. It is located in the Downtown Burlington Historic District.

Current Amtrak Carolinian and Piedmont service passenger trains stop at a station nearby.

Preceding station	Southern Railway	Following station
Elon College toward North Wilkesboro	North Wilkesboro – Morehead City	Graham toward Morehead City
