= Polly Fogleman House =

Historic house in North Carolina, United States

- U.S. National Register of Historic Places
- Location within North Carolina Location within the United States
- Location: 4331 Brick Church Rd., near Burlington, North Carolina
- Coordinates: 36°0′27″N 79°32′18″W
- Area: 3.5 acres (1.4 ha)
- Built: c. 1825
- MPS: Log Buildings in Alamance County MPS
- NRHP reference No.: 93001197
- Added to NRHP: November 22, 1993

Polly Fogleman House is a historic home located near Burlington, Alamance County, North Carolina. It was built about 1825, and is a tall 1 1/2-story log house measuring 24 feet, 9 inches by 16 feet. It has a rear shed roofed addition and stone and brick chimney. Also on the property are the contributing fruit drying kiln, a 1 1/2-story log storage building with an attached open woodshed, and a small log building.

It was added to the National Register of Historic Places in 1993.
