= Stagg House =

Historic house in North Carolina, United States

- U.S. National Register of Historic Places
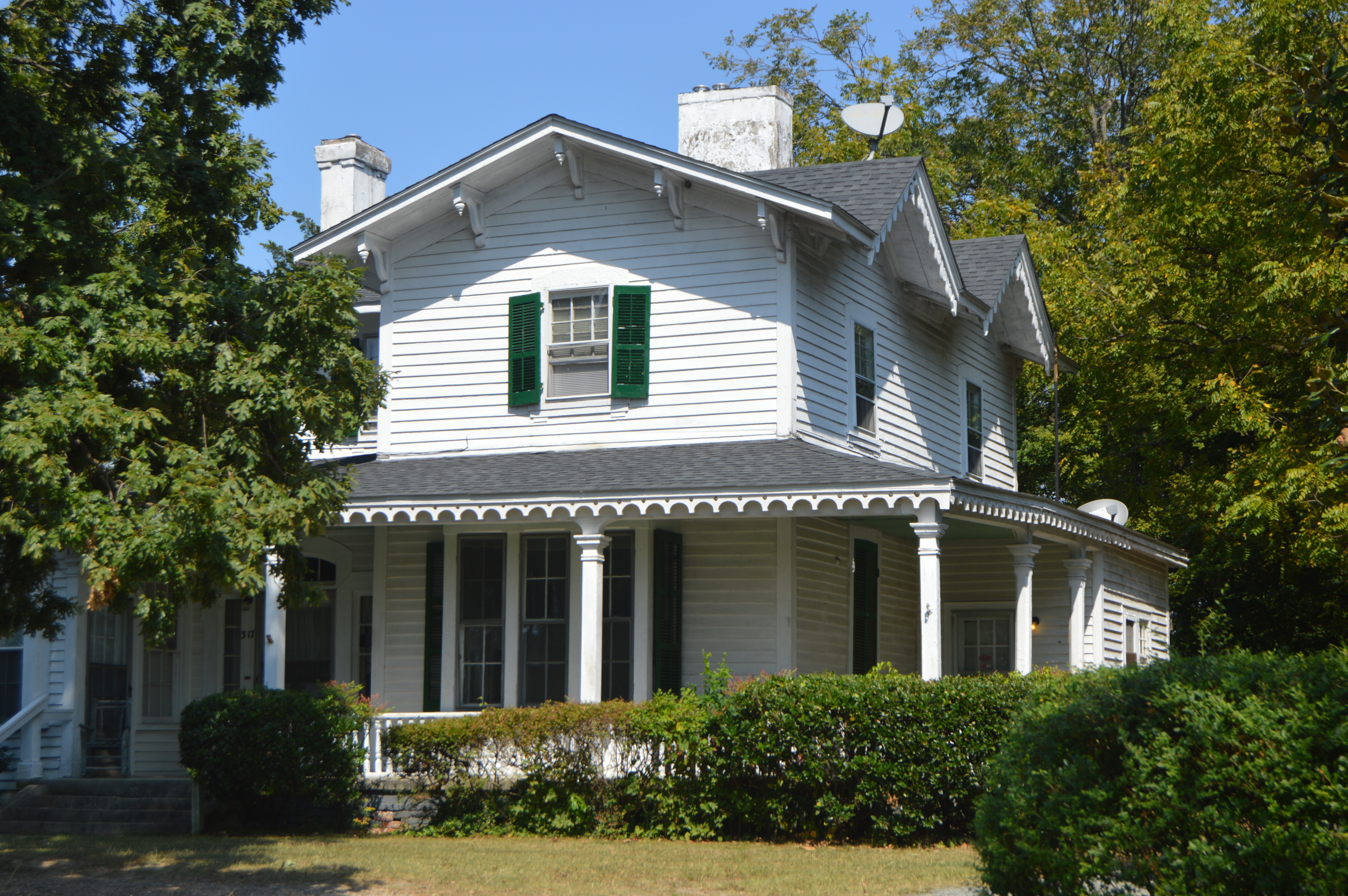
- Facade

- Location within North Carolina Location within the United States
- Location: 317 N. Park Ave., Burlington, North Carolina
- Coordinates: 36°5′54″N 79°26′40″W
- Area: less than one acre
- Built: 1857-1859
- Built by: George H. Dudley, William Ashley
- MPS: Burlington MRA
- NRHP reference No.: 84001926
- Added to NRHP: May 31, 1984

Stagg House, also known as the Dr. Bradley House, is a historic home located at Burlington, Alamance County, North Carolina. It was built between 1857 and 1859, and is a two-story, T-shaped, frame dwelling. Connected to the main block are numerous one-story wings that appear to date to the late-19th century. It has a large wraparound porch and features a rectangular projecting front bay with tall and narrow windows. It is one of only a few antebellum houses surviving in Burlington.

It was added to the National Register of Historic Places in 1984.
