= United States Post Office (Burlington, North Carolina) =

Historic former post office in North Carolina, US

- US Post Office
- U.S. National Register of Historic Places
- U.S. Historic district – Contributing property
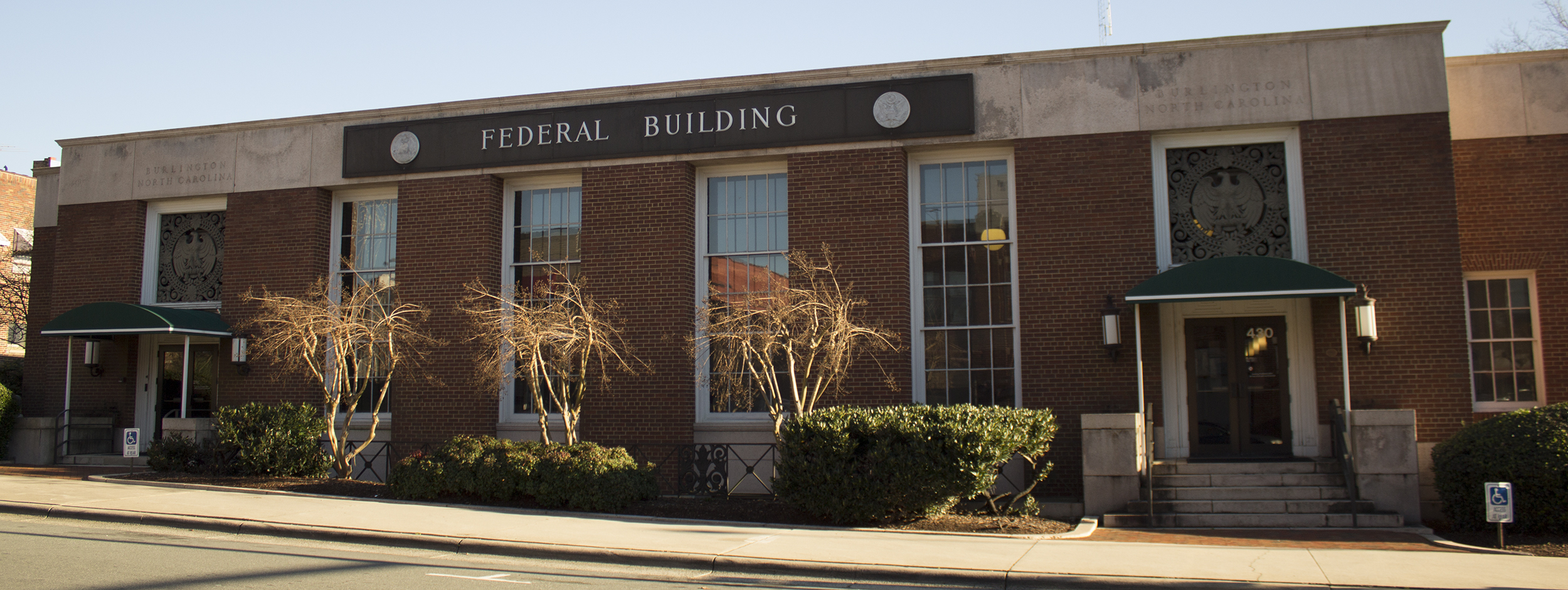

- Location within North Carolina Location within the United States
- Location: 430 S. Spring St., Burlington, North Carolina
- Coordinates: 36°5′31″N 79°26′26″W
- Area: 0.8 acres (0.32 ha)
- Built: 1936
- Architect: Louis A. Simon; R. Stanley Brown
- Architectural style: Classical Revival, Moderne
- NRHP reference No.: 88001594
- Added to NRHP: September 23, 1988

The former US Post Office, also known as the US Post Office/Federal Building, is an historic red brick post office building located at 430 South Spring Street in downtown Burlington, North Carolina. Built in 1936, it was designed in a mixture of the Classical Revival and Moderne or Art Deco styles by architect R. Stanley Brown who worked under Louis A. Simon, head of the Office of the Supervising Architect.

In the building's lobby are two wall murals by WPA artist Arthur L. Bairnsfather, which commemorate Burlington's history as a textile manufacturing center.

Since November 3, 1987, the building has been owned by Roche Biomedical Laboratories, Inc., a subsidiary of Hoffmann-La Roche, Inc.

On September 23, 1988, it was added to the National Register of Historic Places. It is located in the Downtown Burlington Historic District.
