= First Christian Church of Burlington =

Historic church in North Carolina, United States

- U.S. National Register of Historic Places
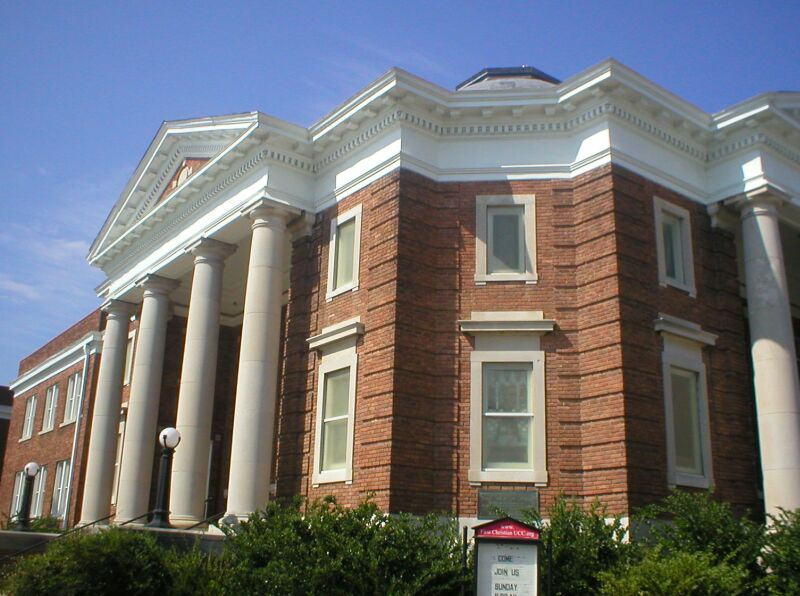

- Location within North Carolina Location within the United States
- Location: 415 S. Church St., Burlington, North Carolina
- Coordinates: 36°5′41″N 79°26′23″W
- Area: less than one acre
- Built: 1920
- Architectural style: Classical Revival
- MPS: Burlington MRA
- NRHP reference No.: 84001919
- Added to NRHP: May 31, 1984

First Christian Church of Burlington is a historic church located at 415 S. Church Street in Burlington, Alamance County, North Carolina. The church was built in 1920, and is a Neoclassical Revival style church building with an Akron Plan interior. The building features two main temple facades and a dome. A three-story educational building was constructed in 1953.

It was added to the National Register of Historic Places in 1984.
