= West Davis Street–Fountain Place Historic District =

Historic district in North Carolina, United States

- U.S. National Register of Historic Places
- U.S. Historic district
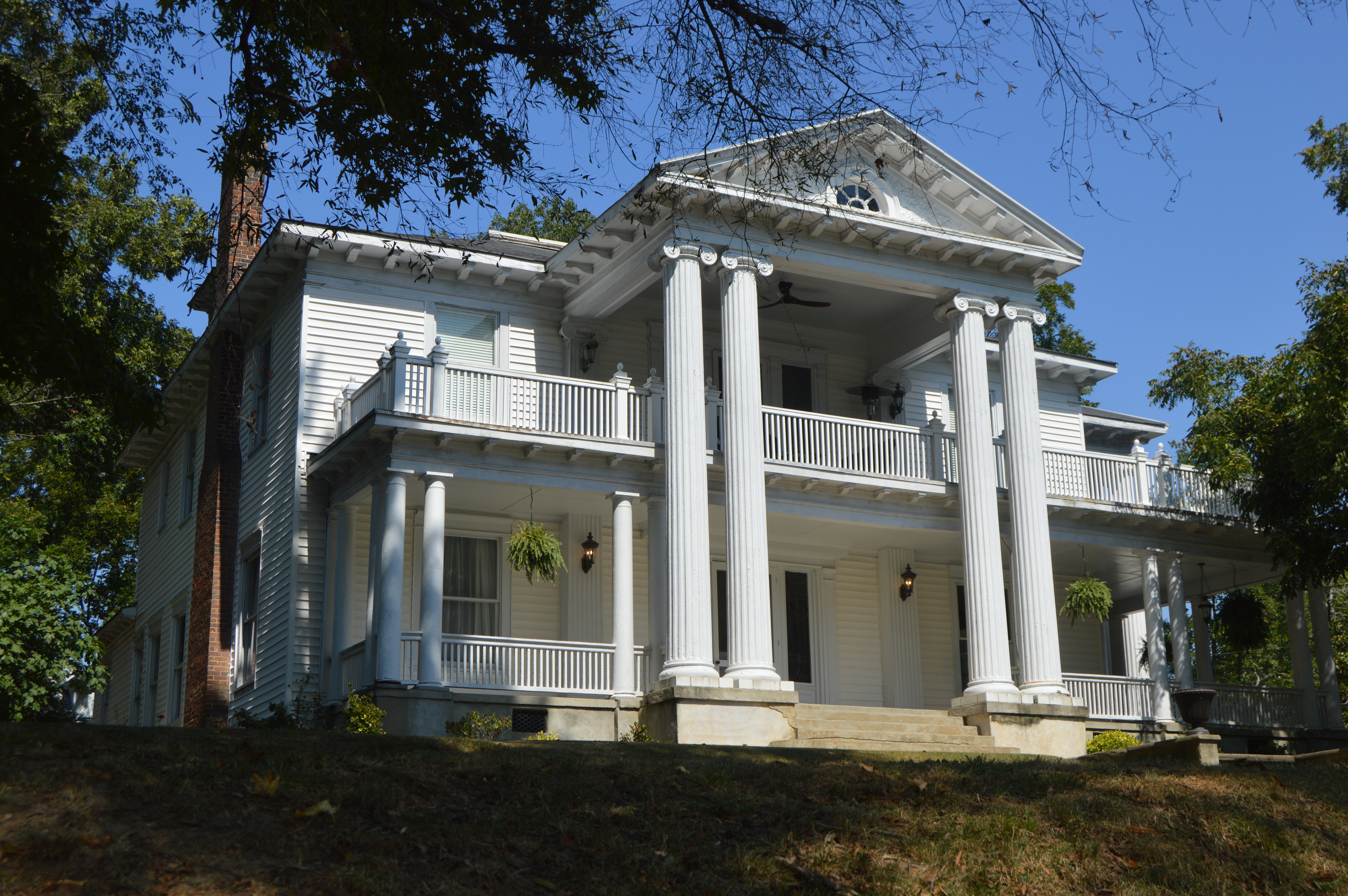
- J.W. Murray House

- Location within North Carolina Location within the United States
- Location: Roughly Bounded by Front, W. Webb, S. Fisher, E. Willowbrook, W. Davis Sts., and Fountain Pl., Burlington, North Carolina
- Coordinates: 36°05′43″N 79°26′45″W
- Area: 76 acres (31 ha)
- Architect: Multiple
- Architectural style: Late 19th And 20th Century Revivals, Queen Anne
- NRHP reference No.: 84000359
- Added to NRHP: November 5, 1984

West Davis Street–Fountain Place Historic District is a national historic district located at Burlington, Alamance County, North Carolina. It encompasses 138 contributing buildings in a primarily middle-class residential section of Burlington. Most of the dwellings date to the late-19th and early-20th century and include representative examples of Queen Anne and Colonial Revival style architecture.

It was added to the National Register of Historic Places in 1984.
