= Sunny Side (Burlington, North Carolina) =

Historic house in North Carolina, United States

- U.S. National Register of Historic Places
- Location within North Carolina Location within the United States
- Location: NC 1136, 3 miles E of jct. with NC 62, near Burlington, North Carolina
- Coordinates: 36°1′13″N 79°28′57″W
- Area: 2 acres (0.81 ha)
- Built: 1871
- Architectural style: Italianate, Gothic Revival
- NRHP reference No.: 87000457
- Added to NRHP: March 23, 1987

Sunny Side is a historic home located near Burlington, Alamance County, North Carolina. It was built in 1871, and is a two-story, T-shaped frame Italianate style dwelling with Gothic Revival style design elements. It features an ornate two-bay hip-roof front porch. Also on the property are the contributing well house and smokehouse, and the remnants of the original gardens. It was built by Lawrence S. Holt, a prominent Alamance County textile mill owner and philanthropist.

It was added to the National Register of Historic Places in 1987.
