= Windsor Cotton Mills Office =

Historic building in North Carolina, US

- U.S. National Register of Historic Places
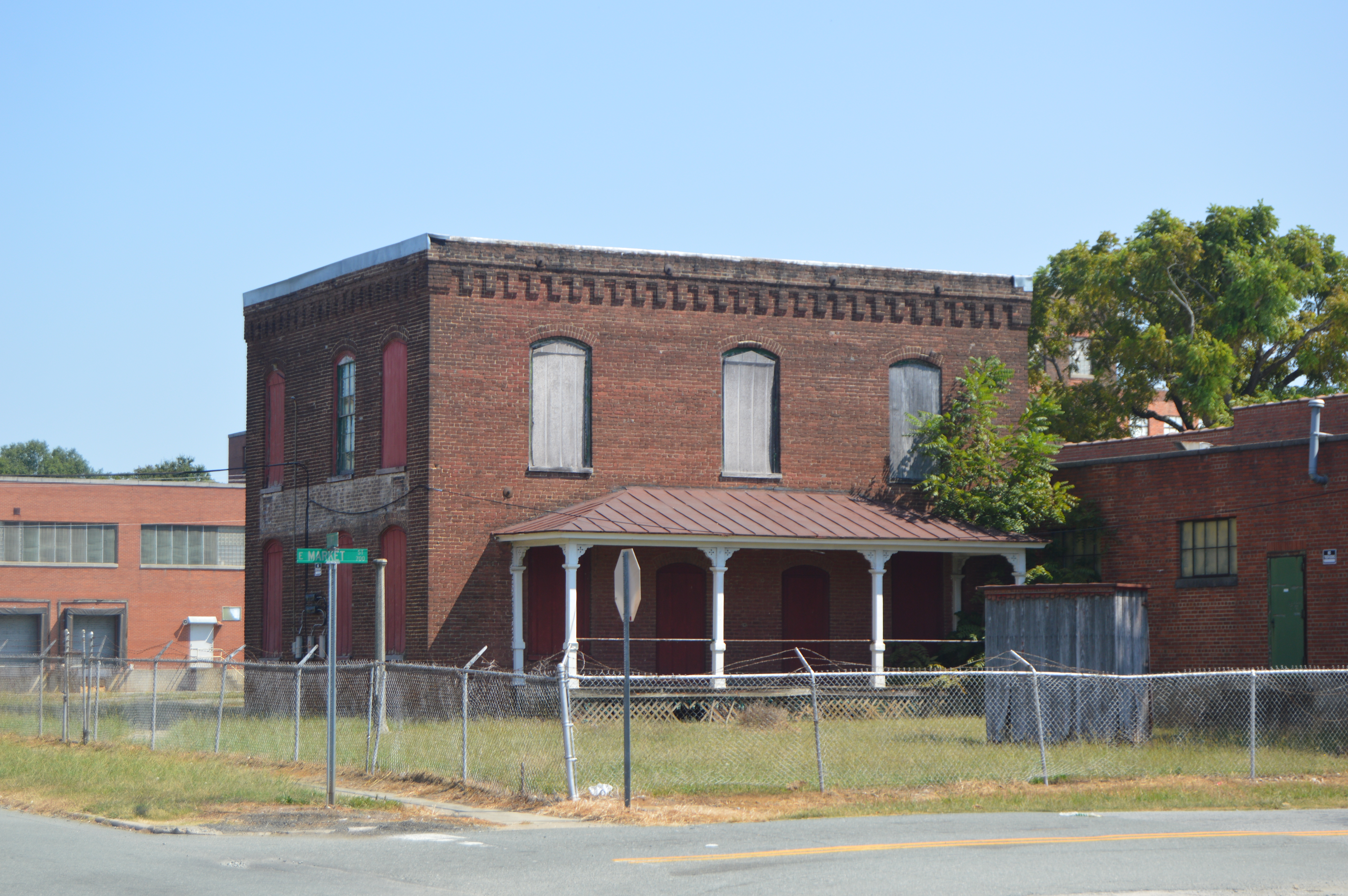
- Western side

- Location within North Carolina Location within the United States
- Location: Market and Gilmer Sts., Burlington, North Carolina
- Coordinates: 36°5′22″N 79°25′47″W
- Area: less than one acre
- Built: c. 1890
- Built by: Lafayette Holt
- MPS: Burlington MRA
- NRHP reference No.: 84001930
- Added to NRHP: May 31, 1984

Windsor Cotton Mills Office is a historic office building located at Burlington, Alamance County, North Carolina. It was built in 1890, and is a two-story, four bay by three bay, brick office building. It features a one-story hip-roofed porch that extends across most of the lower main facade.

It was added to the National Register of Historic Places in 1984.
