= Alamance Hotel =

Historic hotel in North Carolina, US

- U.S. National Register of Historic Places
- U.S. Historic district – Contributing property
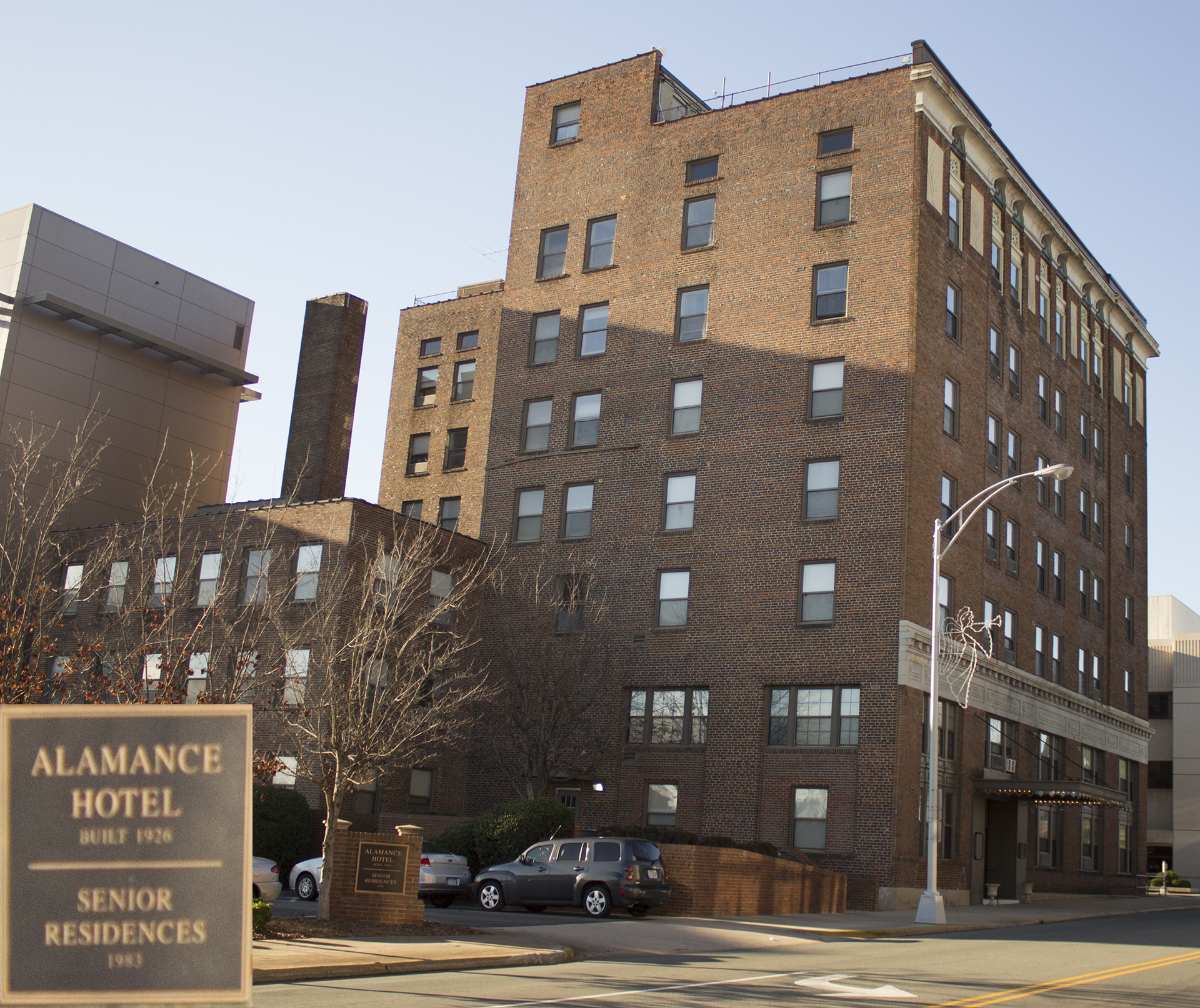

- Location within North Carolina Location within the United States
- Location: Maple Ave. and S. Main St., Burlington, North Carolina
- Coordinates: 36°5′35″N 79°26′24″W
- Area: less than one acre
- Built: 1924
- Architect: Hartmann, Charles
- Architectural style: Classical Revival
- MPS: Burlington MRA
- NRHP reference No.: 84001906
- Added to NRHP: May 31, 1984

Alamance Hotel is a historic hotel located at Burlington, Alamance County, North Carolina. It was designed by architect Charles C. Hartmann and built in 1924. It is a seven-story, brick sheathed building in the Classical Revival style. It features terra cotta ornamentation, a brick parapet, and stuccoed panels at the uppermost floor.

It was added to the National Register of Historic Places in 1984. It is located in the Downtown Burlington Historic District.
