= Horner Houses =

Historic house in North Carolina, United States

- U.S. National Register of Historic Places
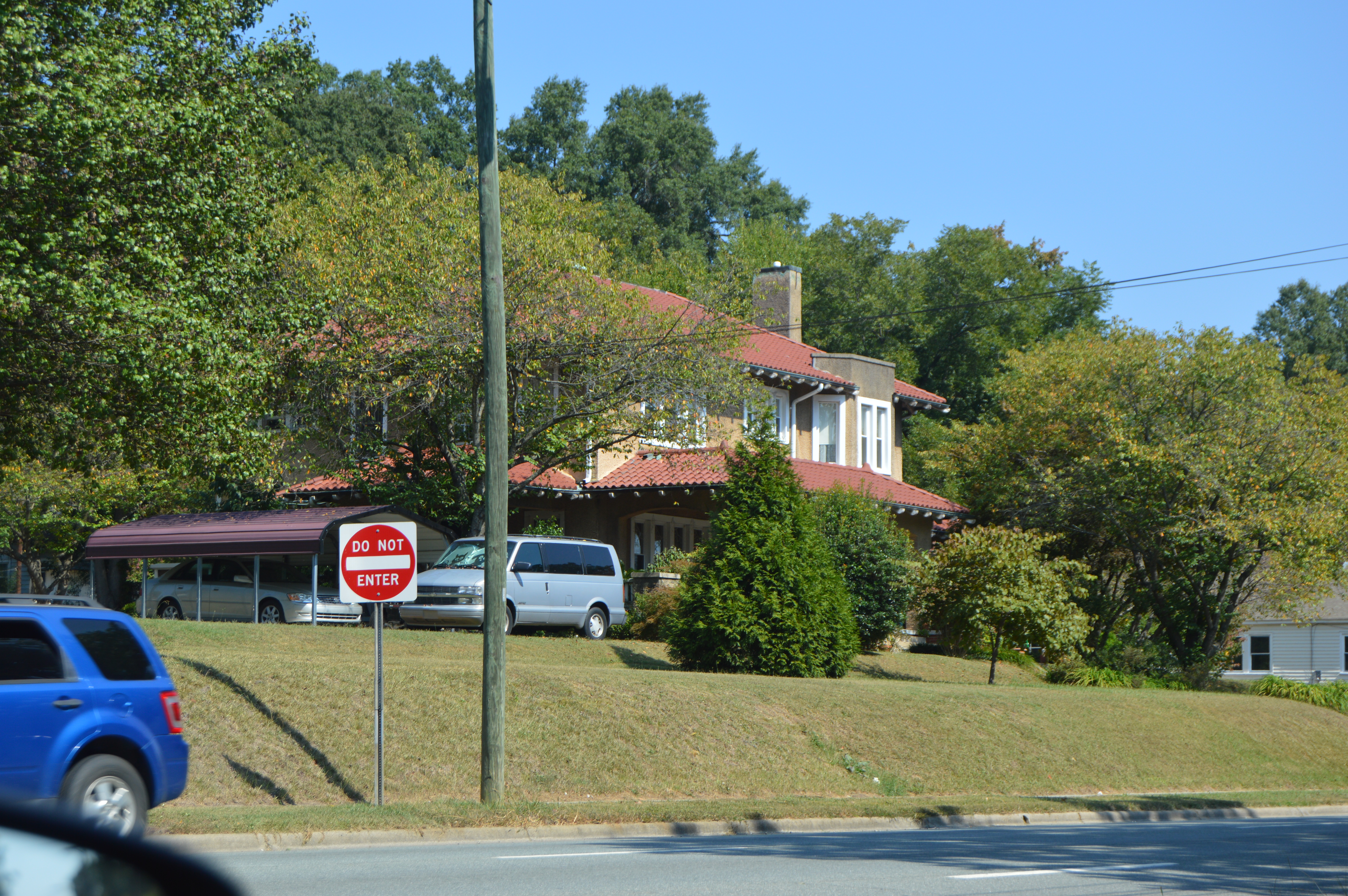
- Charles Horner House

- Location within North Carolina Location within the United States
- Location: 304 and 308 N. Fisher St., Burlington, North Carolina
- Coordinates: 36°5′59″N 79°26′12″W
- Area: less than one acre
- Built: c. 1921, 1924
- Architect: Leila Ross Wilburn
- Architectural style: Colonial Revival, Bungalow/craftsman, Mission/spanish Revival
- MPS: Burlington MRA
- NRHP reference No.: 84001921
- Added to NRHP: May 31, 1984

Horner Houses, also known as the Earl Horner House and Charles Horner House, are two historic homes located at Burlington, Alamance County, North Carolina. The Earl Horner House was built about 1921, and is a two-story bungalow form frame dwelling. It features a gable-roofed porch. The Charles Horner House dates to 1924, and is a two-story, stuccoed frame dwelling in the Mission/Spanish Revival style. It features 66 windows and porches with terra cotta tiled floors. Earl Horner served as Burlington's mayor from 1919 until 1944.

It was added to the National Register of Historic Places in 1984.
