= South Broad–East Fifth Streets Historic District =

Historic district in North Carolina, United States

- U.S. National Register of Historic Places
- U.S. Historic district
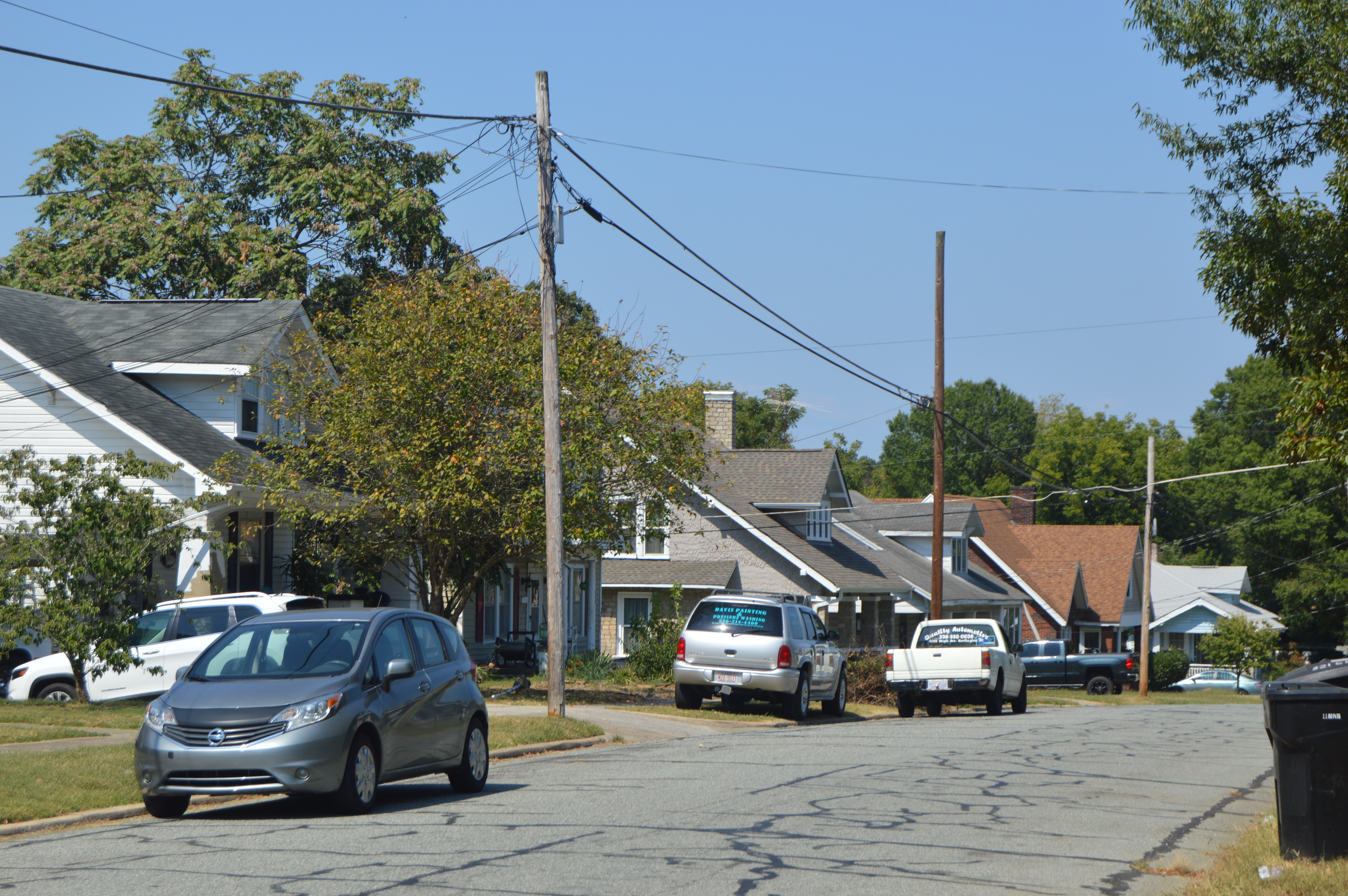
- Looking north on Fifth Street from Oxford Lane

- Location within North Carolina Location within the United States
- Location: Roughly bounded by E. Morehead, S. Broad, Sixth, and W. Main Sts., Burlington, North Carolina
- Coordinates: 36°05′20″N 79°26′25″W
- Area: 28 acres (11 ha)
- Built: 1890
- Built by: Davis, James A.R.; Mitchell, H. Frank
- Architectural style: Queen Anne, Colonial Revival, et al.
- MPS: Burlington MRA
- NRHP reference No.: 01001427
- Added to NRHP: December 31, 2001

South Broad–East Fifth Streets Historic District is a national historic district in Burlington, Alamance County, North Carolina. It encompasses 108 contributing buildings in a primarily residential section of Burlington. Most of the buildings are houses, one to two stories high, built between the 1890s and the 1940s in late Victorian, Queen Anne, American Craftsman, and Colonial Revival styles of frame or brick construction.

It was added to the National Register of Historic Places in 2001.
