= Lakeside Mills Historic District =

Historic district in North Carolina, United States

- U.S. National Register of Historic Places
- U.S. Historic district
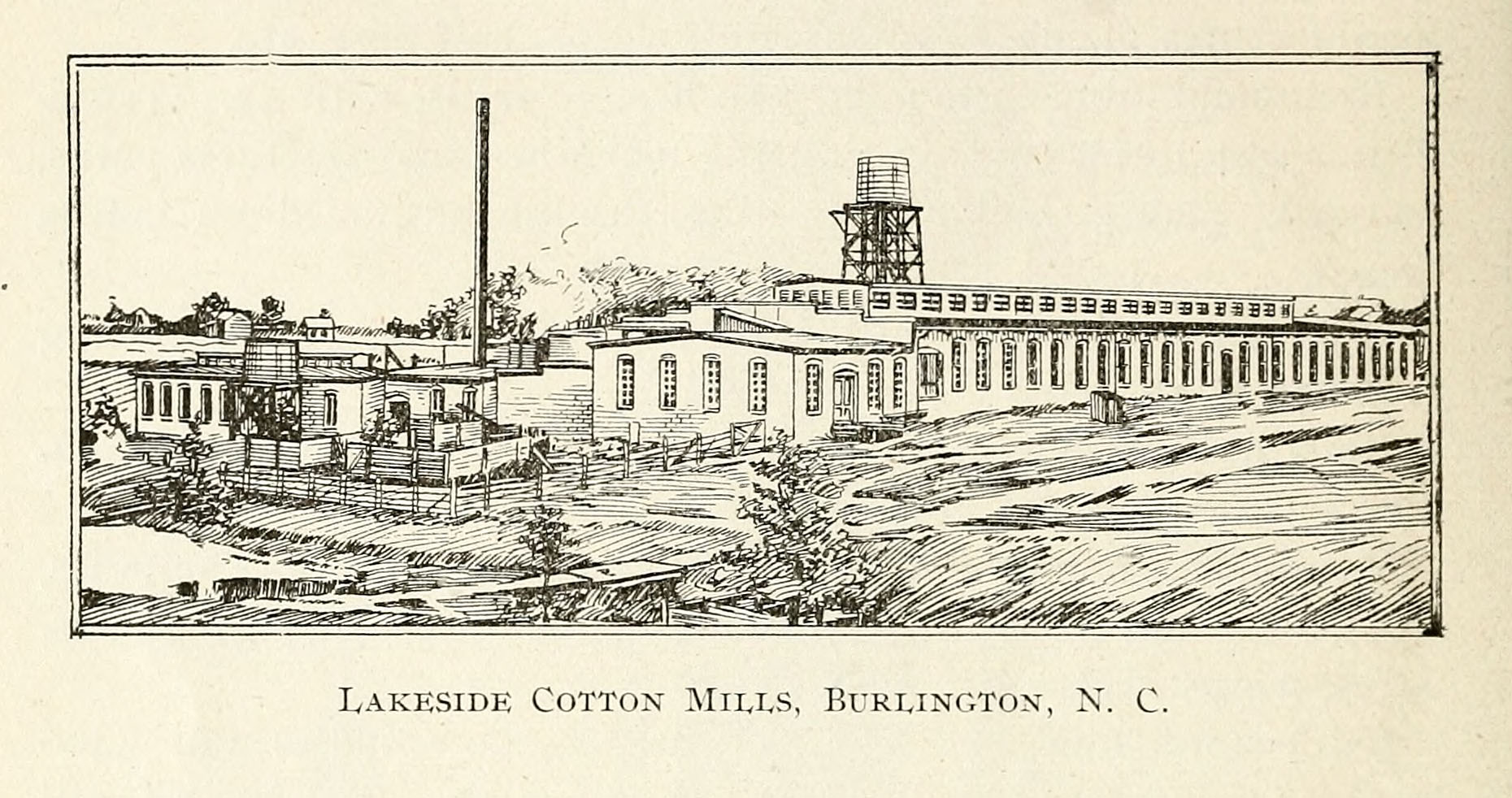
- Hand-drawn image of the Lakeside Cotton Mills

- Location within North Carolina Location within the United States
- Location: 404-418 Lakeside Ave., Kent Ave., and 428-437 Hatch St., Burlington, North Carolina
- Coordinates: 36°06′18″N 79°26′21″W
- Area: 11.5 acres (4.7 ha)
- Built: c. 1892
- Built by: Holt, LaFayette
- MPS: Burlington MRA
- NRHP reference No.: 84001922
- Added to NRHP: May 31, 1984

Lakeside Mills Historic District is a national historic district located at Burlington, Alamance County, North Carolina. It encompasses 20 contributing buildings built in the 1890s. The district includes a one-story brick mill and ancillary buildings, 16 one-, 1 1/2- and two-story frame houses, and a store building.

It was added to the National Register of Historic Places in 1984.
