= Holt–Frost House =

Historic house in North Carolina, United States

- U.S. National Register of Historic Places
- Location within North Carolina Location within the United States
- Location: 130 Union Ave., Burlington, North Carolina
- Coordinates: 36°5′59″N 79°26′19″W
- Area: 1 acre (0.40 ha)
- Built: c. 1860, c. 1889
- Architectural style: Queen Anne
- MPS: Burlington MRA
- NRHP reference No.: 84001920
- Added to NRHP: May 31, 1984

Holt–Frost House, also known as the Dr. Frost House, is a historic home located at Burlington, Alamance County, North Carolina. It is a two-story, L-shaped, Queen Anne style dwelling. It has a rear one-story wing that may date to 1860. It has a slate gable roof, multi-colored glass window panels, porches, and an abundance of sawn and turned millwork.

It was added to the National Register of Historic Places in 1984.
