= Allen House (Burlington, North Carolina) =

Historic house in North Carolina, United States

- U.S. National Register of Historic Places
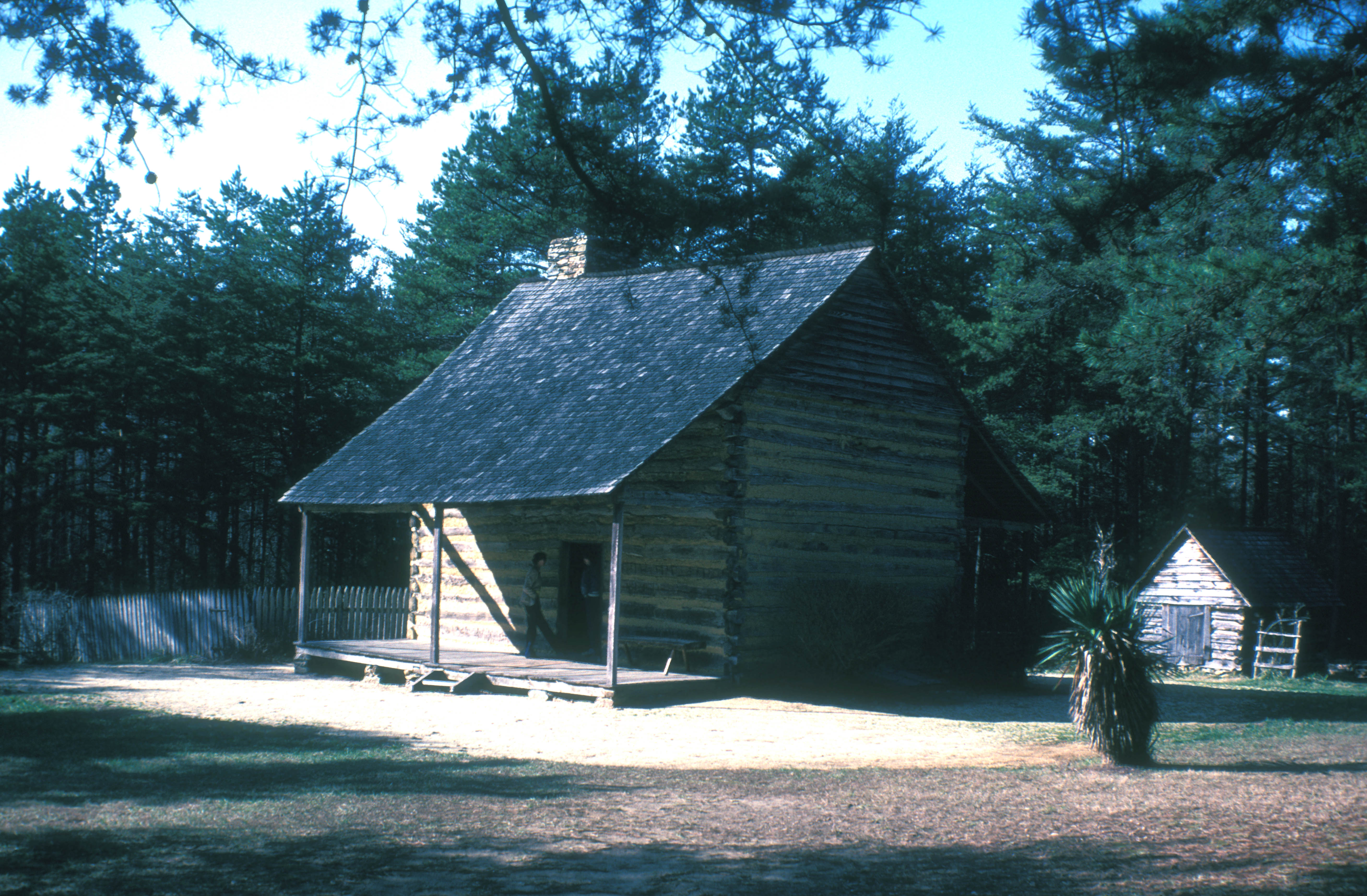
- Allen House, June 1971

- Location within North Carolina Location within the United States
- Location: SW of Burlington on Rte. 1, off SC 62, near Burlington, North Carolina
- Coordinates: 36°0′33″N 79°31′16″W
- Area: 2 acres (0.81 ha)
- Built: 1782
- Built by: Allen, John
- Architectural style: Log construction
- NRHP reference No.: 70000436
- Added to NRHP: February 26, 1970

Allen House is a historic home located on the Alamance Battleground State Historic Site near Burlington, Alamance County, North Carolina. It was built in 1782, and is a two-story, hewn log dwelling with a gable roof. It rests on a stone foundation. The Allen house was moved to the Alamance Battleground in 1966 and restored as a homestead dwelling.

It was added to the National Register of Historic Places in 1970.
