= Burlington, North Carolina =

- City
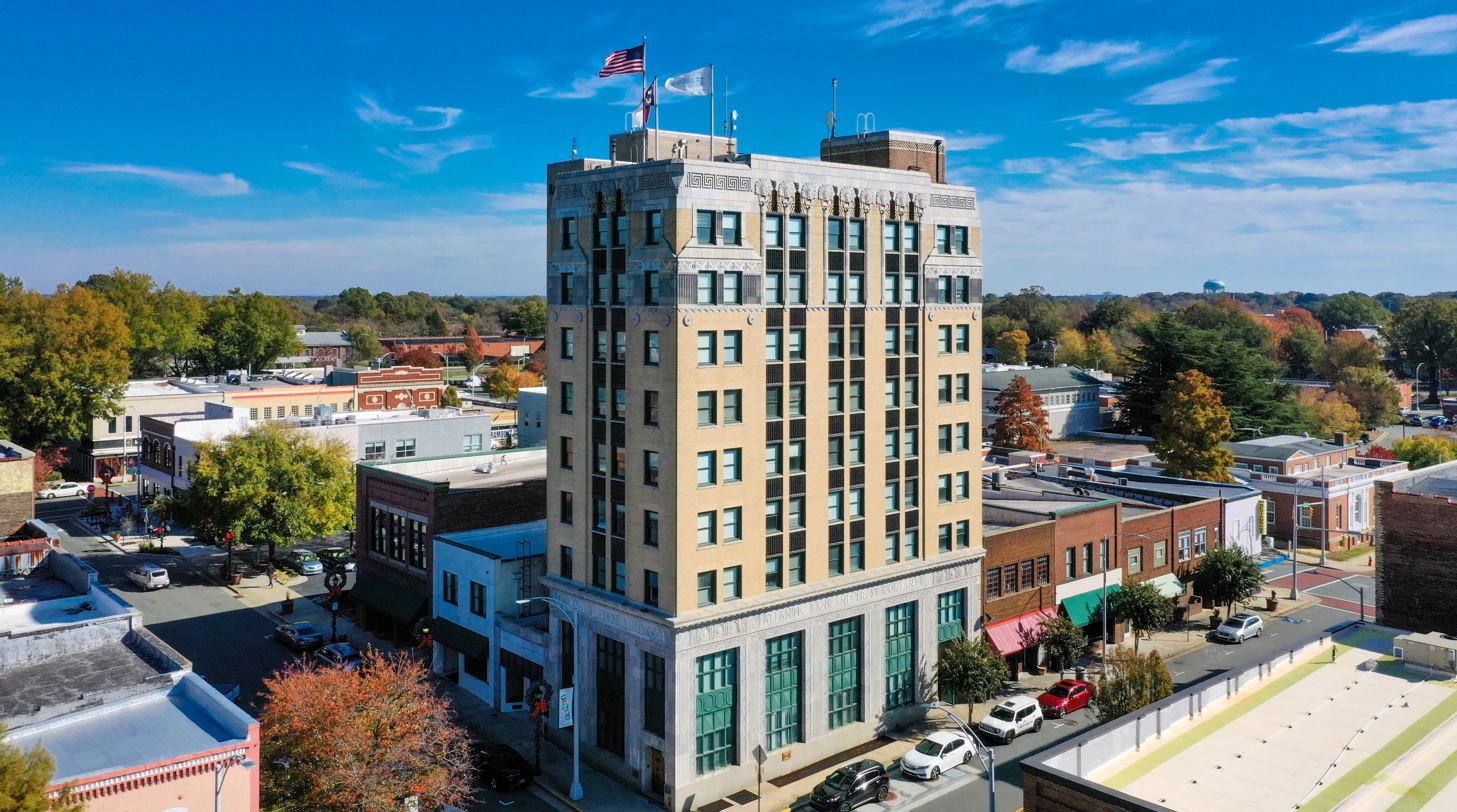
- Atlantic Bank and Trust Company Building in Burlington

- Flag Seal Logo
- Motto: "Belong in Burlington"
- Interactive map of Burlington, North Carolina
- Location within North Carolina Location within the United States
- Coordinates: 36°04′34″N 79°28′05″W
- Country: United States
- State: North Carolina
- Counties: Alamance, Guilford
- Founded: 1857 (Company Shops); 1886 (Burlington)
- Incorporated: February 14, 1893
- Named for: Word seen on a passing train

Government
  - Mayor: Beth Kennett

Area
  - Total: 31.82 sq mi (82.41 km^{2})
  - Land: 30.26 sq mi (78.38 km^{2})
  - Water: 1.56 sq mi (4.03 km^{2}) 4.87%
- Elevation: 673 ft (205 m)

Population (2020)
  - Total: 57,303
  - Estimate (2023): 60,032
  - Density: 1,893.4/sq mi (731.05/km^{2})
  - Urban: 145,311 (US: 243rd)
  - Urban density: 1,579/sq mi (609.7/km^{2})
  - Metro: 179,165 (US: 249th)
- Time zone: UTC−5 (EST)
  - Summer (DST): UTC−4 (EDT)
- ZIP Code: 27215, 27216, 27217
- Area code: 336/743
- FIPS code: 37-09060
- GNIS feature ID: 2403956
- Website: www.burlingtonnc.gov

Burlington is a city in predominantly Alamance County (with western outskirts of the city in Guilford County) in the U.S. state of North Carolina. The city is located in the Piedmont Triad, where it is the principal city of the Burlington, NC Metropolitan Statistical Area, located directly east of the Greensboro-High Point Metropolitan Area. The population of the city of Burlington was 57,303 at the 2020 census, which makes Burlington the 18th-most populous city in North Carolina.

== History ==
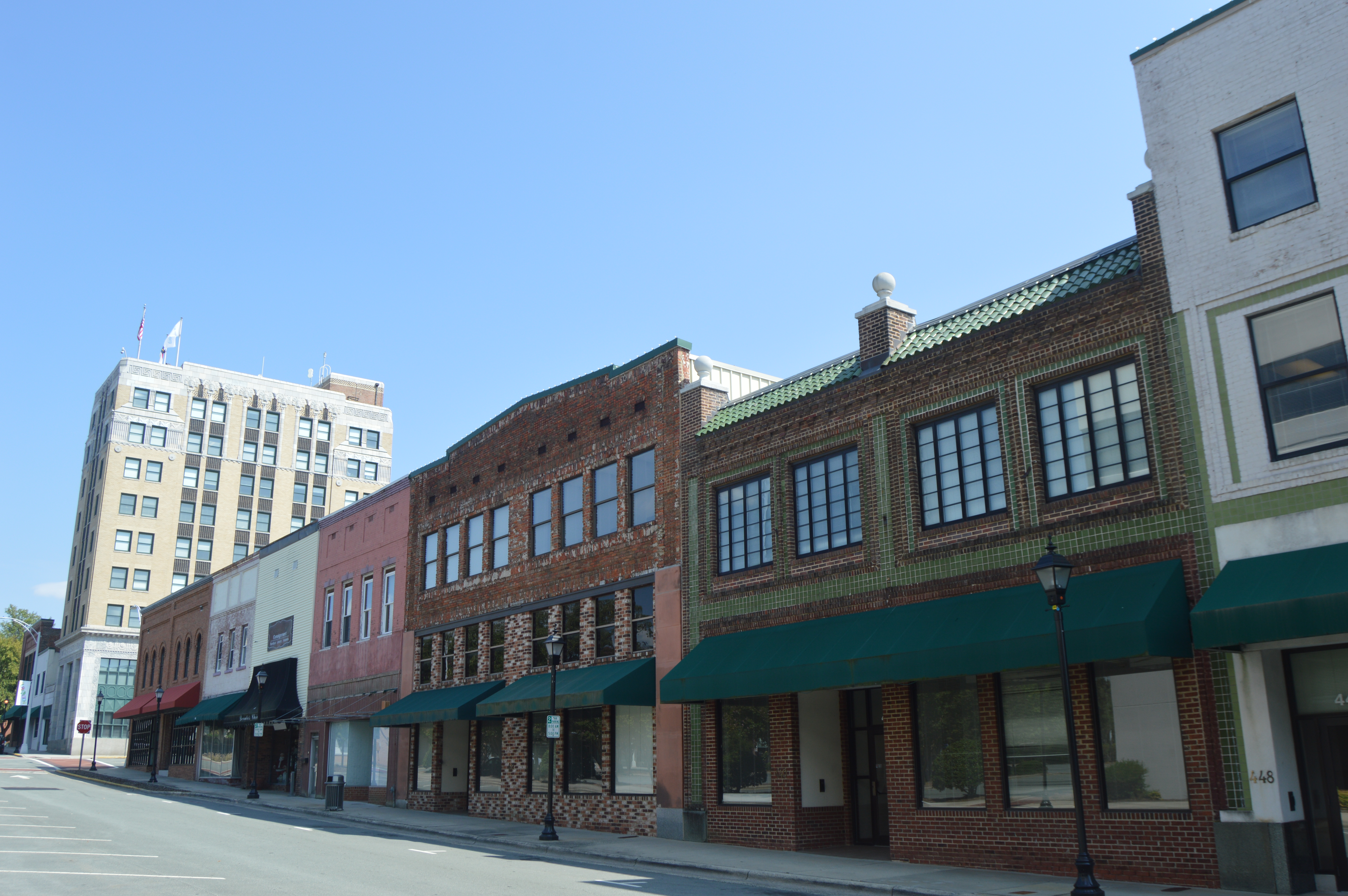
Buildings along Main Street

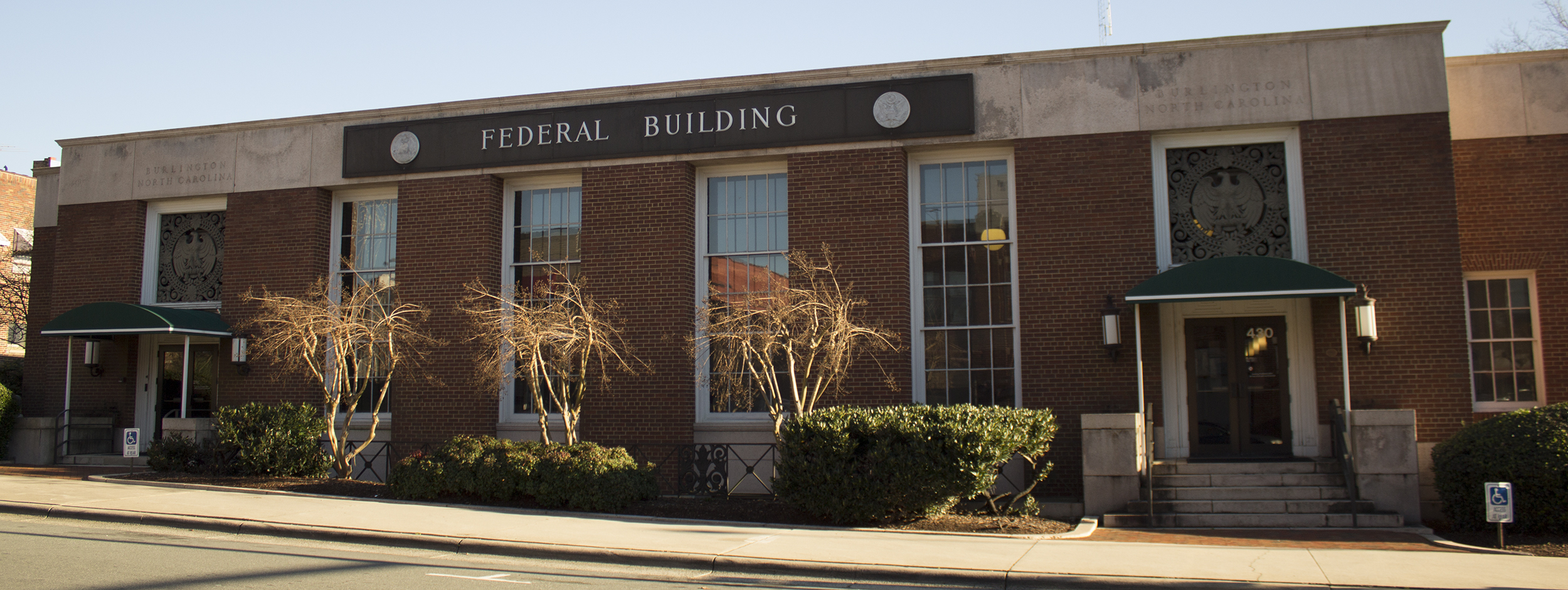
Burlington Post Office

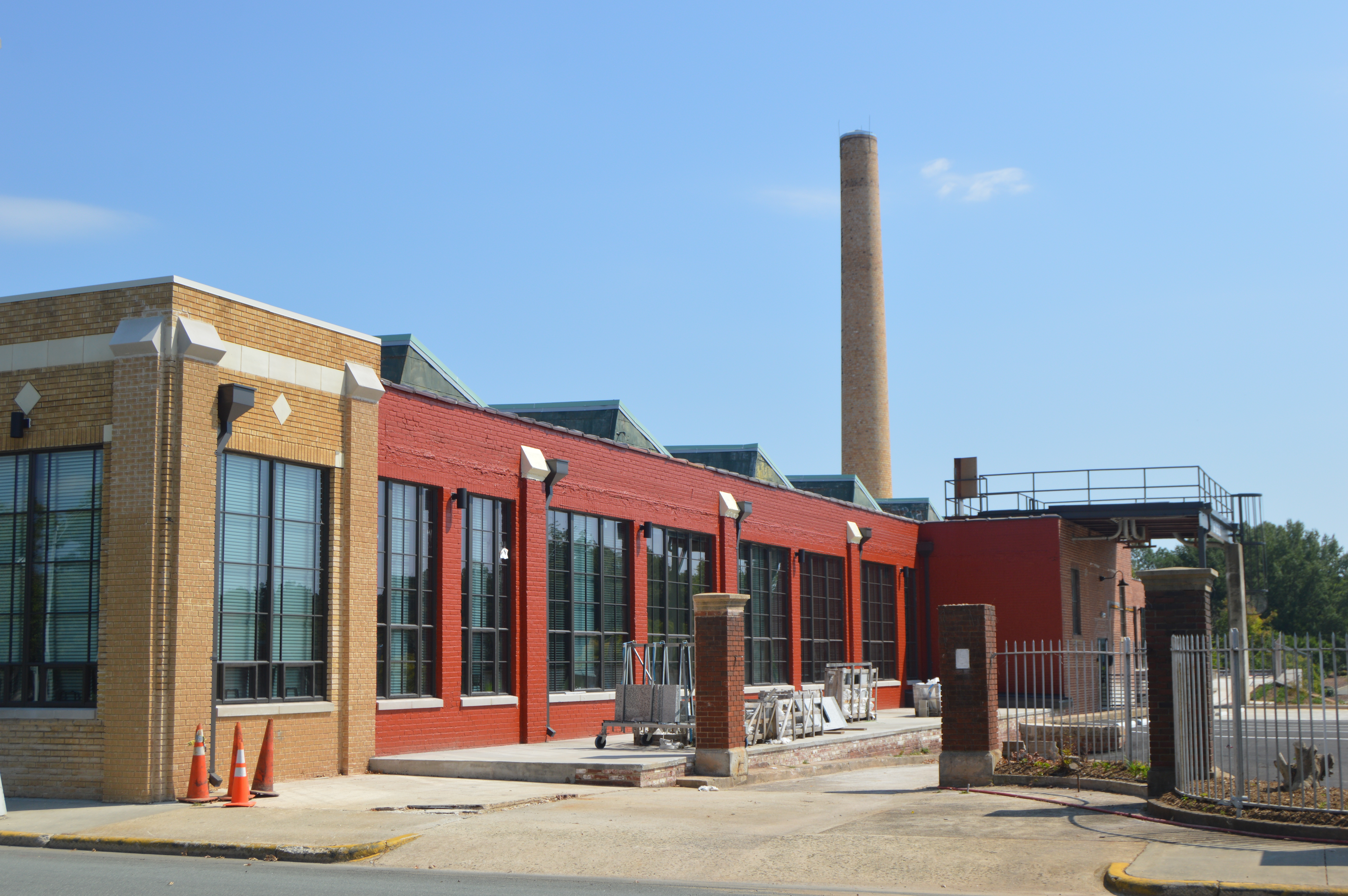
May Hosiery Mills Knitting Mill

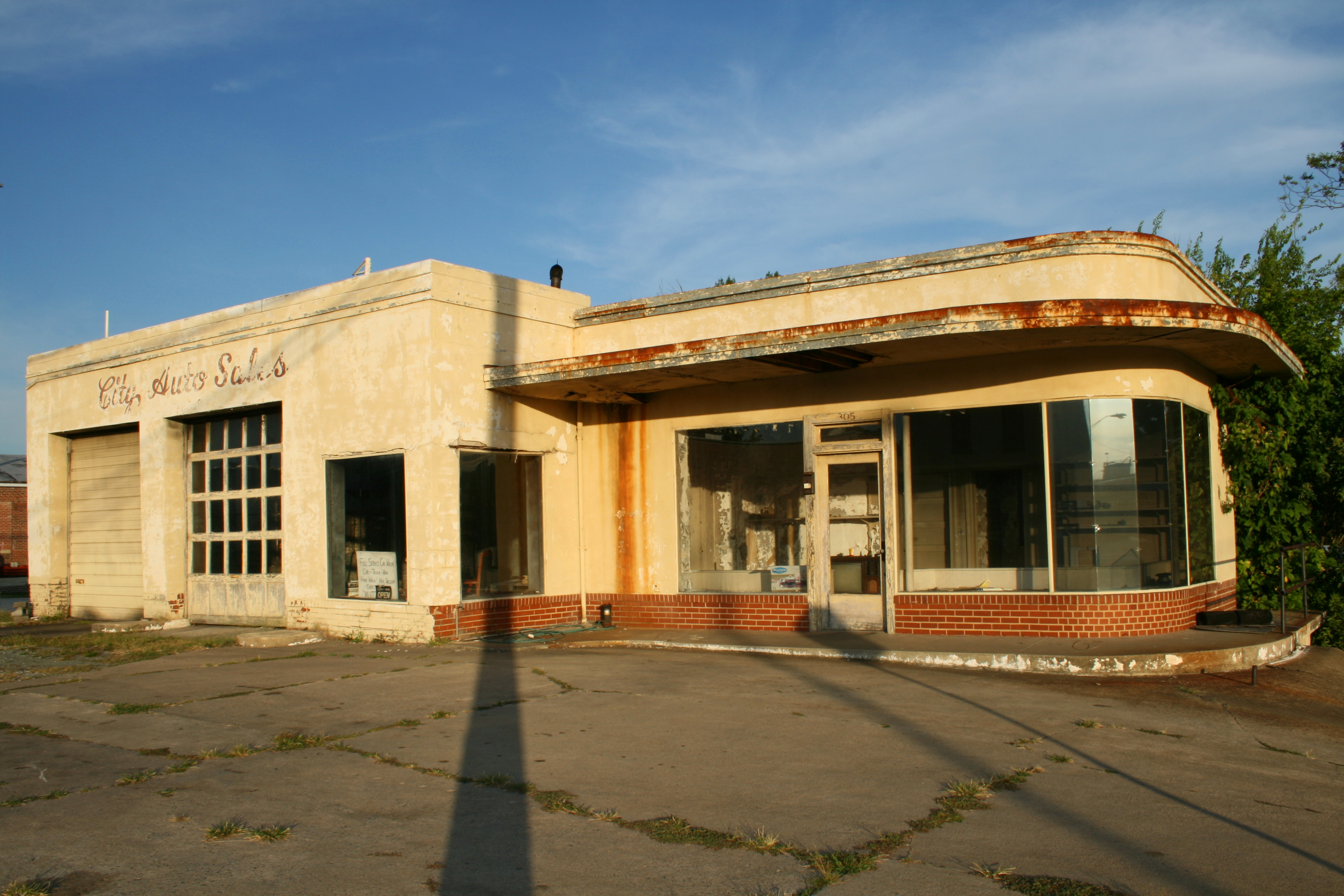
Abandoned City Auto Sales

Alamance County was created when Orange County was partitioned in 1849. Early settlers included several groups of Quakers, many of which remain active in the Snow Camp area, German farmers, and Scots-Irish immigrants.

The need of the North Carolina Railroad in the 1850s to locate land where they could build, repair and do maintenance on its track was the genesis of Burlington, North Carolina. The company selected a piece of land slightly west of present-day Graham. On January 29, 1856, the last spikes were driven into the final tie of the North Carolina Railroad project, uniting the cities of Goldsboro and Charlotte by rail. The next day, the first locomotive passed along the new route. When the iron horse arrived in Alamance County, locals referred to it as "the eighth wonder of the world".

Not long after this historic opening, the railroad realized a pressing need for repair shops. With Alamance County's position along the new line, it became the logical choice for the shops' location. After several debates concerning where the shops would be located, Gen. Benjamin Trollinger, a progressive Alamance County manufacturer, made an offer that settled the matter. Gen. Trollinger owned land just northwest of Graham, and he convinced several other prominent citizens owning adjacent lots to join him and sell their property to the railroad. 57 buildings were constructed between 1855 and 1859, including structures for engine and machine shops, carpentry, blacksmithing, houses for workers and railway officials, and company headquarters. For a brief period, railroad directors changed the name of official name of "Company Shops" to "Vance" (1863–1864), the village returned to the "Company Shops" moniker in July 1864. During the Civil War, Company Shops remained a small village without many public utilities/services like churches or schools. It was only until 1863 that company stockholders approved city street layouts and the sale of private property in the village. Though, properties used for commercial purposes still had to be leased by the company and couldn't be bought. In 1866, the village was officially incorporated as "Company Shops."

Through a series of leases and mergers, the railroad was leased to Richmond & Danville Railroad (1871), working as part of the Pennsylvania Railroad, and in 1893, the North Carolina Railroad was folded into the Southern Railway system. Following the leasing of the railroad to Richmond & Danville, many of the railroad jobs transferred to Richmond and Manchester. With the railroad shops no longer operated there, the citizens of Company Shops decided a new name was needed. In February 1887, a contest was held to decide a name, and one person submitted the name "Burlington" after seeing it on a passing train. An appointed committee for the town selected the name, and the name was officially changed through North Carolina State Legislature.

Around the turn of the century, Edwin M. Holt established small textile operations along the Haw River and Great Alamance Creek. In 1908, Edwin M. Holt built the first cotton mill in the South. From the establishment of this single factory, Alamance County grew to eventually operate 30 cotton mills and 10 to 15 yarn manufacturing plants employing 15,000 people. Eventually, the early textile venture of Edwin M. Holt became known all over the world as Burlington Industries, and is now headquartered in nearby Greensboro. Throughout this period, Burlington became a prosperous and vibrant little city filled with schools, churches, newspapers, telegraph and telephone lines, roads and a streetcar line—all in keeping with the latest "modern progress" of the times.

Though textiles continued to dominate the local economy well into the 1970s, the people of Burlington knew they could not survive with only one industry. The country's involvement in World War II brought important local economic changes. In 1942, the federal government purchased and leased a 22-acre (8.9 ha) site to Fairchild Aircraft Corporation for the construction of test aircraft. After two years of production, the site was leased to Firestone Tire Company for the Army's tank rebuilding program. At the close of the war, the federal government chose not to leave, but to utilize the property for government contract business. This decision would bring Western Electric to town along with new employees from around the country. Their contracts ensured Burlington's participation during the Cold War manufacturing and testing of emerging defense technologies. Four decades later (1991), however, Western Electric (then AT&T Federal Systems Division) permanently closed.

During this century-and-a-half of economic change, Burlington grew, adapted and prospered. Originally the center of commerce for Company Shops, the downtown area still serves as the heart of today's community with financial services, government services, an expanded library, small shops, eateries and a restored theater. Downtown has also returned to its status as a major employment center, becoming the home to Laboratory Corporation of America, one of the world's largest biomedical testing firms and Burlington/Alamance County's largest employer.

The Alamance Hotel, Allen House, Atlantic Bank and Trust Company Building, Beverly Hills Historic District, Downtown Burlington Historic District, East Davis Street Historic District, Efird Building, First Baptist Church, First Christian Church of Burlington, Polly Fogleman House, Holt-Frost House, Horner Houses, Lakeside Mills Historic District, McCray School, Menagerie Carousel, Moore-Holt-White House, South Broad-East Fifth Streets Historic District, Southern Railway Passenger Station, St. Athanasius Episcopal Church and Parish House and the Church of the Holy Comforter, Stagg House, Sunny Side, US Post Office, West Davis Street-Fountain Place Historic District, and Windsor Cotton Mills Office are listed on the National Register of Historic Places.

On November 4, 2025, Beth Kennett became the first woman to be elected mayor of Burlington.

== Geography ==
Located in the Piedmont region of North Carolina, Burlington is characterized as having mostly flat land with a few rolling hills.

According to the United States Census Bureau, the city has a total area of 31.82 square miles (82.4 km^{2}), of which 30.27 square miles (78.4 km^{2}) is land and 1.55 square miles (4.0 km^{2}) (4.87%) is water.

=== Climate ===
The climate in this area is characterized by relatively high temperatures and evenly distributed precipitation throughout the year. According to the Köppen Climate Classification system, Burlington has a Humid subtropical climate, abbreviated "Cfa" on climate maps.

Climate data for Burlington, North Carolina (1991–2020 normals, extremes 1952–present)
| Month | Jan | Feb | Mar | Apr | May | Jun | Jul | Aug | Sep | Oct | Nov | Dec | Year |
|---|---|---|---|---|---|---|---|---|---|---|---|---|---|
| Record high °F (°C) | 89 (32) | 83 (28) | 89 (32) | 95 (35) | 98 (37) | 105 (41) | 105 (41) | 104 (40) | 103 (39) | 96 (36) | 86 (30) | 79 (26) | 105 (41) |
| Mean daily maximum °F (°C) | 51.4 (10.8) | 55.1 (12.8) | 62.5 (16.9) | 72.1 (22.3) | 79.2 (26.2) | 86.4 (30.2) | 89.7 (32.1) | 88.3 (31.3) | 82.2 (27.9) | 72.9 (22.7) | 62.7 (17.1) | 54.3 (12.4) | 71.4 (21.9) |
| Daily mean °F (°C) | 41.1 (5.1) | 43.9 (6.6) | 50.9 (10.5) | 59.8 (15.4) | 68.1 (20.1) | 75.9 (24.4) | 79.6 (26.4) | 78.1 (25.6) | 71.8 (22.1) | 61.1 (16.2) | 50.9 (10.5) | 44.1 (6.7) | 60.4 (15.8) |
| Mean daily minimum °F (°C) | 30.7 (−0.7) | 32.8 (0.4) | 39.3 (4.1) | 47.4 (8.6) | 57.1 (13.9) | 65.4 (18.6) | 69.4 (20.8) | 68.0 (20.0) | 61.3 (16.3) | 49.3 (9.6) | 39.2 (4.0) | 33.8 (1.0) | 49.5 (9.7) |
| Record low °F (°C) | −6 (−21) | 4 (−16) | 8 (−13) | 21 (−6) | 23 (−5) | 43 (6) | 48 (9) | 41 (5) | 29 (−2) | 24 (−4) | 15 (−9) | 3 (−16) | −6 (−21) |
| Average precipitation inches (mm) | 3.96 (101) | 3.24 (82) | 4.44 (113) | 3.83 (97) | 3.63 (92) | 4.63 (118) | 4.39 (112) | 4.12 (105) | 4.91 (125) | 3.35 (85) | 3.21 (82) | 3.35 (85) | 47.06 (1,195) |
Source: NOAA

== Parks, sports, and recreation ==
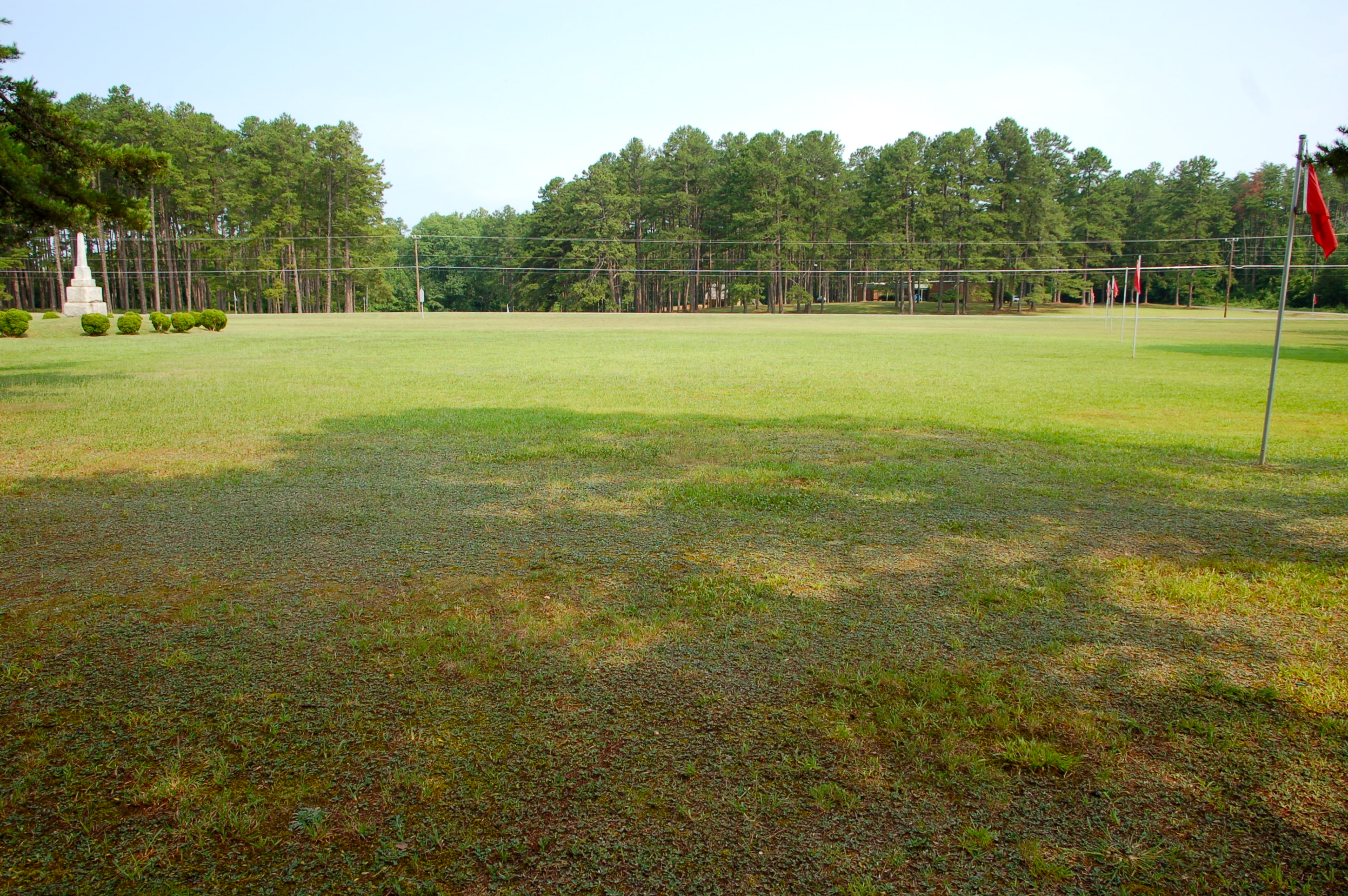
Alamance Battleground State Historic Site, southwest of Burlington

There are a variety of parks that can be found in Burlington, including Joe Davidson Park and the Burlington City Park. Upon visiting these parks one can find a variety of things for various activities, such as baseball fields, basketball courts, soccer fields, playgrounds, disc golf and tennis courts.

The Alamance County Recreation and Parks Commission is made up of nine citizen volunteers and one representative from the Alamance-Burlington Board of Education and the Alamance County Board of Commissioners.

The Alamance County Recreation and Parks Department manages parks and community centers at the following locations:

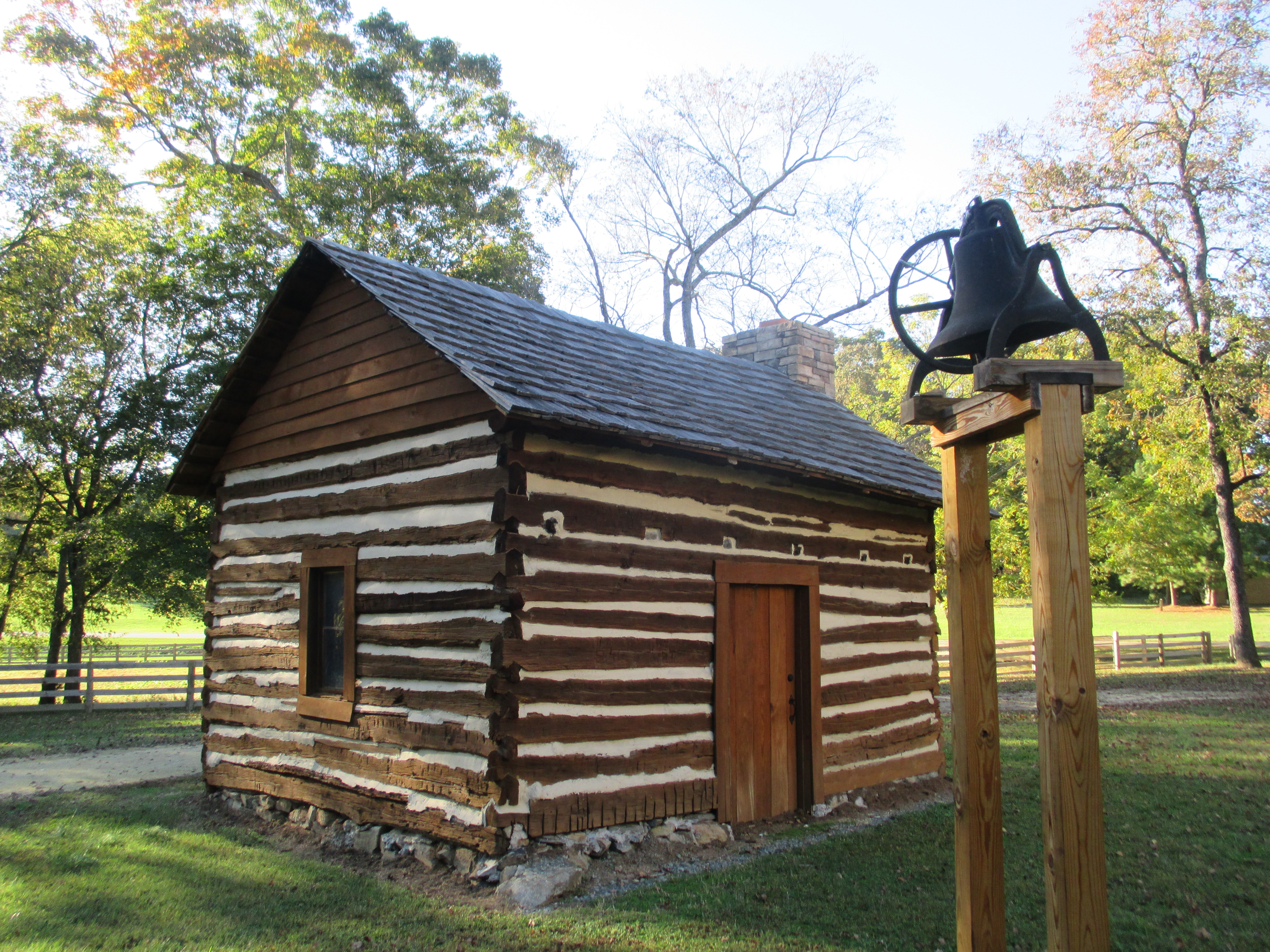
Cedarock Park, south of Burlington

- Cedarock Park
- Shallow Ford Natural Area
- Great Bend Park at Glencoe
- Pleasant Grove Recreation Center
- Eli Whitney Recreation Center

Alamance County offers many hiking and paddle opportunities including the Haw River Trail and the Mountains-to-Sea Trail. The Alamance County Recreation and Parks Department manages accesses to the Haw River Paddle and Hiking Trail at the following locations:

- Altamahaw Paddle Access
- Shallow Ford Natural Area
- Great Bend Park at Glencoe
- Glencoe Paddle Access
- Saxapahaw Lake Paddle Access
- Saxapahaw Mill Race Paddle Access

The Burlington Sock Puppets, members of the Appalachian League, a wood-bat collegiate summer league, play their home games at Burlington Athletic Stadium in Fairchild Park. They were previously known as the Burlington Royals from 2007 to 2020. The Royals were rebranded as the Sock Puppets following the contraction and reorganization of minor league baseball prior to the 2021 season. 2021 was the inaugural season for the revamped Appalachian League and the Sock Puppets. Prior to being known as the Burlington Royals, the team was also known as the Burlington Indians from 1986 to 2006. Several current and former MLB players began their careers in Burlington, including Jim Thome, CC Sabathia, Manny Ramirez, and Bartolo Colón.

The city of Burlington also operates the nearby The Valley Golf Course.

The flagship of the Burlington Parks System, Burlington City Park offers more than 75 acres of activities for the entire family. It serves as the home of an amusement area consisting of a carousel, miniature train, boat and car ride, playground, amphitheater, baseball field, picnic shelters, and walking trails. A fully restored Dentzel Carousel is the highlight of the amusement area. As part of the National Historical Register, the carousel attracts thousands of visitors yearly. The Burlington Carousel Festival, is held annually in the park.

Burlington is home to the Burlington Boys' Choir, the oldest organization of its kind in the state. It was founded in 1959 and has toured widely around and outside the United States. Its founder, Eva Wiseman, was inspired by the Vienna Boys' Choir.

== Demographics ==
Historical population
| Census | Pop. | Note | %± |
|---|---|---|---|
| 1880 | 817 | | — |
| 1890 | 1,716 | | 110.0% |
| 1900 | 3,692 | | 115.2% |
| 1910 | 4,808 | | 30.2% |
| 1920 | 5,952 | | 23.8% |
| 1930 | 9,737 | | 63.6% |
| 1940 | 12,198 | | 25.3% |
| 1950 | 24,560 | | 101.3% |
| 1960 | 33,199 | | 35.2% |
| 1970 | 35,930 | | 8.2% |
| 1980 | 37,266 | | 3.7% |
| 1990 | 39,498 | | 6.0% |
| 2000 | 44,917 | | 13.7% |
| 2010 | 50,042 | | 11.4% |
| 2020 | 57,303 | | 14.5% |
| 2025 (est.) | 61,496 | | 7.3% |
U.S. Decennial Census

=== 2020 census ===
As of the 2020 census, there were 57,303 people, 23,873 households, and 12,978 families residing in the city.

The median age was 38.9 years. 23.2% of residents were under the age of 18 and 17.8% were 65 years of age or older. For every 100 females there were 89.0 males, and for every 100 females age 18 and over there were 84.1 males age 18 and over.

99.9% of residents lived in urban areas, while 0.1% lived in rural areas.

Of the 23,873 households, 30.0% had children under the age of 18 living with them. 36.0% were married-couple households, 19.7% were households with a male householder and no spouse or partner present, and 37.4% were households with a female householder and no spouse or partner present. About 34.1% of all households were made up of individuals, and 14.7% had someone living alone who was 65 years of age or older.

There were 25,771 housing units, of which 7.4% were vacant. The homeowner vacancy rate was 2.0% and the rental vacancy rate was 6.4%.

Burlington racial composition
| Race | Number | Percentage |
|---|---|---|
| White (non-Hispanic) | 25,810 | 45.04% |
| Black or African American (non-Hispanic) | 16,118 | 28.13% |
| Native American | 193 | 0.34% |
| Asian | 1,353 | 2.36% |
| Pacific Islander | 42 | 0.07% |
| Other/Mixed | 2,296 | 4.01% |
| Hispanic or Latino | 11,491 | 20.05% |

Racial composition as of the 2020 census
| Race | Number | Percent |
|---|---|---|
| White | 27,185 | 47.4% |
| Black or African American | 16,338 | 28.5% |
| American Indian and Alaska Native | 564 | 1.0% |
| Asian | 1,374 | 2.4% |
| Native Hawaiian and Other Pacific Islander | 48 | 0.1% |
| Some other race | 7,715 | 13.5% |
| Two or more races | 4,079 | 7.1% |
| Hispanic or Latino (of any race) | 11,491 | 20.1% |

=== 2010 census ===
At the 2010 census, there were 49,963 people, 20,632 households, and 12,679 families residing in the city. The population density was 1,967.0 inhabitants per square mile (759.5/km^{2}). There were 23,414 housing units at an average density of 921.8 per square mile (355.9/km^{2}). The racial makeup of the city was 57.6% White, 28% African American, 0.7% Native American, 2.1% Asian, 0.1% Pacific Islander, 9.2% from other races, and 2.4% from two or more races. Hispanic or Latino of any race were 16% of the population.

There were 20,632 households, out of which 28.1% had children under the age of 18 living with them, 38.9% were married couples living together, 17.5% had a female householder with no husband present, and 38.5% were non-families. 33% of all households were made up of individuals, and 13.1% had someone living alone who was 65 years of age or older. The average household size was 2.38 and the average family size was 3.01.

In the city, the population was spread out, with 26.6% under the age of 20, 6.5% from 20 to 24, 26.1% from 25 to 44, 25.2% from 45 to 64, and 15.7% who were 65 years of age or older. The average age was 38.3 years.

The median income for a household in the city was $42,097, and the median income for a family was $49,797. The per capita income for the city was $23,465. About 15.9% of families and 19.6% of the population were below the poverty line, including 34.9% of those under age 18 and 10.2% of those age 65 or over.

=== 2023 ACS 5-year estimates ===
As of 2023, there were 24,713 households in Burlington with 14,594 families. The average number of people per household was 2.34, and the average number of people per family was 3.09. The average annual income in 2023 in Burlington was $73,496 per household.

== Education ==
=== K–12 education ===
==== Public schools ====
The Alamance-Burlington School System is the school district for the portion in Alamance County (that is, for the majority of the city limits). The Alamance-Burlington district was created by a merger between the Alamance County School System and the Burlington City School System in 1996.

Elementary schools

- Alexander Wilson Elementary School
- Altamahaw-Ossipee Elementary School
- Audrey W. Garrett Elementary School
- B. Everett Jordan Elementary School
- Eastlawn Elementary School
- Elon Elementary School
- E. M. Holt Elementary School
- E. M. Yoder Elementary School
- Grove Park Elementary School
- Harvey R. Newlin Elementary School
- Haw River Elementary School
- Highland Elementary School
- Hillcrest Elementary School
- Marvin B. Smith Elementary School
- North Graham Elementary School
- Pleasant Grove Elementary School
- R. Homer Andrews Elementary School
- South Graham Elementary School
- South Mebane Elementary School
- Sylvan Elementary School

Middle schools

- Broadview Middle School
- Graham Middle School
- Hawfields Middle School
- Southern Middle School
- Turrentine Middle School
- Western Alamance Middle School
- Woodlawn Middle School

High schools:

- Eastern Alamance High School
- Graham High School
- Hugh M. Cummings High School
- Southern Alamance High School
- Southeast Alamance High School
- Walter M. Williams High School
- Western Alamance High School

The portion in Guilford County is within the Guilford County Schools school district.

==== Private schools ====
- Alamance Christian School
- Blessed Sacrament School
- Burlington Christian Academy
- The Burlington School

==== Charter ====
- Clover Garden School
- River Mill Academy

==== Other ====
- Alamance-Burlington Early College at ACC
- Alamance Virtual School
- Career and Technical Education Center
- Ray Street Academy
- Sellars-Gunn Education Center

=== Higher education ===
Alamance Community College (part of the public North Carolina Community College System) has campuses in Burlington and nearby Graham, offering multiple academic programs and specialized career training. Elon University (a private 4-year university) is in nearby Elon.

== Transportation ==
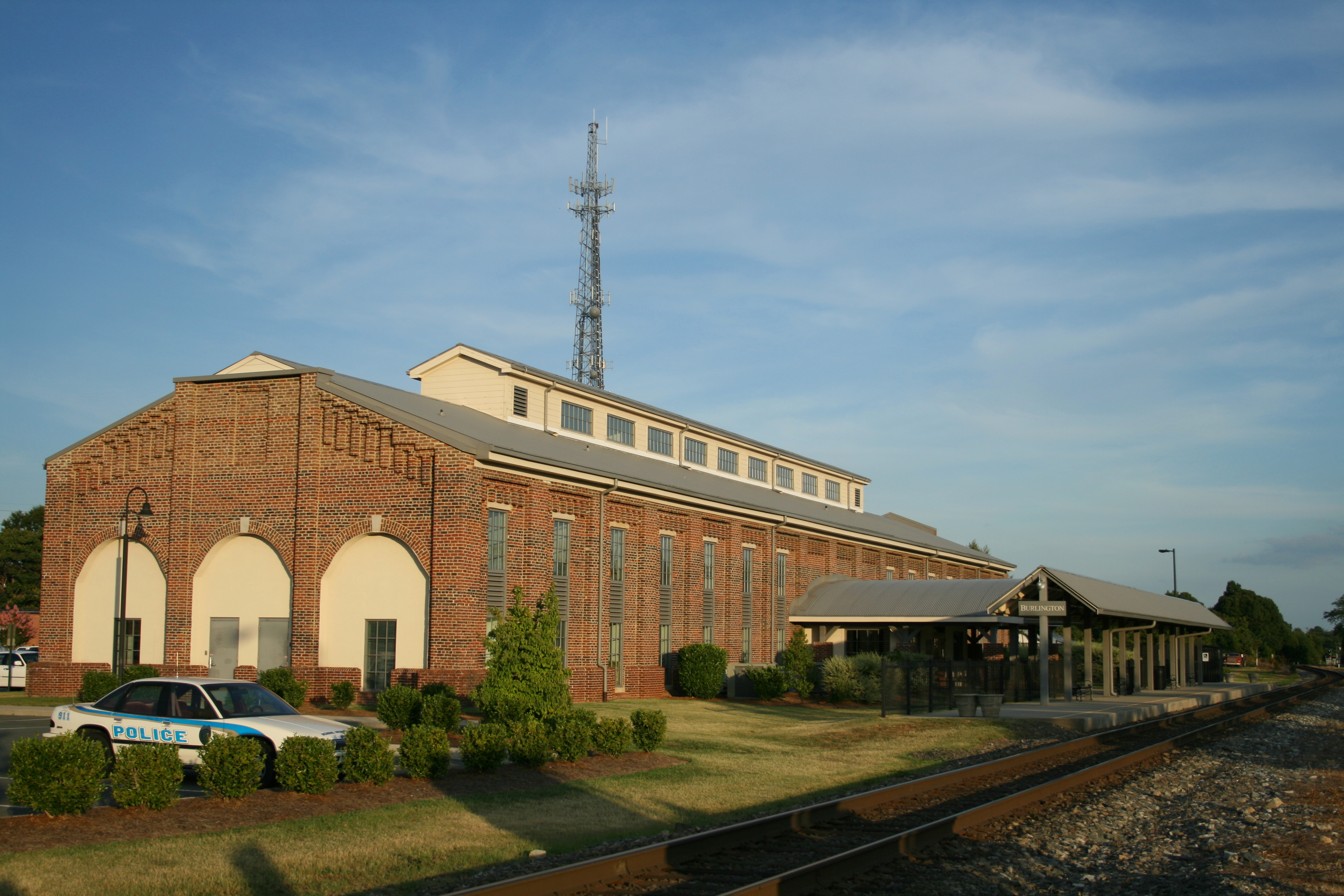
Burlington Station

Amtrak's Piedmont train connects Burlington to Raleigh, Durham, Charlotte, Greensboro, and other points in central North Carolina. The Carolinian train continues to New York with intermediate stops including Richmond, Washington, Baltimore, and Philadelphia. Burlington Station is situated at 101 North Main Street.

Burlington opened its first public transit service, Link Transit, on June 6, 2016. As of September 21, 2017, more than 100,000 people have used the service. In addition, transportation services are available to its residents through the Alamance County Transportation Authority. Locals can also ride the BioBus from nearby Elon University.

Burlington is about 35 miles from the Piedmont Triad International Airport in Greensboro and about 48 miles from Raleigh-Durham International Airport near Cary. In addition Burlington is served by three major road corridors including Interstate 40, Interstate 85, and U.S. Route 70.

== Business ==
- Labcorp has its headquarters and several testing facilities in Burlington. Labcorp is Alamance County's largest employer, employing over 5,000 people in the county.
- Honda Aero, a subsidiary of Honda, recently announced that it will move its corporate headquarters to Burlington and build a $21 million plant at the Burlington-Alamance Regional Airport where it will build its HF120 jet engines for use in very light jets.
- Glen Raven Inc., a fabric manufacturing and marketing company. Sunbrella is Glen Raven, Inc.'s flagship brand.
- Biscuitville, a regional fast food chain, founded in Burlington.
- Gold Toe Brands, a manufacturer of socks.
- The Times-News is Burlington's only daily newspaper, and the area's dominant media outlet.
- The Alamance News is a weekly alternative newspaper covering local, sports news in Alamance County.
- Burlington Latino is a Spanish-language alternative newspaper covering local news in Burlington.
- Zack's Hotdogs, a local restaurant opened by Zack Touloupas in 1928 is located in the revitalized downtown area.

== Shopping ==
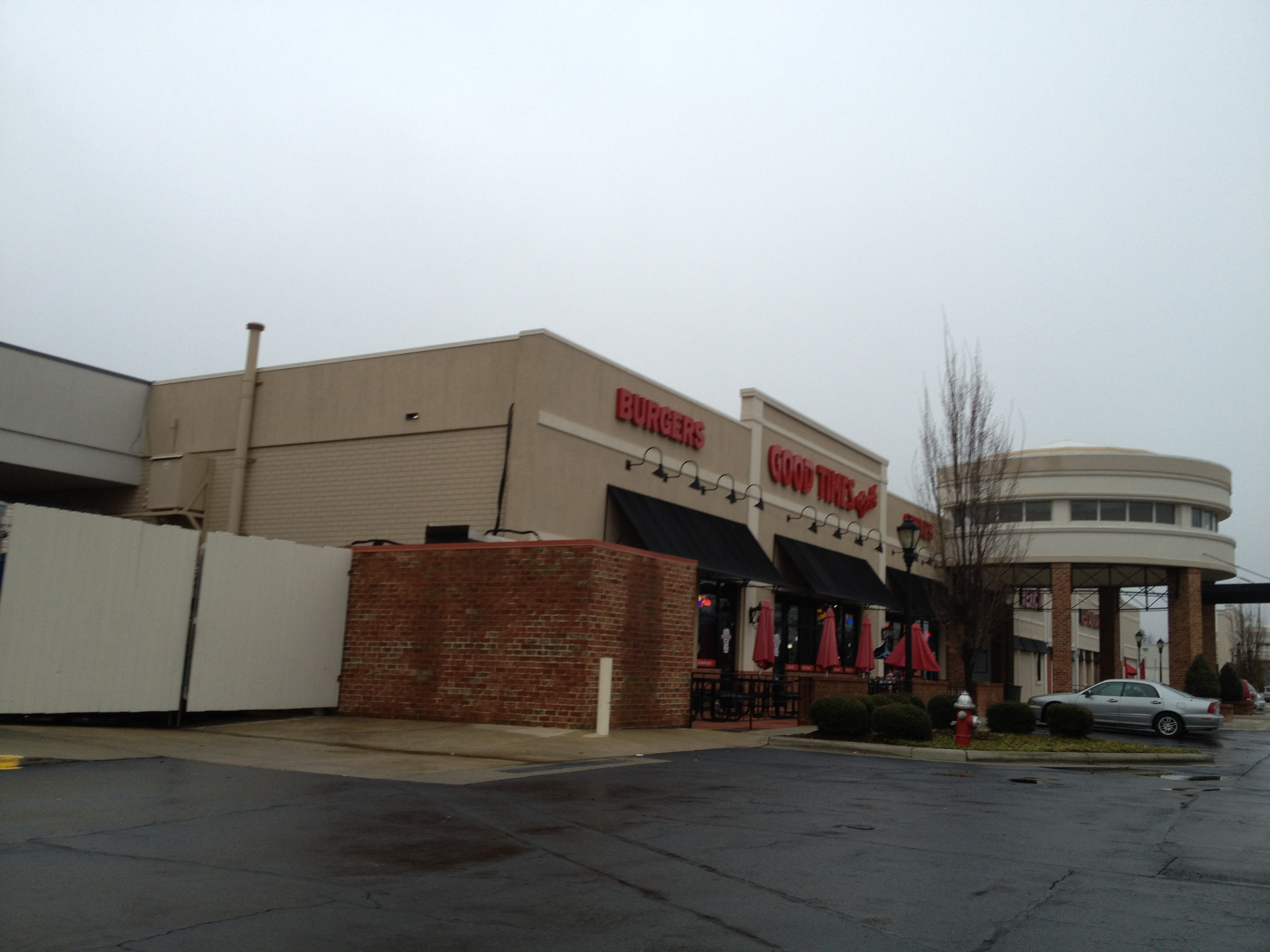
Holly Hill Mall

The city's only indoor mall, Holly Hill Mall, is located at the intersection of Huffman Mill Road and Church Street (US 70). An outdoor mall, Alamance Crossing, opened in 2007 at Interstate 40/85 and University Drive. Just off I-40/85 is the Burlington Outlet Village (formerly known as the BMOC). At the time of opening in 1981, it was North Carolina's first outlet mall.

== Notable residents ==
- Adam Armour, soccer player
- G. Robert Blakey, attorney and law professor.
- Jesse Branson former NBA player
- Billy Bryan, former NFL center
- Josh Bush, former NFL free safety
- Chris Castor, former NFL wide receiver
- Drew Coble, former American League umpire
- Geoff Crompton, former NBA player
- Max Drake (born 1952), musician; born in Burlington
- William Edward Ellis, Vice admiral in the United States Navy
- Andrew Everett, professional wrestler
- Frank Haith, college basketball head coach, Missouri, Miami, Tulsa; grew up in Burlington
- Sammy Johnson, former NFL running back
- Charley Jones, former MLB player
- Dwight Jones, former University of North Carolina and NFL wide receiver
- Don Kernodle, born in Burlington, five-time NWA champion and tag team partner of Sgt. Slaughter; appeared in Paradise Alley with Sylvester Stallone
- John Meeks (born 1999), basketball player in the Israeli Basketball Premier League
- Blanche Taylor Moore, convicted murderer, whose life story was portrayed in the television movie Black Widow Murders: The Blanche Taylor Moore Story, starring Elizabeth Montgomery
- Danny Morrison, former president of the Carolina Panthers
- Doug Nikhazy, MLB pitcher
- Will Richardson, NFL offensive lineman
- Tequan Richmond, born in Burlington, stars as Drew Rock in Everybody Hates Chris, and played a young Ray Charles in the movie Ray
- W. Kerr Scott, Governor of North Carolina from 1949 to 1953, US senator (Class 2) from 1954 to 1958
- Brandon Spoon, former NFL middle linebacker for the Buffalo Bills
- Brandon Tate, former NFL wide receiver, holds NCAA career record for most combined return yards (3,523)
- Floyd Wicker, former MLB player

== Sister cities ==
Burlington has two sister cities, as designated by Sister Cities International:

- Gwacheon, Gyeonggi-do, South Korea
- Soledad de Graciano Sánchez, San Luis Potosí, Mexico

== See also ==
- List of municipalities in North Carolina
