= Cedarock Park =

Historic farm in North Carolina, United States

- IUCN category II (national park)
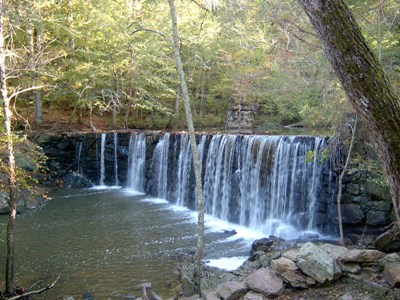
- Old Mill Dam on Rock Creek

- Location within North Carolina
- Location: Alamance County, North Carolina, United States
- Coordinates: 35°59′41.36″N 79°26′24.15″W
- Area: 0.65 sq mi (1.7 km^{2})
- Elevation: 539 ft (164 m)
- Established: 1973
- Named for: Large number of rocks and cedar trees in park
- Visitors: 140000
- Governing body: Alamance County Recreation and Parks
- Cedarock Park Historic District
- U.S. National Register of Historic Places
- U.S. Historic district
- Location: SR 2409, near Graham, North Carolina
- Area: 414 acres (168 ha)
- Built: 1820
- Built by: John F. Garrett, et al.
- Architectural style: Greek Revival
- NRHP reference No.: 86003455
- Added to NRHP: December 4, 1986

Cedarock Park is a 500-acre (2.0 km^{2}) nature preserve, historic farm, and passive-use park located near Bellemont in Alamance County, North Carolina. The park opened in 1975 with Ronald Dean Coleman serving as the Parks Director for the county at the time. He envisioned a natural area just a few miles from town where anyone could come and explore some of the most beautiful property Alamance County has to offer.

== Geographic setting ==
Cedarock Park sits on the banks of Rock Creek, a tributary of Great Alamance Creek on the northwestern side of the Cane Creek Mountains. Located in the Piedmont region of North Carolina, the land is hilly and at times steep.

== Human history ==
Prior to its use as a park, the land was used as a farm by the Garrett family beginning in 1830.

The site of the Garrett farm is part of the Cedarock Park Historic District and is known as Cedarock Historic Farm, an educational site where visitors can learn about farm life in 19th-century North Carolina and interact with goats and donkeys. The historic district encompasses nine contributing buildings, one contributing site, and one contributing structure. They include the Greek Revival style G. W. Garrett House (c. 1835) with its full complement of farm outbuildings including a log kitchen; the Greek Revival style Curtis House (c. 1820); a 12-foot-high rock dam which may date to the early 19th century; the ruins of the rock foundation of the Huffman Mill, a water-powered grist mill (c. 1880) constructed on the site of a brick antebellum cotton mill; and the Carney Post Office (c. 1893), a small one-story frame building. The historic district was added to the National Register of Historic Places in 1986.

== Activities ==
The park has 6 miles (9.7 km) of trails for hiking, mountain biking, and horse riding, including some trails that are handicapped accessible. It has numerous picnic shelters, campsites, a fishing pond, playgrounds, three gazebos, and two disc golf courses.

The most popular trail at the park is the handicapped-accessible trail that leads to an old rock dam used for water diversion for a now-demolished gristmill. The dam site is erroneously called a waterfall in several places in park literature.
