= Glencoe School =

Historic school building in North Carolina, United States

- U.S. National Register of Historic Places
- Location within North Carolina Location within the United States
- Location: 2649 Union Ridge Rd., Glencoe, North Carolina
- Coordinates: 36°08′48″N 79°25′25″W
- Area: 6 acres (2.4 ha)
- Built: 1936
- Built by: C. H. Bright
- Architect: R.R. Markley
- Architectural style: Colonial Revival, Craftsman
- NRHP reference No.: 10001055
- Added to NRHP: December 27, 2010

Glencoe School is a historic school building located near Glencoe, Alamance County, North Carolina. It was built in 1936 with Public Works Administration to serve the Glencoe Mill community and nearby families. It is a one-story, frame school with brick veneer influenced by the Colonial Revival and American Craftsman styles. A cafeteria addition was built in 1951. The school remained in use until 1963, then served as administrative offices for the County Board of Education.

It was added to the National Register of Historic Places in 2010.
