= Glencoe Mill Village Historic District =

Historic district in North Carolina, United States

- U.S. National Register of Historic Places
- U.S. Historic district
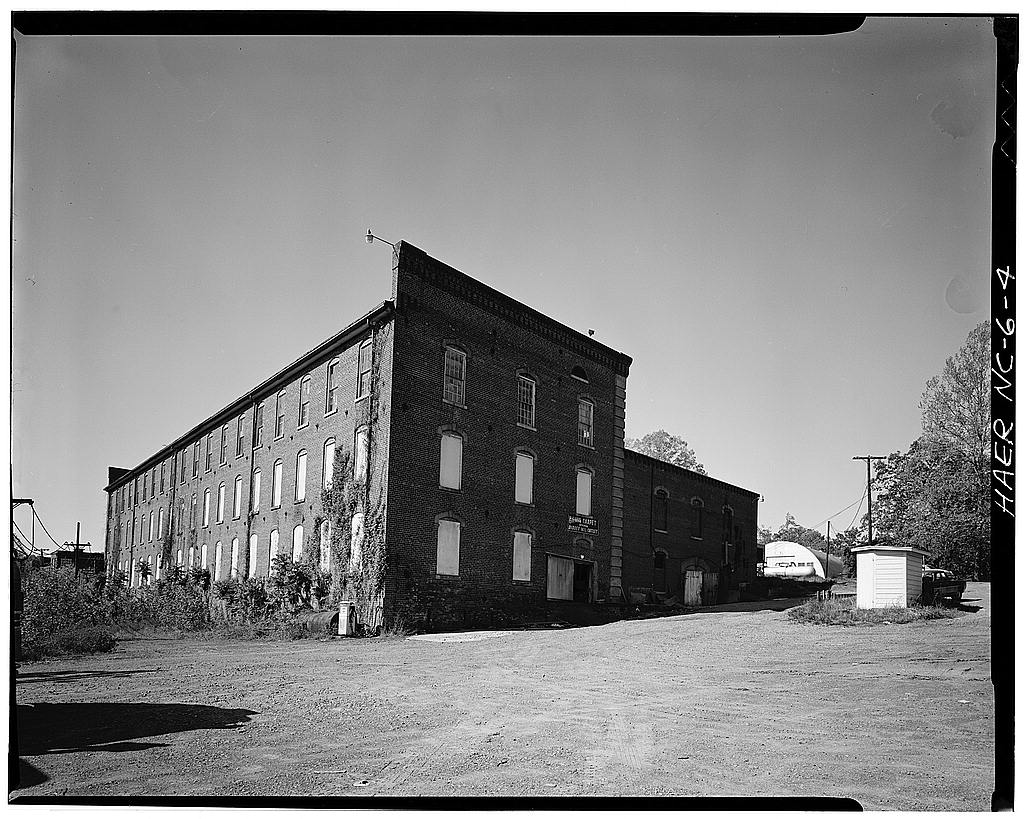
- Glencoe Mill, HAER Photo, April 1978

- Location within North Carolina Location within the United States
- Location: Off NC 62 at Haw River, Glencoe, North Carolina
- Coordinates: 36°08′27″N 79°25′44″W
- Area: 105 acres (42 ha)
- Built: 1880-1882
- Architect: Multiple
- Architectural style: Italianate
- NRHP reference No.: 79001654
- Added to NRHP: February 16, 1979

Glencoe Mill Village Historic District is a national historic district located at Glencoe, Alamance County, North Carolina. It encompasses 48 contributing buildings and 6 contributing structures built between 1880 and 1882 in Glencoe.

The district consists of three parts: 1) a manufacturing and commercial complex; 2) a power and water system; and 3) a residential and social unit. The complex includes a three-story, Italianate style main mill building, a wheel house, a one-story picker house, a dye-house, finishing room and napper house, cotton warehouses and other storage buildings, and an office and company store complex.

The original 250 by 8 foot (76.2 m × 2.4 m) log and stone dam from the grist and saw mill which occupied the site from the early 1860s provided 130 horsepower via a double turbine Poole & Hunt Company water wheel measuring 66 inches (1.7 m). Steam engines were added to the Dye House, Finishing and Napper rooms by 1905.

The power and water system includes a concrete dam across the Haw River, tail race, and a generating plant. The residential and social unit includes 41 frame dwellings, some with detached kitchens and outbuildings, a lodge, and the ruins of the village church.

The 38.9 acres (15.7 ha) property was purchased on January 26, 1878 for $8000 by E. M. Holt & Sons. An additional 148.2 acres (60.0 ha) was purchased the following year. The Holts established other cotton mills throughout Alamance County because of the "abundant water power drew workers from and supplemented local agriculture" according to a Historic American Engineering Record prepared in 1977.

It was added to the National Register of Historic Places in 1979. The building which once housed management offices and the company store was established as a museum in 2002.

== See also ==
- Textile Heritage Museum
- Bellemont Mill Village Historic District
- Alamance Mill Village Historic District
