= Pickett House =

Pickett House may refer to:

- James A. Pickett House, Finchville, Kentucky, listed on the National Register of Historic Places in Shelby County, Kentucky
- Kernodle-Pickett House, Bellemont, North Carolina, National Register of Historic Places listings in Alamance County, North Carolina
- Pickett House (Bellingham, Washington), listed on the NRHP in Washington
