= Marc Ange =

Franco-Italian artist and designer

Marc Ange is a French-Italian artist and designer, based between Paris and Los Angeles. He is the founder and artistic director of Bloom Room, an agency specialized in "creating the extraordinary": interior design, art direction, furniture and object design, branding, and graphic design. He is known for the creation of extraordinary furniture pieces like 'Le Refuge' for LJ Edition.

== Early life and family ==
Ange was born on April 11, 1978, in Rome. His official biography begins with "Marc Ange was born in the Holy City of Rome, under the terror of the Red Brigades, in a rootless family with a surreal story, torn between art, religion and madness". His mother, a painter, comes from a wealthy Roman family whose members have dedicated their life to art. His father, a businessman and adventurous entrepreneur, comes from a very poor family of Sicilian, French and Spanish descent. At age 5, Ange immigrated to France with his parents. He currently lives between Paris & Los Angeles with his partner Hanane El Moutii.

== Career ==
Ange graduated from the Parisian ESDI design school in 2002. He then left France to regain his native Italy and started a car designer career with major companies in Turin. After a few years in the automotive field, and tired of the monotony associated with creative specialization, Ange decided to return to France in order to create his own studio. In 2008, he founded Bloom Room, an agency dedicated to "the creation of extraordinary".

His detachment from any specialty allows Ange to freely explore the grey area between creative art and design, and therefore develop projects by intertwining conceptual and stylistic values from other artistic universes.

Ange's agency Bloom Room was quickly recognized for its ultra-creative nature: he was thus entrusted with the design of objects, spaces or vehicles for brands such as: Louis Vuitton, Moët & Chandon, Jean-Paul Gaultier, Paco Rabanne, Penhaligon's, Peugeot, Citroen, Ferrari, Cassina...

In 2011, he created Chimère Edition with Frédéric Stouls. Chimère Edition is "the first contemporary furniture company dedicated to pets" according to Le Monde.

In 2012, Ange co-founded with Julien Bologna the high-end Champagne brand Le Bal du Hibou.

In 2015, Ange partnered with Raphael Lancrey-Javal to develop his creative agency internationally: the year after, Bloom Room opened a second design office in Downtown Los Angeles. Flaunt Magazine welcomed him with a spread in their "Ohlalaland" issue, where Marc Ange designed the epitome of a Franco-Angeleno house.

In 2017 Ange opened the doors of Bloom Room Los Angeles.

In 2017 Ange unveiled his first furniture collection for LJ Edition featuring 'Le Refuge', a daybed with giant palm leaves inspired by the Designer's newfound home in California. The piece is exhibited during Milan Design Week in April 2017 at the Mediateca di Brera with Wallpaper* magazine and quickly becomes the most visited exhibit of the fair.

In 2017, Ange created an art installation for Art Basel at Miami Beach using his ‘Le Refuge’ piece, debuted at the Milan Design Week, in collaboration with Sunbrella's Les Araigneés upholstered armchairs. The art installation was called Les Araigneés et Le Refuge.

In 2018 Ange won the Wallpaper* award for 'Le Refuge'.

In 2019 Ange unveiled additional pieces from his furniture collection during Milan Design Week at Palazzo Cusani.

His work currently includes the design of Objects, Furniture Pieces and Spaces. He is designing private residences around the world and a new restaurant in the heart of the Medina in Marrakech.

== Creative universe ==
His tumultuous childhood as well his relationship with his speechless brother are the foundation of Ange's artistic universe: both ambivalent and contrasting, where beauty is enhanced by horror, where perfection exists through error, where harmony needs its hazards. Childhood is also very present in Ange's creations, including some deliberate confusion of the real and the unreal, and a sense of naive and nostalgic hope. Cinema is also a great source of inspiration for Ange, because of its ability to unleash all possibilities. The artist and designer is fascinated by the poetry and aesthetics of filmmakers such as Luchino Visconti, Michelangelo Antonioni, Federico Fellini, Alejandro Jodorowsky, Stanley Kubrick and David Lynch.
