= L. Banks Holt House =

Historic house in North Carolina, United States

- U.S. National Register of Historic Places
- Location within North Carolina Location within the United States
- Location: S of Alamance on NC 62, near Alamance, North Carolina
- Coordinates: 36°1′8″N 79°29′30″W
- Area: 1.5 acres (0.61 ha)
- Built: 1870s
- Architectural style: Italianate, Vernacular Italianate
- NRHP reference No.: 77000988
- Added to NRHP: April 18, 1977

L. Banks Holt House is a historic home located near Alamance, Alamance County, North Carolina. It was built in the 1870s, and consists of a two-story main block, two-story ell, and one-story hip-roofed wing in a vernacular Italianate style. Parts of the house may date to the late 18th or early 19th century. Also on the property is the Holt family cemetery.

The house now serves as the Alamance County Historical Museum.

It was added to the National Register of Historic Places in 1977.
