= Altamahaw Mill Office =

Historic building in North Carolina, US

- U.S. National Register of Historic Places
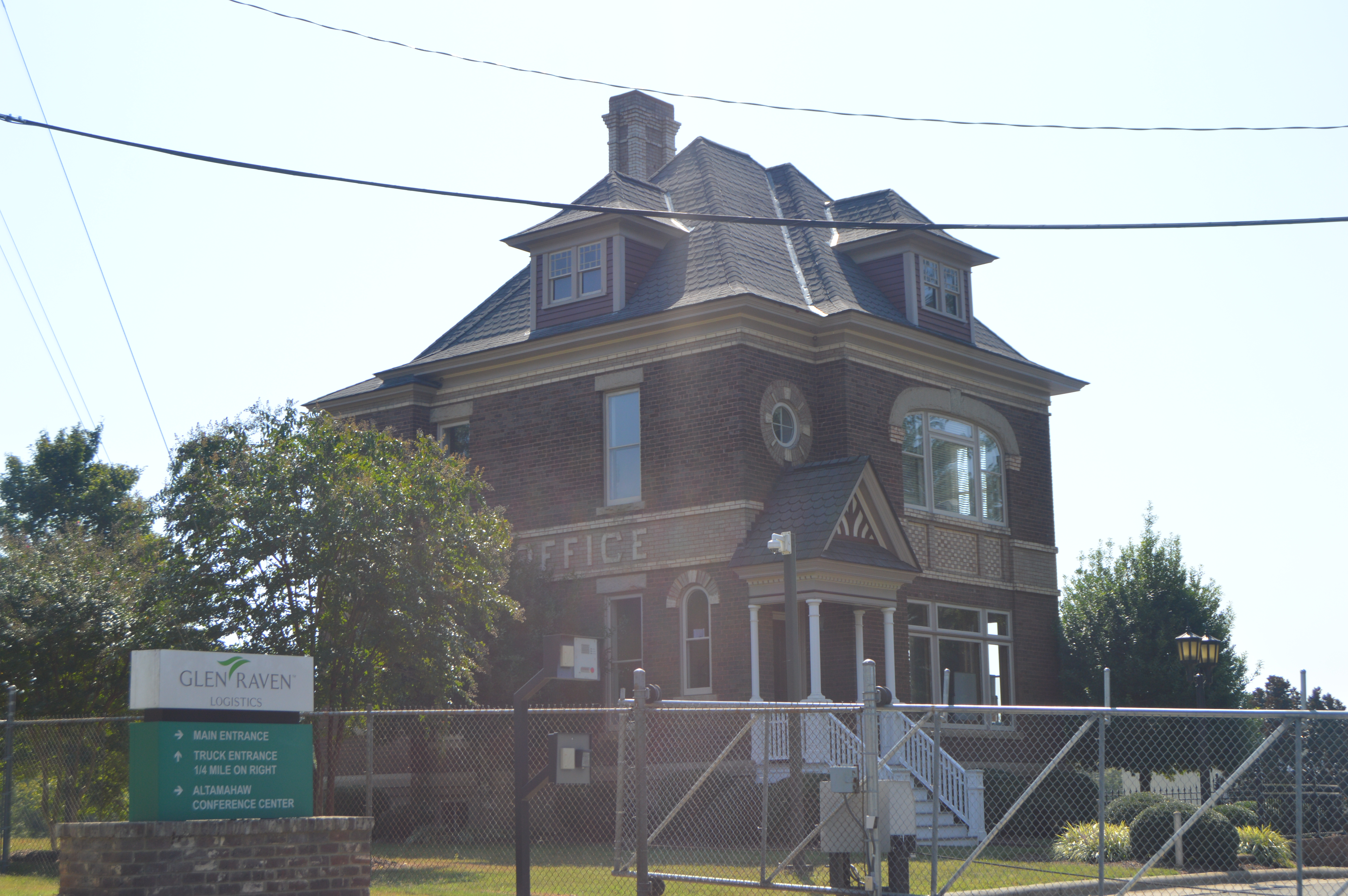
- Facade

- Location within North Carolina Location within the United States
- Location: SR 1002 and SR 1567, Altamahaw, North Carolina
- Coordinates: 36°11′2″N 79°30′27″W
- Area: 3 acres (1.2 ha)
- Built: 1890
- Architectural style: Queen Anne
- NRHP reference No.: 84000301
- Added to NRHP: November 20, 1984

Altamahaw Mill Office is a historic office building located at Altamahaw, Alamance County, North Carolina. It was built in 1890, and is an irregular shaped, 2 1/2-story, Queen Anne style brick office building. It features an intersecting bell-cast roof, a decorative chimney, and a wide band of brown and cream-colored bricks.

It was added to the National Register of Historic Places in 1984.
