= Morgantown, Burlington, North Carolina =

Morgantown, North Carolina
- Unincorporated community
- Location of Morgantown in North Carolina
- Coordinates: 36°07′19″N 79°25′44″W
- Country: United States
- State: North Carolina
- County: Alamance
- Elevation: 640 ft (200 m)
- Time zone: UTC-5 (Eastern (EST))
  - Summer (DST): UTC-4 (EDT)
- Area code: 336
- GNIS feature ID: 1021534

Morgantown is a neighborhood of Burlington in central Alamance County, North Carolina, United States. It is located on North Carolina Highway 62, south of Glencoe.

== Notable people ==
- Alex Gibbs, American football coach.
