= Richard Frinier =

Richard Frinier (born 1946 in Los Angeles, California) is an American furniture, textile and industrial designer who lives and works in California.

A graduate of California State University Long Beach holding a master of arts degree, Frinier has been a product designer in the home industries since 1977, with emphasis on indoor/outdoor furniture, textiles and accessories. He has worked for and collaborated with manufacturers domestically and abroad, including Glen Raven/Sunbrella® textiles, Dedon, Brown Jordan, Century Furniture and others. His range of work encompasses hundreds of collections and thousands of individual product designs. In 2002, he co-founded the Richard Frinier Design Studio with his wife and creative partner, Catherine Frinier, to further expand their work in the furniture and textile design industries.

== Career and design ==
Former Chief Creative Officer of the Brown Jordan Company for over 20 years, Frinier >, Frinier formed a design consultancy in California along with his wife and creative partner, Catherine Frinier, where they have continued to serve and collaborate with an international clientele through licensed and co-branded collections, including indoor/outdoor furniture, accessories, lighting, and hundreds of textile designs.
