= Green Level, North Carolina =

- Town
- Seal

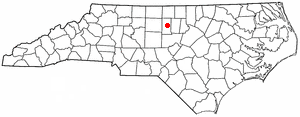
- Location of Green Level, North Carolina

- Location within North Carolina Location within the United States
- Coordinates: 36°07′24″N 79°20′45″W
- Country: United States
- State: North Carolina
- County: Alamance
- Incorporated: July 17, 1990

Government
  - Mayor: Gerald (Jose) McBroom

Area
  - Total: 1.50 sq mi (3.89 km^{2})
  - Land: 1.50 sq mi (3.89 km^{2})
  - Water: 0.0039 sq mi (0.01 km^{2})
- Elevation: 630 ft (190 m)

Population (2020)
  - Total: 3,152
  - Density: 2,099.9/sq mi (810.76/km^{2})
- Time zone: UTC-5 (Eastern (EST))
  - Summer (DST): UTC-4 (EDT)
- ZIP code: 27217
- Area code: 336
- FIPS code: 37-27870
- GNIS feature ID: 2406610
- Website: greenlevelnc.gov

Green Level is a town in Alamance County, North Carolina, United States. It is part of the Burlington, North Carolina Metropolitan Statistical Area. As of the 2020 census, the population was 3,156.

== History ==
Green Level was incorporated on July 17, 1990.

== Geography ==
According to the United States Census Bureau, the town has a total area of 1.4 square miles (3.5 km^{2}), of which 0.0023 square miles (0.006 km^{2}), or 0.17%, is water.

== Demographics ==
Historical population
Census	Pop.	Note	%±
2000	2,042		—
2010	2,100		2.8%
2020	3,152		50.1%
2021 (est.)	3,174	▲	0.7%
U.S. Decennial Census

=== Racial and ethnic composition ===
Green Level town, North Carolina – Racial and ethnic composition Note: the US Census treats Hispanic/Latino as an ethnic category. This table excludes Latinos from the racial categories and assigns them to a separate category. Hispanics/Latinos may be of any race.
Race / Ethnicity (NH = Non-Hispanic)	Pop 2000	Pop 2010	Pop 2020	% 2000	% 2010	% 2020
White alone (NH)	233	280	416	11.41%	13.33%	13.20%
Black or African American alone (NH)	1,490	1,144	1,459	72.97%	54.48%	46.29%
Native American or Alaska Native alone (NH)	12	8	5	0.59%	0.38%	0.16%
Asian alone (NH)	13	1	17	0.64%	0.05%	0.54%
Native Hawaiian or Pacific Islander alone (NH)	0	0	0	0.00%	0.00%	0.00%
Other Race alone (NH)	0	1	18	0.00%	0.05%	0.57%
Mixed race or Multiracial (NH)	19	16	107	0.93%	0.76%	3.39%
Hispanic or Latino (any race)	275	650	1,130	13.47%	30.95%	35.85%
Total	2,042	2,100	3,152	100.00%	100.00%	100.00%

=== 2020 census ===
As of the 2020 census, Green Level had a population of 3,152. The median age was 35.1 years. 27.9% of residents were under the age of 18 and 13.6% of residents were 65 years of age or older. For every 100 females there were 97.9 males, and for every 100 females age 18 and over there were 92.7 males age 18 and over.

100.0% of residents lived in urban areas, while 0.0% lived in rural areas.

There were 1,112 households in Green Level, including 489 family households. Of these households, 38.8% had children under the age of 18 living in them. Of all households, 37.7% were married-couple households, 20.8% were households with a male householder and no spouse or partner present, and 32.2% were households with a female householder and no spouse or partner present. About 20.9% of all households were made up of individuals, and 7.8% had someone living alone who was 65 years of age or older.

There were 1,217 housing units, of which 8.6% were vacant. The homeowner vacancy rate was 1.0% and the rental vacancy rate was 8.4%.

=== 2000 census ===
As of the census of 2000, there were 2,042 people, 741 households, and 555 families residing in the town. The population density was 1,452.8 inhabitants per square mile (560.9/km^{2}). There were 823 housing units at an average density of 585.5 per square mile (226.1/km^{2}). The racial makeup of the town was 14.69% White, 73.41% African American, 0.78% Native American, 0.64% Asian, 8.91% from other races, and 1.57% from two or more races. Hispanic or Latino of any race were 13.47% of the population.

There were 741 households, out of which 33.5% had children under the age of 18 living with them, 44.5% were married couples living together, 23.5% had a female householder with no husband present, and 25.1% were non-families. 21.2% of all households were made up of individuals, and 8.1% had someone living alone who was 65 years of age or older. The average household size was 2.76 and the average family size was 3.18.

In the town, the population was spread out, with 27.9% under the age of 18, 8.0% from 18 to 24, 31.0% from 25 to 44, 22.4% from 45 to 64, and 10.7% who were 65 years of age or older. The median age was 35 years. For every 100 females, there were 88.6 males. For every 100 females age 18 and over, there were 86.5 males.

The median income for a household in the town was $31,793, and the median income for a family was $34,242. Males had a median income of $23,143 versus $21,161 for females. The per capita income for the town was $12,403. About 10.3% of families and 11.9% of the population were below the poverty line, including 12.9% of those under age 18 and 21.4% of those age 65 or over.
