= Cane Creek Mountains =

Mountain in North Carolina, US

- Bass Mountains
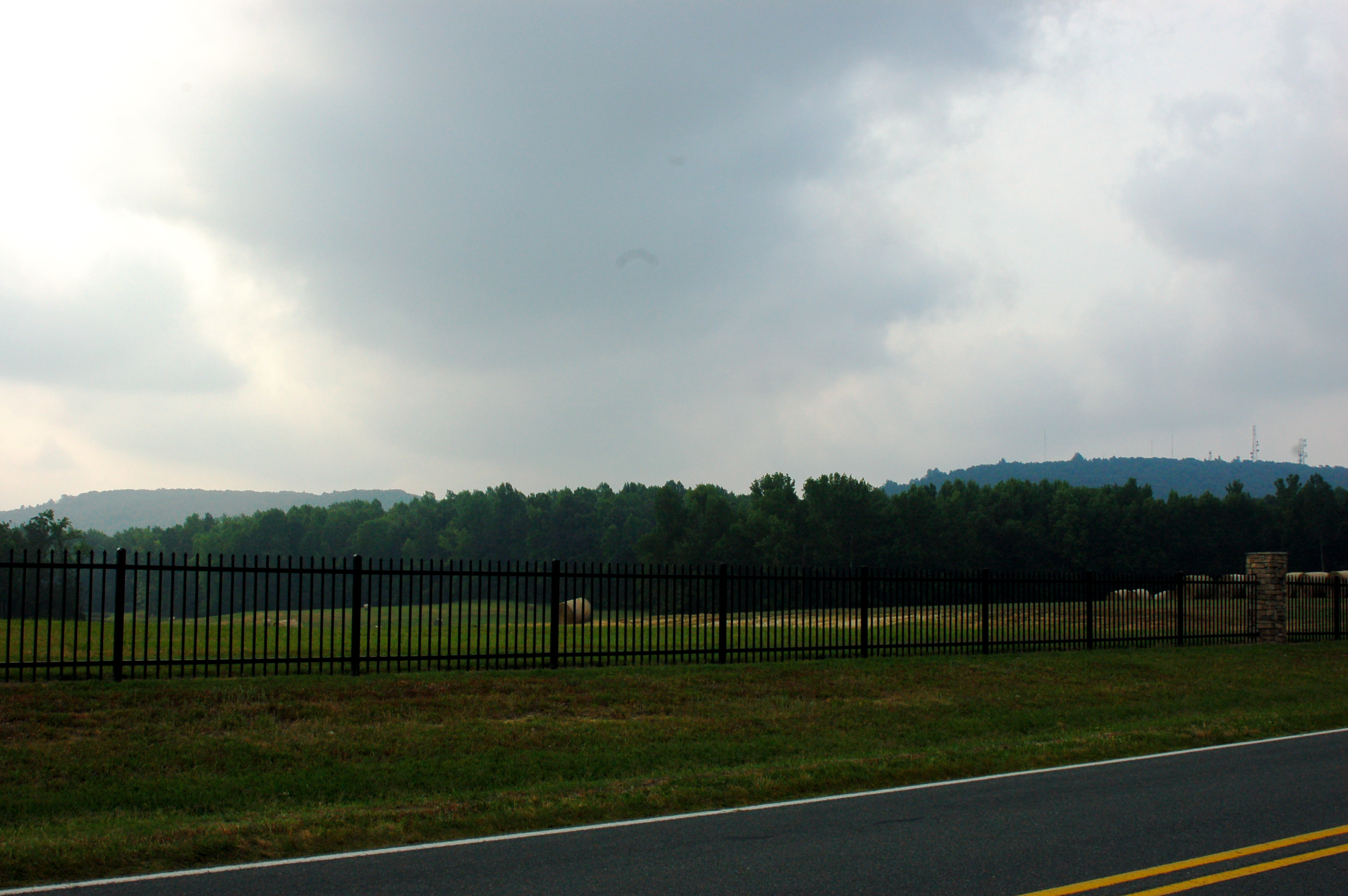
- Bass Mountain (Left) and Cane Creek Mountain (Right), 2 of the highest peaks in the range.

Highest point
- Peak: Cane Creek Mountain
- Elevation: 301 m (988 ft)
- Coordinates: 35°56′50.66″N 79°26′08.14″W

Dimensions
- Length: 21.17 km (13.15 mi) SW
- Width: 8.91 km (5.54 mi) SE

Geography
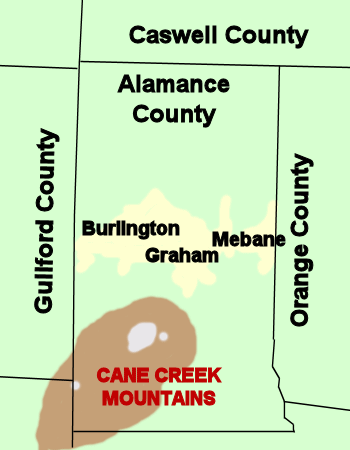
- Location of Cane Creek Mountains in Alamance County in North Carolina
- Country: United States
- State: North Carolina
- Region: Alamance County

Geology
- Orogeny: Alleghenian orogeny

Cane Creek Mountains is a small mountain range that lies south of Burlington, North Carolina. The range covers an area including Alamance County, Guilford County, Randolph County, and Chatham County in North Carolina.

== Formation ==
The mountains are typical of the rolling terrain of the piedmont region of North Carolina, and are somewhat similar in formation to the nearby Caraway Mountains and Uwharrie Mountains. The Cane Creek Mountains may have formed as a part of the larger coastal range that was once the Uwharries, which are thought to have formed as a part of the Alleghenian or Appalachian orogeny 300–350 million years ago during the formation and rifting of Pangaea. This earlier range is thought to have had peaks more than 20,000 feet (6,100 m) high, which would rival the Himalayas, the Andes, and the Alaska Range. However, erosion has worn this old mountain range down. The highest peaks of this old range are now found in the Appalachian Mountains on the eastern coast of North America and in the Anti-Atlas Mountains of Morocco in Africa.

The heavily eroded hills of piedmont, including the Cane Creek Mountains, are remnants of the sizable mountain chain.

== Geology ==
The Cane Creek Mountains lie in the Carolina Slate Belt, a belt that consists of heated and deformed volcanic and sedimentary rocks. The belt is best known for old abandoned gold mines. North Carolina led the nation in gold production for 50 years, between the discovery of a 17-pound (7.7 kg) gold nugget at the Reed Gold Mine in Cabarrus County, NC near Charlotte in 1799 and the discovery of gold during the California Gold Rush of 1849. Limited gold mining continues to take place, but several mining companies continue to operate, both on the slate belt and in and near the Cane Creek Mountains. Most mineral production in the area is crushed stone for road aggregate and pyrophyllite for factories, ceramics, filler, paint and insecticide carriers.

== Geography ==
The northern edge of the mountains begins on the southern bank of Great Alamance Creek, approximately 4 miles (6.4 km) south of Interstate 40 in Graham and runs in a southwesterly direction towards Liberty in Randolph County. The range covers much of the southwest quadrant of Alamance County. While much of the range is a series of rolling hills that are common throughout the North Carolina Piedmont Region, there are several peaks in the Cane Creek Mountains located north of Snow Camp. The highest point in the range and in Alamance County is Cane Creek Mountain, which is approximately 987 feet (301 m).

Perhaps the most famous peak in the range is the 267 m (902 ft) Bass Mountain, the former home of an annual bluegrass music festival. Contrary to some local belief, Bass Mountain is not the highest peak in the range, although the range is occasionally referred to as the "Bass Mountains".

== History ==
The mountains and Alamance County were home to the local Native American tribes, including the Sissipahaw. The area saw major activity during the American Colonial and Revolutionary period, with several battles taking place in and near the range, including Pyle's Massacre and the Battle of Alamance. There are several cave sites throughout the mountains where local historians theorize that small military parties may have been able to fortify their position.

== Current Use ==
The mountains are home to families, farms, and television, radio, and cellular communications towers. There is also a fire tower located on top of Cane Creek Mountain that is no longer safe for use.

== Nearby Mountains ==
The piedmont region of North Carolina is home to several small mountain ranges and monadnocks, including:

- Stony Creek Mountain - a monadnock in Northern Alamance County that rises to 288 m (938 ft)
- Caraway Mountains - a small range in Randolph County, to the southwest
- Uwharrie Mountains - a range of mountains in four counties southwest of the Cane Creeks
- Occoneechee Mountain - a monadnock near the Eno River in Orange County to the east
