= Glen Raven, North Carolina =

- Census-designated place
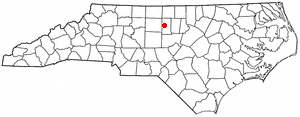
- Location of Glen Raven, North Carolina
- Coordinates: 36°07′29″N 79°27′53″W
- Country: United States
- State: North Carolina
- County: Alamance

Area
  - Total: 3.59 sq mi (9.30 km^{2})
  - Land: 3.51 sq mi (9.09 km^{2})
  - Water: 0.081 sq mi (0.21 km^{2})
- Elevation: 640 ft (200 m)

Population (2020)
  - Total: 3,239
  - Density: 923.2/sq mi (356.44/km^{2})
- Time zone: UTC-5 (Eastern (EST))
  - Summer (DST): UTC-4 (EDT)
- ZIP code: 27215
- Area code: 336
- FIPS code: 37-26460
- GNIS feature ID: 2402527

Glen Raven is a census-designated place (CDP) in Alamance County, North Carolina, United States. It is part of the Burlington, North Carolina Metropolitan Statistical Area. As of the 2020 census, Glen Raven had a population of 3,239.

== History ==
The area of current Glen Raven was once occupied by Altamahaw-Ossipee Native American people.

Local fabric manufacturer Glen Raven, Inc. was founded by John Quentin Grant.

== Geography ==
According to the United States Census Bureau, the CDP has a total area of 9.3 square kilometres (3.6 sq mi), of which 3.5 square miles (9.1 km^{2}) is land and 0.077 square miles (0.2 km^{2}), or 2.25%, is water.

== Topography ==
Glen Raven is in the Piedmont Triad region of North Carolina and is located at an elevation of 700 feet (210 m) directly north of the city of Burlington. Glen Raven extends north to the Haw River at an elevation of about 540 feet (160 m).

== Business and economy ==
Glen Raven, Inc. constitutes a major part of the town's economy. The company was founded in 1880, starting out as a cotton mill making only apparel. The company has grown tremendously since, performing, dying, spinning, weaving and finishing, all the way down to distribution and logistics. The company created the fabric used to make the American flag that was planted on the moon.

== Education ==
The closest school to Glen Raven is a two-minute drive to Hillcrest Elementary School in Burlington. The students in Glen Raven go to Hillcrest as their elementary school, Turrentine as their middle school, and Walter M. Williams as their high school, all located in Burlington.

== Demographics ==
Historical population
Census	Pop.	Note	%±
2020	3,239		—
U.S. Decennial Census

=== 2020 census ===
As of the 2020 census, Glen Raven had a population of 3,239. The median age was 37.1 years. 26.8% of residents were under the age of 18 and 13.2% of residents were 65 years of age or older. For every 100 females there were 102.9 males, and for every 100 females age 18 and over there were 106.4 males age 18 and over.

87.6% of residents lived in urban areas, while 12.4% lived in rural areas.

There were 1,185 households in Glen Raven, of which 37.1% had children under the age of 18 living in them. Of all households, 49.4% were married-couple households, 17.1% were households with a male householder and no spouse or partner present, and 25.8% were households with a female householder and no spouse or partner present. About 23.4% of all households were made up of individuals and 9.5% had someone living alone who was 65 years of age or older.

There were 1,272 housing units, of which 6.8% were vacant. The homeowner vacancy rate was 2.1% and the rental vacancy rate was 4.4%.

Racial composition as of the 2020 census
Race	Number	Percent
White	2,126	65.6%
Black or African American	482	14.9%
American Indian and Alaska Native	20	0.6%
Asian	21	0.6%
Native Hawaiian and Other Pacific Islander	7	0.2%
Some other race	356	11.0%
Two or more races	227	7.0%
Hispanic or Latino (of any race)	535	16.5%

=== 2010 census ===
As of the census of 2010, there were 2,750 people, 1,038 households, and 779 families residing in the CDP. The population density was 785.7 inhabitants per square mile (303.4/km^{2}). There was 1,152 housing units at an average density of 329.1 per square mile (127.1/km^{2}). The racial makeup of the CDP was 78.7% White, 12.5% Black or African-American, 0.6% Native American, 0.6% Asian, 0.04% Native Hawaiian or other Pacific Islander, 5.5% some other race, and 2.1% two or more races. Persons of Hispanic or Latino ethnicity (of any race) made up 12.4% of the population.

There were 1,038 households, out of which 36.9% had children under the age of 18 living with them. 53.9% of households were headed by married couples, while 15.1% had a female householder with no husband present.
