= Alamance, North Carolina =

- Village
- Seal

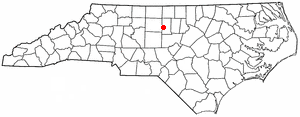
- Location of Alamance, North Carolina

- Location within North Carolina Location within the United States Location within North America
- Coordinates: 36°01′43″N 79°29′20″W
- Country: United States
- State: North Carolina
- County: Alamance
- Established: 1837
- Incorporated (village): 1887
- Incorporated (town-village): 1979

Government
  - Mayor: Donald B. Tichy

Area
  - Total: 0.80 sq mi (2.07 km^{2})
  - Land: 0.80 sq mi (2.06 km^{2})
  - Water: 0.0077 sq mi (0.02 km^{2})
- Elevation: 587 ft (179 m)

Population (2020)
  - Total: 988
  - Density: 1,242.6/sq mi (479.76/km^{2})
- Time zone: UTC-5 (Eastern (EST))
  - Summer (DST): UTC-4 (EDT)
- ZIP code: 27201
- Area code: 336
- FIPS code: 37-00640
- GNIS feature ID: 2407406
- Website: villageofalamance.com

Alamance is a village in Alamance County, North Carolina, United States. It is part of the Burlington, North Carolina Metropolitan Statistical Area. The population was 988 at the 2020 census.

== History ==
Alamance was the site of the largest conflict of the War of the Regulation on May 16, 1771. Governor William Tryon's decisive victory over a force of 2,000 Regulators effectively ended the war (Battle of Alamance). The region around Alamance was also the site of a defeat of British Loyalists in the American Revolutionary War in a skirmish known as Pyle's Massacre on February 25, 1781.

Alamance played a significant role in the development of the textile industry in the South. In 1837 Edwin Michael Holt, son of a local farmer, built the Alamance Cotton Mill at Alamance. In 1849, Holt began converting this spinning mill into a looming mill that produced the well-known "Alamance Plaids." This was the first factory-dyed cotton cloth produced south of the Potomac. The Holt family subsequently built scores of mills across the state, as well as becoming involved in banking, railroads, politics and other ventures.

The Alamance Battleground State Historic Site, Alamance Mill Village Historic District, and L. Banks Holt House, are listed on the National Register of Historic Places.

The name is said to have been given by German settlers, from the Native American word allamanca.

== Geography ==
According to the United States Census Bureau, the village has a total area of 0.77 square miles (2.0 km^{2}), of which 0.0039 square miles (0.01 km^{2}), or 0.63%, is water.

=== Climate ===
The climate in this area is characterized by relatively high temperatures and evenly distributed precipitation throughout the year. According to the Köppen Climate Classification system, Alamance has a Humid subtropical climate, abbreviated "Cfa" on climate maps.

Climate data for Alamance, North Carolina
Month	Jan	Feb	Mar	Apr	May	Jun	Jul	Aug	Sep	Oct	Nov	Dec	Year
Mean daily maximum °C (°F)	9 (49)	12 (53)	17 (62)	22 (72)	26 (79)	30 (86)	32 (90)	31 (88)	28 (82)	22 (72)	17 (62)	11 (52)	22 (71)
Mean daily minimum °C (°F)	9 (48)	−2 (29)	−1 (31)	3 (38)	8 (46)	13 (55)	18 (64)	20 (68)	19 (66)	15 (59)	8 (47)	3 (38)	−1 (31)
Average precipitation mm (inches)	89 (3.5)	84 (3.3)	100 (4)	86 (3.4)	94 (3.7)	100 (4)	120 (4.6)	110 (4.2)	100 (4)	81 (3.2)	76 (3)	81 (3.2)	1,100 (44)
Source: Weatherbase

== Demographics ==
Historical population
Census	Pop.	Note	%±
1980	320		—
1990	258		−19.4%
2000	310		20.2%
2010	951		206.8%
2020	988		3.9%
2022 (est.)	1,002	▲	1.4%
U.S. Decennial Census

=== 2020 census ===
Alamance racial composition
Race	Number	Percentage
White (non-Hispanic)	834	84.41%
Black or African American (non-Hispanic)	66	6.68%
Native American	2	0.2%
Asian	8	0.81%
Other/Mixed	36	3.64%
Hispanic or Latino	42	4.25%

As of the 2020 United States census, there were 988 people, 454 households, and 355 families residing in the village.

=== 2010 census ===
As of the census of 2010, there were 951 people, 365 households, and 291 families residing in the village. The population density was 1,285.1 inhabitants per square mile (496.2/km^{2}). There were 401 housing units at an average density of 541.9 per square mile (209.2/km^{2}). The racial makeup of the village was 94.8% White, 2.9% African American, 0.2% Native American, 1.1% Asian, and 0.4% from two or more races. Hispanic or Latino of any race were 1.3% of the population.

There were 365 households, out of which 35.9% had children under the age of 18 living with them, 70.7% were married couples living together, 7.7% had a female householder with no husband present, and 20.3% were non-families. 17.3% of all households were made up of individuals, and 8.3% had someone living alone who was 65 years of age or older. The average household size was 2.61 and the average family size was 2.94.

In the village, the population was spread out, with 25.6% under the age of 19, 4.1% from 20 to 24, 29.6% from 25 to 44, 28% from 45 to 64, and 12.5% who were 65 years of age or older. The median age was 40.2 years.

The median income for a household in the village was $84,250, and the median income for a family was $93,125. The per capita income for the village was $35,037. About 1.1% of families and 4.4% of the population were below the poverty line, including 4.2% of those under age 18 and 21.9% of those age 65 or over.
