= Alamance Mill Village Historic District =

Historic district in North Carolina, United States

- U.S. National Register of Historic Places
- U.S. Historic district
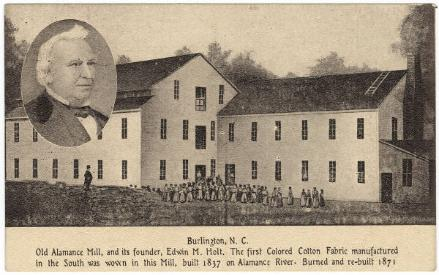
- Alamance Mill circa 1880

- Location within North Carolina Location within the United States
- Location: 3927-3981 NC 62 S, Great Alamance Creek W of NC 62S, Alamance, North Carolina
- Coordinates: 36°02′22″N 79°29′14″W
- Area: 0 acres (0 ha)
- NRHP reference No.: 07000821
- Added to NRHP: August 16, 2007

Alamance Mill Village Historic District is a national historic district located at Alamance, Alamance County, North Carolina. It encompasses 18 contributing buildings and 1 contributing structure built between 1840 and 1947 in Alamance. The district includes 15 mill houses, a warehouse, and the mill dam and connected remains of the head race.

It was added to the National Register of Historic Places in 2007.
