= Altamahaw, North Carolina =

- Census-designated place
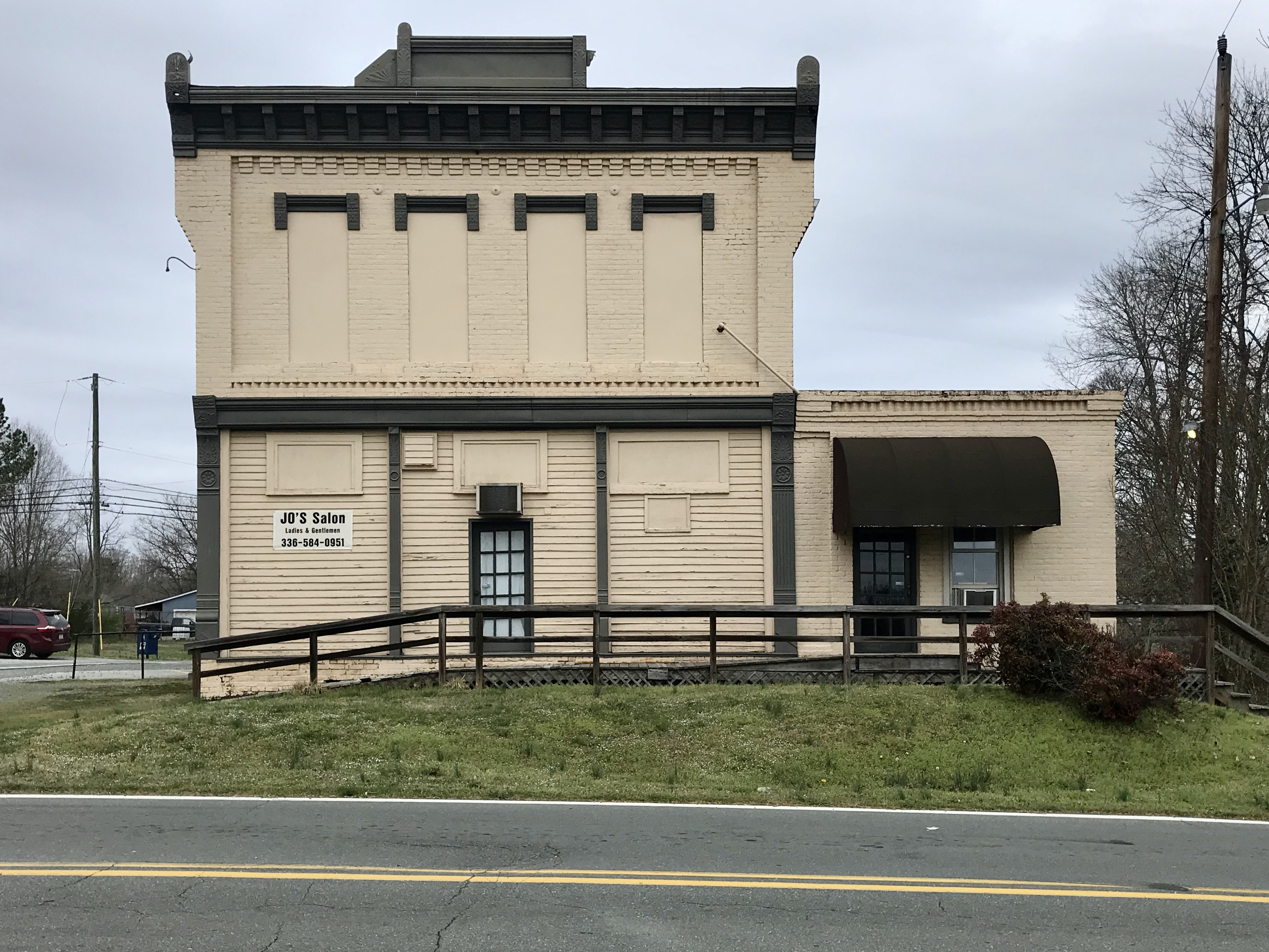
- Former Altamahaw mill store building

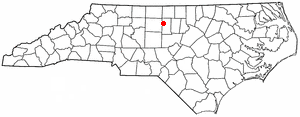
- Location of Altamahaw, North Carolina
- Coordinates: 36°10′55″N 79°29′55″W
- Country: United States
- State: North Carolina
- County: Alamance
- Founded: 1860

Area
  - Total: 1.39 sq mi (3.59 km^{2})
  - Land: 1.36 sq mi (3.52 km^{2})
  - Water: 0.031 sq mi (0.08 km^{2})
- Elevation: 663 ft (202 m)

Population (2020)
  - Total: 334
  - Density: 246.1/sq mi (95.01/km^{2})
- Time zone: UTC-5 (Eastern (EST))
  - Summer (DST): UTC-4 (EDT)
- ZIP code: 27244
- Area codes: 336 and 743
- FIPS code: 37-01150
- GNIS feature ID: 2402639

Altamahaw is a census-designated place (CDP) in Alamance County, North Carolina, United States. It is part of the Burlington, North Carolina Metropolitan Statistical Area. As of the 2020 census, Altamahaw had a population of 334. The community was listed as Altamahaw-Ossipee at the 2000 census. The town of Ossipee incorporated in 2002 and the remainder of the territory was reassigned as the Altamahaw CDP.

== History ==
The Altamahaw Mill Office was added to the National Register of Historic Places in 1984.

== Geography ==
Altamahaw is located off State Route 87 about 7 miles (11 km) north of the city of Burlington.

According to the United States Census Bureau, the CDP has a total area of 1.4 square miles (3.6 km^{2}), of which 1.4 square miles (3.5 km^{2}) is land and 0.039 square miles (0.1 km^{2}), or 2.56%, is water.

== Demographics ==
Historical population
Census	Pop.	Note	%±
2020	334		—
U.S. Decennial Census

As of the census of 2000, there were 996 people, 399 households, and 276 families residing in the CDP. The population density was 430.8 inhabitants per square mile (166.3/km^{2}). There were 436 housing units at an average density of 188.6 per square mile (72.8/km^{2}). The racial makeup of the CDP was 89.86% White, 9.44% African American, 0.10% Native American, 0.40% from other races, and 0.20% from two or more races. Hispanic or Latino of any race were 1.00% of the population.

There were 399 households, out of which 35.3% had children under the age of 18 living with them, 52.6% were married couples living together, 11.3% had a female householder with no husband present, and 30.6% were non-families. 26.8% of all households were made up of individuals, and 11.8% had someone living alone who was 65 years of age or older. The average household size was 2.50 and the average family size was 3.04.

In the CDP, the population was spread out, with 26.4% under the age of 18, 6.6% from 18 to 24, 32.3% from 25 to 44, 23.1% from 45 to 64, and 11.5% who were 65 years of age or older. The median age was 37 years. For every 100 females there were 95.7 males. For every 100 females age 18 and over, there were 89.4 males.

The median income for a household in the CDP was $35,375, and the median income for a family was $46,250. Males had a median income of $24,250 versus $19,228 for females. The per capita income for the CDP was $17,541. About 5.7% of families and 8.7% of the population were below the poverty line, including 10.8% of those under age 18 and 17.1% of those age 65 or over.
