= Bellemont, North Carolina =

- Unincorporated community
- Location of Bellemont in North Carolina Bellemont, North Carolina (the United States)
- Coordinates: 36°01′32″N 79°26′35″W
- Country: United States
- State: North Carolina
- County: Alamance
- Elevation: 554 ft (169 m)
- Time zone: UTC-5 (Eastern (EST))
  - Summer (DST): UTC-4 (EDT)
- Area code: 336
- GNIS feature ID: 1019072

Bellemont is an unincorporated community in Alamance County, North Carolina, United States.

Bellemont is located on North Carolina Highway 49, east of Alamance, and 4.3 miles (6.9 km) south-southeast of downtown Burlington. The community is located at the junction with Bellemont Alamance/Mt. Hermon Road.

The Bellemont Mill Village Historic District and Kernodle-Pickett House are listed on the National Register of Historic Places.

== Notable person ==
- Leo Moon, Cleveland Indians pitcher
