= Textile Heritage Museum =

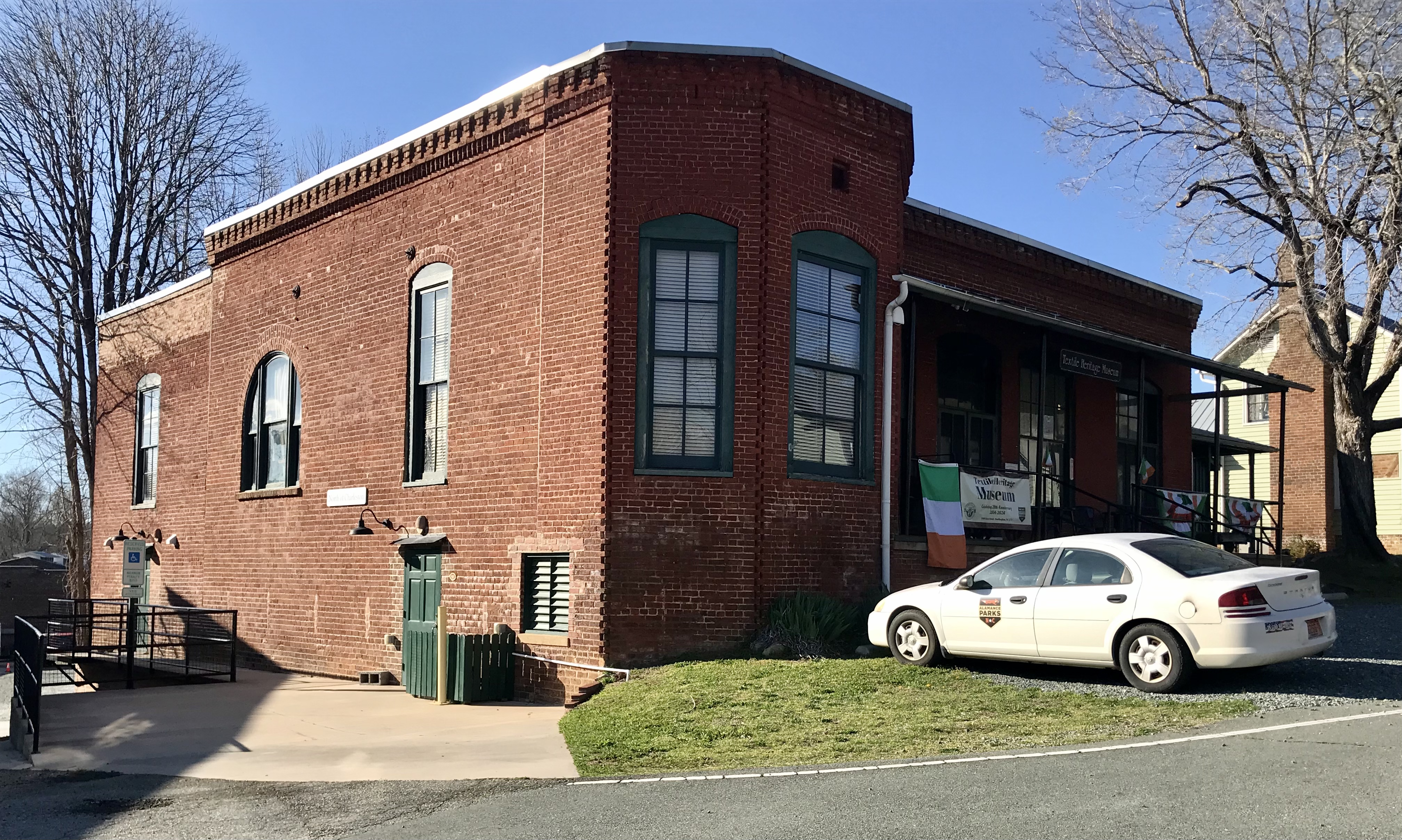
- Museum building

- Location within North Carolina
- Established: 2001
- Location: Glencoe, North Carolina
- Coordinates: 36.1389815°N 79.4302643°W
- Type: history museum
- Visitors: 2000 (2017)
- Website: textileheritagemuseum.org

The Textile Heritage Museum is a history museum located in Glencoe, North Carolina along the Haw River. focused on the textile industry and life in mill towns in North Carolina and the American south. Located within the Glencoe Mill Village Historic District, which was added to the National Register of Historic Places in 1979, the museum is housed in the former management offices and company store built in 1880.

Glencoe developed at the time when the shift from water to steam power was seriously considered by cotton mill builders in Alamance County. Glencoe's existent mill houses, original mill buildings, and 1880- 1894 water-powered machinery, make it one of the best preserved cotton mill villages in Alamance County. Although no early textile machinery remains, the village presents important evidence relating to the earliest forms and development of the textile industry in the county.

Exhibits include a Jacquard loom along with machines used to create and lace punch cards, knitting machines and the raw materials which describe textile production at the mill and others like it in the state. Volunteers also demonstrate a turn of the century hosiery knitting machine. Products available in the company store during its operation between 1880 and 1954 are also on display.

The museum is run by a non-profit corporation which also maintains archives of the Glencoe Mills including business records, fabric samples and artifacts chronicling what life was like in a mill town such resident's wedding gowns and a band uniform from the company band.

== See also ==
- Glencoe Mill Village Historic District
