= Glencoe, North Carolina =

Glencoe
- Unincorporated community
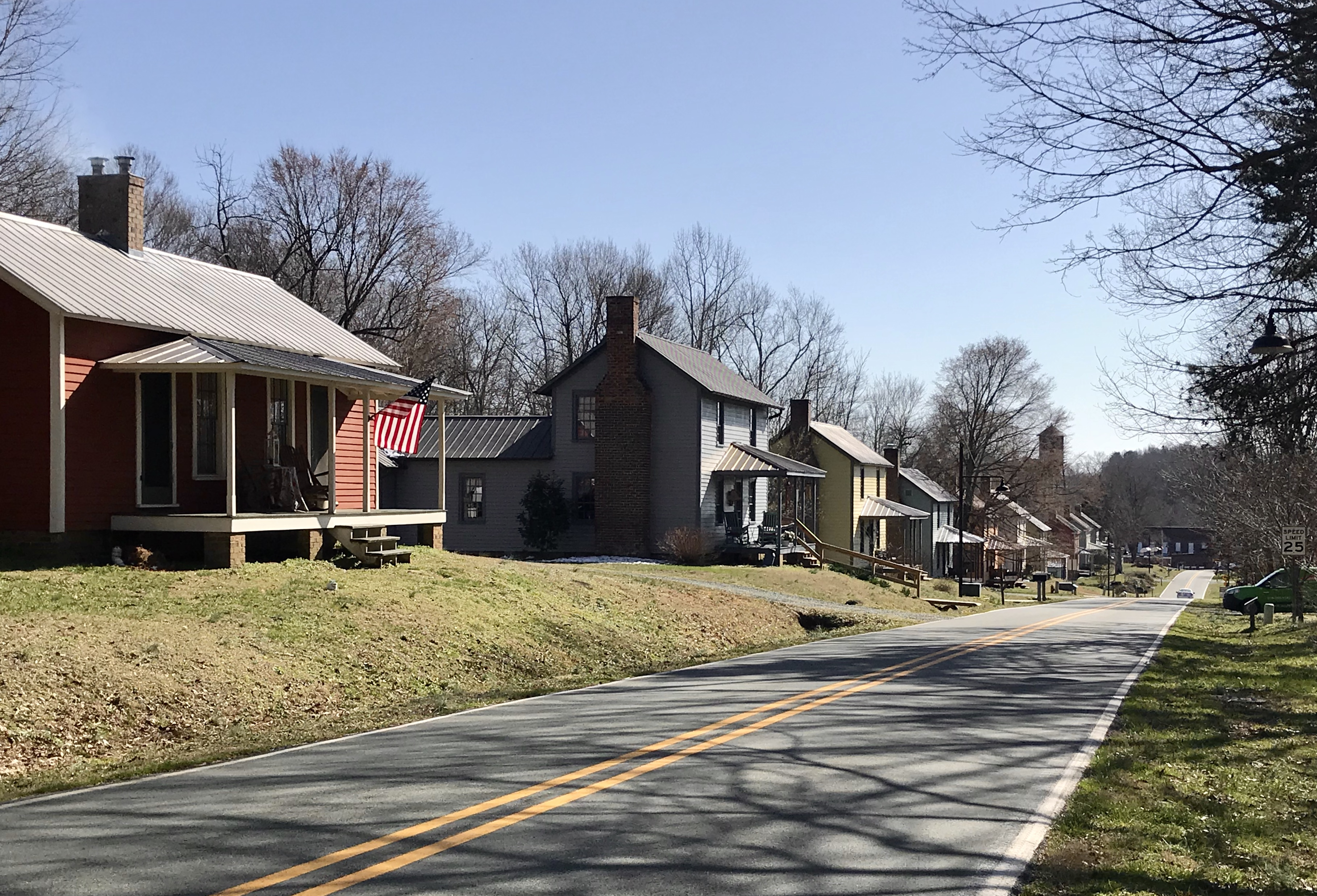
- Glencoe mill village

- Location within the state of North Carolina
- Coordinates: 36°8′20″N 79°25′40″W
- Country: United States
- State: North Carolina
- County: Alamance
- Elevation: 577 ft (176 m)
- Time zone: UTC-5 (Eastern (EST))
  - Summer (DST): UTC-4 (EDT)
- GNIS feature ID: 1020446

Glencoe is an unincorporated community in Alamance County, North Carolina, United States on North Carolina Highway 62, north-northeast of downtown Burlington.

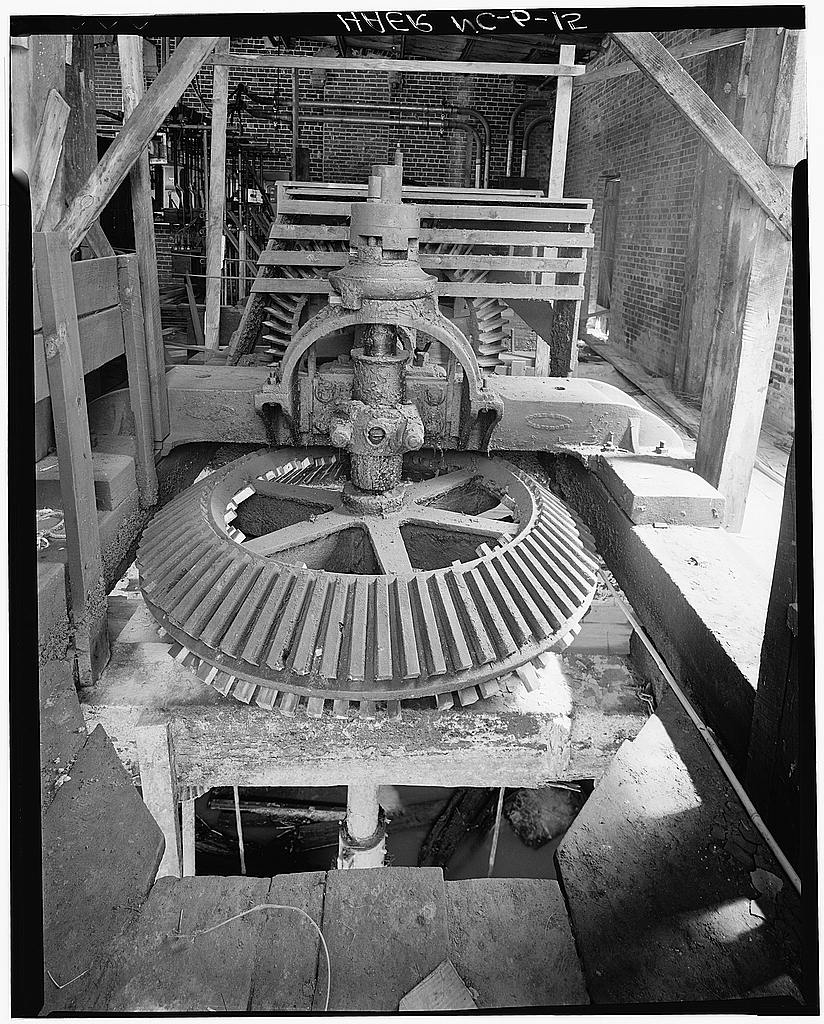
Interior view of the power house, Glencoe Mills, 1978

It is located on the Haw River. Glencoe is located north of Morgantown, and west-northwest of Carolina, a neighboring unincorporated settlement also on the Haw River. Glencoe is also home to Textile Mill Town, and Textile Heritage Museum.

The Glencoe Mill Village Historic District and Glencoe School are listed on the National Register of Historic Places.
