= Lee's Legion =

- Active: 1776–1783
- Allegiance: Continental Congress of the United States
- Type: Dragoons; Light infantry
- Size: 180 infantry, 100 cavalry
- Part of: Continental Army
- Engagements: Guilford Court House and Yorktown

Commanders
- Notable commanders: Henry "Light Horse Harry" Lee

Lee's Legion (also known as the 2nd Partisan Corps) was a military unit within the Continental Army during the American Revolution. It primarily served in the Southern Theater of Operations, and gained a reputation for efficiency, bravery on the battlefield and ruthlessness equal to that of the British Legion.

The original unit was raised June 8, 1776, at Williamsburg, Virginia, under the command of Henry "Light Horse Harry" Lee for service with the 1st Continental Light Dragoons of the Continental Army. On April 7, 1778, the Legion left the 1st CLDs and became known as Lee's Legion. It included elements of both cavalry and foot, and typically was uniformed with short green woolen jackets and white linen or doeskin pants, somewhat mimicking the British Legion in appearance. The unit first saw action in September of that year, defeating a Hessian regiment in an ambush. When Lord Cornwallis moved his British Army into North Carolina, Lee's Legion entered South Carolina to protect that colony, to intimidate Loyalists and harass British expeditions. Often, the Legion served with Francis Marion and Thomas Sumter in these missions. In 1781, it participated in Pyle's massacre and the siege of Ninety Six.

The Legion saw considerable action at the Battle of Guilford Court House, and the retaking of South Carolina. The Legion was disbanded at Winchester, Virginia, on November 15, 1783.

United States Marshal Robert Forsyth was a member of Lee's Legion.
