= Indian Valley Municipal Golf Course =

The Valley Golf Course
- Location of The Valley in the United States
- 36.18°N 79.63°W

Club information
- Location: Burlington, NC
- Established: 1968
- Type: Public
- Owner: City of Burlington, NC
- Operator: City of Burlington, NC
- Tota holes: 18
- Tournaments: Alamance County Amateur; Alamance County All-County High School Tournament; Alamance County Senior Amateur
- Greens: Bent Grass
- Fairways: Bermuda Grass
- Website: https://www.golfatthevalley.com/

Course Information:
- Designed by: Ellis Maples
- Par: 70
- Length: 6,610 (from black tees)
- Course rating: 71.3 (from black tees)
- Slope rating: 116 (from black tees)

The Valley Golf Course, formally called Indian Valley Municipal Golf Course, is an 18-hole municipal golf course located in Burlington, North Carolina. It is owned and operated by the city of Burlington. Prior to 2021, it was known as Indian Valley.

The Valley is an 18-hole, par-70 golf course that is open year-round to the general public. The course has held several competitive tournaments in recent years, including the Elon University Family Weekend Golf Tournament. The course was built in 1968, and designed by Ellis Maples.

The Valley has hosted the Alamance All-County High School Golf Championships for several years, as well as several local mid-amateur tournaments in the past.

== History ==
Indian Valley Golf Course was constructed on the banks of the Haw River in Burlington in 1968 and was designed by Ellis Maples. The course has been owned and operated by the city of Burlington since its inception. The main goal of the course is and has been to provide affordable golf for any level of golfer in the Piedmont Triad region of North Carolina. Soon after the construction of the course, the driving range was added to the facility, which is also accessible to the public.

In 2021, the golf course was rebranded, and is now operated as "The Valley Golf Course."

== Tournaments ==
The Valley has hosted several competitive tournaments in its history, including recent mid-amateur tournaments in the summer of 2013 and the annual Elon University Family Weekend Tournament. The course has held the Alamance County Amateur, the Alamance County All-County High School Tournament, and the Alamance County Senior Amateur in recent years.

== Course designer ==
The Valley Golf Course was designed by Ellis Maples (1909–1984), who was a prolific golf course designer and architect throughout North Carolina. Maples began working on golf courses under the tutelage of the arguably the greatest designer to have ever lived, Donald Ross. Maples got his start in golf course design under his father, who was the construction superintendent at Pinehurst Country Club for the construction of the first four courses. He served in the U.S. Armed Forces during World War II, then in 1953 he opened his own golf course architectural firm. Maples and his company went on to design over 70 courses in the Southeast region over the next thirty years, including Indian Valley Golf Course and Pinehurst #5. Ellis Maples died in 1984 and his son Dan Maples took over the family golf course design company.
