= Bellemont Mill Village Historic District =

Historic district in North Carolina, United States

- U.S. National Register of Historic Places
- U.S. Historic district
- Location within North Carolina Location within the United States
- Location: E and W side of NC 49, S of jct. with Great Alamance Creek, Bellemont, North Carolina
- Coordinates: 36°01′33″N 79°26′34″W
- Area: 9.8 acres (4.0 ha)
- Built: 1879-1880
- Built by: Davidson, Berry
- Architectural style: I-house
- NRHP reference No.: 87001099
- Added to NRHP: July 1, 1987

Bellemont Mill Village Historic District is a national historic district located at Bellemont, Alamance County, North Carolina. It encompasses 24 contributing buildings built between 1879 and 1880 in Bellemont. The district includes the three-story brick Bellemont Cotton Mill and 23 associated one and two-story frame mill houses.

It was added to the National Register of Historic Places in 1987.
