= Kernodle-Pickett House =

Historic house in North Carolina, United States

- U.S. National Register of Historic Places
- Location within North Carolina Location within the United States
- Location: Jct. of NC 1136 and NC 1131, Bellemont, North Carolina
- Coordinates: 36°1′18″N 79°27′43″W
- Area: 4.4 acres (1.8 ha)
- Built: 1895-1896
- Architectural style: Queen Anne
- NRHP reference No.: 87000454
- Added to NRHP: March 23, 1987

Kernodle-Pickett House is a historic home located at Bellemont, Alamance County, North Carolina. It was built in 1895–1896, and consists of a 2 1/2-story, L-shaped frame main block with 1 1/2-story frame wings in the Queen Anne style. It sits on a brick pier foundation and has a multi-gable roof with embossed tin shingles. The house features a variety of molded, sawn, and turned millwork.

It was added to the National Register of Historic Places in 1987.
