= Pyle's Massacre =

1781 battle of the American Revolutionary War

Coordinates: 36°03′0″N 79°27′1″W

- Part of American Revolutionary War
Date	24 February 1781
Location	present-day Alamance County, North Carolina
Result	American victory

Belligerents
United States; Catawba	Great Britain

Commanders and leaders
Andrew Pickens; Henry Lee	John Pyle (WIA) (surrendered)

Strength
600 militia	400 militia

Casualties and losses
1 man wounded 1 horse killed	93 killed 250 wounded

Pyle's Massacre (also known as Pyle's defeat, Pyle's hacking match or the Battle of Haw River) was an engagement fought in present-day Alamance County, North Carolina, on February 24, 1781, during the American Revolutionary War. The battle was fought between Patriot troops attached to the Continental Army under Colonel Henry Lee III and Loyalist North Carolina militiamen commanded by John Pyle. Due to the unique uniforms worn by Lee's men, the Loyalists mistakenly believed they were the British Legion, who were en route to reinforce Pyle. When Lee's men opened fire, they took Pyle's forces totally by surprise. This resulted in an extremely lopsided victory for Lee, and Pyle's command was scattered and routed.

== Background ==
British commander Lord Cornwallis had been unable to catch Nathanael Greene's army (in what historians now call the "Race to the Dan") as he strategically retreated to Dix's Ferry (present-day Danville, Virginia) using a screening feint column under Colonel Otho Williams, which allowed Greene to cross the Dan River at Irwin's (present-day Turbeville, Virginia) and Boyd's Ferry (present-day South Boston, Virginia) and out of North Carolina. Cornwallis, who had burned his baggage train at Ramsour's Mill near Lincolnton, North Carolina, had completely exhausted his men in pursuit of Greene, and the British forces were now starving in wet, freezing weather with little forage available. All the boats for crossing the Dan River were taken by Greene (Colonel Henry Lee III, in command of the rear guard cavalry, was the last to cross, approximately two hours before the British arrived) so that Cornwallis was stranded on the North Carolina side of the river. Cornwallis made an exhausting trip south, establishing a headquarters to regroup and recover at Hillsborough, North Carolina, a colonial outpost city, on February 21, where he also rallied Loyalists to his side.

Dr. John Pyle (1723–1804) had moved to Chatham County, North Carolina in 1767. Noted for his loyalty to the King, he had assisted the Governor in the War of the Regulation, though he was not at the Battle of Alamance in 1771. When Cornwallis appealed for Loyalist volunteers, Pyle gathered between 300 and 400 men. He requested Cornwallis provide his men with an escort, and Banastre Tarleton with his cavalry and a small force of infantry, a total of about 450 men, marched to lead Pyle to safety.

General Greene spent a week in Virginia, from February 15 to 22, where he was able to resupply, feed his troops, recover his wounded and gain reinforcements. On February 17 he detached Colonel Lee with his cavalry, and Colonel Andrew Pickens with Maryland infantry and South Carolina militia, to recross the Dan and monitor British activity. This force crossed the Dan on February 18 and set up a hidden camp along the road between the crossing points at Hillsborough and Haw River. From there Lee sent scouts to watch for British movements.

Word came the next morning that Tarleton was moving toward the Haw with an estimated 400 men. Lee and Pickens followed behind Tarleton, whom they learned had camped near the Haw. A planned attack was called off when scouts reported that Tarleton had again moved, after the militia companies he was expecting to meet did not show up. Pyle's force had delayed its movement (in violation of orders) to visit with family and friends before setting off.

At noon on February 24, Lee and Pickens captured two British staff officers and learned by interrogating them that Tarleton was only a few miles ahead. In the waning hours of the day, Lee's Legion, wearing short green jackets and plumed helmets, encountered two of Pyle's men, who mistook them for Tarleton's dragoons, who wore similar uniforms. Lee used this to his advantage and learned that Pyle's troops were nearby. Lee instructed Pickens' riflemen to flank Pyle's position, and then trotted into the camp in full salute. Lee exchanged customary civilities with Colonel Pyle and began shaking his hand when the sounds of battle commenced.

== Battle ==
The most commonly accepted account of the battle, pieced together from reports from Lee and Captain Joseph Graham, indicates that Lee's deception was purely chance, and that he had originally intended to avoid the Loyalists, intending instead to encounter Tarleton's Dragoons, the more important objective. The sounds of battle apparently commenced when the militia at the rear of Lee's Legion, recognizing the strips of red cloth on the hats of Pyle's men as the badge of Loyalists, alerted Captain Eggleston, who was new to the South and was not familiar with local Patriot and Loyalist badges. When he asked one of the Loyalists which side he was on, the man replied "King George", and Eggleston responded by striking him on the head with his sabre. Seeing this, Pickens' riflemen joined in the attack.

The cavalry line turned and also attacked the Loyalists. Pyle's men broke and ran, but many were either killed or wounded in the early exchanges. Many Loyalists, believing the attack to be a mistake, continued insisting they were on King George's side, to no avail. After ten minutes, the remaining Loyalists had fled, and at least 93 Loyalists were dead; certainly more were wounded and others were seen being carried off by friends. According to local legend, Pyle was badly wounded in the battle and crawled into a nearby pond where he concealed himself until he could be rescued. After recovering from his wounds, he surrendered to the local militia. Later they were pardoned because of Dr. Pyle's care for wounded patriots.

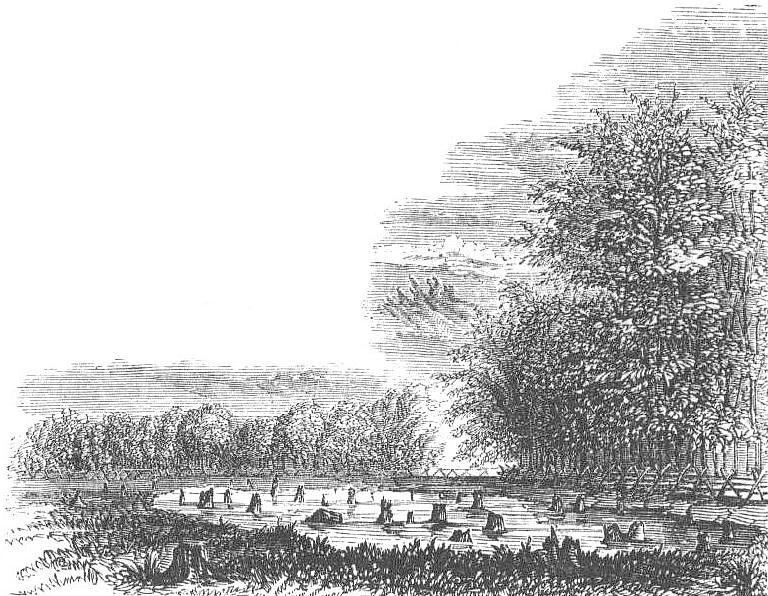
"Pyle's Pond" by Benson Lossing, 1852

== Aftermath ==
Pickens and Lee never caught up with Tarleton, since Cornwallis ordered him to rejoin the main army on the night of February 24. Though pursued, Tarleton eventually got too close to the main British army for Pickens and Lee to attack safely. Additionally, Nathanael Greene's recovered army crossed the Dan River back into North Carolina on February 22, proceeding for contact and action at the Battle of Guilford Court House on March 15, 1781. Lee and Pickens broke off to screen and join the campaign, their task being to demoralize and discourage Loyalist volunteers from adding to the diminishing British forces having been successful.

There were reports of atrocities committed by Catawba Indians in a late-arriving company, with claims that men were butchered after asking for quarter. The British were quick to denounce the Americans' actions as a massacre. Cornwallis, in a letter to Lord Sackville, reported that most of Pyle's force was "inhumanly butchered, when begging for quarters, without making the least resistance." Lee later argued in his memoir that if he had wanted to massacre the Loyalists he would have chased down the remnants of Pyle's company. Rather, he allowed them to run away and thereby put an end to Loyalist recruiting efforts in North Carolina.

The battle occurred a few weeks before the Battle of Guilford Court House and was a contributing factor in weakening British troop numbers and morale. As late as the 1850s, local residents could point out the location of the battle and the mass graves of those killed during the skirmish; at least one known mass grave has been recently relocated. The site is marked with periwinkle and cedar trees and at one time had a stone marker (placed in 1880), which has since been removed from the site; the marker's current location is unknown.

== See also ==
- List of massacres in North Carolina
