= Glen Raven, Inc. =

American fabric manufacturer

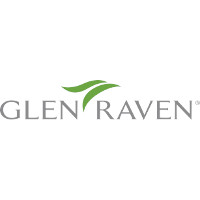
- Company type: Private
- Industry: Textiles
- Founded: Alamance, U.S. (1880)
- Headquarters: Glen Raven, North Carolina, U.S.
- Area served: Africa, Asia, Australia, Europe, North America
- Products: Aqualon Edge, Awning Composer, Causeway, Coastguard, Dickson, GlenGuard, HarborTime Edge, Hydrofend, Sleeve-It, Solair, Solamesh, StrataGrid, Sunbrella, Sunworker, Sur Last, Visilite
- Services: Third Party Logistics
- Subsidiaries: Dickson Constant, Glen Raven Asia, Glen Raven Material Solutions LLC, Glen Raven Consumer Solutions LLC, Glen Raven Logistics, Glen Raven Technical Fabrics LLC, Strata Systems Inc, Trivantage, LLC
- Website: https://www.glenraven.com/

Glen Raven, Inc. is a fabric manufacturing and marketing company. The company is headquartered in Glen Raven, North Carolina and headed by Leib Oehmig, who took over after Allen Erwin Gant, Jr., the grandson of John Quintin Gant and founder of the industry advocacy group National Council of Textile Organizations, retired. Glen Raven has operations in the United States, France, and China.

== History ==
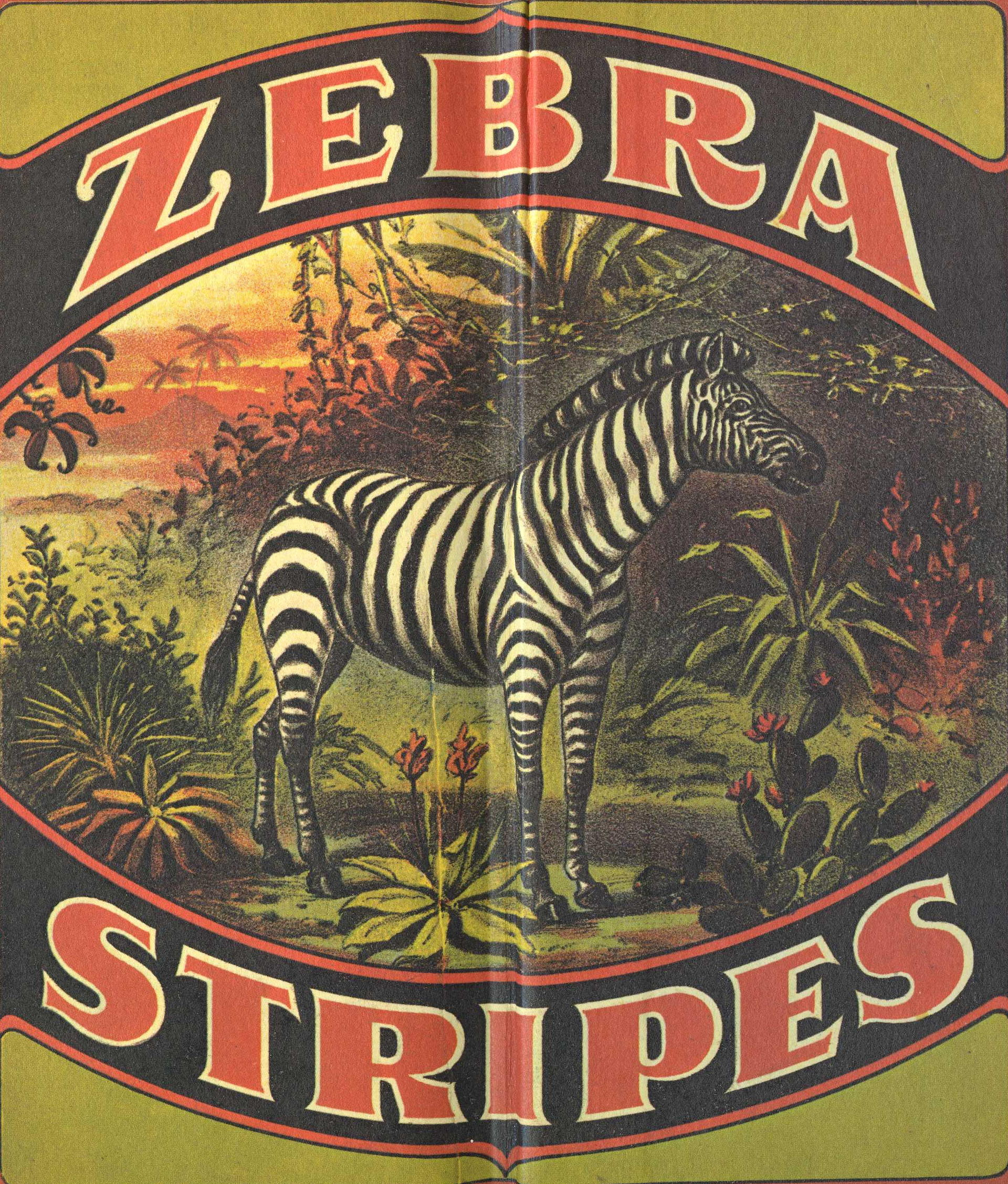
First trademark image of Zebra Stripes awning fabric, issued to Glen Raven Cotton Mills, 1908

John Quintin Gant entered the dry goods retail business in Company Shops, NC (Burlington) in 1872 and opened the John Q. Gant & Co. Gant sold his interest in the company in 1880 and then partnered with Berry Davidson to build the Altamahaw Cotton Mills in Alamance County, NC. The company was founded as John Q. Gant Manufacturing Co. in 1900 by John Quintin Gant (1847–1930), and by 1902, the company’s name was changed to Glen Raven Cotton Mills.

The company began manufacturing cotton duck awning fabrics in 1908 and developing pantyhose in 1953. Panti-Tights and Panti-Legs were introduced as the first commercial ladies pantyhose in 1959. In 1965, Glen Raven developed a seamless pantyhose that became popular due to the introduction of the miniskirt. Glen Raven exited the hosiery business in 1996. The company was also known for making duck cloth used in tents for World War I and making tent canvas, power bags, and parachute cloth for World War II.

Glen Raven claims to have woven the fabric used to make the first American flag that was planted on the moon at their weaving facility in Burnsville, NC. However, there is controversy and speculation whether the manufacturer of the fabric used in the American flag was made by Glen Raven or Burlington Industrial Fabrics. Glen Raven claims that they manufactured most of the nylon used in flags in the 1960s, while Burlington claims to have been the world’s largest textile company at the time. There is no clear documentation of where the flag was bought or who manufactured the fabric, and it still remains a mystery today.

The company introduced the use of yarns spun from pigmented acrylic-based fiber in 1961 with Sunbrella, which has vastly superior durability and light-fastness to cotton. Today, Sunbrella fabrics are used in a variety of applications including outdoor furniture, indoor furniture, boat covers, convertible automobile tops, and awnings. Glen Raven is best known for its Sunbrella line of performance fabrics.

In 1998 Glen Raven merged with Dickson SA of France, founded by David Dickson (1811–1869), a Scotsman and Officer of the Legion of Honour. The company started production in a new manufacturing facility in China on September 21, 2006.

In 2006, Sunbrella Awnings, Boat Tops, Canopies, and Umbrellas with Sun Protective Performance Fabrics UPF 50+ were awarded the "International Seal of Recommendation for UV Fabric/Umbrellas/Awnings" by The Skin Cancer Foundation, a worldwide organization dedicated to preventing skin cancer.

Glen Raven acquired the Astrup Company (founded in Cleveland, Ohio in 1876 by William J.O. Astrup) and John Boyle & Company (founded in Brooklyn, New York in 1860 by John Boyle) in 2007. Strata Systems, Inc. was acquired as part of the purchase of John Boyle & Company, which itself, had previously acquired Strata Systems, Inc. The combined Astrup and John Boyle companies were renamed Tri Vantage in March 2008. Tri Vantage was rebranded as Trivantage in November 2012 with the tagline "Order. Done. Good Call."

In October 2017, Glen Raven acquired Sunbury Textile Mills, one of their strategic business partners for over twenty years. Sunbury became a wholly owned subsidiary of Glen Raven and operated as part of Glen Raven Custom Fabrics, LLC.

== List of Subsidiaries ==
Information about Glen Raven Inc. Subsidiaries
Subsidiaries	Founded	Country	Logo	President	Website	Headquarters	Refs
Dickson Constant	1836	France	Dickson Constant Logo	David Swers	https://www.dickson-constant.com/en/	ZI la Pilaterie 10. rue des Châteaux - BP 109 F-59443 - Wasquehal, France	
Glen Raven Asia	2006	China	Glen Raven, Inc. Logo	David Swers	https://www.glenraven.com/	No. 8 Meiyi Street, East Su Hong Road, SIP Suzhou - Jiangsu Province 215026, China	
Glen Raven Material Solutions LLC	2023	United States	Glen Raven, Inc. Logo	David Swers	https://www.sunbrella.com	142 Glen Raven Road - Burlington, NC 27217-1100, USA	
Glen Raven Consumer Solutions LLC	2023	United States	Glen Raven, Inc. Logo	David Swers	https://www.sunbrella.com	142 Glen Raven Road - Burlington, NC 27217-1100, USA	
Glen Raven Logistics	1960	United States	Glen Raven Logistics Logo	Harold W. Hill, Jr.	https://www.glenravenlogistics.com/	3726 Altamahaw, Union Ridge Road - Altamahaw, NC 27202, USA	
Glen Raven Technical Fabrics LLC	1880	United States	Glen Raven, Inc. Logo	Harold W. Hill, Jr.	https://www.glenraven.com/	1831 North Park Avenue - Burlington, NC 27217-1100 - USA	
Strata Systems, Inc.	1990	United States	Strata Systems Inc Logo	Harold W. Hill, Jr.	https://www.geogrid.com/	1831 North Park Avenue - Burlington, NC 27217-1100, USA	
Trivantage, LLC	2008	United States	Trivantage, LLC Logo	Steve Ellington	https://www.trivantage.com/	1831 North Park Avenue - Burlington, NC 27217-1100, USA	

== List of Brands ==
Information about Brands owned by Glen Raven, Inc.
Brand	Owned by	Founded	Logo	Headquarters	Taglines	Ref
Sunbrella	Glen Raven, Inc.	1961	Sunbrella Logo	Sunbrella HQ, 142 Glen Raven Road - Burlington, NC 27217-1100 - USA	Give Life Texture	
Dickson	Glen Raven, Inc.	1998	Dickson Constant Logo	ZI la Pilaterie, 10. rue des Châteaux BP 109 - F-59443 Wasquehal, France	Innovative Textiles For Your World	
Trivantage	Glen Raven, Inc.	2008	Trivantage, LLC Logo	1831 North Park Avenue - Burlington, NC 27217-1100, USA	Order. Done. Good Call.	
GlenGuard	Glen Raven, Inc.	2004	GlenGuard Logo	1831 North Park Avenue - Burlington, NC 27217-1100, USA	Compliance	
Aqualon Edge	Glen Raven, Inc.	2016	Aqualon Edge Logo	1831 North Park Avenue - Burlington, NC 27217-1100, USA	-	
Awning Composer	Glen Raven, Inc.	1997	Awning Composer Logo	1831 North Park Avenue - Burlington, NC 27217-1100, USA	-	
Causeway	Glen Raven, Inc.	2019	Causeway Logo	1831 North Park Avenue - Burlington, NC 27217-1100, USA	-	
Hydrofend	Glen Raven, Inc.	2019	Hydrofend Logo	1831 North Park Avenue - Burlington, NC 27217-1100, USA	-	
Solair	Glen Raven, Inc.	2009	Solair Logo	1831 North Park Avenue - Burlington, NC 27217-1100, USA	-	
SolaMesh	Glen Raven, Inc.	2017	Solamesh Logo	1831 North Park Avenue - Burlington, NC 27217-1100, USA	-	
Visilite	Glen Raven, Inc.	2017	Visilite Logo	1831 North Park Avenue - Burlington, NC 27217-1100, USA	-	
