= Alamance County, North Carolina =

County in North Carolina, United States

- County
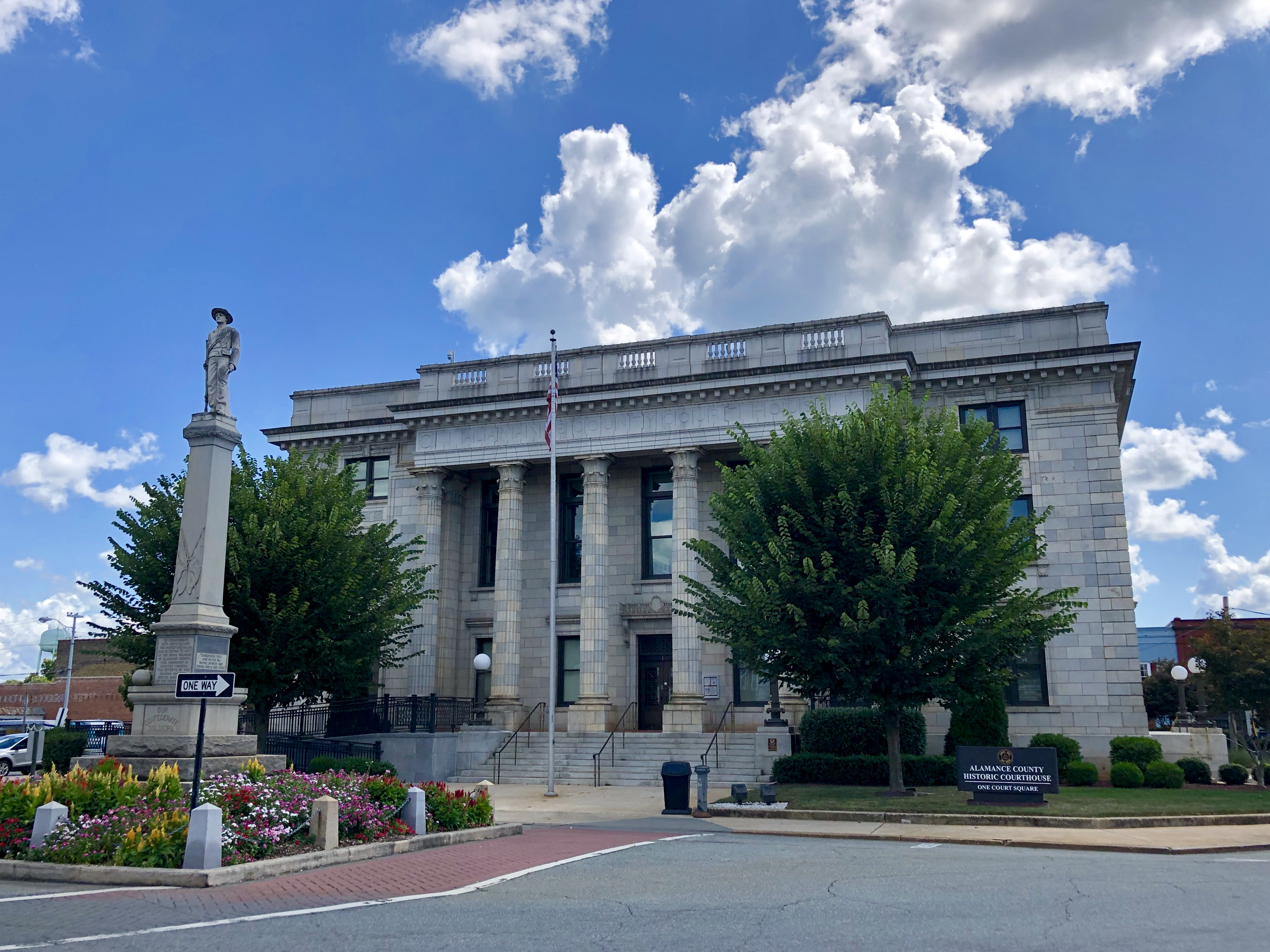
- Alamance County Courthouse and Confederate Monument

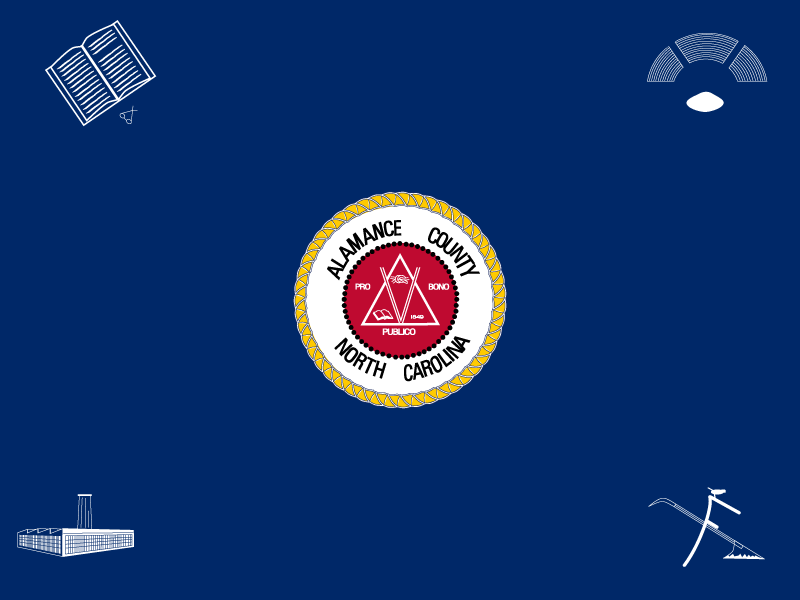
- Flag Seal
- Motto: "Pro Bono Publico" (Latin) (For the Public Good)
- Location within the U.S. state of North Carolina
- Interactive map of Alamance County, North Carolina
- Coordinates: 36.04°N 79.40°W
- Country: United States
- State: North Carolina
- Founded: 1849
- Named for: Native American word to describe the mud in Great Alamance Creek
- Seat: Graham
- Largest community: Burlington

Area
  - Total: 434.24 sq mi (1,124.7 km^{2})
  - Land: 423.45 sq mi (1,096.7 km^{2})
  - Water: 10.79 sq mi (27.9 km^{2}) 2.48%

Population (2020)
  - Total: 171,415
  - Estimate (2025): 186,177 ▲
  - Density: 404.81/sq mi (156.30/km^{2})
- Time zone: UTC−5 (Eastern)
  - Summer (DST): UTC−4 (EDT)
- Congressional district: 9th
- Website: www.alamance-nc.com

Alamance County (/ˈæləmæns/) is a county in North Carolina. As of the 2020 census, the population was 171,415. Its county seat is Graham. Formed in 1849 from Orange County to the east, Alamance County has been the site of significant historical events, textile manufacturing, and agriculture.

Alamance County comprises the Burlington, NC Metropolitan Statistical Area, which is also included in the Greensboro–Winston-Salem–High Point, NC Combined Statistical Area, which had an estimated population of 1,736,099 in 2026.

== History ==
Before being formed as a county, the region had at least one known small Southeastern tribe of Native Americans in the 18th century, the Sissipahaw, who lived in the area bounded by modern Saxapahaw, the area known as the Hawfields, and the Haw River. European settlers entered the region in the late 17th century chiefly following Native American trading paths, and set up their farms in what they called the "Haw Old Fields," fertile ground previously tilled by the Sissipahaw. The paths later became the basis of the railroad and interstate highway routes.

Alamance County was named after Great Alamance Creek, site of the Battle of Alamance (May 16, 1771), a pre-Revolutionary War battle in which militia under the command of Governor William Tryon crushed the Regulator movement. Great Alamance Creek, and in turn Little Alamance Creek, according to legend, were named after a local Native American word to describe the blue mud found at the bottom of the creeks. Other legends say the name came from another local Native American word meaning "noisy river," or for the Alamanni region of Rhineland, Germany, where many of the early settlers came from.

During the American Revolution, several small battles and skirmishes occurred in the area that became Alamance County, several of them during the lead-up to the Battle of Guilford Court House, including Pyle's Massacre, the Battle of Lindley's Mill, and the Battle of Clapp's Mill.

In the 1780s, the Occaneechi Native Americans returned to North Carolina from Virginia, this time settling in what is now Alamance County rather than their first location near Hillsborough. In 2002, the modern Occaneechi tribe bought 25 acres (100,000 m^{2}) of their ancestral land in Alamance County and began a Homeland Preservation Project that includes a village reconstructed as it would have been in 1701 and a 1930s farming village.

During the early 19th century, the textile industry grew heavily in the area, so the need for better transportation grew. By the 1840s, several mills were set up along the Haw River and near Great Alamance Creek and other major tributaries of the Haw. Between 1832 and 1880, at least 14 major mills were powered by these rivers and streams. Mills were built by the Trollinger, Holt, Newlin, Swepson, and Rosenthal families, among others. One of them, built in 1832 by Ben Trollinger, is still in operation. It is owned by Copland Industries, sits in the unincorporated community of Carolina and is the oldest continuously operating mill in North Carolina.

One notable textile produced in the area was the "Alamance plaids" or "Glencoe plaids" used in everything from clothing to tablecloths. The Alamance Plaids manufactured by textile pioneer Edwin M. Holt were the first colored cotton goods produced on power looms in the South, and paved the way for the region's textile boom. (Holt's home is now the Alamance County Historical Society.) But by the late 20th century, most of the plants and mills had gone out of business, including the mills operated by Burlington Industries, a company based in Burlington.

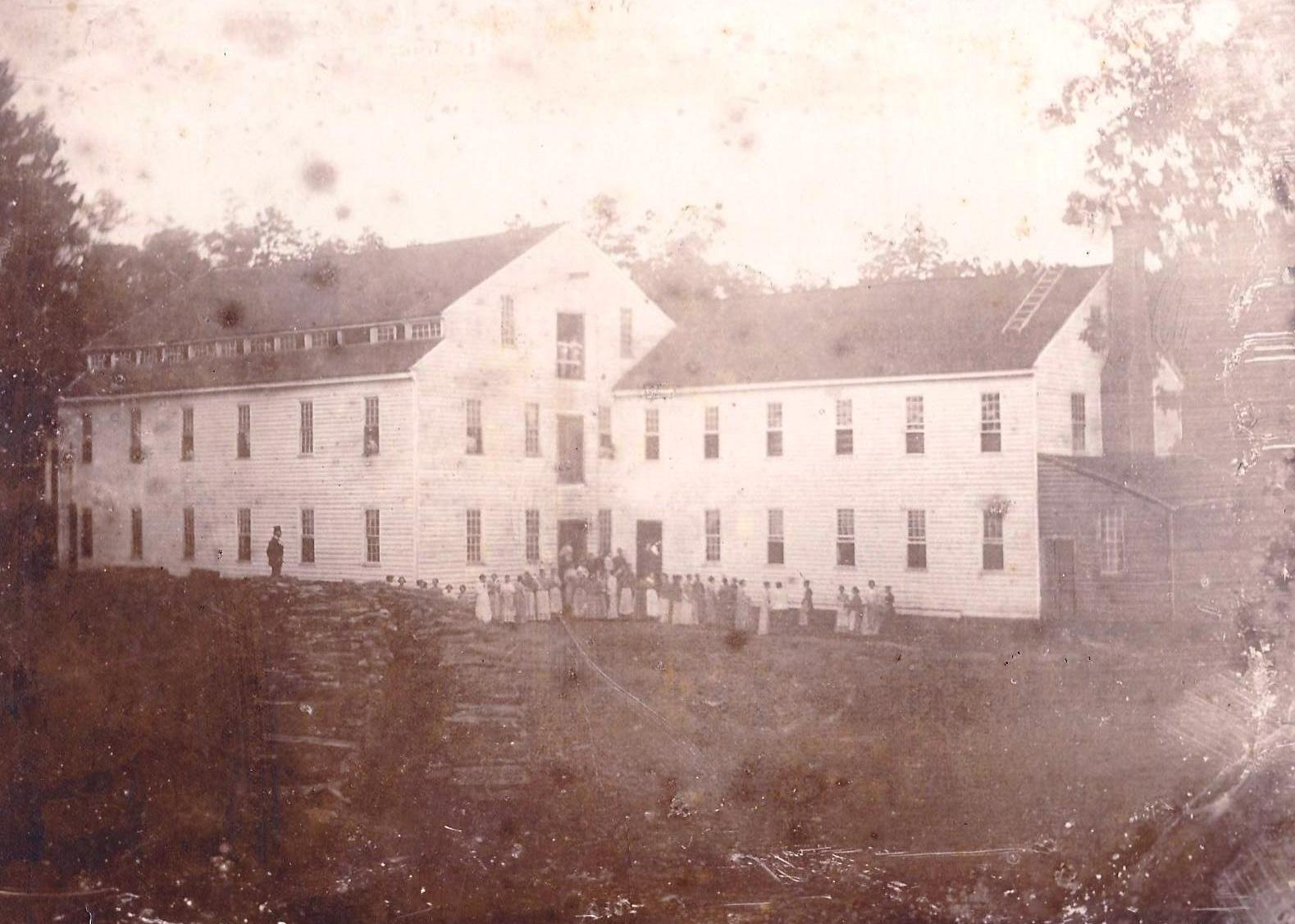
Alamance Cotton Factory, built by Edwin M. Holt. It was the first manufacturer of colored cotton fabrics in the South on power looms. Photograph taken in 1837

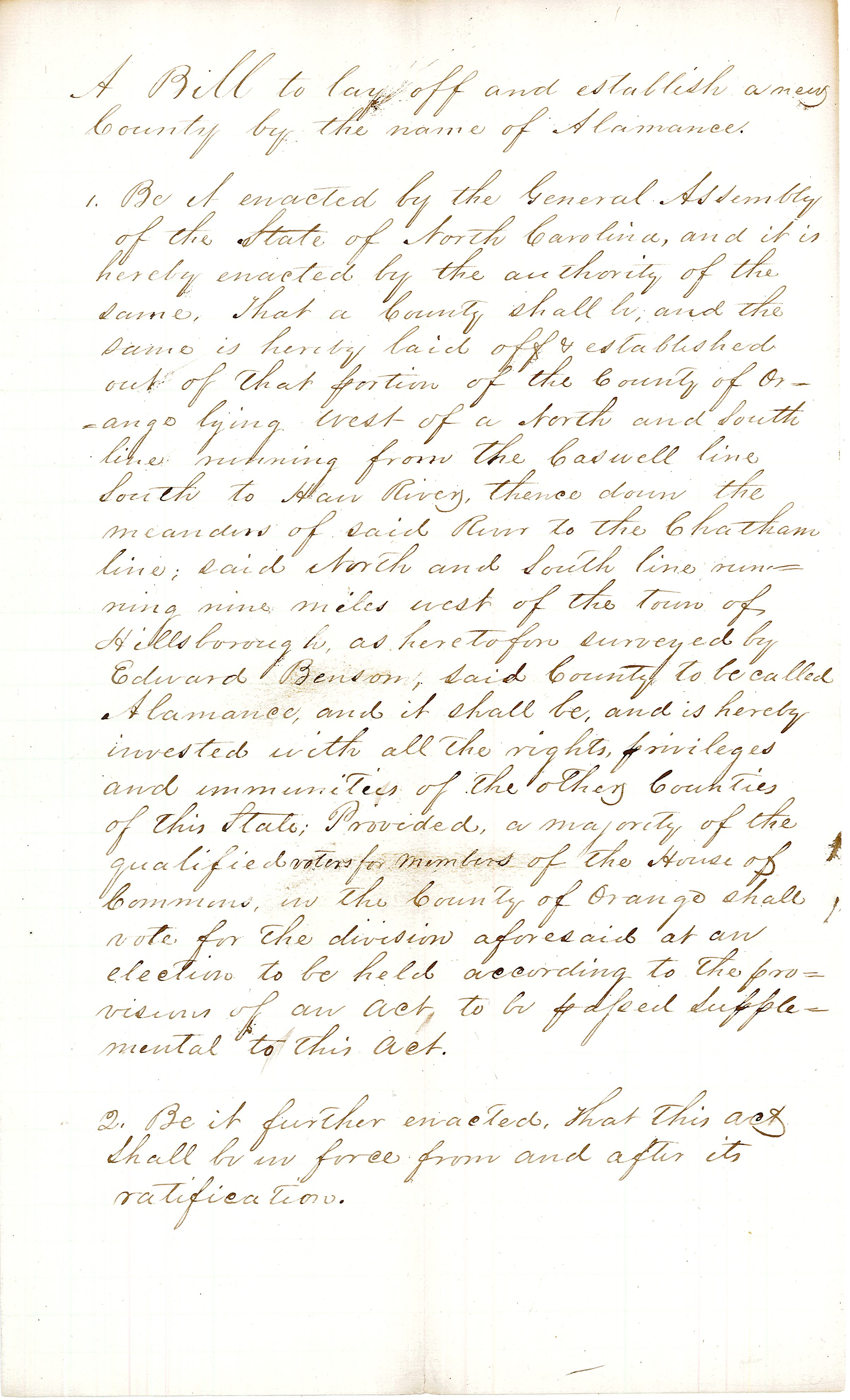
A bill establishing an Alamance County as presented and published to the North Carolina House of Commons, January 1, 1849.

By the 1840s, the textile industry was booming, and the railroad was being built through the area as a convenient link between Raleigh and Greensboro. Efforts to split a new county off from Orange County began in 1842. A bill to form the county from Orange County was filed by Giles Mebane on January 1, 1849 and passed the legislature later that month. An election was held on April 19, 1849 and the split was approved by the voters, with the new county being established officially on April 24 by Governor Charles Manly.

=== Civil War ===
In March 1861, Alamance County residents voted overwhelmingly against North Carolina's secession from the Union, 1,114 to 254. Two delegates were sent to the State Secession Convention, Thomas Ruffin and Giles Mebane, who both opposed secession, as did most of the delegates sent to the convention. At the time of the convention, around 30% of Alamance County's population were slaves (total population around 12,000, including roughly 3,500 slaves and 500 free Black people).

North Carolina was reluctant to join other Southern states in secession until the Battle of Fort Sumter in April 1861. When Lincoln called up troops, Governor John Ellis replied, "I can be no party to this wicked violation of the laws of the country and to this war upon the liberties of a free people. You can get no troops from North Carolina." After a special legislative session, North Carolina's legislature unanimously voted for secession on May 20, 1861.

No battles took place in Alamance County, but it sent its share of soldiers to the front lines. In July 1861, for the first time in American history, soldiers were sent in to combat by rail. The 6th North Carolina was loaded onto railroad cars at Company Shops and transferred to the battlefront at Manassas, Virginia (First Battle of Manassas).

Although the citizens of Alamance County were not directly affected throughout much of the war, in April 1865, they witnessed firsthand their sons and fathers marching through the county just days before the war ended with the surrender at Bennett Place near Durham. At Company Shops, General Joseph E. Johnston stopped to say farewell to his soldiers for the last time. By the end of the war, 236 people from Alamance County had been killed in the course of the war, more than any other war since the county's founding.

=== Kirk–Holden War ===
Some of the Civil War's most significant effects were seen after it ended. Alamance County briefly became a center of national attention when in 1870 Wyatt Outlaw, an African-American town commissioner in Graham, was lynched by the Ku Klux Klan. He was president of the Alamance County Union League of America (a progressive reform branch of the Federal Government), helped to establish the Republican party in North Carolina, and advocated establishing a school for African Americans. His offense was that Governor William Holden had appointed him a justice of the peace, and he had accepted the appointment. Outlaw's body was found hanging 30 yards from the courthouse, with a note pinned to his chest reading, "Beware! You guilty parties – both white and black." Outlaw was the central figure in political cooperation between blacks and whites in the county.

On July 8, 1870, Governor Holden declared Caswell County to be in a state of insurrection and sent North Carolina militiamen to Caswell and Alamance Counties, under the command of Union veteran George W. Kirk, beginning the so-called Kirk–Holden war. Kirk's troops ultimately arrested 82 men.

The Grand Jury of Alamance County indicted 63 klansmen for felonies and 18 for the murder of Wyatt Outlaw. Soon after the indictments were brought, Democrats in the legislature passed a bill to repeal the law under which the indictments had been secured. The 63 felony charges were dropped. The Democratic Party then used a national program of "Amnesty and Pardon" to proclaim amnesty for all who committed crimes on behalf of a secret society. This was extended to the klansmen of Alamance County. There would be no justice in the case of Wyatt Outlaw.

Holden's support for Reconstruction led to his impeachment and removal by the North Carolina Legislature in 1871.

=== Dairy industry ===
The county was once the state leader in dairy production. Several dairies including Melville Dairy in Burlington were headquartered in the county. With increasing real estate prices and a slump in milk prices, most dairy farms have been sold and many of them developed for real estate purposes.

=== World War II and the Cold War ===
During World War II, Fairchild Aircraft built airplanes at a plant on the eastern side of Burlington. Among the planes built there was the AT-21 gunner, used to train bomber pilots. Near the Fairchild plant was the Western Electric Burlington works. During the Cold War, the plant built radar equipment and guidance systems for missiles and many other electronics for the government, including the guidance system for the Titan missile. The plant closed in 1992 and sat abandoned until 2005, when it was purchased by a local businessman for manufacturing.

The USS Alamance, a Tolland-class attack cargo ship, was built during and served in and after World War II.

=== 21st century ===
Alamance County's population has grown significantly, with the city of Mebane tripling in size between 1990 and 2020. The county has seen significant business and industry growth, including the additions of the North Carolina Commerce Park and the North Carolina Industrial Center, as well as new retail opportunities near Interstates 85 and 40 on the eastern (Tanger Outlets) and western (University Commons and Alamance Crossing) sides of the county.

Some growth has been attributed to illegal immigration, which has led to ongoing legal issues. In 2012, the Department of Justice found the Alamance County Sheriff's Office to use discriminatory policing, however the case was dismissed by U.S. District Court Judge Thomas D. Schroeder, finding that the government failed to demonstrate that the ACSO had engaged in discriminatory policing.

Beginning in 2014, the county has been home to a number of political demonstrations. In October 2020, during a demonstration prior to the 2020 United States presidential election, Alamance County sheriff's deputies and Graham police used pepper spray against crowd members. Law enforcement reported that pepper spray had been deployed to disperse the crowd following an assault on an officer who was trying to shut down a generator the march organizers had brought, in violation of a signed agreement.

== Geography ==
According to the U.S. Census Bureau, the county has a total area of 434.24 square miles (1,124.7 km^{2}), of which 423.45 square miles (1,096.7 km^{2}) is land and 10.79 square miles (27.9 km^{2}) (2.48%) is water.

The county is in the Piedmont physiographical region. It has a general rolling terrain with the Cane Creek Mountains rising to over 970 ft (300 m) in the south-central part of the county just north of Snow Camp. Bass Mountain, one of the prominent hills in the range, is home to a world-renowned bluegrass music festival every year. Also, isolated monadnocks are in the northern part of the county that rise to near or over 900 ft (270 m) above sea level.

The largest river that flows through Alamance County is the Haw, which feeds into Jordan Lake in Chatham County, eventually leading to the Cape Fear River. The county is also home to numerous creeks, streams, and ponds, including Great Alamance Creek, where a portion of the Battle of Alamance was fought. The three large municipal reservoirs are: Lake Cammack, Lake Mackintosh, and Graham-Mebane Lake (formerly Quaker Lake). The southwest end of the county is drained by North Rocky River Prong and Greenbrier Creek, two tributaries of the Rocky River in the Deep River system.

=== State and local protected areas/sites ===
- Alamance Battleground State Historic Site
- Bass Mountain Summit
- Burlington Downtown Depot
- Cane Creek Mountains Natural Area
- Cedarock Park
- Graham Regional Park
- Lake Cammack Park & Marina
- Shallow Ford Natural Area
- The Valley Golf Course

=== Major water bodies ===
- Great Alamance Creek
- Cane Creek (Haw River tributary, left bank)
- Cane Creek (Haw River tributary, right bank)
- Haw River
- Lake Cammack
- Lake Mackintosh
- Little Alamance Creek
- Poppaw Creek
- Quaker Creek Reservoir
- Sellers Manufacturing Company Lake
- Stagg Creek

=== Adjacent counties ===
- Caswell County – north
- Orange County – east
- Chatham County – south-southeast
- Randolph County – southwest
- Guilford County – west
- Rockingham County – northwest

=== Major highways ===
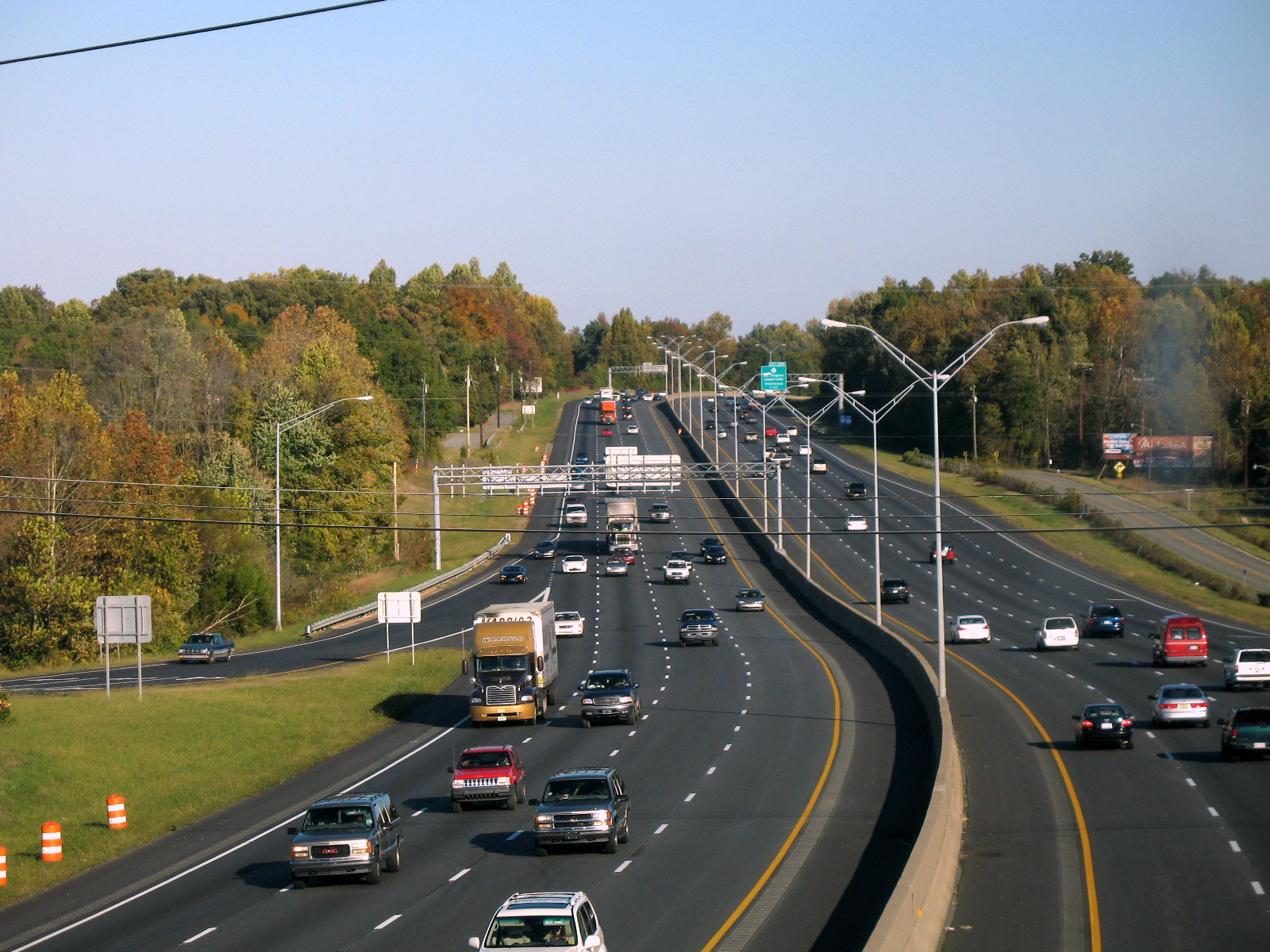
Interstates 85 and 40 run concurrently as seen from Exit 141 in Burlington, facing east. The Interstates run east to west through the central part of the county.

- I-40 / I-85 (concurrent) also known as the Sam Hunt Freeway, named after a former North Carolina Secretary of Transportation. Interstates 85/40 run east-to-west through the central part of the county, extending to Hillsborough and Greensboro, respectively.
- US 70 nearly parallels 85/40 a few miles north of the interstates as it passes through the downtown sections of Burlington, Haw River, and Mebane.
- NC 49 runs southwest to northeast from the Liberty area (Randolph County), through Burlington, Graham, and Haw River, to the Pleasant Grove Community area, before turning northeast and continuing into Orange County.
- NC 54 runs from its northwestern end at its intersection with U.S. Highway 70 in Burlington southeast to the Orange County line in the southeast part of the county.
- NC 62 runs southwest to northeast entering from Guilford County into Kimesville, then through Burlington, to Pleasant Grove. It then turns north and heads to Caswell County.
- NC 87 serves as the main north–south route through the county. It enters from the south at the Chatham County line into Eli Whitney, then through the major cities of Graham and Burlington, and a small part of Elon, before continuing north and heading through the Altamahaw-Ossipee area, finally moving into Caswell and Rockingham Counties.
- NC 100 forms a loop through downtown Burlington, starting at the intersection of Maple Avenue and Chapel Hill Road before moving north, then northwest, then going through Elon and moving on to Gibsonville and Guilford County.
- NC 119 runs roughly north from its southern terminus at an intersection with N.C. Highway 54, moving through Mebane and heading north into Caswell County.

=== Major infrastructure ===
- Burlington–Alamance Regional Airport
- Burlington Station

== Demographics ==
Historical population
| Census | Pop. | Note | %± |
|---|---|---|---|
| 1850 | 11,444 | | — |
| 1860 | 11,852 | | 3.6% |
| 1870 | 11,874 | | 0.2% |
| 1880 | 14,613 | | 23.1% |
| 1890 | 18,271 | | 25.0% |
| 1900 | 25,665 | | 40.5% |
| 1910 | 28,712 | | 11.9% |
| 1920 | 32,718 | | 14.0% |
| 1930 | 42,140 | | 28.8% |
| 1940 | 57,427 | | 36.3% |
| 1950 | 71,220 | | 24.0% |
| 1960 | 85,674 | | 20.3% |
| 1970 | 96,362 | | 12.5% |
| 1980 | 99,319 | | 3.1% |
| 1990 | 108,213 | | 9.0% |
| 2000 | 130,800 | | 20.9% |
| 2010 | 151,131 | | 15.5% |
| 2020 | 171,415 | | 13.4% |
| 2025 (est.) | 186,177 | ▲ | 8.6% |
U.S. Decennial Census; 1790–1960 1900–1990; 1990–2000 2010 2020

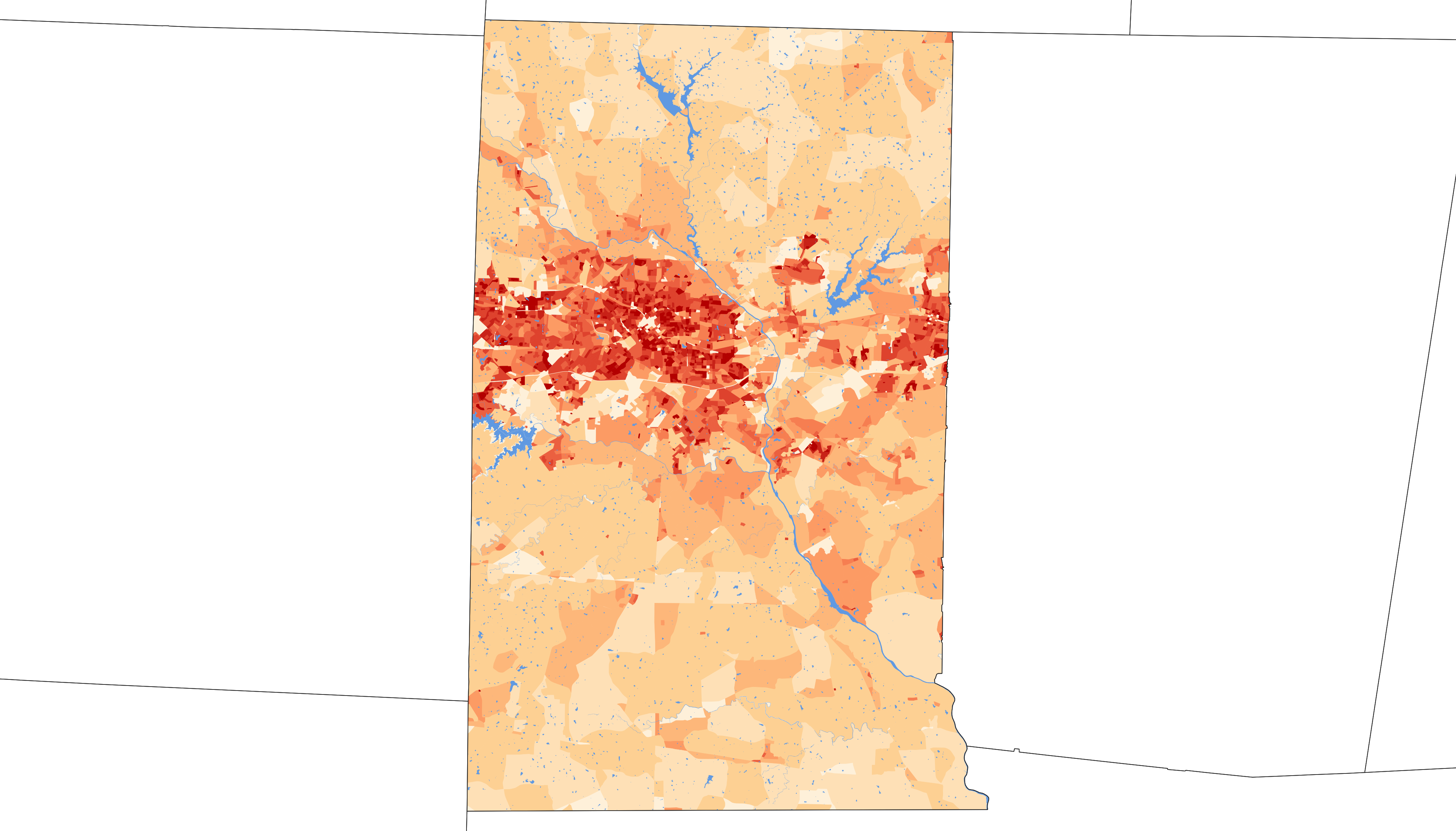
2020 population density of Alamance County NC by census block

=== 2020 census ===
Alamance County, North Carolina – Racial and ethnic composition Note: the US Census treats Hispanic/Latino as an ethnic category. This table excludes Latinos from the racial categories and assigns them to a separate category. Hispanics/Latinos may be of any race.
| Race / Ethnicity (NH = Non-Hispanic) | Pop 1980 | Pop 1990 | Pop 2000 | Pop 2010 | Pop 2020 | % 1980 | % 1990 | % 2000 | % 2010 | % 2020 |
|---|---|---|---|---|---|---|---|---|---|---|
| White alone (NH) | 79,418 | 85,913 | 94,768 | 101,718 | 102,487 | 79.96% | 79.39% | 72.45% | 67.30% | 59.79% |
| Black or African American alone (NH) | 18,950 | 20,763 | 24,356 | 27,985 | 33,555 | 19.08% | 19.19% | 18.62% | 18.52% | 19.58% |
| Native American or Alaska Native alone (NH) | 144 | 296 | 388 | 542 | 584 | 0.14% | 0.27% | 0.30% | 0.36% | 0.34% |
| Asian alone (NH) | 160 | 482 | 1,154 | 1,806 | 2,811 | 0.16% | 0.45% | 0.88% | 1.19% | 1.64% |
| Native Hawaiian or Pacific Islander alone (NH) | x | x | 13 | 55 | 86 | x | x | 0.01% | 0.04% | 0.05% |
| Other race alone (NH) | 66 | 23 | 131 | 211 | 762 | 0.07% | 0.02% | 0.10% | 0.14% | 0.44% |
| Mixed race or Multiracial (NH) | x | x | 1,155 | 2,175 | 6,427 | x | x | 0.88% | 1.44% | 3.75% |
| Hispanic or Latino (any race) | 581 | 736 | 8,835 | 16,639 | 24,703 | 0.58% | 0.68% | 6.75% | 11.01% | 14.41% |
| Total | 99,319 | 108,213 | 130,800 | 151,131 | 171,415 | 100.00% | 100.00% | 100.00% | 100.00% | 100.00% |

As of the 2020 census, there were 171,415 people, 67,925 households, and 41,793 families residing in the county. The median age was 39.3 years.

21.8% of residents were under the age of 18 and 17.4% were 65 years of age or older; for every 100 females there were 90.1 males, and for every 100 females age 18 and over there were 86.5 males.

The racial makeup of the county was 61.7% White, 19.8% Black or African American, 0.8% American Indian and Alaska Native, 1.7% Asian, 0.1% Native Hawaiian and Pacific Islander, 9.0% from some other race, and 6.8% from two or more races. Hispanic or Latino residents of any race comprised 14.4% of the population.

73.6% of residents lived in urban areas, while 26.4% lived in rural areas.

There were 67,925 households in the county, of which 30.2% had children under the age of 18 living in them. Of all households, 44.1% were married-couple households, 17.9% were households with a male householder and no spouse or partner present, and 31.6% were households with a female householder and no spouse or partner present. About 29.3% of all households were made up of individuals and 12.6% had someone living alone who was 65 years of age or older.

There were 73,385 housing units, of which 7.4% were vacant. Among occupied housing units, 64.9% were owner-occupied and 35.1% were renter-occupied. The homeowner vacancy rate was 1.6% and the rental vacancy rate was 6.9%.

=== 2010 census ===
At the 2010 census, there were 151,131 people, 59,960 households, and 39,848 families residing in the county. The population density was 347.4 people per square mile (134.1 people/km^{2}). There were 66,055 housing units at an average density of 151.9 units per square mile (58.6 units/km^{2}). The racial makeup of the county was 71.1% White, 18.8% Black or African American, 0.7% Native American, 1.2% Asian, 0.02% Pacific Islander, 6.1% from other races, and 2.1% from two or more races. 11% of the population were Hispanic or Latino of any race.

There were 59,960 households, out of which 29.2% had children under the age of 18 living with them, 47.2% were married couples living together, 14.5% had a female householder with no husband present, and 33.5% were non-families. 27.8% of all households were made up of individuals, and 26.6% had someone living alone who was 65 years of age or older. The average household size was 2.45 and the average family size was 2.98.

In the county, the population was spread out, with 26.7% under the age of 19, 7.2% from 20 to 24, 25.1% from 25 to 44, 26.3% from 45 to 64, and 14.5% who were 65 years of age or older. The median age was 38.7 years. For every 100 females there were 92.50 males. For every 100 females age 18 and over, there were 89.00 males.

The median income for a household in the county was $44,430, and the median income for a family was $54,605. Males had a median income of $31,906 versus $23,367 for females. The per capita income for the county was $23,477. About 13.7% of families and 16.1% of the population were below the poverty line, including 25% of those under age 18 and 8.7% of those age 65 or over.

== Government and politics ==
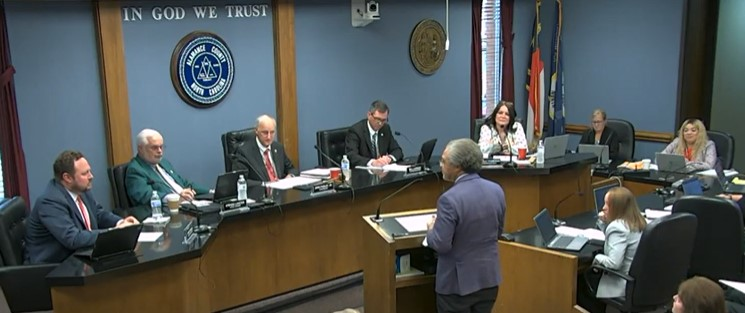
Alamance County Board of Commissioners meeting in 2022

Lying between overwhelmingly liberal and Democratic Orange County and Durham County to the east, equally Democratic Guilford County to the west, and heavily conservative and Republican Randolph County to the southwest, Alamance leans Republican, though not as overwhelmingly as many other suburban counties in the Piedmont Triad. The last Democratic nominee for president to carry Alamance County was Jimmy Carter in 1976.

Despite this, Democrat Josh Stein won the county in the 2024 North Carolina gubernatorial election. Democratic presidential nominee Kamala Harris also won 45.2% of the vote in the county, the highest percentage since 1976.

Alamance County is a member of the regional Piedmont Triad Council of Governments. The county is led by the Alamance County Board of Commissioners and the County Manager, who is appointed by the Board of Commissioners. County residents also elect two other county government offices: the Sheriff and Register of Deeds.

Alamance County has provided North Carolina with three governors and two U.S. senators: Governor Thomas Holt, Governor and Senator Kerr Scott, Governor Robert W. (Bob) Scott (Kerr Scott's son), and Senator B. Everett Jordan.

United States presidential election results for Alamance County, North Carolina
| Year | Republican | | Democratic | | Third party(ies) | |
| Year | No. | % | No. | % | No. | % |
|---|---|---|---|---|---|---|
| 1880 | 1,247 | 45.44% | 1,463 | 53.32% | 34 | 1.24% |
| 1884 | 1,259 | 43.65% | 1,607 | 55.72% | 18 | 0.62% |
| 1888 | 1,544 | 45.31% | 1,716 | 50.35% | 148 | 4.34% |
| 1892 | 1,301 | 37.71% | 1,691 | 49.01% | 458 | 13.28% |
| 1896 | 2,314 | 49.59% | 2,302 | 49.34% | 50 | 1.07% |
| 1900 | 2,256 | 53.50% | 1,923 | 45.60% | 38 | 0.90% |
| 1904 | 1,770 | 48.11% | 1,907 | 51.83% | 2 | 0.05% |
| 1908 | 2,184 | 50.43% | 2,113 | 48.79% | 34 | 0.79% |
| 1912 | 150 | 3.82% | 2,132 | 54.26% | 1,647 | 41.92% |
| 1916 | 2,278 | 47.87% | 2,476 | 52.03% | 5 | 0.11% |
| 1920 | 4,619 | 46.78% | 5,255 | 53.22% | 0 | 0.00% |
| 1924 | 3,217 | 39.38% | 4,859 | 59.48% | 93 | 1.14% |
| 1928 | 6,810 | 61.52% | 4,260 | 38.48% | 0 | 0.00% |
| 1932 | 4,478 | 34.76% | 8,240 | 63.97% | 164 | 1.27% |
| 1936 | 3,847 | 25.87% | 11,025 | 74.13% | 0 | 0.00% |
| 1940 | 3,382 | 22.83% | 11,429 | 77.17% | 0 | 0.00% |
| 1944 | 4,976 | 35.14% | 9,184 | 64.86% | 0 | 0.00% |
| 1948 | 5,124 | 33.32% | 8,287 | 53.88% | 1,969 | 12.80% |
| 1952 | 11,388 | 45.94% | 13,402 | 54.06% | 0 | 0.00% |
| 1956 | 12,123 | 52.36% | 11,029 | 47.64% | 0 | 0.00% |
| 1960 | 14,818 | 52.14% | 13,599 | 47.86% | 0 | 0.00% |
| 1964 | 15,177 | 49.64% | 15,397 | 50.36% | 0 | 0.00% |
| 1968 | 12,310 | 36.54% | 8,241 | 24.46% | 13,139 | 39.00% |
| 1972 | 22,046 | 74.61% | 6,833 | 23.12% | 670 | 2.27% |
| 1976 | 12,680 | 41.94% | 17,371 | 57.46% | 180 | 0.60% |
| 1980 | 18,077 | 53.06% | 15,042 | 44.16% | 947 | 2.78% |
| 1984 | 26,063 | 69.74% | 11,230 | 30.05% | 77 | 0.21% |
| 1988 | 24,131 | 65.48% | 12,642 | 34.31% | 78 | 0.21% |
| 1992 | 20,637 | 48.33% | 15,521 | 36.35% | 6,543 | 15.32% |
| 1996 | 22,461 | 53.66% | 15,814 | 37.78% | 3,586 | 8.57% |
| 2000 | 29,305 | 62.23% | 17,459 | 37.08% | 327 | 0.69% |
| 2004 | 33,302 | 61.47% | 20,686 | 38.18% | 187 | 0.35% |
| 2008 | 34,859 | 54.17% | 28,918 | 44.94% | 576 | 0.90% |
| 2012 | 38,170 | 56.32% | 28,875 | 42.60% | 731 | 1.08% |
| 2016 | 38,815 | 54.55% | 29,833 | 41.93% | 2,509 | 3.53% |
| 2020 | 46,056 | 53.50% | 38,825 | 45.10% | 1,210 | 1.41% |
| 2024 | 47,937 | 53.36% | 40,624 | 45.22% | 1,270 | 1.41% |

Elected officials of Alamance County as of 2026
| Official | Position | Term ends |
County Commissioners
| Kelly Allen | Chair | 2026 |
| Steve Carter | Vice-chair | 2026 |
| Ed Priola | Commissioner | 2028 |
| Pamela T. Thompson | Commissioner | 2028 |
| John P. Paisley | Commissioner | 2028 |
Other County-Wide Offices
| Shannon Long | Sheriff | 2026 |
| David Barber | Register of Deeds | 2028 |

=== County manager ===
Alamance County adopted the council-manager form of government in the 1970s, where the day-to-day management of county business is done by an individual hired by the commissioners' board. Since the establishment of the office, the following persons have served as county managers:

==== Current manager ====
Heidi York (July 2022–present)

==== Past managers ====
- Bryan Hagood (March 2017–March 2022)
- Craig Honeycutt (April 2009–March 2017)
- David I. Smith (August 2005–December 2008)
- David S. Cheek (July 1998–June 2005)
- Robert C. Smith
- Hal Larry Scott
- D.J. Walker

D.J. Walker and David Smith held dual roles as county manager and county attorney during their terms.

=== Sheriff ===
Shannon Long was elected in 2026, replacing Terry Johnson who served as sheriff since 2002. In 2016, Johnson settled a lawsuit from the Department of Justice that alleged bias in policing, with federal investigators finding that the sheriff’s office targeted Latino neighborhoods for traffic enforcement and that Latino drivers in the county were four to 10 times more likely to be stopped.

== Arts and recreation ==
=== The arts ===
The Paramount Theater serves as a center of dramatic presentations in the community. To the south there is the Snow Camp Outdoor Drama which has plays from late spring to early fall in the evenings. Alamance County is also home to the Haw River Ballroom, a large music and arts venue in Saxapahaw.

=== Parks ===
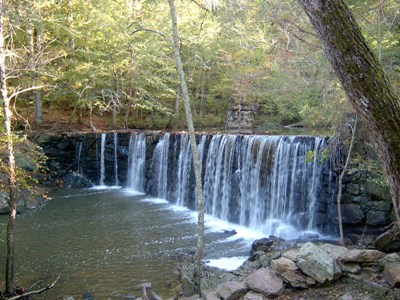
Old Dam at Cedarock Park

Alamance County, Burlington, Graham, Elon, Haw River, Swepsonville, and Mebane all have small parks that are not listed here. Major parks include:

- Cedarock Park, located 6 miles (10 km) south of the intersection of Interstate 85/40 and NC Highway 49. The park is home to the Cedarock Historic Farm, an old mill dam, and three disc golf courses.
- Great Bend Park at Glencoe, located 4 miles (6 km) north of the intersection of US Highway 70, and NC Highways 87, 62, and 100 in downtown Burlington. Great Bend Park contains parts of the Haw River Land and Paddle Trails and the Mountains-to-Sea Trail, the Textile Heritage Museum, along with picnicking, fishing, and other opportunities. The park was built around the site of the Glencoe Mills, an area that is currently under renovation with an old mill that has been listed on the National Register of Historic Places.

=== Sports ===
==== Professional ====
The Burlington Sock Puppets, members of the Appalachian League, a wood-bat collegiate summer league, play their home games at Burlington Athletic Stadium in Fairchild Park. They were previously known as the Burlington Royals from 2007 to 2020. The Royals were rebranded as the Sock Puppets following the contraction and reorganization of minor league baseball prior to the 2021 season. 2021 was the inaugural season for the revamped Appalachian League and the Sock Puppets. Prior to being known as the Royals, the team was also known as the Burlington Indians from 1986 to 2006. This version of the team has been active since 1985, but Burlington hosted a minor league baseball team for many years under the Burlington Indians and Burlington Bees.

==== Collegiate ====
The Elon University Phoenix play in the town of Elon. The Phoenix compete in the NCAA's Division I (Championship Subdivision in football) Colonial Athletic Association. Intercollegiate sports include baseball, basketball, cross-country, football, golf, soccer, and tennis for men, and basketball, cross-country, golf, indoor track, outdoor track, soccer, softball, tennis, and volleyball for women.

== Economy ==
Today, Alamance County is often described as a "bedroom" community, with many residents living in the county and working elsewhere due to low tax rates, although the county is still a major player in the textile and manufacturing industries. The current county-wide tax rate for Alamance County residents is 58.0 cents per $100 valuation. This does not include tax rates imposed by municipalities or fire districts.

The top employers in Alamance County are:

| Company | City | Location type | Employees |
|---|---|---|---|
| Alamance-Burlington School System | Burlington | HQ | 3,329 |
| Laboratory Corp of America | Burlington | HQ | 3,200 |
| Alamance Regional Medical Center | Burlington | Branch | 2,240 |
| Elon University | Elon | Main Campus | 1,403 |
| Walmart | Burlington | Branch | 1,000 |
| Alamance County | Graham | HQ | 956 |
| City of Burlington | Burlington | HQ | 806 |
| Alamance Community College | Graham | HQ | 652 |
| Honda Power Equipment Mfg | Swepsonville | HQ | 600 |
| GKN Driveline North America | Mebane | Branch | 500 |
| Glen Raven, Inc. | Altamahaw | Branch | 500 |

== Education ==
Alamance County is served by the Alamance-Burlington School System, several private elementary and secondary schools, Alamance Community College, and Elon University.

== Communities ==
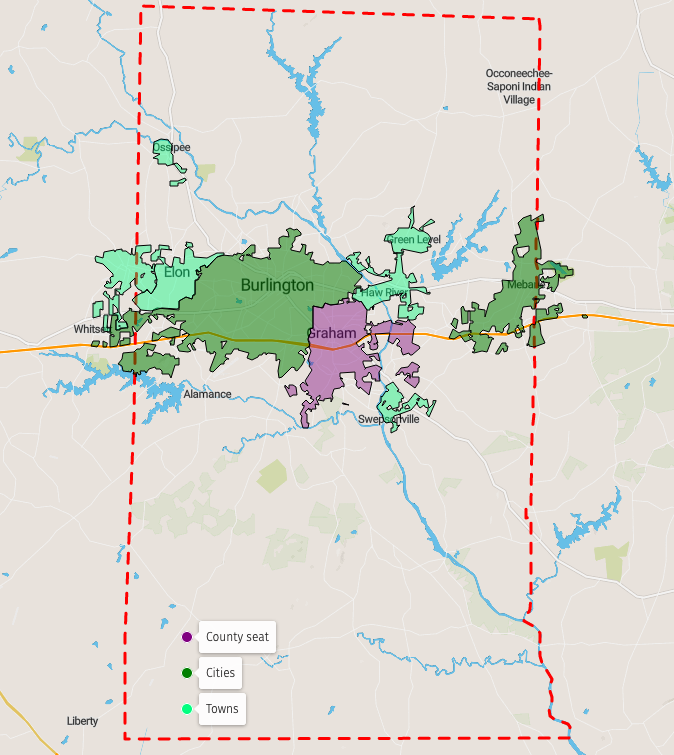
Clickable map of Alamance County

=== Cities ===
- Burlington (largest community)
- Graham (county seat)
- Mebane (mostly)

=== Towns ===
- Elon
- Gibsonville (small part)
- Green Level
- Haw River
- Ossipee
- Swepsonville

=== Village ===
- Alamance

=== Townships ===
The county is divided into thirteen townships, which are both numbered and named.

- 1 (Patterson)
- 2 (Coble)
- 3 (Boone Station)
- 4 (Morton)
- 5 (Faucette)
- 6 (Graham)
- 7 (Albright)
- 8 (Newlin)
- 9 (Thompson)
- 10 (Melville)
- 11 (Pleasant Grove)
- 12 (Burlington)
- 13 (Haw River)

=== Census-designated places ===
- Altamahaw
- Glen Raven
- Saxapahaw
- Woodlawn

=== Unincorporated communities ===
- Bellemont
- Carolina
- Dogwood Acres
- Eli Whitney
- Glencoe
- Hawfields
- Kimesville (also in Guilford County)
- Mandale
- Mount Hermon
- Pleasant Grove
- Snow Camp

=== Ghost towns ===
According to a 1975 study of the history of post offices in North Carolina by Treasure Index, Alamance County has 27 ghost towns that existed in the 18th and 19th centuries. Additionally, five other post offices no longer exist. These towns and their post offices were either abandoned as organized settlements or absorbed into the larger communities that now make up Alamance County.

- Albright, site located approximately 1-mile (1.6 km) south of exit 153 on Interstate 40
- Carney, Near the site of Cedarock Park
- Cane Creek
- Cedarcliff, between Swepsonville and Saxapahaw
- Clover Orchard, approximately 2 miles (3.2 km) northeast of Snow Camp
- Curtis (Curtis Mills), approximately 1/2 mile (0.80 km) southeast of the village of Alamance
- Glenddale, approximately 3 miles (4.8 km) north of Pleasant Grove near the Alamance-Caswell county line
- Hartshorn, about 1 1/2 miles (2.4 km) south-southeast of the Alamance Battleground Historic Site
- Holmans Mills, approximately 1-mile (1.6 km) east of Snow Camp
- Iola, about 3 miles (4.8 km) east of Altamahaw, nearly due north of Glencoe
- Lacey, about 1-mile (1.6 km) east of Eli Whitney
- Leota, approximately 1-mile (1.6 km) south of Eli Whitney
- Loy, at the northern base of Bass Mountain
- Manndale
- Maywood, approximately 3 miles (4.8 km) northeast of Altamahaw
- McCray (McRay), about 2 miles (3.2 km) east-northeast of Glencoe
- Melville, approximately 2 miles (3.2 km) west-southwest of the intersection of Interstate 40 and NC Highway 119
- Morton's Store, approximately 2 miles (3.2 km) north of Altamahaw
- Nicholson, near the intersection of NC Highway 87 and Bellemont-Mount Hermon Road
- Oakdale, in the southwest of the county, near the intersection of NC Highway 49 and Greensboro-Chapel Hill Road
- Oneida
- Osceola
- Pleasant Grove, in the far northeast part of the county, 2 miles (3.2 km) east-northeast of the current Pleasant Grove
- Pleasant Lodge, 1-mile (1.6 km) to the west of the site of Oakdale, near the Alamance-Guilford county line
- Rock Creek, 4 miles (6.4 km) due south of Alamance
- Shallow Ford, 1-mile (1.6 km) east of Ossipee
- Shady Grove
- Stainback, about 2 miles (3.2 km) east-northeast of Green Level
- Sutpin, on the same latitude as Snow Camp, approximately halfway between Snow Camp and Eli Whitney
- Sylvester
- Union Ridge, near the east bank of Lake Cammack, about 3 miles (4.8 km) from the Alamance-Caswell county line
- Vincent, 2 miles (3.2 km) north-northeast of Pleasant Grove

=== Population ranking ===
The population ranking of the following table is based on the 2020 census of Alamance County.

† = county seat

| Rank | Name | Type | Population (2020 census) |
|---|---|---|---|
| 1 | Burlington | City | 57,303 |
| 2 | Mebane | City | 17,797 |
| 3 | † Graham | City | 17,157 |
| 4 | Elon | Town | 11,336 |
| 5 | Gibsonville | Town | 8,920 |
| 6 | Glen Raven | CDP | 3,239 |
| 7 | Green Level | Town | 3,152 |
| 8 | Swepsonville | Town | 2,445 |
| 9 | Haw River | Town | 2,252 |
| 10 | Saxapahaw | CDP | 1,671 |
| 11 | Alamance | Village | 988 |
| 12 | Woodlawn | CDP | 912 |
| 13 | Ossipee | Town | 536 |
| 14 | Altamahaw | CDP | 334 |

== Notable people ==
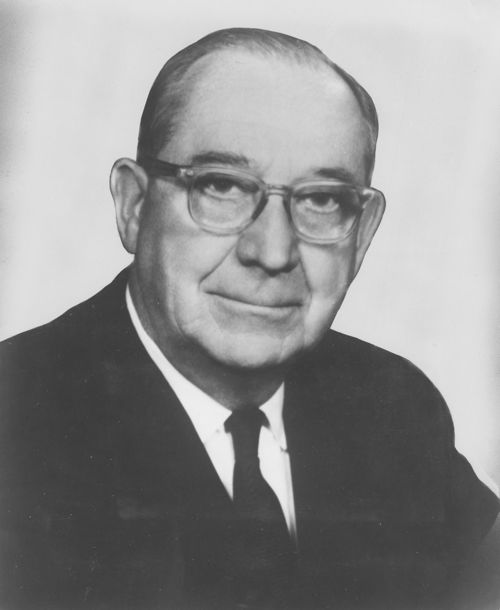
U. S. Senator B. Everett Jordan

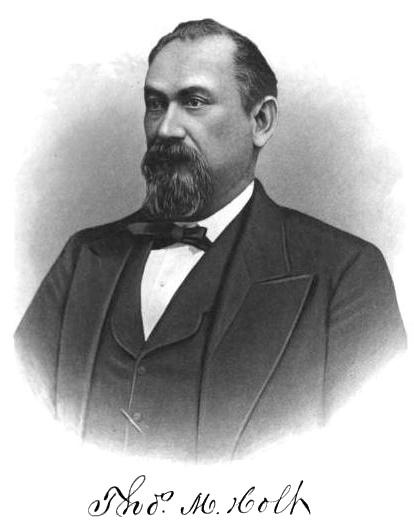
Governor Thomas M. Holt

- Jacob Brent, born in Graham, starred as "Mr. Mistoffelees" in the Broadway and movie version of Andrew Lloyd Webber's Cats
- Billy Bryan, Center for the Denver Broncos, from 1977 to 1988 grew up in Burlington.
- Several generations of Alex Haley's family may have lived in Alamance County, as noted in his 1976 Pulitzer Prize-winning novel Roots: The Saga of an American Family. Coming from Africa to Virginia, to Caswell County, to Alamance County, and moving to Tennessee after the Emancipation Proclamation.
- Thomas Michael Holt, governor of North Carolina from 1891 to 1893
- John "John Boy" Isley, born and raised in Graham, "John Boy" of the John Boy and Billy Show
- Charley Jones, born in Alamance County, Major League Baseball player
- B. Everett Jordan, U. S. senator (Class 2) from 1958 to 1973
- Don Kernodle, born in Burlington, five-time NWA champion and tag team partner of Sgt Slaughter; appeared in Paradise Alley with Sylvester Stallone
- Jack McKeon, manager of the 2003 World Series champion Florida Marlins
- Blanche Taylor Moore, convicted murderer, whose life story was portrayed in the television movie "Black Widow: The Blanche Taylor Moore Story," starring Elizabeth Montgomery
- Meg Scott Phipps, North Carolina Agriculture Commissioner (2001–2003)
- Tequan Richmond, born in Burlington, stars as Drew Rock in Everybody Hates Chris, and played a young Ray Charles in the movie Ray
- Jeanne Robertson, humorist and professional speaker
- Robert W. "Bob" Scott, governor of North Carolina from 1969 to 1973
- W. Kerr Scott, Governor of North Carolina from 1949 to 1953, U. S. senator (Class 2) from 1954 to 1958
- Brandon Tate, born in Burlington, American football wide receiver for the Cincinnati Bengals of the National Football League
- Will Richardson, American football Offensive Linemen for the Jacksonville Jaguars of the National Football League

== See also ==
- List of counties in North Carolina
- National Register of Historic Places listings in Alamance County, North Carolina
- List of ghost towns in North Carolina
- Haw River Valley AVA, wine region partially located in the county
- Occaneechi Band of the Saponi Nation, state-recognized tribe that resides in the county
