= Battle at the Yadkin River =

1771 battle of the Regulator Movement

- Part of the Regulator Movement
Date	May 9, 1771 (255 years ago)
Location	Yadkin River, North Carolina 51°04′26″N 1°47′37″W
Result	Regulator victory

Belligerents
Regulators	Great Britain

Commanders and leaders
Benjamin Merrill	(Kingdom of Great Britain) Hugh Waddell

Strength
~300 regulators	~300 provincials

The Battle at the Yadkin River was a battle of the Regulator Movement fought at the crossing of the Yadkin River on May 9, 1771.

== Battle ==
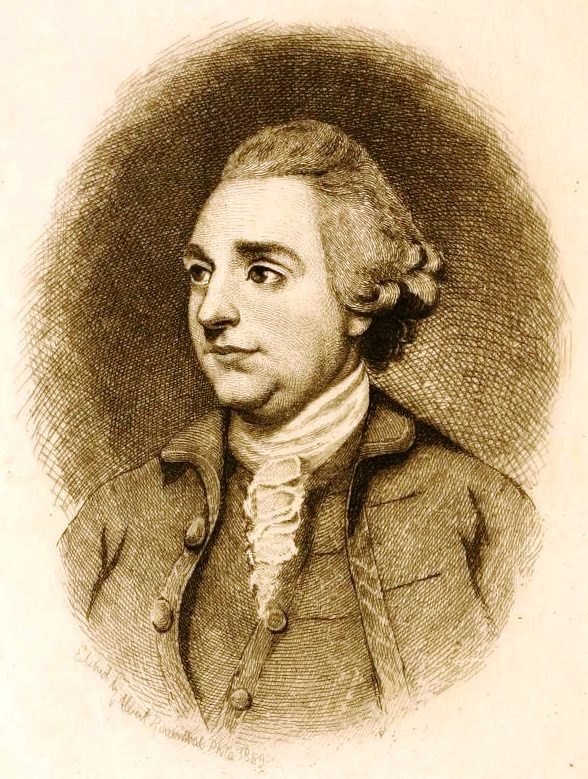
Portrait of Hugh Waddell

Governor William Tryon had dispatched Gen. Hugh Waddell to raise militia in Rowan and Mecklenburg counties for the purpose of capturing a force of Regulators under Benjamin Merrill known to be operating in the area. Waddell reached Salisbury and attempted to march north, but was hampered when a large supply of gunpowder and firearms being brought by wagon from Charleston was captured and blown up by Regulators.

With little ammunition, Waddell hoped to link up with Tryon's militia but instead found his path blocked at the crossing of the Yadkin River by Merrill and a large force of Regulators. A majority of his militiamen, many of whom sympathized with the Regulators, surrendered, and Waddell was compelled to turn back to Salisbury. A couple of days later, the advance of a company of reinforcements – a part of Governor William Tryon's army – contravened Merrill's planned rendezvous with forces under Regulator leader Herman Husband encamped at the Great Alamance Creek, and he was forced to turn to the east and deal with the new threat before heading to the rebel camp.

The several day's delay resulted in Merrill's troop arriving too late to play a role in the Battle of Alamance, and he and several others were captured and executed. Waddell's remaining force eventually linked up with Tryon's troops at Reedy Creek on June 4, 1771, but the uprising was by that time essentially over.

== Sources ==
- Cashion, Jerry C. (1996). "Waddell, Hugh". In Powell, William S (ed.). Dictionary of North Carolina Biography. Vol. 6 (T–Z). Chapel Hill, NC: University of North Carolina Press. ISBN 978-0-8078-6699-3.
- Fitche, William Edward (1905). "Some Neglected History of North Carolina". pp. 189–195, 237, 252–253.
- Ervin, Sam James (1917). "A Colonial History of Rowan County, North Carolina, Volumes 16-19". pp. 38–39.
