= Alamance Battleground =

Battlefield in North Carolina, United States

- Alamance Battleground; State Historic Site
- U.S. National Register of Historic Places
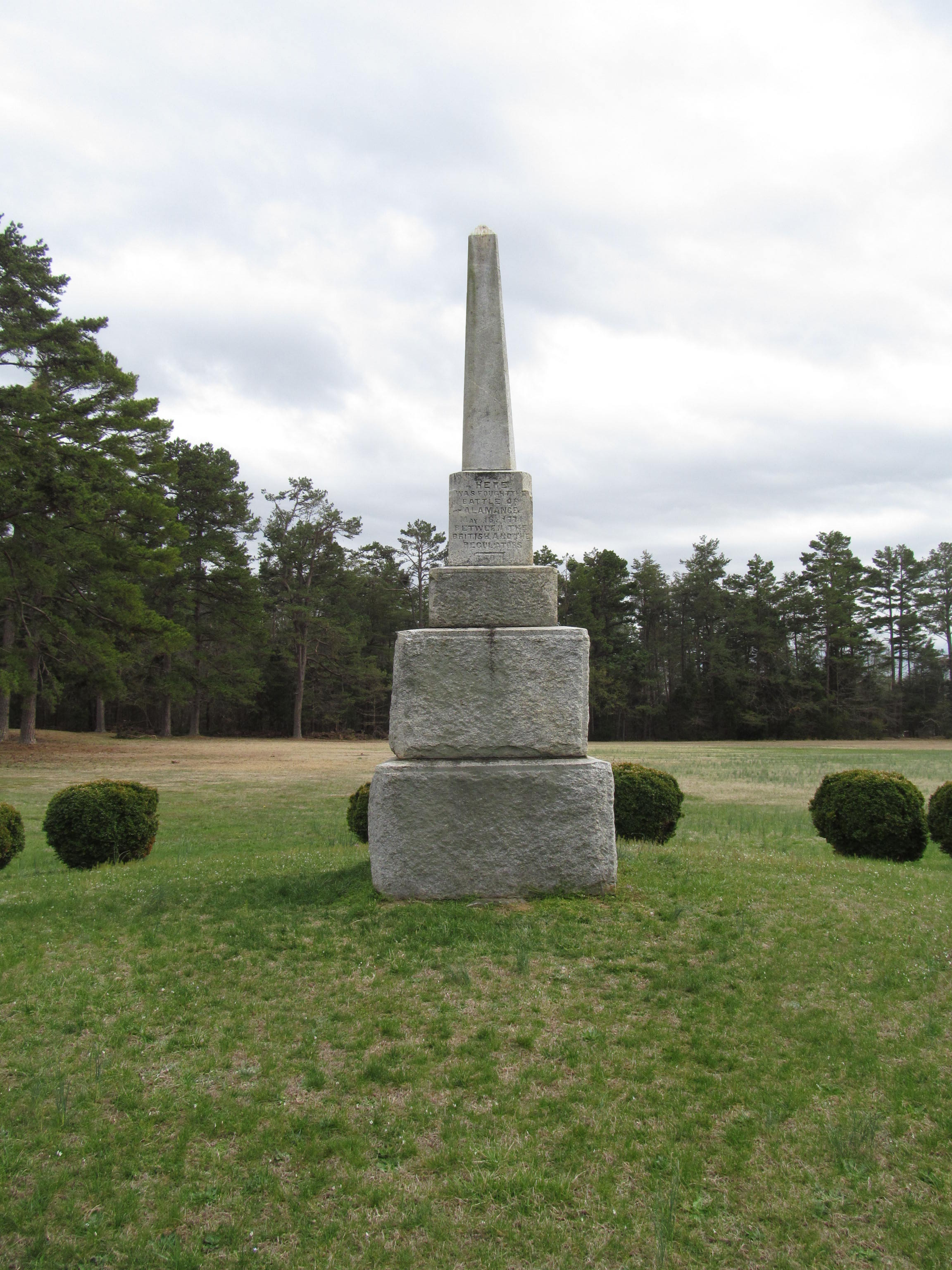
- Battle of Alamance Monument, Alamance Battleground State Historic Site, in 2014
- Location: Alamance County, North Carolina
- Nearest city: Burlington
- Coordinates: 36.0115°N 79.5217°W
- Area: 40 acres (16 ha)
- NRHP reference No.: 70000435
- Added to NRHP: February 26, 1970

Alamance Battleground is a North Carolina State Historic Site commemorating the Battle of Alamance. The battlefield is located south of Burlington, North Carolina.

== Description and administrative history ==
The Battle of Alamance took place on May 16, 1771, as a part of the Regulator Movement between the North Carolina militia commanded by Governor William Tryon, and the "Regulators," an organized protest movement seeking to reform the provincial government. The historic site belongs to the North Carolina Department of Natural and Cultural Resources and was established to preserve part of the battlefield and provide historical interpretation of the lifestyle of the settlers in 1770s north central North Carolina. Family papers, books, and documents relate the story of the era, providing authentic examples of living on the frontier during the 18th and 19th centuries.

A visitor center at the site allows visitors to view several historical items - including the powder horn of Harmon Cox, the only known surviving archeological relic from the Battle of Alamance, in a small museum. Outside the visitors center is a 3-pounder cannon replica and a map of the battleground site. Outside the visitors center, the grounds are marked with 2 granite monuments. The smaller monument was given as a memorial in 1880 while the larger monument featuring a statue of James Hunter, the so-called "General of the Regulators", was erected in 1901. The grounds are crossed by a ¾ mile trail, and key battle positions. campsite. A smokehouse also stands on the grounds. There is a plaque that commemorates the deaths of the six men who were hanged by Governor Tryon following the defeat of the Regulators: James Pugh, Robert Matear, Benjamin Merrill, Captain Messer, and two others.

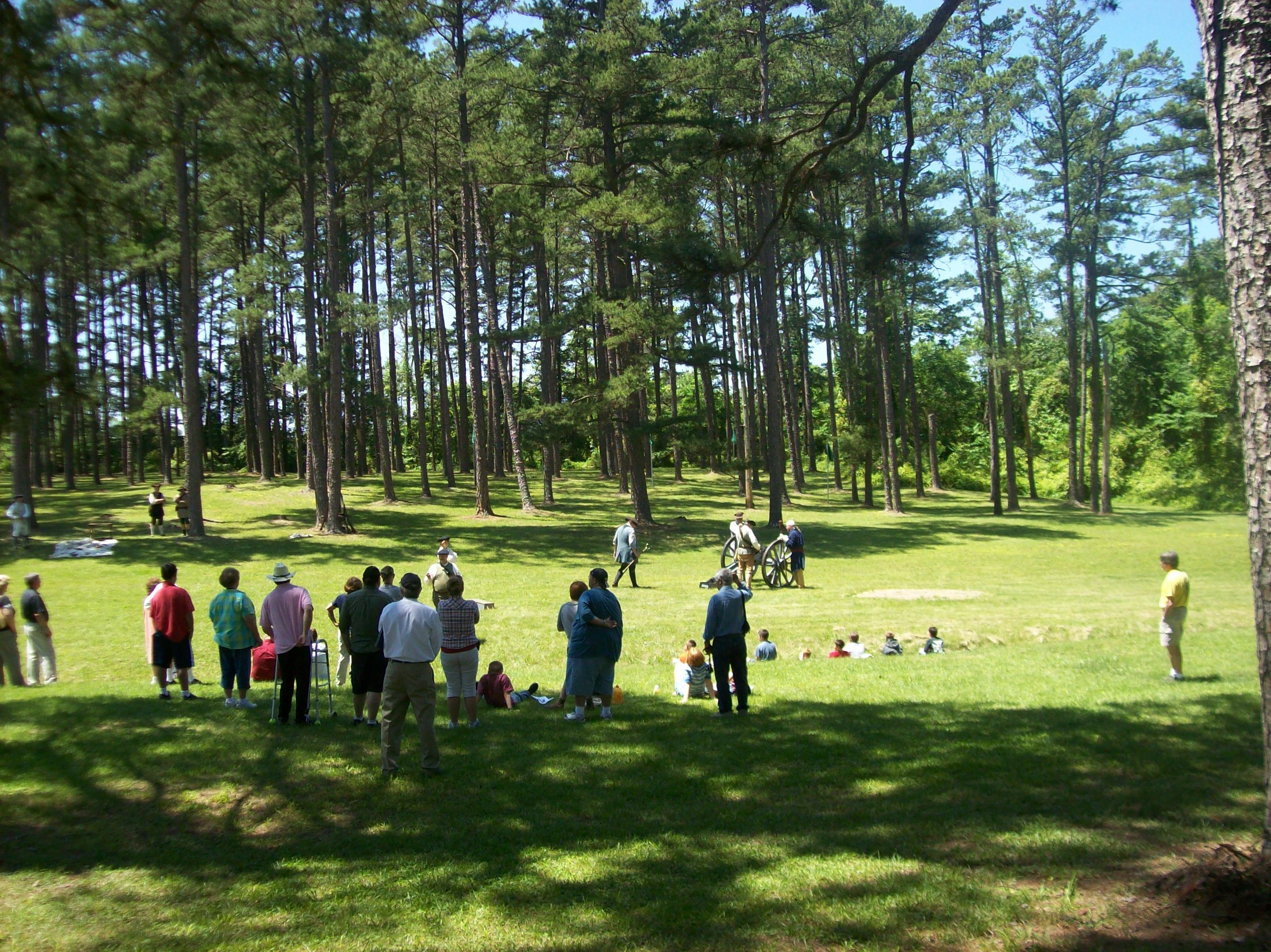
Historical reenactment at the Alamance Battleground, 2008

Alamance Battleground State Historic Site also includes the John Allen House, which family sources suggest was constructed around 1780. John's sister, Amy, was the wife of Herman Husband, an agitator and pamphleteer prominent in the Regulator movement who was present at the Battle of Alamance. Donated by descendants of the family and moved from nearby Snow Camp to the current site, the frontier style, one room log home is furnished with restored, original pieces from the period. Guided tours of the Allen House are provided upon request. The visitor center has several exhibits a The battleground is largely handicapped accessible. Ten picnic tables are available for use by visitors. A gift shop is also located within the visitor center.

Archaeological studies begun in 2009 have also found evidence of a Revolutionary War skirmish that occurred between the Delaware Light Infantry and British General Charles Cornwallis' forces on March 5, 1781, one of several small battles to occur in the area prior to the Battle of Guilford Courthouse. Evidence was also found of a Civil War era encampment of the 3rd North Carolina Junior Reserve unit under the command of Col. John Hinsdale, who camped on the site shortly before surrendering near High Point to Union forces.

== See also ==
- List of North Carolina state parks
- National Register of Historic Places listings in Alamance County, North Carolina
