= Harmon Cox =

Regulator leader, soldier, miller (1723-1812)

- Harmon Cox's powderhorn at the Alamance battlefield museum
- Born: February 1723; Hockessin, New Castle, Colony of Delaware
- Died: February 1812 (aged 88–89) Ramseur, Randolph County, North Carolina, United States
- Allegiance: North Carolina Regulators
- Service years: 1766–1771
- Known for: Leader in the Regulator Movement
- Conflicts: War of the Regulation: Battle of Alamance
- Spouse: Jane John (1725–1795)
- Children: 10, including Nathan Cox and Harmon Cox Jr.

Harmon Cox was an American Regulator, miller, and farmer, who was one of at least fifteen captured at the Battle of Alamance, and one of at least six pardoned by Governor Tryon and spared the gallows in Hillsboro, North Carolina. He was one of the leaders of the Regulator Movement and held meetings at his house. He also operated a gristmill which was extremely profitable. He used these profits to help fund the Regulator Movement and supply them.

== Early life and family ==
Harmon Cox was born in 1723 to William Cox (1692–1767) and Catherine Kinkey (1696–1752). He married Jane John on Dec. 25, 1745 in Loudoun County, Virginia. They would have 10 children together. His mothers family were Dutch and Czech settlers in Delaware and New York State. His great-grandfather was Lord Casparus Augustus Hermann (1656–1697). His 2nd great-grandfather was Augustine Herman, who moved to the United States in the early seventeenth century from Prague, Czechia. His paternal grandfather was William Cox of Gloucester (b. 1658), who immigrated to Delaware from England.

== Regulator movement ==
List of Regulator Equipment seized from Harmon Cox's house

In 1764, farmers in today's Alamance, Chatham, Guilford, and Randolph counties, became increasing unhappy with local colonial officials levying more taxes to help pay British debts, incurred during the French and Indian War. Herman Husband, a farmer in Orange County, North Carolina was one such vocal opponent against unfair taxation. His Quaker beliefs caused him to want a peaceful resolution by bringing both sides together. Husbands, correspondences with Benjamin Franklin led the British to believe that he was the main leader. Husband was a first cousin to Harmon Cox. Harmon also signed Regulator notices and petitions, as well as hosting a meeting in 1768 at his home/mill.

At the Battle of Alamance in 1771, William Tryon defeated 2000 North Carolina militia. Harmon Cox was captured during the battle, along with several others. Tryon issued a few of the men pardons, including Cox, and the rest were hung. After this, a detachment was sent to Harmon's home to take supplies future regulators could use.

== Later life ==
Harmon was disowned by the Quakers at Cane Creek Friends Meeting in June 1771 because of his regulator involvement and non peaceful treatment of the situation. He later became a member of the Mill Creek Friends Meeting was established in "Cox's Settlement" as an outgrowth of Cane Creek Meeting. He prospered and, according to the History of Randolph County 1779–1979, was one of the twelve wealthiest men in the county by 1779, making lots of money off of his mill. He died in 1812.
