= Benjamin Merrill =

American military officer, gunsmith and planter (1731–1771)

Coordinates: 36°04′31.3″N 79°05′39.8″W

- Born: c. 1731; Hopewell, New Jersey
- Died: 19 June 1771 (aged c. 40); North Carolina
- Military career
- Service years: 1771
- Conflicts: Regulator War; Battle at the Yadkin River; Battle of Alamance (POW)

Captain Benjamin Merrill (c. 1731 – June 19, 1771) was an American Regulator, military officer, gunsmith and planter who served in the militia of Rowan County, North Carolina. He sided with the Regulator Movement in North Carolina, and was captured following the Battle of Alamance on May 16, 1771. Shortly thereafter, he was executed as a rebel by Governor William Tryon.

== Early life ==
Merrill was born c. 1731 in Hopewell, New Jersey. He became a gunsmith and plantation owner. His lands included a river with a strong current "...sufficient to power the machinery used in boring out the barrels." His residence was located four miles south of Lexington, North Carolina, in what was then Orange County. It was reported that Merrill was a deacon of the nearby Jersey church, a Baptist congregation founded around 1755 by settlers from New Jersey. He was married to Jemima Smith, daughter of Andrew Smith of Hopewell, and was known to have had eight to ten children.

== Regulator movement ==
The Regulation movement (or "War of the Regulation") was at first a low intensity action carried on by colonists from around 1766 to 1771 against local and state officials and offices in the Carolinas. The colonials had become upset over issues of what some considered unfair taxation, local government corruption, and local government control. At first, the colonial governments did little to intercede; but by early 1771, North Carolina Governor Tryon had had enough, now viewing the perpetrators as full fledged rebels. Governor Tryon sent General Hugh Waddell through Rowan and Mecklenburg to raise troops. Waddell enlisted almost one hundred in Mecklenburg and about the same number in Rowan. At this time, Captain Merrill had also rallied a company of three hundred men, most of whom were Baptists, from the Jersey Settlement (in what is now Davidson County). From here Captain Merrill marched to meet other Regulator forces, who were convinced an overwhelming show of force would intimidate the government forces into withdrawal, rather than to actually fight. The Regulator militia was gathering a large force at a camp site along the Alamance Creek.

"[Merrill] was regarded as a pious man; and was much esteemed wherever he was known. He was within an easy day's march of the place of meeting (Battle of Alamance) with three hundred men under his command, when he heard of the defeat; and if he had got there in time the result would have been different. His men immediately dispersed, but he was taken prisoner, and his life was the forfeit. In this trying situation he gave his friends satisfactory evidence that he was prepared to die; for he not only professed his faith in Christ his hope of heaven and willingness to go, but sung a song very devoutly just before he swung off, and died with the resignation and composure of a Christian. One of his enemies was heard to say 'If all went to the gallows with Captain Merrill's character, hanging would be an honorable death.' "

=== Alamance ===
On May 9, when marching to join Tryon, Waddell was intercepted at the Yadkin by the much larger force of Regulators under Merrill. Realizing his force was outnumbered, Waddell fell back to the Salisbury District. He was unable to join the governor until after the battle. Meanwhile Tryon had proceeded westward from Hillsborough with just under eleven hundred men. He met the forces of the insurgents at Alamance Creek and defeated them, thereby bringing open opposition of the Regulators to an end. Captain Merrill arrived after the battle had been decided; his force was scattered and he was taken prisoner.

The Battle of Alamance was the only full-scale—and the decisive battle—of the war.

=== Battle aftermath ===
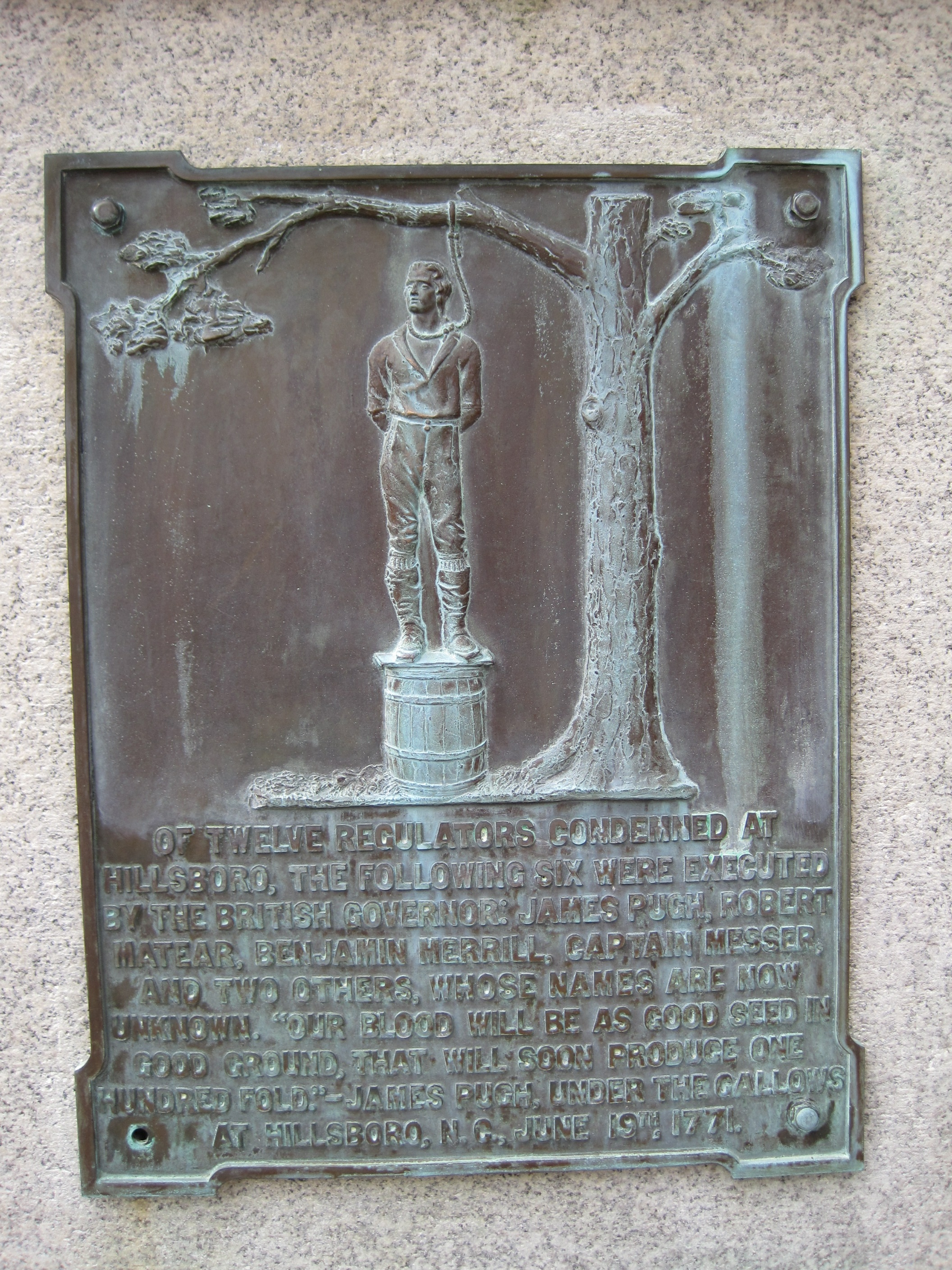
A plaque from the Alamance Battleground commemorating Merrill's execution.

From May 30 to June 20, 1771, the court of oyer and terminer was held at Hillsborough for the trial of the Regulators captured at Alamance. Twelve were convicted of high treason, and six of them were sentenced to be hanged, drawn, and quartered for their part in the uprising, including three officers of the colonial militia who had joined ranks with the Regulator's: Merrill, Captain Robert Messer, and Captain Robert Matear.

== Final petition to Lord Hillsborough and death ==
In a letter from Governor Tryon to Lord Hillsborough, Tryon asked for consideration to be given to the widow Merrill and her children:

"Benjamin Merrill a Captain of the militia, at the hour of his execution, left it in charge of the officers to solicit me to petition His Majesty to grant his plantation and estate to his wife and eight children. He died under a thorough conviction of his crime and the justice of his sentence, and addressed himself to the spectators to take warning by his suffering. His Majesty's indulgence to this request would, I am persuaded, be dutifully and affectionatley [sic] received by his unhappy widow and children." —Wme. Tryon

The request was granted, although later played down by the Patriots of the Revolution. Merrill and his five companions were hanged on June 19, 1771, near Hillsborough, North Carolina.

== Memorial ==
There is a memorial plaque placed along Old Halifax Rd., in Hillsborough, North Carolina marking the place of the execution.
