= Robert Howe (Continental Army officer) =

Continental Army officer (c. 1732–1786)

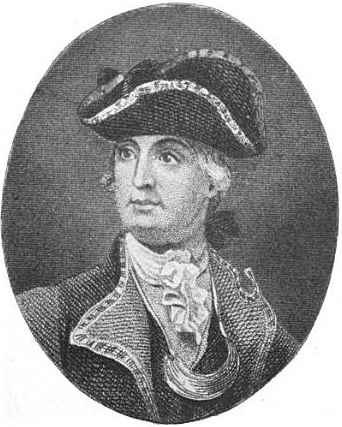
- Portrait of Howe
- Born: c. 1732; New Hanover County, North Carolina
- Died: December 14, 1786 (aged 53–54); Bladen County, North Carolina
- Burial place: Columbus County, North Carolina
- Relatives: James Moore Sr. (great-grandfather)
- Military career
- Allegiance: Great Britain (1755–1774); United Colonies (1775–1776); United States (1776–1783)
- Branch: North Carolina militia Continental Army
- Rank: Major General
- Nickname: "Bob" Howe
- Commands: 2nd North Carolina Regiment (1775–1776); Southern Department (1777–1778); Commandant of the fortifications at West Point (1780–1780)
- Conflicts: French and Indian War; Regulator Movement in North Carolina; Battle of Alamance; American Revolutionary War; Burning of Norfolk; Capture of Savannah; Battle of Stony Point

Robert Howe (/haʊ/; c. 1732 – December 14, 1786) was an American military officer who served in the American Revolutionary War. The descendant of a prominent North Carolinian family, he was one of five general officers, and the only major general, in the Continental Army from North Carolina. Howe also played a role in the colonial and state governments of North Carolina, serving in the legislative bodies of both.

Howe served in the colonial militia during the French and Indian War and commanded Fort Johnston at the mouth of the Cape Fear River. He also served as a colonel of Governor William Tryon's artillery during the Regulator Movement in North Carolina. Howe suffered greatly when Tryon, a personal friend, became governor of New York, and he staunchly opposed Tryon's successor. He became active in organizing efforts within North Carolina and among the American colonies between 1773 and 1775 and was an active member of the North Carolina Provincial Congress. At the outset of the Revolutionary War, Howe was promoted to brigadier general and was heavily involved in actions in the Southern Department, leading a combined force of Continental Army regulars and Patriot militia to defeat at the British capture of Savannah in 1778.

Howe's career as a military commander was contentious and consumed primarily by conflict with political and military leaders in Georgia and South Carolina. In 1778, he fought a duel with Christopher Gadsden of South Carolina which was spurred in part by Howe's conflict with South Carolina's state government. Political and personal confrontations, combined with Howe's reputation as a womanizer among those who disfavored him, eventually led to the Continental Congress stripping him of his command over the Southern Department. He was then sent to New York, where he served under General George Washington in the Hudson Highlands, although Howe did not have a successful or significant career in that theater.

Howe sat as a senior officer on the court-martial board that sentenced to death John André, a British officer accused of assisting Benedict Arnold in the latter's plot to change allegiance and deliver West Point to the British. Howe himself was accused of attempting to defect to the British, but the accusations were cast aside at the time as having been based in a British attempt to cause further discord in the Continental Army. Howe also played a role in putting down several late-war mutinies by members of the Pennsylvania and New Jersey Lines in New Jersey and Philadelphia and returned home to North Carolina in 1783. He again became active in state politics, but died in December 1786 while en route to a session of the North Carolina House of Commons.

== Early life and family ==
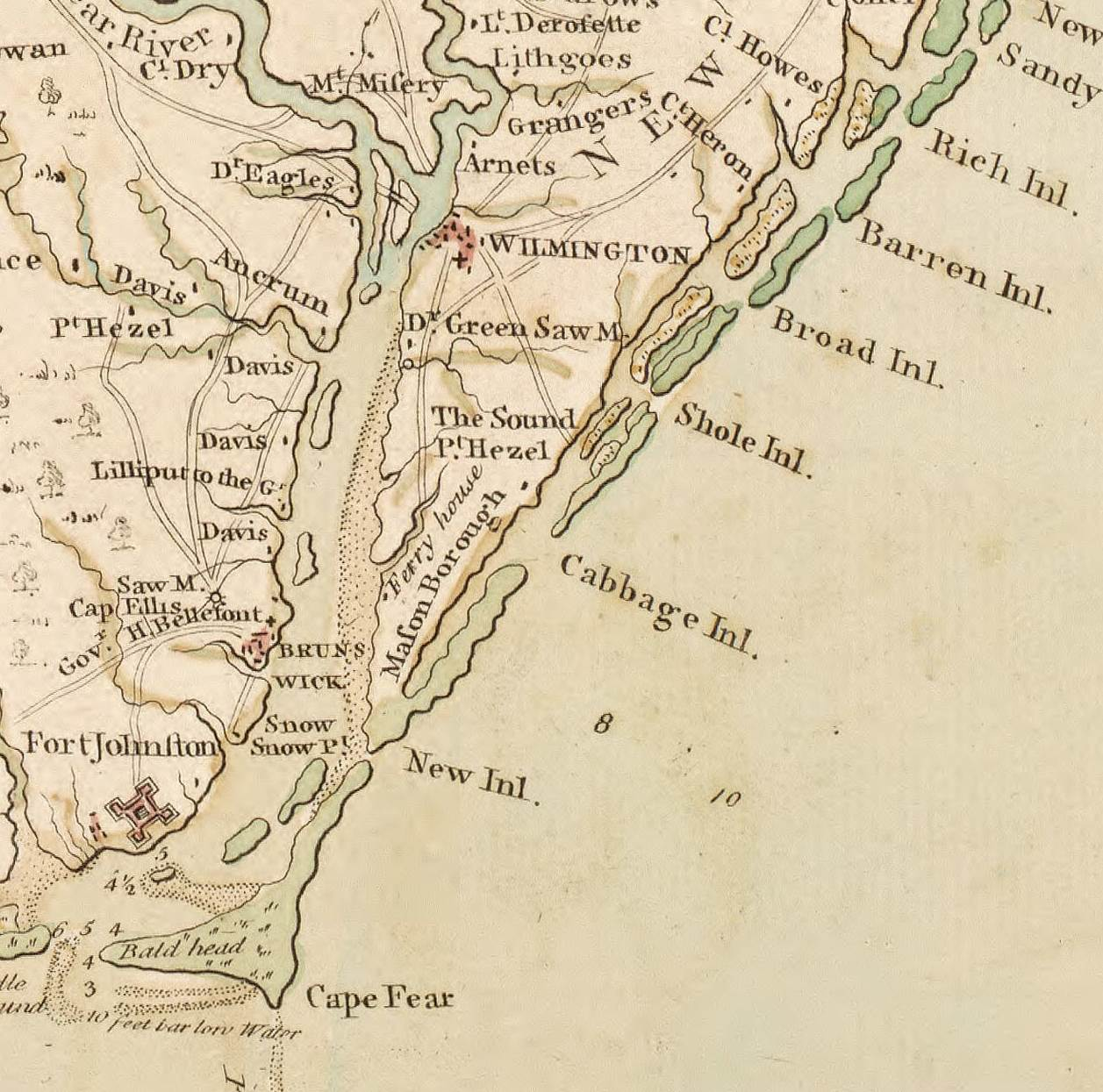
A portion of John Collet's 1770 map of North Carolina depicting the environs of the lower Cape Fear, including Howe's plantation at top right, located near Barren Inlet

Howe was born in 1732 to Job Howe (also spelled "Howes"), the grandson of Governor James Moore, who presided over the southern portion of the Province of Carolina. Job was also a descendant of Governor John Yeamans. Howe's mother may have been Job's first wife Martha, who was the daughter of colonial North Carolina jurist Frederick Jones. Job Howe's ancestors had been planters and political figures in South Carolina during the late 17th and early 18th centuries. Prior to Howe's birth, his family left Charleston to settle on the banks of the Cape Fear River in the Province of North Carolina. Howe's father was a member of the extended Moore family, formerly of South Carolina, who settled the lower Cape Fear River and collectively owned more than 80,000 acres (32,000 ha; 120 sq mi) of farmland on it by the 1730s. Job Howe died in 1748, leaving his estate and the wealth of his parents to Robert. Robert had two brothers and two sisters, all of whom were mentioned in Job's will.

As a young boy, Howe may have been sent to England to obtain an education, although several sources doubt that Howe made the journey. At some point between 1751 and 1754, after completing his education, Howe married Sarah Grange, who was heiress to a large fortune. Howe had numerous affairs, fathering an unknown number of children in and out of wedlock, including a son, Robert; two daughters, Mary and Ann; and up to four additional daughters whose mothers' names are not recorded. Howe was widely considered a womanizer by contemporaries; by 1772 he became estranged from Grange, and the two separated. In the year of their formal separation, Howe recorded a deed for the support of his wife.

Loyalist sympathizer and diarist Janet Schaw described Howe prior to the revolution:

... very like a Gentleman, much more so indeed than any thing I have seen in the Country. He is deemed a horrid animal, a sort of a woman-eater that devours every thing that comes in his way, and that no woman can withstand him. But be not in pain for your friend, I do assure you they overrate his merits, and as I am certain it would be in the power of mortal women to withstand him, so am I convinced he is not so voracious as he is represented.

Howe inherited a large amount of assets from his grandmother and, upon the death of his father, became the owner of "Howe's Point" a plantation on the Cape Fear River, as well as a rice plantation near what was formerly known as Barren Inlet (now called Mason Inlet). The site of the former plantation is located on the mainland directly across from Figure Eight Island. Howe also owned a plantation called "Mount Misery" in what was Bladen County. His grandmother had provided Howe with slaves and money with which Howe was intended to build his fortune.

== Colonial political and military service ==
Around 1755, Howe captained a militia company in Bladen County, and was appointed a justice of the peace for that county in 1756. Howe was elected to the Province of North Carolina House of Burgesses from Bladen County in 1760 and served until 1762. In 1764, the Assembly created Brunswick County, and Howe was both appointed its justice of the peace and re-elected to the Assembly from the new county. Howe would be re-elected six more times from Brunswick County. In 1765, Howe worked with other colonial leaders such as Hugh Waddell, Abner Nash, and Cornelius Harnett to found the Wilmington Sons of Liberty organization, which was active in protesting the Stamp Act 1765 that taxed most printed materials. At the time, the members of the Sons of Liberty did not consider their resistance to be rebellion, as it was based on the idea that government officials who performed acts in opposition to the will of the people were not acting with full authority. After the resolution of the Stamp Act Crisis, Howe was made an officer of the provincial exchequer. Despite the Cape Fear River area being the epicenter of Stamp Act protests in North Carolina, Howe took no substantial part in the active confrontations with Governor William Tryon, due in large part to their personal friendship and the patronage provided by the Governor for Howe's political ambitions.

During the Anglo-Cherokee War, Howe commanded a company in the NC Provincial Regiment, alongside provincial soldiers from Virginia. In 1766, he was commissioned as a captain of militia and was given command of Fort Johnston, located at the entrance of the Cape Fear River in present-day Southport, North Carolina. Howe served in this capacity between 1766 and 1767, and again between 1769 and 1773. Although satisfied with this position, Howe ultimately desired to obtain a commission in the regular British Army, which was traditionally a prerequisite for the commander of Fort Johnston. Howe was never granted this commission, despite Tryon's support. In the 1768 session of the colonial assembly, Howe played a prominent role by introducing a bill to remedy a currency shortage in the colony. His bill would have led to the acceptance of commodities as legal tender in the province, but it was not passed. The Regulator movement was in part based on the grievances farmers in the North Carolina backcountry had about back taxes and pressure from private creditors, both of which Howe's 1768 bill had attempted to address.

Despite his efforts to reform the province's policies, Howe was made a colonel of artillery by Governor Tryon and served under the Governor against armed protesters in the piedmont during the War of the Regulation. Howe was among the Governor's entourage when he confronted the Regulators in Hillsborough in 1768, and in 1771, at the Battle of Alamance, Howe served in a dual role as a commander of artillery and quartermaster general. In early 1773, when Josiah Quincy II visited North Carolina to foster cooperation between Southern activists and those in Boston, he investigated the causes of the War of the Regulation to which he had been sympathetic. Howe served as Quincy's guide and with the assistance of Cornelius Harnett and William Hooper convinced Quincy that the Regulator movement had been unjustified and wrong to take up arms against Tryon. Quincy found Howe to be a "most happy compound of the man of sense, the sword, the Senate, and the buck ... a favorite of the man of sense and the female world", continuing to say that "[Howe] has faults and vice – but alas who is without them." More importantly, however, Quincy's visit with Howe, Hooper, and Harnett engendered a desire among those present to open up inter-colonial lines of communication in order to coordinate responses to future impositions by the British government.

Howe's private fortunes were never stable, and between 1766 and 1775, he was forced to mortgage land and sell slaves to generate funds. In 1770, Howe was able to purchase Kendal Plantation on the Cape Fear River, a 400-acre (160 ha; 0.63 sq mi) rice plantation, but in 1775, he mortgaged it for around £214. While the causes of Howe's financial misfortunes are unknown, several contemporary critics held that the cause was Howe's need to keep up appearances among the ruling elite, while Josiah Martin, Tryon's successor as Royal Governor, believed Howe's misfortunes were evidence of his potential for malfeasance with the public money. In particular, Martin believed that Howe was intentionally under-staffing Fort Johnston in order to pocket excess funds the colonial assembly had appropriated for the garrison there, which was a common form of embezzlement among previous commanders and other royal officials. Howe, as a legislator and public official, had a poor working relationship with Martin, and Martin deprived him of his appointed offices – the captaincy of Fort Johnston and his position with the provincial exchequer – shortly after the new governor's arrival. A legislative confrontation in 1770 over the Provincial Assembly's attempts to pass a law authorizing attachment of real property in North Carolina owned by persons living in England placed Howe in direct confrontation with Martin, who preferred a requirement that colonial subjects seek relief from courts in England rather than in North Carolina. Martin believed that Howe's virulent opposition to the new governor's policies was driven by Howe's anger at being deprived of his valuable appointed positions.

== Revolutionary political and militia service ==
In December 1773, the North Carolina colonial assembly created a committee of correspondence, to which Howe, as well as Richard Caswell, John Harvey, John Ashe, Joseph Hewes, and Samuel Johnston were appointed. That committee was tasked with corresponding with other colonies to coordinate plans of resistance to British attempts to tax or otherwise burden the colonists. Beginning in 1774, Howe was a member of the Wilmington and Brunswick County Committees of Safety, and in August of that year, served as a member of a committee that organized the collection of corn, flour, and pork to be sent to Boston. At the time, the Port of Boston had been closed by one of the Intolerable Acts, specifically the Boston Port Act, which was in reaction to the Boston Tea Party and other protests against the Tea Act.

When the First Provincial Congress convened on August 25, 1774, Howe served as a member of that body representing Brunswick County. The First Provincial Congress quickly passed a bill banning the exportation of all pitch, tobacco, tar, and other trade goods to England and banned the importation of British tea into North Carolina. Also in 1774, Howe penned several documents expressing what would become known as Patriot or "whig" sympathies, including an address demanding reforms from Royal Governor Josiah Martin. On April 7, 1775, Howe delivered an address to the colonial assembly formally rebuffing Governor Martin's demands that the extra-legal Second Provincial Congress be dissolved. Howe's response as adopted by the assembly led to Martin proroguing the colonial legislative body. In 1775, when Howe received news of the Battles of Lexington and Concord, the first military engagements of the American Revolutionary War, he began to drill the local militia, using the unusual combination of drums and fiddles as opposed to the standard fifes and drums.

On July 15, 1775, Howe led 500 militiamen from Brunswick Town on a raid on the governor's mansion with the intent of kidnapping Governor Martin. The plot failed when Martin made an early-morning escape from Fort Johnston, fleeing to HMS Cruizer on July 19. Howe ordered the militia to put the fort's structures to the torch, starting with the home of its commanding officer and Howe's successor, Captain John Collet, who had previously been accused of corruption by the Committee of Safety. After fleeing, Martin made a proclamation on August 8, 1775, that attributed the growing unrest in North Carolina to what he termed "'the basest and most scandalous Seditious and inflammatory falsehoods'" propagated by the Committee of Safety in Wilmington.

Howe once again represented Brunswick County in the Third Provincial Congress in Hillsborough beginning on August 20, 1775, and was appointed to the committee charged with developing a test oath for members of the legislative body. The oath declared allegiance to the King of England but denied the power of Parliament to tax to American colonies. During the Fourth North Carolina Provincial Congress in 1776, Howe was noted to have proclaimed that "'Independence seems to be the word. I know not one of the dissenting voice.'"

== Continental Army service ==
=== Burning of Norfolk ===
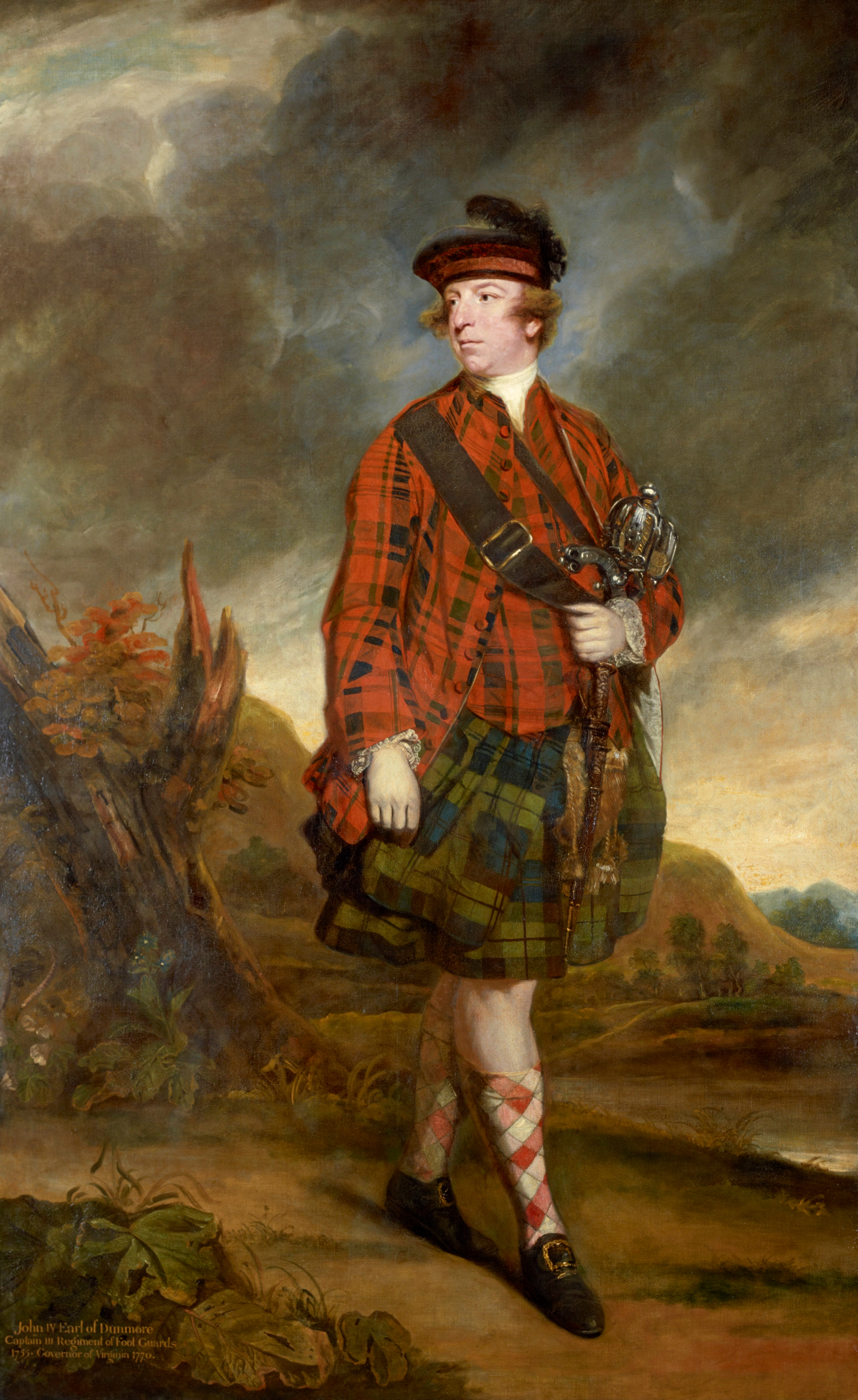
Dunmore, Howe's adversary at Norfolk, as painted by Joshua Reynolds in 1765

On September 1, 1775, the Third North Carolina Provincial Congress appointed Howe to lead the newly created Second North Carolina Regiment of the Continental Army as its colonel. Initially, Howe headquartered his command in New Bern during the fall of 1775 and was charged by the Provincial Congress with protecting the northern half of North Carolina up to the border with Virginia. At the time, British forces under the command of John Murray, 4th Earl of Dunmore, the last Royal Governor of the Colony of Virginia, were ravaging the tidewater region of Virginia. Howe, of his own initiative, brought his North Carolina troops into Virginia, arriving shortly after the Battle of Great Bridge. Howe then directed the occupation of Norfolk, Virginia, which had recently been abandoned by Loyalist forces, and assumed command of the various North Carolina and Virginia units there. The region around Norfolk was being occupied by Loyalist militia units under Dunmore's command.

Howe, as senior officer chosen over the more junior William Woodford of Virginia, engaged in contentious negotiations over access to supplies with the captains of British ships anchored off Norfolk, which were by that time overcrowded with Loyalist refugees. The situation deteriorated, and Norfolk was burned on January 1, 1776, in an action started by British marines and a bombardment by Royal Navy vessels and completed by Patriot forces. The fire raged on for two more days, and Howe ordered most of the buildings that remained standing to be razed before he withdrew, to further render the location useless to the British. During Howe's time in command at Norfolk, Woodford described the North Carolinian as a "brave, prudent & spirited commander". On December 22, 1775, Howe was formally thanked by the Virginia Convention, and on April 27, 1776, he received the same honor from the Fourth North Carolina Provincial Congress.

=== Charleston, 1776–1777 ===
In March 1776, Howe was promoted to the rank of Brigadier General by the Second Continental Congress along with fellow North Carolinian James Moore. Howe and Moore were two of five North Carolinians to be given a general's commission in the Continental Army. Initially, Howe was given command of all Continental forces in Virginia, but soon both he and Moore were ordered to South Carolina. Howe arrived first, as the presence of the British Army and Royal Navy under the command of General Henry Clinton at the mouth of the Cape Fear River delayed Moore's descent. When Clinton arrived off the coast of North Carolina, he issued a proclamation offering a pardon to anyone who had taken up arms against the crown with the explicit exception of Howe and fellow revolutionary Cornelius Harnett, then serving as president of the North Carolina Provincial Council, the executive body in the revolutionary state. Howe's plantation, Kendal, was sacked by the British during their maneuvers around Wilmington.

Upon arriving in Charleston, Howe acted as an adjutant to Major General Charles Lee, who had been appointed Commander of the Southern Department of the Continental Army. Howe directly commanded the South Carolina militia during the First Siege of Charleston in June 1776 and was assigned command over the defenses of the city proper. Lee was recalled to the North to assist General George Washington, and in his absence, James Moore was appointed Commander of the Southern Department. Howe was left in command of Charleston and Savannah, Georgia in Lee's absence, and in September 1776, he became embroiled in a controversy involving the provincial assembly of South Carolina allowing its officers to recruit soldiers from North Carolina's continental line units. Howe pleaded with the Provincial Congress of North Carolina to allow South Carolina to recruit within the former state's borders because of the greater number of white males in that state. Eventually, North Carolina acceded to that request but only after ordering Howe to reclaim the North Carolinians who had already been lured away by the South Carolinians. The South Carolina Council took offense and demanded that Howe pay the recruitment bonuses for the men if he wished to have them back. With James Moore's death on April 15, 1777, Howe assumed command of the Southern Department.

=== Florida and political conflict 1777–1778 ===
Howe's style of command was quick to cause discontent, and on August 20, 1777, the South Carolina Assembly protested against Howe's right to command soldiers within the borders of South Carolina. He was nonetheless promoted to the rank of major general on October 20, 1777, the only North Carolinian to reach that rank in the Continental Army. Howe often deferred to the civil leadership of the various states that made up his command, often referring conflicts with state officials to the Continental Congress to resolve. Of particular note was an early conflict with Georgia's state government, which insisted that the governor of that state retain command of the state's militia during military engagements. When asked for an official opinion, Congress sided with Howe, who believed that command of the militia should be relinquished to him during such engagements. Complicating matters, however, was that Congressional funding for military expenditures was given over to the states rather than the army officers, forcing Howe to rely on state governments for funding.

In 1778, he was ordered to act on a plan developed by General Charles Lee to assault British West Florida – a plan that Howe disfavored. A previous expedition in 1777, in which Howe did not directly participate, had ended quickly in failure. Congress overrode Howe's concerns about the expedition and directed him to proceed in conjunction with Georgia's militia into Florida. The combined Army's progress into Florida was made slow by a lack of provisions and particularly by a lack of slaves who Howe requested be made available to build roads and perform pioneering functions for the march southward.

On June 29, 1778, Howe captured Fort Tonyn on the St. Marys River, which forms a portion of the border between Georgia and Florida. Georgia Governor John Houstoun refused to give up command of his militia to the Continental Army general and declined to participate in Howe's council. To make matters worse, when South Carolina militia units arrived in Georgia under the command of Colonel Andrew Williamson, their commander also refused to allow Howe to command that state's militia units. Shortly after this minor incursion, the British received reinforcements and pressed toward Savannah. By July 14, 1778, Howe was forced to pull his units back north and returned to Charleston. The general received much of the blame for the expedition's failure, as Georgia officials were quick to cast aspersions on the Continental command, which was compounded by Congress' failure to understand Howe's inability to control the Georgia militia despite their prior determination of his command authority over militia units.

=== Duel with Christopher Gadsden, 1778 ===
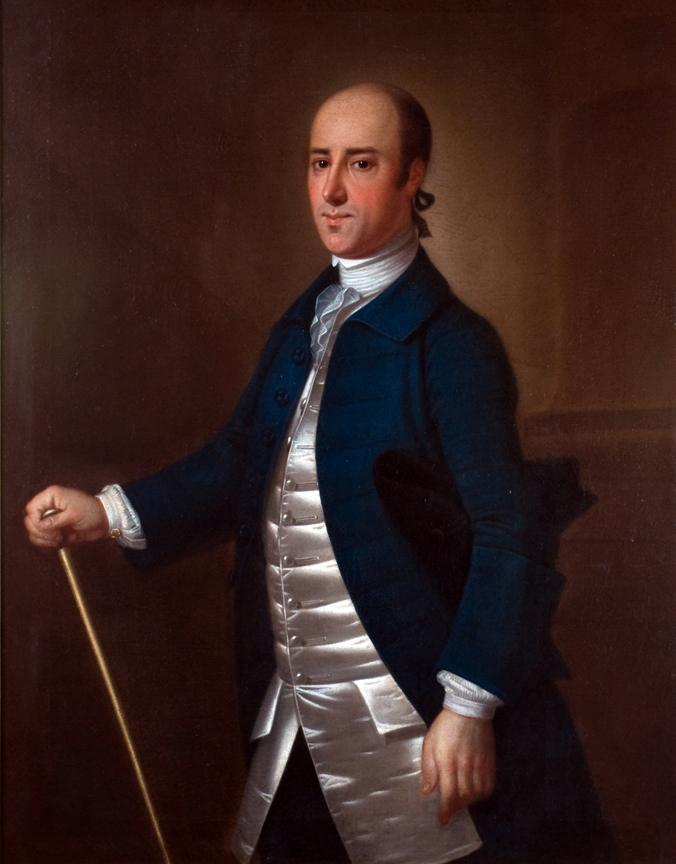
Christopher Gadsden, with whom Howe dueled in 1778, portrait by Jeremiah Theus, c. 1760–1770

Howe's squabbles with local political and militia leaders were not his sole difficulties. On August 30, 1778, Howe engaged in a pistol duel with Christopher Gadsden of South Carolina over an offense Gadsden perceived stemming from his resignation in 1777 while under Howe's command. This controversy, like many in which Howe was involved, centered on the conflict between the Continental Army and state governments' desires to retain local control over their officers and soldiers. Gadsden responded to the perceived offense by drafting and circulating a letter attacking Howe's intelligence and ability as a commander and questioning Howe's legal authority to issue orders to South Carolina Continentals. Howe took offense and demanded satisfaction from Gadsden on August 17, 1778.

During the duel, Colonel Charles Pinckney, father of South Carolina Governor Charles Pinckney, served as Howe's second, while Colonel Barnard Elliot served as second to Gadsden. Howe, shooting first, missed his shot at eight paces, although the ball grazed Gadsden's ear. Gadsden then intentionally fired above his own left shoulder and demanded Howe fire again, a demand Howe refused. At the conclusion of the duel, the participants made amends and parted ways. The affair did not end privately, as the South Carolinian and American Gazette published a full story covering the duel on September 3, 1778, and in the same month, the ill-fated Major John André, the British officer who would later serve as a facilitator for Benedict Arnold's change of allegiance, published an 18-stanza satirical poem about the duel set to the tune of Yankee Doodle.

=== Removal from command and the Battle of Savannah, 1778 ===
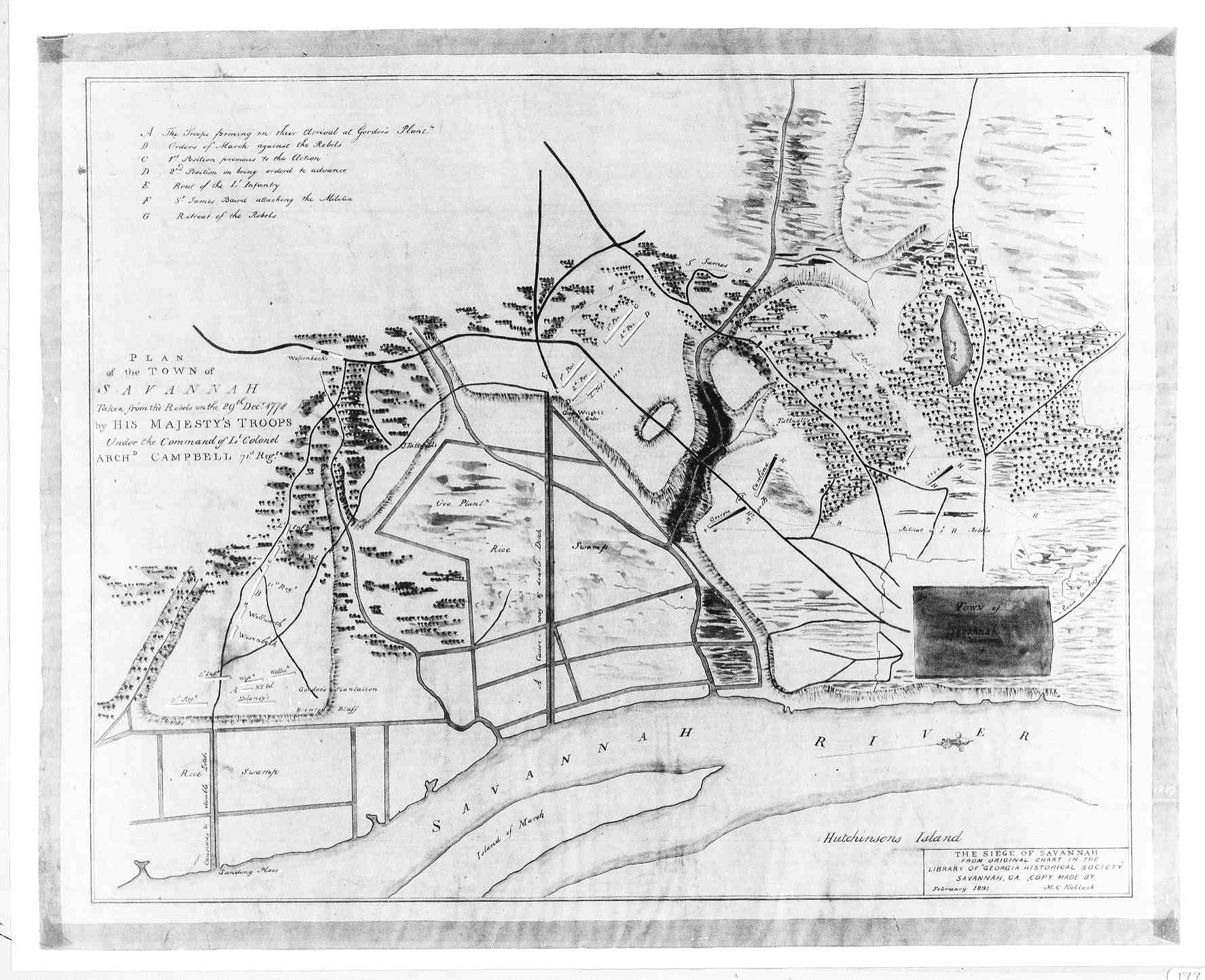
An 1891 copy of a 1778 map depicting the First Battle of Savannah

After allegations circulated in South Carolina about Howe's dalliances with a woman, the Continental Congress finally removed him from command of the Southern Department on September 25, 1778, replacing him with Major General Benjamin Lincoln. Howe remained with the Southern army and commanded it from Savannah. While awaiting Lincoln's arrival in Savannah with reinforcements, Howe set up defenses around that city, preparing for an imminent attack. Governor Houstoun sparred again with Howe, refusing to grant him more than meager militia support.

During the British capture of Savannah on December 29, 1778, an invasion force under Lieutenant-colonel Archibald Campbell landed near the city and flanked Howe's army, which was drawn up in the open for battle, by taking a path through a marshy area Howe believed was impassable. Howe had previously ordered a scout to look for any paths through the swamp, but Campbell's route, which was shown to him by a slave, remained unknown to the Patriots. Howe's position was otherwise strong and defensible, but the appearance of British troops in the Patriot rear caused a panic. The militia under Howe's command fled instantly, and more than 500 Patriots and Continental Army soldiers were killed or captured. The ensuing defeat gave Savannah to the British, for which Howe received much blame. On January 3, 1779, Howe formally relinquished his command to Lincoln.

Howe's failure at Savannah led to criticism from Georgia state officials, who believed he had abandoned the state to the British, as well as from fellow Continental Army generals, such as William Moultrie, who criticized Howe for even attempting to resist the British while being so greatly outnumbered. During his testimony before a later court–martial, Howe claimed that he knew about the pathway through the swamp taken by the British, but stated that he did not defend it because he believed the chance of an attack along the path was "so remote". This contradicted earlier testimony from Georgia militia officer George Walton, who stated that Howe did not know about the path prior to the battle and that Howe told Walton that he was mistaken in believing a path through the swamps existed.

=== Hudson Valley and Connecticut, 1779 ===
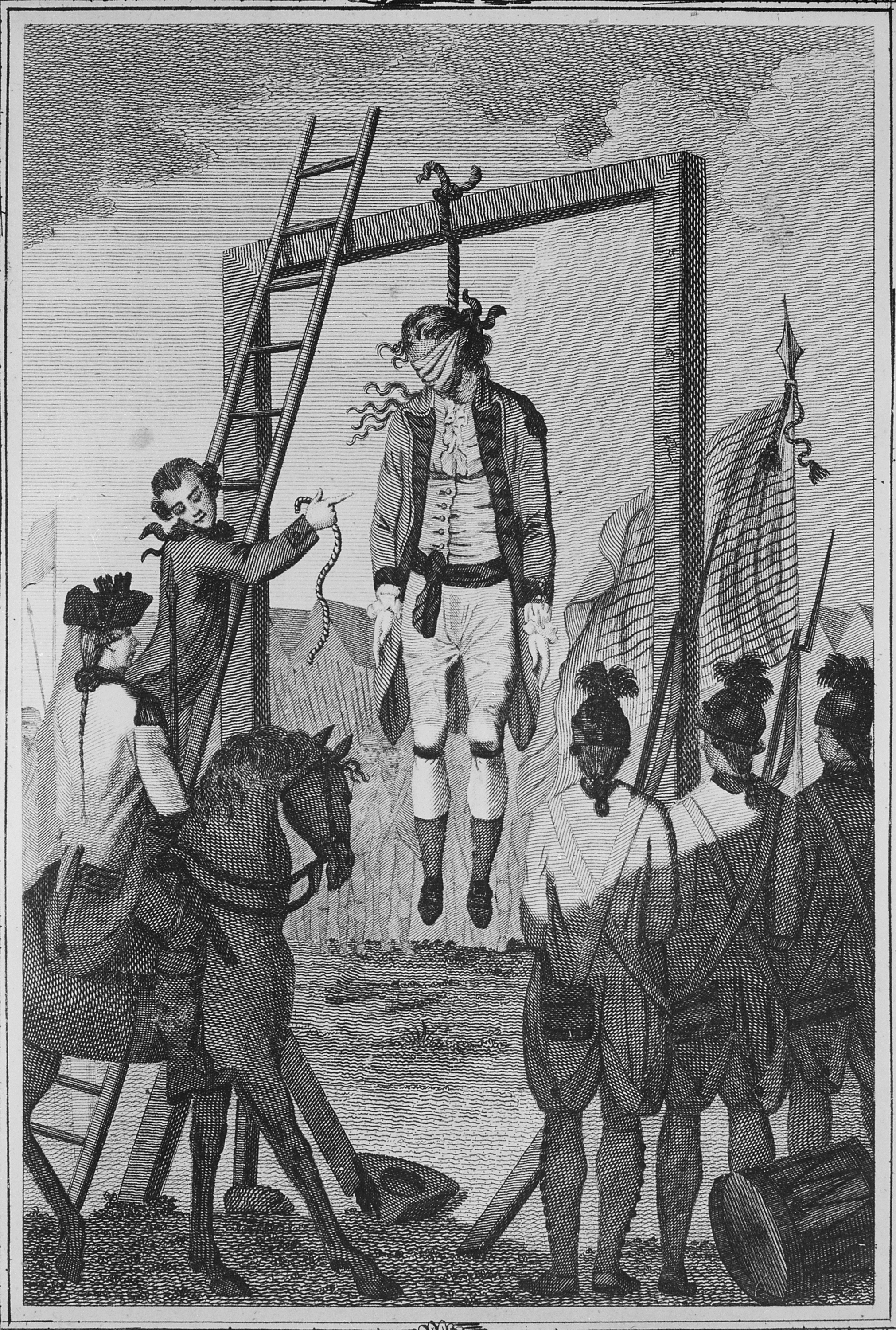
The execution of John André after Howe and other senior officers found him guilty of espionage

After Lincoln's arrival, Howe was ordered to join the Continental Army in the North, which he rejoined on May 19, 1779. Suffering from injuries caused by a fall, Howe was unable to undertake any duties for a month after his arrival. Initially, Howe was charged with defending Connecticut from British raids, such as those conducted by his former mentor, William Tryon, and Tryon's adjutant, Edmund Fanning. Howe's headquarters were in Ridgefield, Connecticut.

On June 18, 1779, shortly after the Battle of Stony Point, Howe was ordered to assist General Israel Putnam in assaulting a British fortification at Verplanck's Point, which sat across the Hudson River from Stony Point. Howe was charged with commanding the artillery barrage and infantry assault of that position, but was given too few field pieces, entrenching tools, provisions, and little ammunition to make a serious attempt at taking the fortification. He advised Washington that an assault would be unfeasible and called off the siege with Washington's consent. Historians have noted that Howe's inability to take the British fortifications damaged his career and that he was never again given a major command. Contemporaries such as General William Irvine criticized Howe as "having a talent ... of finding many supposed obstructions, and barely plausible pretences for his delay" in assaulting Verplanck's Point.

After Stony Point, Howe was assigned first to the command of the left wing of Washington's army composed of Massachusetts brigades under Generals John Nixon and John Glover, with his command again in Ridgefield, Connecticut. While military action was infrequent in Howe's region of control, he was integral in the recruitment and cultivation of a substantial spy network which provided the Patriots with information about British positions on Manhattan and along the Long Island Sound.

=== West Point and Benedict Arnold conspiracy, 1779–1780 ===
As part of his command duties, Howe was chosen by Washington as president of the court–martial convened to determine the propriety of General Benedict Arnold's conduct while serving as the commandant of Philadelphia in 1778 and 1779. During that time, Arnold was alleged to have conducted business with British merchants and to have undertaken private business transactions that were inappropriate given his position, among other improprieties. The tribunal, which met at Howe's headquarters in Middletown, Connecticut, adjourned for several months due to a threatened British attack but reconvened in December 1779 and closed in January 1780. During the interlude in the fall of 1779, Howe was ordered by Washington to move into position to attack the British in conjunction with an expected combined French naval and land-based assault, although the French assault in New York never materialized. The court-martial rendered its decision on January 26, 1780, finding Arnold guilty of breaching the articles of war by permitting a vessel from an enemy port into Philadelphia and recommended that he be reprimanded by Washington.

Howe was made commandant of the Continental Army fortifications at West Point on February 21, 1780. He held that command immediately prior to Benedict Arnold's conspiracy to turn over control of that stronghold to the British. Arnold and several supporters in Congress had eventually convinced Washington to give him command of the fortifications on August 3, 1780. Howe remained active in the upper Hudson River valley during the remainder of the war, particularly in overseeing his network of spies in the area, including double agent Joshua Hett Smith, who would later play a key role in Arnold's treason and prosecution. During this time, evidence arose implicating Howe in discussions with the British, though the evidence was dismissed by Washington as merely rumors stirred up by British General Henry Clinton. Howe served on the court-martial board that convicted of espionage and sentenced to death Major John André, the British officer tasked with facilitating Arnold's conspiracy.

=== Pennsylvania mutinies and war's end, 1781–1783 ===
In 1781, Howe assisted in putting down the Pompton Mutiny in New Jersey, which was inspired by the slightly earlier Pennsylvania Line Mutiny. Washington ordered Howe to surround the camp and arrange for the court-martial and execution of two of its ringleaders. In the fall of 1781, Howe requested permission to go with Washington to Virginia for what was anticipated to be the final campaign against the British, but Washington refused. Instead, Howe was required to appear before a court–martial in Philadelphia which was opened to inquire into Howe's actions in the defense of Savannah in 1778. The tribunal, led by Friedrich Wilhelm von Steuben, opened on December 7, 1781, and closed on January 23, 1782, acquitting Howe of any wrongdoing at Savannah with "the Highest Honor". Assistant Adjutant General John Carlisle ordered Howe to convene a court–martial to investigate the conduct of General Alexander McDougall in the spring of 1782. McDougall was a personal friend of Howe's, but the tribunal convicted him of the minor offense of releasing confidential details from a council of war meeting in 1776 to persons who were not permitted to have such information. Again in 1783, Howe was called on to put down the Pennsylvania Mutiny of 1783, which had caused the Continental Congress to flee Philadelphia.

== Post-war career and death ==
After putting down the second Pennsylvania mutiny in 1783, Howe participated in the establishment of the Society of the Cincinnati and was the second officer to sign the national charter, with his signature appearing directly below that of von Steuben. Howe thereafter returned to his North Carolina plantation, Kendal, which was upriver from the more famous Orton Plantation owned by Howe's distant relatives. Also in 1783, Howe became a founding member of the North Carolina Society of the Cincinnati and was a signatory to its "Institution" or charter. During much of 1783 and 1784, Howe returned frequently to Philadelphia, New York, and other cities in the northeast in an attempt to settle accounts and obtain back payments he claimed he was owed by Congress. He was again forced to mortgage his plantation but eventually received a monetary settlement from Congress of $7,000 in 1785.

During 1785, Howe was appointed by the Congress of the Confederation to establish treaties with several western Indian tribes but did not actually travel with commissioners George Rogers Clark, Richard Butler, and Samuel Holden Parsons, who finalized the Treaty of Fort Finney without Howe in 1786. Howe assisted Benjamin Smith in planning for the construction of Bald Head Light and actively worked to assist former Loyalists who sought to return to their prior lives in North Carolina by defending them against the judiciary of the state.

In the summer of 1786, he was elected a member of the North Carolina House of Commons. On his way to a meeting of the legislative body, Howe fell ill, and died on December 14, 1786, in Bladen County. Howe's remains were buried on property he owned in what later became Columbus County, North Carolina, although the exact location of his burial has not been discovered. A cenotaph was placed in Southport's Old Smithville Burying Ground honoring him and wife Sara.

== Legacy ==
Howe has been remembered primarily in a negative light based on his lack of military successes and reputation, although North Carolina historian Hugh Rankin noted in a biographical sketch that "his opportunities came at times when he did not have proper field strength to gain favorable recognition." During the 1903 session of the United States House of Representatives, Congressman John Dillard Bellamy introduced a bill to erect an equestrian statue of Howe in Wilmington in order to commemorate the general's service; this bill was not passed. In 1940, the State of North Carolina cast and erected a highway historical marker to commemorate Howe's service. The marker stands on North Carolina Highway 133 in Belville, North Carolina. The 1955 film The Scarlet Coat featured a performance by actor John McIntire as Howe during the height of the Benedict Arnold conspiracy.

=== Evidence of attempted treason ===
Several scholars have raised questions regarding Howe's actions as the unofficial spymaster of the Hudson Valley, all of which center on evidence that suggests Howe attempted to bargain with the British in exchange for a commission as an officer in the regular British Army, similar to the bargain struck by Benedict Arnold in 1780. As early as 1776, after Howe was appointed a brigadier general, a Loyalist merchant named Henry Kelly advised Secretary of State for the Colonies George Germain, 1st Viscount Sackville that Howe could be easily tempted to join the British, and further claimed that Howe could offer a great deal to the British in their war effort.

In 1780, after Benedict Arnold's attempted treason had been exposed, Captain Beesly Edgar Joel, a British defector and former officer in the British Army, claimed that another officer besides Arnold had attempted to defect, and after interrogation Joel named Howe as that officer. Joel cited Edmund Fanning, William Tryon's secretary, as the source for his information. Joel further described Howe's method of communicating with the British, which was by means of a frequently imprisoned-and-exchanged prisoner who would convey messages between the parties. While neither Washington or the Congressional Board of War believed Joel's story due to their suspicion of Joel as a British spy, Joel was later commissioned by Thomas Jefferson and the Virginia government to lead a Patriot militia unit against Loyalists in that state. Furthermore, William Smith, a New York Loyalist and the brother of Howe's agent and Arnold's co-conspirator Joshua Hett Smith, noted in his diary on April 29, 1780, that his brother, Thomas Smith, had been informed that a commissary had come over to the British with "information" from the Patriots in much the same manner as Joel had described. On September 28, 1780, William Smith told Henry Clinton that he believed "Bob" Howe would be willing to turn on the Patriots.

Later historians, including Douglas Southall Freeman, have frequently dismissed allegations that Howe attempted to defect, believing them to have been fabrications used by Joel to ingratiate himself with the Patriot government. The only full-length book treatment of Howe's life discusses the allegations of attempted treason in a single page. On the other hand, Freeman's judgment was based primarily on Washington's assessment of the allegations, but Washington did not have access to the potentially corroborating evidence in William Smith's diary. Another possibility is that Howe had merely attempted to spread word among the British of his possible treason in order to conceal his management of the vast spy network at his control; this tactic was utilized by other spymasters in Continental employ such as Philip Schuyler. Philip Ranlet, an American historian who studied Howe's career and motivations, has contrasted Schuyler's otherwise shining reputation with Howe's record of failures and draws the conclusion that Howe likely was attempting to defect. To date, no firm evidence exists which either absolves Howe or proves him guilty of attempted treason.
