= James Few =

American colonist

James Few was an American Regulator who was born in 1746 in Hartford (present-day Baltimore County, Maryland). His parents were William Few, Sr., and Mary Wheeler (James was their second-oldest son). James migrated with his parents and siblings to Orange County, North Carolina circa 1758.

Circa 1770, James married Sarah Wood in Orange County, North Carolina. They had twins, William and Sarah, who were born February 9, 1771.

James may have been a carpenter, but so far no primary source documents have come to light to prove that he was or that mentions his occupation.

James was executed west of Hillsborough, North Carolina on May 17, 1771, after taking part in the Battle of Alamance. He was executed by North Carolina militia troops while they were serving under North Carolina's royal Governor, William Tryon. James was hanged at the militia's camp approximately five miles northeast of the Alamance battlefield (as described by William Tryon in his orders book).

His children moved to Georgia with their grandparents after his death; his wife Sarah later remarried a Loyalist officer and moved to Greenwood County, South Carolina. It is unknown what happened to his body after he was executed; either his family members retrieved it (it took about one day to get to the campsite from their home east of Hillsborough at that time; the campsite was directly on the public road from Hillsborough to Salisbury, North Carolina, just after the ford over Great Alamance Creek) or he was unceremoniously buried at the campsite in an unmarked grave nearby by the militia troops that hanged him.

According to historical rumors, James's "fiancée" was seduced by Edmund Fanning, and James was the "sole support of his widowed mother." However, James was already married (to Sarah Wood) and had twins by her (William and Sarah), and his then 60- or 61-year-old mother lived with his father, William (who didn't pass away until 1794) on their farm near Hillsborough.

His brother, William Few, later became known for his service as an officer during the American Revolutionary War and as a politician in Georgia and New York.
