= Hugh Waddell (general) =

Irish-born military officer, merchant and politician (1734–1773)

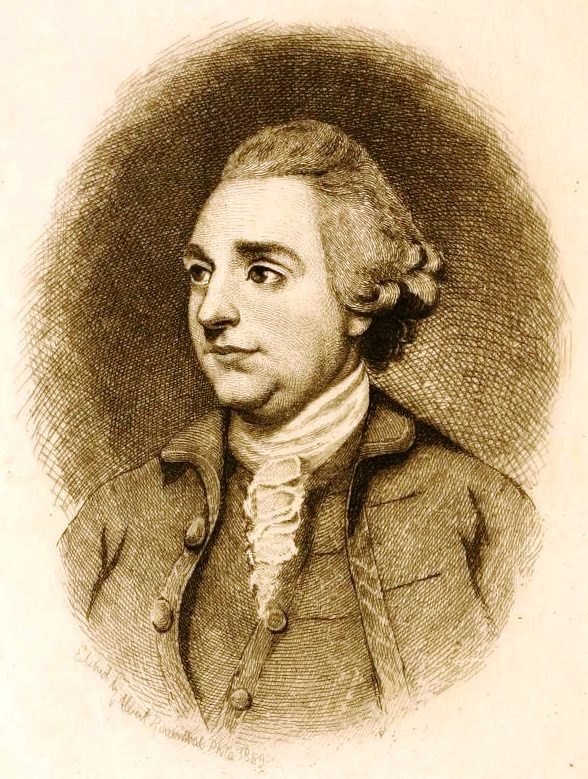
- Portrait of Waddell from Alfred Waddell's A Colonial Officer and His Times
- Born: c. 1734; Lisburn, County Down, Ireland
- Died: 9 April 1773 (aged 38–39); Castle Hayne, North Carolina
- Burial place: Castle Hayne, North Carolina
- Relatives: James Iredell Waddell, great-grandson Alfred Moore Waddell, third-great-grandson
- Military career
- Allegiance: North Carolina
- Branch: North Carolina Provincial Forces; North Carolina Militia
- Service years: 1754–1773
- Rank: General
- Conflicts: French and Indian War; Forbes Expedition; Fort Duquesne; Anglo-Cherokee War: Fort Dobbs; War of the Regulation

General Hugh Waddell (c. 1734 – 9 April 1773) was an Irish-born military officer, merchant, planter and politician who served in the French and Indian War. Waddell commanded provincial troops in Rowan County, North Carolina and the Ohio River Valley during the French and Indian War and Anglo-Cherokee War, along with supervising the construction of Fort Dobbs near the settlement of the Fourth Creek Congregation. His career was well-served by close connections to several provincial governors of North Carolina.

== Early life ==
Waddell was born c. 1734 in Lisburn, County Down, Ireland, to Hugh and Isabella Brown Waddell who were of Ulster Protestant origin, although the exact date of his birth is unknown. As a family friend to the aristocrat Arthur Dobbs of County Antrim, who had just been appointed as Governor of North Carolina, Waddell was sent to the colonies in 1753 or 1754, and enlisted in the service of the acting governor, Matthew Rowan, as a lieutenant.

== French and Indian War ==
An excerpt from the 1770 map of North Carolina by John Collet, depicting the location of Waddell's property on the northwest branch of the Cape Fear River

In 1754, Waddell was sent to Virginia under the command of Colonel James Innes, who was commander-in-chief of all colonial forces then in Virginia under the authority of the governor of that state, Robert Dinwiddie. After being promoted to captain, Waddell returned to North Carolina in late 1754. In the summer of 1755, he was given command of a company of 50 Provincial Soldiers sent to the frontier to defend the colony from attacks by French-allied Native Americans. He and his men began constructing Fort Dobbs in about December of 1755, near what is now Statesville, North Carolina. In February, 1756, Waddell joined two Virginia delegates and a Mohawk Indian to serve as a "Commissioner of Peace" to the Cherokee and Catawba tribes. Waddell was the sole representative of North Carolina in these negotiations, which secured the temporary cooperation of those tribes against the French and their native allies.

In 1758, Waddell promoted to major and sent to Pennsylvania with 300 men to assist with Brigadier-general John Forbes' campaign against Fort Duquesne. Waddell's men arrived without uniforms or weapons. They were initially used for road construction, but by August, his men began to be trained by Cherokee and Catawba allies. Eventually, part of Waddell's corps were dressing like their Native allies, and active in scouting the French positions. Sgt John Rogers was credited with capturing the only French-allied Native warrior taken in the whole campaign.

On 12 November 1758, Forbes ordered Colonel George Washington to command a force of Virginian and Carolinian troops to assault Fort Duquesne. Over the course of four days, Waddell and his troops fought off advanced groups of native French-allied warriors. By 24 November 1758, Waddell and his scouting force arrived to find that Fort Duquesne had been destroyed by the fleeing French soldiers, who had decided to abandon the fort in the face of the Forbes Expedition's methodical attack. After the conclusion of the Forbes Expedition, returned to North Carolina and was rewarded with a Colonel's Commission.

== Anglo-Cherokee War ==
Waddell, by now a colonel, was stationed at Fort Dobbs on the night of 27 February 1760 when a force of Cherokee attacked the blockhouse. In the ensuing battle, which was the only battle that occurred at Fort Dobbs, between 10 and 12 Cherokee and two provincial soldiers were wounded.

== War of the Regulation ==
After the Treaty of Paris, Waddell led provincial militia in support of Governor William Tryon and therefore against the "Regulation" movement during the War of the Regulation, although he did not take part in the Battle of Alamance due to having been encircled by Regulator militia near Salisbury, North Carolina. In 1771, Tryon promoted Waddell to the rank of general, the only such instance in colonial North Carolina. Governor Tryon's march westward to confront the Regulators was, in part, due to his desire to lift the siege on Waddell.

== Later life, death, and legacy ==
Waddell served at various times in the North Carolina Legislature representing Rowan County, although his primary residences were in Bladen County and Brunswick County. During his time in North Carolina, he acquired ownership over slave plantations. Despite his prior allegiances to Governors Dobbs and Tryon, Waddell was passed over for an appointment to North Carolina's Governor's Council, the primary advisory body to the colonial Governor. During this time, Waddell assisted in the establishment of a Sons of Liberty organization based around the Wilmington area, and participated in protests against the Stamp Act of 1765. Waddell died after a prolonged battle with an illness on 9 April 1773, in Castle Hayne, North Carolina where he is buried.

General Waddell was an ancestor of James Iredell Waddell, a Confederate captain during the Civil War, as well as Alfred Moore Waddell, a United States Congressman from North Carolina who wrote and published a biography of Waddell in 1890. In his biography, Alfred Waddell noted that Waddell had served longer in the military service of the crown than any other officer of the province, and as such was its most prominent soldier.

== Notes and references ==
- Branch, Paul (2006). "Fort Dobbs". In Powell, William S (ed.). Encyclopedia of North Carolina. Chapel Hill, NC: University of North Carolina Press. ISBN 978-0-8078-3071-0.
- Brown, John H., ed. (1903). "Waddell, Hugh". Lamb's biographical dictionary of the United States. Vol. 7. Boston: Federal Book Co. OCLC 2379256.
- Cashion, Jerry C. (1996). "Waddell, Hugh". In Powell, William S (ed.). Dictionary of North Carolina Biography. Vol. 6 (T–Z). Chapel Hill, NC: University of North Carolina Press. ISBN 978-0-8078-6699-3.
- Kars, Marjoleine. (2002). Breaking Loose Together: The Regulator Rebellion in Pre-Revolutionary North Carolina. Chapel Hill, NC: University of North Carolina Press. ISBN 978-0-8078-4999-6.
- Lefler, Hugh T.; Powell, William S. (1973). Colonial North Carolina: A History. New York: Charles Scribner's Sons. ISBN 0-684-13536-1.
- Lewis, J.D. "Hugh Waddell". The American Revolution in North Carolina.
- Morton, Patrick (10 September 2010). "French and Indian War". NCpedia.
- Ramsey, Robert (1964). Carolina Cradle: Settlement of the Northwest Carolina Frontier, 1747–1762. Chapel Hill, NC: University of North Carolina Press. ISBN 978-0-8078-4189-1.
- Waddell, Alfred (1890). A Colonial Officer and His Times, 1754–1773: A Biographical Sketch of Hugh Waddell. Raleigh, NC: Edwards & Broughton Co. OCLC 16153240.
