= Regulator Movement in North Carolina =

1766–1771 conflict in North Carolina

Regulator Movement
- Governor Tryon and the Regulators, engraving by F. O. C. Darley, 1877
Date	1766–1771
Location	Western frontiers of North Carolina (present-day Central North Carolina)
Result	British victory

Belligerents
Great Britain	Regulators

Commanders and leaders
(Kingdom of Great Britain) William Tryon: Hugh Waddell	Herman Husband; Harmon Cox (POW); Benjamin Merrill (POW) (executed); James Few (POW) (executed); James Hunter

Strength
~150 regulars ~1,000 provincials	~2,300 regulators

The Regulator Movement in North Carolina, also known as the Regulator Insurrection, War of Regulation, War of the Regulation, and Regulator Revolution, was an uprising in Provincial North Carolina from 1766 to 1771 in which citizens took up arms against colonial officials whom they viewed as corrupt. Historians such as John Spencer Bassett argue that the Regulators did not wish to change the form or principle of their government, but simply wanted to make the colony's political process more equal. They wanted better economic conditions for everyone, instead of a system that heavily benefited the colonial officials and their network of plantation owners mainly near the coast. Bassett interprets the events of the late 1760s in Orange and surrounding counties as "...a peasants' rising, a popular upheaval."

== Background ==
The western region of Provincial North Carolina experienced dramatic population growth in the 1760s. Thousands of colonists arrived from the eastern districts seeking greater opportunities. The inland section of the colonies had once been predominantly composed of planters with an agricultural economy. Merchants and lawyers began to move west, upsetting the social and political structure. They were joined by new Scots-Irish immigrants, who populated the backcountry.

At the same time, the local inland agricultural community suffered from a deep economic depression because of severe droughts throughout the previous decade. The loss of crops cost farmers their food source as well as their primary means of income, which led many to rely on the goods being brought by newly arrived merchants. Due to income loss, the local planters often fell into debt. The merchants, in turn, relied on lawyers and the court to settle disputes. Debts were common at the time, and from 1755 to 1765, the cases brought to the docket increased nearly sixteen-fold, from seven annually to 111 in Orange County, North Carolina, alone.

Such court cases could often lead to planters losing their homes and property, so they grew to resent the presence of the newcomers. The shift in population and politics eventually led to an imbalance within the colony's courthouses, and the new and well-educated lawyers used their superior knowledge of the law to their sometimes unjust advantage. A small clique of wealthy officials formed an exclusive inner circle in charge of the legal affairs of the area. The group was seen as a "courthouse ring" made up of officials who grabbed most of the political power for themselves. The abuse of the justice system was exacerbated by the tax-collecting local sheriffs supported by the courts. In many cases, the sheriffs and the courts held sole control over their local regions. Historian William S. Powell writes that these local officials were perceived to be "unjust and dishonest", having engaged in extortion, embezzlement, and other schemes to benefit themselves.

One early protest was the Nutbush Address, given by George Sims on June 6, 1765. George was from Nutbush (later Williamsboro, North Carolina). This address was a protest about provincial and county officials and the fees they charged residents of Granville County. This later led to the "Regulator Movement" in North Carolina.

There were several different publications and petitions circulated to promote the end of taxation and other issues. A number of influential members of the area communities signed the Regulator Advertisement and the Regulator Petition, of which there were several versions of each. Each document identified concerns and issues relevant to the Regulator Movement. The terms Regulation and Regulator were introduced in the Regulator Advertisement in 1768.

== Prelude ==
In 1764, several thousand people from North Carolina, mainly from Orange, Granville, and Anson counties in the western region, were dissatisfied with the wealthy North Carolina officials, whom they considered cruel, arbitrary, tyrannical and corrupt. With the arrival of Royal Governor William Tryon in 1765, volatile conditions in North Carolina increasingly worsened. Many of the officers were greedy and often would band together with other local officials for their own personal gain. The entire system depended on the integrity of local officials, many of whom engaged in extortion; taxes collected often enriched the tax collectors directly. The system was endorsed by Governor Tryon, who feared losing the support of the various county officials.

The effort to eliminate the system of government became known as the Regulator Uprising, War of the Regulation, or the Regulator War. The most heavily affected areas were said to be those of Rowan, Anson, Orange, Granville, Cumberland, and Dobbs counties. It was a struggle between mostly lower-class citizens, who made up the majority of the backcountry population of North and South Carolina, and the wealthy planter elite, who composed about 5% of the population but maintained almost total control of the government.

The stated primary aim of the Regulators was to form an honest government and reduce taxation. The wealthy businessmen/politicians who ruled North Carolina saw it as a threat to their power. Ultimately, they brought in the militia to crush the rebellion and hanged its leaders. It is estimated that out of the 8,000 people living in Orange County at the time, some 6,000 to 7,000 supported the Regulators.

== Opposing forces ==
=== Regulators ===
Herman Husband became one of the unofficial leaders of the Regulators. Husband was from Maryland, born into a Quaker family. One of the major flaws in Husband's campaign was he tried to invite good relations with the eastern regions of North Carolina, mostly unaffected by the issues with local sheriffs. Husband retained very little control over the Regulators, who generally went against his policies of winning over public sentiment and committed acts of minor violence at regular intervals. His actions were seen by many to be too peaceful and not actionable enough for real change.

Unlike Herman Husband, his first cousin from the same Quaker family, Harmon Cox had a more confrontational approach, opting to choose a path of resistance, armed opposition, and open defiance. Cox organized regulators in Randolph County, North Carolina, held meetings at his house/mill, and used his money and social standing to better organize, supply, and fund resistance to British imposed taxes and unjust actions. Harmon Cox was not initially seen by William Tryon as a leader in the same caliber as his cousin, Herman Husband. This allowed Cox to be spared from the gallows in Hillsboro, North Carolina and return home.

Another Regulator leader was James Hunter. He refused to take command of the Regulators after Husband's departure before the Battle of Alamance. Captain Benjamin Merrill had about 300 men under his control and would have assumed control over military leadership after James Hunter, but he was unable to serve in the Battle of Alamance.

=== Provincials ===
Governor Arthur Dobbs, who wrote such popular works as Trade and Improvement of H'elend and Captain Middleton's Defense, served as the Royal Governor of North Carolina until his death in 1765. William Tryon succeeded him. Tryon had a lavish home built in 1770 in New Bern. This was resented by the Regulators, who were already paying substantial taxes. William (The Regulator) Butler was quoted as saying, "We are determined not to pay the Tax for the next three years, for the Edifice or Governor's House, nor will we pay for it."

Governor Josiah Martin succeeded Governor Tryon in office just after the end of the rebellion. His policies eased the burden on former Regulators and allowed them to be assimilated back into society. Edmund Fanning was the main opposition to the Regulators. A graduate of Yale College, he was generally regarded by his friends as well-disciplined and firm. He held many political offices in Orange County. He was once found guilty of embezzling money (along with Francis Nash) but was fined only one penny per charge.

== History ==
=== Breaking up the provincial court ===
North Carolina's colonial court met in Hillsborough. On September 24, 1770, the Regulators entered Hillsborough, broke up the court, and dragged those they saw as corrupt officials through the streets. The mob attempted to have the judge try the cases that were pending against several Regulator leaders, including Husband. The presiding Judge Richard Henderson quickly adjourned the court until the next morning to avoid being forced to make a ruling in the presence of an angry mob of Regulators, and escaped in the night. The Regulators rioted, destroying public and private property alike. Fanning was among the lawyers beaten, found after taking refuge in a shop neighboring the courthouse. According to Judge Henderson, Fanning's beating was so severe that "one of his eyes was almost beaten out." The courthouse was systematically and symbolically vandalized. Human waste was placed on the judge's seat, and the body of a long deceased slave was placed upon the lawyers' bar. The mob continued to destroy shops and property in the town, and ultimately brought their destruction to Fanning's personal residence. After destroying all of the furniture and drinking all of his alcohol, they picked apart his entire house. Henderson's barn, along with his stables and home, were burned to the ground. They cracked the church bell of the Church of England but stopped short of looting the church.

=== Expedition against the insurgents ===
While small acts of violence had been taking place for some time, mainly out of resentment, the first organized conflict was in Mecklenburg County in 1765. Settlers in the region, who were there illegally, forced away surveyors of the region assigned with designating land. Minor clashes followed for the next several years in almost every western county, but the only true battle of the movement was the Battle of Alamance on May 16, 1771.

Governor Tryon and his forces, which numbered just over 1,000, with roughly 150 officers, arrived at Hillsborough on May 9, 1771. At the same time, General Hugh Waddell, supporting the governor, en route with a contingent of 236 militia, was met by a large contingent of Regulators under the leadership of Captain Benjamin Merrill. Realizing his force was outnumbered, he fell back to Salisbury. Two days later, on May 11, 1771, having received word of the retreat from a messenger, Tryon sent the force to support General Waddell. He intentionally chose a path which would lead his forces through Regulator territory. By May 14, 1771, his militia troops had reached Alamance and set up camp. Leaving about 70 men behind to guard the position, he moved the remainder of his force, slightly under 1,000 men and 8 cannons, to find the Regulators.

About 10 miles (16 km) away, a force of approximately 2,000 Regulators (by some accounts, 6,000), was gathered mainly as a display of force and not a standing army. The general Regulator strategy was to scare the governor with a show of superior numbers in order to force the governor to give in to their demands. On May 16, 1771, along the Salisbury-Hillsborough Road Tryon met the Regulators with 1,000 men and 8 cannons. After ordering them to disperse and waiting for an hour they opened fire with cannons and muskets on to the crowd. The battle lasted 2 hours and involved 1% of the North Carolinian population at the time and most of its prominent people. The battle was over with nine deaths for the governor's forces and about 100 killed and 200 wounded on the Regulator side. James Few was a regulator who had personally wounded Tryon at the battle, he was captured and executed the day after the battle. Afterwards Tryon conducted a campaign of terror against the population and hanged outlaw Regulators, burned people's homes, and forced oaths out of the population. Six Regulators were rapidly tried and hanged for their part in the uprising in Hillsboro, North Carolina. Harmon Cox, was among the few spared by William Tryon, as a show of good faith.

== Aftermath ==
Following the battle, Tryon's militia army traveled through Regulator territory, where he had Regulators and Regulator sympathizers sign loyalty oaths and destroyed the properties of the most active Regulators. He also raised taxes to pay for his militia's defeat of the Regulators.

At the time of their defeat at Alamance, public opinion was decidedly against the Regulators. Harmon Cox, upon his release after the battle, had his property searched and useful war material seized by British militia. The regulators were now seen as "lawless desperadoes," and Governor Tryon was praised for his actions in stamping out the rebellion. As news articles spread the word of his victory, Tryon was branded a hero of the colonies for defeating the larger group of Regulators with his small, well prepared militia. However, as the initial excitement over the battle died down, many newsmen, especially in the Boston area, began to question the reasons behind the rebellion and investigated further. Several reasons were found to regard the destruction of the Regulators as an act of an oppressive government. Most particularly admonished were the methods Tryon had used to win the battle. The use of a riot act and the execution of rebellion leaders after the battle was frowned upon. Reports also indicated that battlefield misconduct had taken place on the governor's side, including giving the farmers a one-hour warning period before the battle began, and subsequently breaking that agreement to bombard them with artillery fire.

Despite the government's victory over the militia, the rule of law continued to languish in western North Carolina in years after the battle at Alamance. Records indicate the district court in Salisbury ceased to convene after 1770 and the court in Hillsborough only met twice in 1772 and never thereafter. Many of the main leaders remained in hiding until 1772, when they were no longer considered outlaws. Many Regulators moved further west into places such as Tennessee, notably establishing both the Watauga Association in 1772 and the State of Franklin in 1784. There is a popular belief that most of the Regulators went on to become Loyalists during the American Revolutionary War, however documentary evidence shows that only 34 of the 883 known Regulators were Tories (Loyalists), compared to 289 Whigs (Patriots) and 560 of unknown Revolutionary allegiance.

== In popular culture ==
- The Regulators are featured as important characters in Jimmy Carter's historical novel The Hornet's Nest (2003).
- Diana Gabaldon features the Battle of Alamance as a significant event in her historical time-travel novel The Fiery Cross, the fifth book in the Outlander series. The battle was featured in the 7th episode of Season 5 of Outlander (TV series).
- The Regulator is a song by the musical group The Gravy Boys based in the Raleigh/Durham Triangle area, from their 2019 album Bring It Down, which highlights the Regulator Movement in North Carolina in the late 1700s.
