= Herman Husband =

Farmer, radical, pamphleteer, author, and preacher

- Born: December 3, 1724; Cecil County, Maryland
- Died: June 19, 1795 (aged 70); Philadelphia County, Pennsylvania
- Resting place: Unknown
- Occupations: Farmer, pamphleteer, author, preacher
- Movement: Regulator Movement, Whiskey Rebellion
- Spouse(s): Else Phoebe Cox, Mary Pugh, Emey Allen
- Children: 8

Herman Husband (December 3, 1724 – June 19, 1795) was an American farmer, pamphleteer, author, and preacher best known as a leader of the Regulator Movement, a populist rebellion in the Province of North Carolina in the years leading up to the American Revolutionary War. Husband was twice elected to the North Carolina assembly but was expelled during his second term.

== Early life ==
Husband was born on December 3, 1724, in Cecil County, Maryland, to William Husband and Mary Kinkey/Kankey. He was likely named after his maternal grandfather, Herman Kankey. Herman was raised as an Anglican. His paternal grandfather William Husband's family came from England, and were originally indentured servants, who later turned to being land owners and slave owners. His mother's side of the family (Kankeys) came from Hamburg in Germany, and his maternal grandfather Herman Kankey was a religious tavern keeper who also was a critic of slavery.

One of the many to be inspired to the Great Awakening after hearing George Whitefield preach, he became a "New Light" Presbyterian and then a Quaker.

== Affiliation with Benjamin Franklin ==
Moving to Loves Creek in what is now Siler City, North Carolina and later to Sandy Creek in what is now Randolph County in the 1750s, Husband established himself as a farmer and religious leader. He was later asked to leave the Quaker Meeting and he did so but continued to follow many of their tenets including strict pacifism. Philosophically he was drawn to the wisdom of Ben Franklin. Husband and Franklin kept up a correspondence through John Willcox, a merchant of Cross Creek, now Fayetteville, North Carolina, who went to Philadelphia, Pennsylvania, twice annually to purchase goods. John Willcox was the son of Thomas Willcox whose paper mill in Concord Township, Delaware County, Pennsylvania, manufactured paper used by Benjamin Franklin for his publications. Husband was thus in receipt of political pamphlets of a patriotic nature which he reprinted and circulated among his fellow citizens.

== Regulator Rebellion ==
In the 1760s, he was involved in the resistance to the corrupt practices of predatory government officials- mainly the lawyers and judges. He was elected to the colony's assembly and spoke out against governmental abuses. His story is reminiscent of that of John Wilkes. He was jailed for speaking out and then set loose when an angry mob of armed backwoods farmers was coming to free him. The resisters organized and began calling themselves "Regulators" because they wanted to regulate the government, that is- to force it to obey the laws. Thus the movement is known as the Regulator Rebellion. Mob action was taken to prevent the worst abuses of the courts.

Husband always denied he was a Regulator, and indeed, as a pacifist, he wouldn't take part in violence or threats of violence. But he was a spokesman and a symbol for the resistance. He had several tracts printed the best-known being "Shew Yourselves to be Freemen" (1769), "An Impartial Relation of the First and Causes of the Recent Differences in Public Affairs" (1770), and "A Fan For Fanning And A Touchstone For Tryon" (1771). In 1770, Husband was expelled from the state legislature, ostensibly for libel but most likely due to his affiliation with the Regulators.

When the officers of Rowan County, North Carolina, agreed to decide the dispute between themselves and the Regulators through a committee of arbitration, Husband was selected to serve on the committee.

Husband accompanied the Regulators on the morning of the Battle of Alamance (May 16, 1771) and sought to bring about an adjustment. Seeing this was impossible, he mounted his horse and rode away, his Quaker principles dictating that he avoid participation in a fight.

A small powderhorn used by Husband's cousin, Harmon Cox, at the Battle of Alamance and later carried by Husband when he fled to Somerset County, Pennsylvania, was donated to the Alamance Battlefield North Carolina State Historical Site by a descendant, Nick Sheedy, in 2008.

After the "rebellion" was crushed at the Battle of Alamance, Husband fled to Maryland under the name "Tuscape Death" and later called himself "Old Quaker". He only openly reclaimed his own name after the American Revolution.

Husband continued his journeys both physical and metaphysical eventually settling in an area known as "The Glades" in what was then Bedford County and later became part of Somerset County in Western Pennsylvania and becoming a millennial preacher as well as a political reformer. He called for progressive taxation, paper money, and, as a proponent of greater participation of common people in government as well as in religion, more democracy. In 1782 he released a pamphlet entitled "Proposals to Amend and Perfect the Policy of the Government of the United States of America" where he argued in favor of smaller legislative districts and legislatures for each county in order to maximize the influence of voters. For the first federal elections in 1788 Husband argued in favor of electing congressmen in districts instead of by the statewide method that was used.

== Whiskey Rebellion ==
His outspoken nature and reputation for radicalism drew him into the Whiskey Rebellion (1794), where he served as a delegate to the Parkinson’s Ferry and Redstone meetings attempting to moderate the violent resistance to the excise tax on whiskey championed by Treasury Secretary Alexander Hamilton. He is also associated with the raising of a liberty pole at Brunerstown (present-day Somerset, Pennsylvania) in the town square, adorned with an ensign proclaiming, "Liberty and No Excise".

When federal troops marched over the Allegheny Mountains, ostensibly to put down the revolt, they found no rioters but a lack of provisions which led them to thieve from local farmers, from which they acquired the ignominious name of the "Watermelon Army". The federal forces rounded up suspects, including Husband, who was specifically sought after. The detainees were held in miserable conditions and then marched back east for trial. He was tried for treason, but acquitted. Friends interceded to secure Husband's release.

== Death ==
After spending about six months in prison, at the age of 70, Herman Husband died about June 19, 1795, in a tavern outside Philadelphia, on his journey home. His health had deteriorated during his time in jail. His burial location is unknown. His descendant was US Navy Admiral Husband E. Kimmel.

== Sources ==
- Carney, Richard. "Herman Husband". North Carolina History Project. Archived from the original on March 13, 2016.
- "Shew Yourselves to be Freemen": Herman Husband and the North Carolina Regulators, 1769". History Matters.
- Hogeland, William. The Whiskey Rebellion: George Washington, Alexander Hamilton, and the Frontier Rebels Who Challenged America's Newfound Sovereignty. New York: Scribner, 2006. ISBN 0-7432-5490-2.
