= Battle of Alamance =

1771 battle of the Regulator Movement

- Part of the Regulator Movement
Date	May 16, 1771 (255 years ago)
Location	Orange County (present-day Alamance County), North Carolina 36°00′35.7″N 79°31′15.6″W
Result	British victory

Belligerents
Great Britain	Regulators

Commanders and leaders
(Kingdom of Great Britain) William Tryon: John Ashe; Robert Howe; Abner Nash; James Moore; Richard Caswell	Benjamin Merrill (POW); Harmon Cox (POW); James Few (POW)

Strength
5-6 regiments: ~150 regulars; ~1,000 provincials; 2 three pounders; 6 swivel guns	~1200 armed regulators ~1000 unarmed regulators

Casualties and losses
9-27 killed 61 wounded	100 killed ~200 wounded ~15 captured
- Location in North Carolina

The Battle of Alamance took place on May 16, 1771. It was the final confrontation of the Regulator Movement in colonial North Carolina. The rebellion was instigated because of various issues with the colonial government, and was primarily aimed at needed reforms to the Currency Act. Regulator supporters demanded other changes, including an end to the corruption of local politicians, a right to secret ballot voting, land reforms, and transparency in government. Named after the nearby Great Alamance Creek, the battle took place in what was then Orange County (and now located in Alamance County) in the Piedmont area, about 6 miles (9.7 km) south of present-day Burlington, North Carolina).

The government forces effectively crushed the regulator resistance with their better equipped and trained force, though much smaller in number. Immediately after the fighting, the government forces captured several of the regulator leaders including Benjamin Merrill and Harmon Cox. Regulator leader Herman Husband, as well as others, were not present for the battle itself, but had accompanied the regulators up until the battle took place before withdrawing. Several of Tryon's military leaders went on to be high-ranking officers and politicians in North Carolina, including John Ashe, Robert Howe, and Richard Caswell.

== Prelude ==
In the spring of 1771, North Carolina Governor William Tryon left New Bern, having mustered 1,000 militia troops and 8 cannons. They marched westwards to address an inunsugency that had been brewing in the western counties for several years. Herman Husband was the leader of the regulators in Orange County, and his first cousin Harmon Cox was the leader in Randolph County, they led their militia forces in the ensuing riots and battle, save for Herman Husband who was a devout Quaker and detested violence, he led men but left once the battle was sure to happen. The colonial government chose to act after a group of Regulators in September 1770 attacked the superior court in Hillsborough, NC.

They rioted through the town for several days. In response in January 1771 the North Carolina assembly passed the Johnston Riot Act, allowing the use of force to disperse assemblies of people. As a result of their acts of resistance, such as not paying fees and taxes, and minor violence, the Regulators were declared to be in a state of rebellion and insurrection.

About 2,200 Regulators had gathered, for an unknown reason, along the Sailsburg-Hillsborough road in an area where two hills are with a depression in-between. They might have assembled for a meeting as they had done before, or to finally make their stand against Tryon and fight, their true intentions are unknown. Funded with £6,000 provided by council member and wealthy merchant Samuel Cornell, Tryon left the county seat of Hillsborough, on May 11 with his militia to confront the Regulators, who had made camp south of Great Alamance Creek in western Orange County.

== Battle ==
On the evening of May 15, Tryon received word that the Regulators were camped about six miles away. Throughout the night, the Regulators sent peace envoys to discuss with Tryon to avoid fighting. All overtures were ignored. The next morning, at about 8:00 am, Tryon's troops, which consisted of much more disciplined, trained, and experienced soldiers such as John Ashe and James Moore, set out to a field about a half mile from the Regulators' camp. They were better equipped than the regulators, having supply wagons, gun wagons mounted with artillery pieces, and several mounted officers on horseback. While marching on the road he stopped and ordered his men to practice forming a line. After a satisfactory performance they reformed and marched down the road. As the army neared the Regulator positions he ordered the militia to form two lines, and divided his artillery with the 2 3-pounders on the flanks and the 6 swivel guns at the center. The Regulators waited for the army to arrive. On the eve of the battle, Herman Husband who opposed fighting left before shots began to be fired. Although seemingly disorganized, the regulators did possess a command structure. The Regulators were volunteers organized along community lines, with elected "chiefs" and "captains". Local leaders included Harmon Cox and Benjamin Merrill. Additionally, most of the Regulators did have militia training and knew how to fight. This being considered, it should also be known that less than half of the 2,200 regulators present at the battle, were armed, many showed up without weapons not thinking they would need any, and many carried blunt and sharp objects and weapons, which were almost all but pointless when dealing with cannons with grapeshot.

At about 11:00 Tryon sent one of his aides-de-camp, Captain Philemon Hawkins II, and the Sheriff of Orange County with a proclamation ahead of the advancing army to be read to the Regulators.

Alamance Camp, Thursday, May 16, 1771.

To Those Who Style Themselves "Regulators": In reply to your petition of yesterday, I am to acquaint you that I have ever been attentive to the interests of your County and to every individual residing therein. I lament the fatal necessity to which you have now reduced me by withdrawing yourselves from the mercy of the crown and from the laws of your country. To require you who are now assembled as Regulators, to quietly lay down your arms, to surrender up your leaders, to the laws of your country and rest on the leniency of the Government. By accepting these terms within one hour from the delivery of this dispatch, you will prevent an effusion of blood, as you are at this time in a state of rebellion against your King, your country, and your laws.

(Signed) William Tryon.

Depiction of Gov. Tryon on horseback, leading soldiers the against Regulator forces; engraving by A. Bollett Co.

This letter, as read by the sheriff of Orange county, made the demand to disperse per the Johnston Riot act. The Regulators had one hour to disperse or be subject to force. Soon after at about 11:15 Tryon's army arrived, formed along the slope of the adjacent hill, and proceeded to wait for the deadline with weapons loaded.

The Regulators spent the time yelling insults at the militia and taunting them to fire. Possibly during the hour or at the end, one Regulator who had been taken prisoner earlier in the day, Robert Thompson, decided to seize the moment to escape. Tryon ordered him to be shot. When the hour was up, Tryon sent over the Sheriff of Orange county to get the Regulators' answer, their response being "fire and be damned". Tryon gave the order to open fire with grapeshot from the cannons, followed by volleys from the militia.

The Regulators attempted to form a defense, but by the second volley most of the Regulators fled in terror. Those left behind took cover behind large trees and rocks and fired back. The artillery continued firing on the Regulators. After 30 minutes, Tryon ordered the cannons to cease fire, and for the militia to advance. They routed the remaining Regulators, chasing them for several miles, rounding up any left behind, and looting the Regulators camp to boot. The battle brought the Regulators movement to an end.

Michael Holt was politically active in the years of the Regulation and the Revolution. The Battle of Alamance was fought on his land in 1771. His role in the Revolution began as a Tory, raising and leading a militia company for the crown in 1776. Shortly thereafter, he had a change of sympathies and supported the Revolution for the remainder of the conflict.

== Aftermath ==
Postcard depiction of the Battle of Alamance, by J. Steeple Davis

Losses for both sides are disputed. Tryon reported nine dead and 61 wounded among the militia, with 300 Regulator casualties during the battle. Tryon took 13 prisoners. After the battle, Tryon sought to cement the fear and terror by beginning a campaign of terror on the population. One of the prisoners, named James Few, who had inflicted many casualties on Tryon, was executed at the camp the day after the battle. Tryon then proceeded to travel across the center of Regulators control, burning homes and destroying crops. The populace was compelled to sign oaths of allegiance and surrender their firearms. Afterwards the army returned to Hillsborough where a rapid trial was conducted for the remaining twelve prisoners. They were all sentenced to be hanged; six were pardoned at the last minute. The sentence was carried out on the remaining six on June 19, 1771, on a hill in the town of Hillsborough. After the battle and Tryon's campaign of terror many Regulators and the families traveled westward to areas beyond North Carolina. After the hangings Tryon left to become Governor of New York leaving a war torn North Carolina to his successor.

During the American Revolution, many prominent Regulators became Loyalists, like James Hunter who fought at the Battle of Moore's Creek Bridge. Alternatively, the leaders of Tryon's militia became the leaders of the Revolution. All of North Carolina's continental army generals were with Tryon at the Battle of Alamance, and one was in command of the artillery that fired on the Regulators. The Regulators notably were never against the monarchy - their issue was with local corruption and elites abusing them.

== Legacy ==
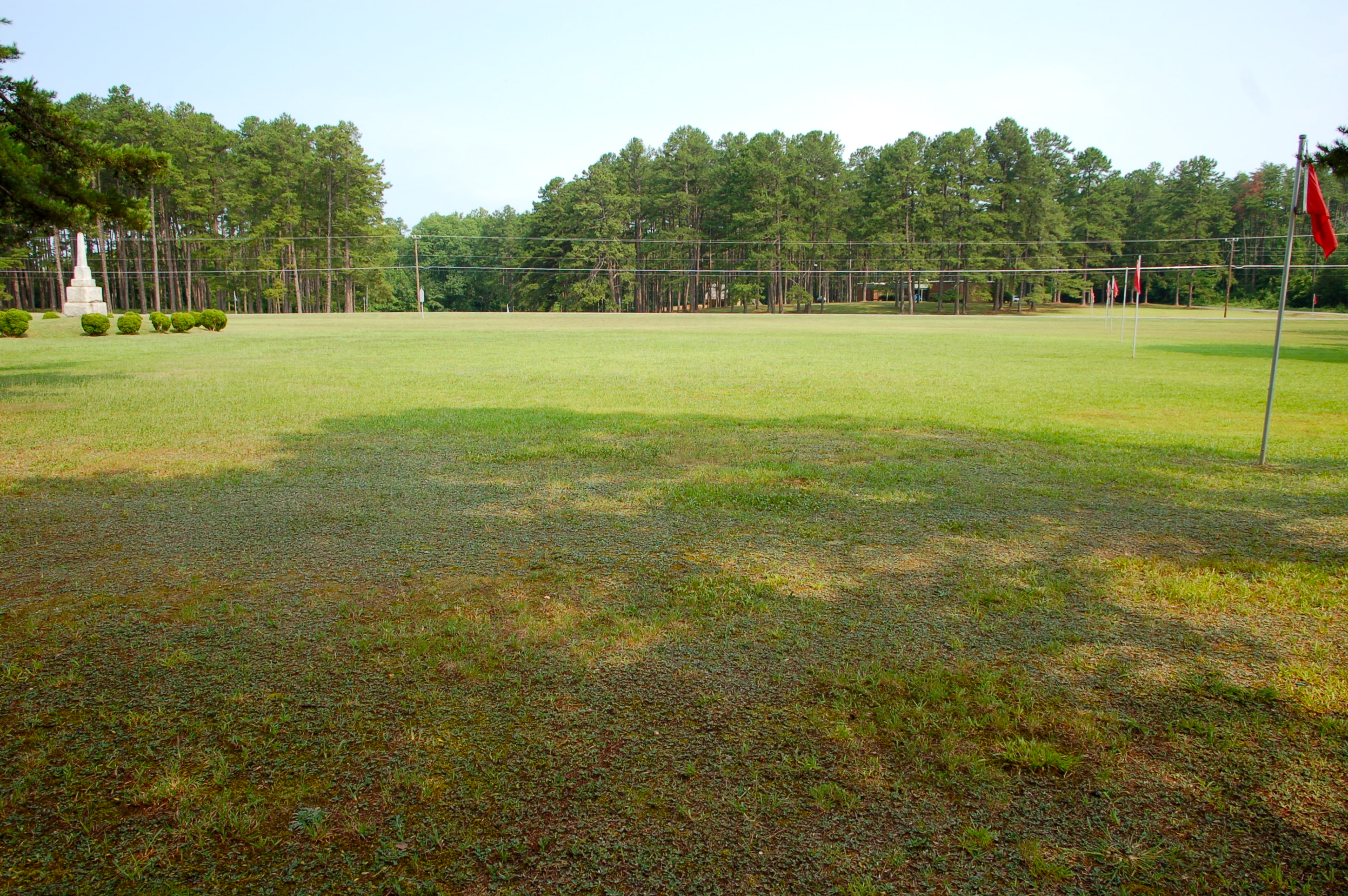
The site of the Battle of Alamance, including red flags, to the right, marking militia positions and an 1880 commemorative monument, in the distance, to the far left.

Some local historians in the late nineteenth and early twentieth centuries believed the battle to be a forerunner to the American Revolutionary War.

== In popular culture ==
The battle features in the Diana Gabaldon novel, The Fiery Cross, and is depicted in the television adaptation, Outlander, in the fifth season's episode "The Ballad of Roger Mac" which first aired in 2020; however, there are many historical inaccuracies.

== Battlefield preservation ==
The site of the Battle is preserved as Alamance Battleground State Historic Site where visitors may walk where the battle took place. Today the site contains exhibits, nature trails, a self-guided walking tour, guided battlefield tours, and a 1780s log cabin belong to the Allen family. The visitors' center offers exhibits, artifacts, and a gift shop. The site offers programing and events throughout the year including in May a Reenactment of the Battle of Alamance.

== Order of battle ==
=== North Carolina militia ===
According to Tryon's journal, the following soldiers served under his command:

- Major-generals: John Ashe and Thomas Lloyd
- Lieutenant-generals: John Rutherford, Lewis Henry deRosset, John Sampson, Robert Palmer, Benjamin Heron, and Samuel Strudwick
- Majors of brigade: Abner Nash and Robert Howe
- Colonels: Alexander Osborne, Edmund Fanning, Robert Harris, James Sampson, Samuel Spencer, James Moore, and Maurice Moore
- Lieutenant-colonels: John Frohock, Moses Alexander, Alexander Lillington, John Gray, Samuel Benton, and Robert Schaw
- Majors: William Bullock, Walter Lindsay, Thomas Lloyd, Martin Fifer, and John Hinton
- Alexander Lillington and James Moore were both American patriots at the Battle of Moore's Creek Bridge
- Richard Caswell was delegate to the Continental Congress in Philadelphia, one of the principal authors of the 1776 constitution of North Carolina, and the first governor of the newly independent state
- Francis Nash, whose guilt for extortion precipitated the Regulator Movement, fought and died as an American patriot in the Revolution
- Griffith Rutherford served as a brigadier general in Salisbury District Brigade of the North Carolina militia

=== Regulators ===
The following individuals were numbered as central members of the Regulators:

- Herman Husband - author and organizer of Orange County regulators
- Harmon Cox - financier and organizer of Randolph County regulators
- James Hunter – So-called "General of the Regulators", whose 1901 statue is now found at Alamance Battleground
- James Few – wounded William Tryon at battle, executed at British camp after the battle
- Charles Harrington – died from wounds received at the battle
- Abraham and John Helton

The following were excepted from pardons by Tryon:

- Samuel Jones
- Joshua Teague
- Samuel Waggoner
- Simon Dunn Jr.
- Abraham Creson
- Benjamin Merrit [Merrill]
- James Wilkerson Sr.
- Edward Smith
- Malachi Fyke
- John Bumpass
- Joseph Boring
- William Rankin
- William Robeson
- John Winkler
- John Wilcox

Six men were found guilty of treason, but were pardoned at Tryon's behest:

- Forest Mercer
- James Stewart
- James Emerson – later signed the Revolutionary War Patriots' Muster Roll as James Emison (Emmerson)
- Harmon Cox – his powder horn is now on display at Alamance Battleground
- William Brown
- James Copeland

Six men were found guilty of treason and were sentenced to be hanged, drawn and quartered, although in practice, they were only hanged:

- Benjamin Merrill
- Robert Matear (Matter)
- James Pugh
- Captain Robert Messer
- Unknown
- Unknown

== See also ==
- Shays's Rebellion
- Whiskey rebellion
