= Guilford Building =

Skyscraper in Greensboro, North Carolina, US

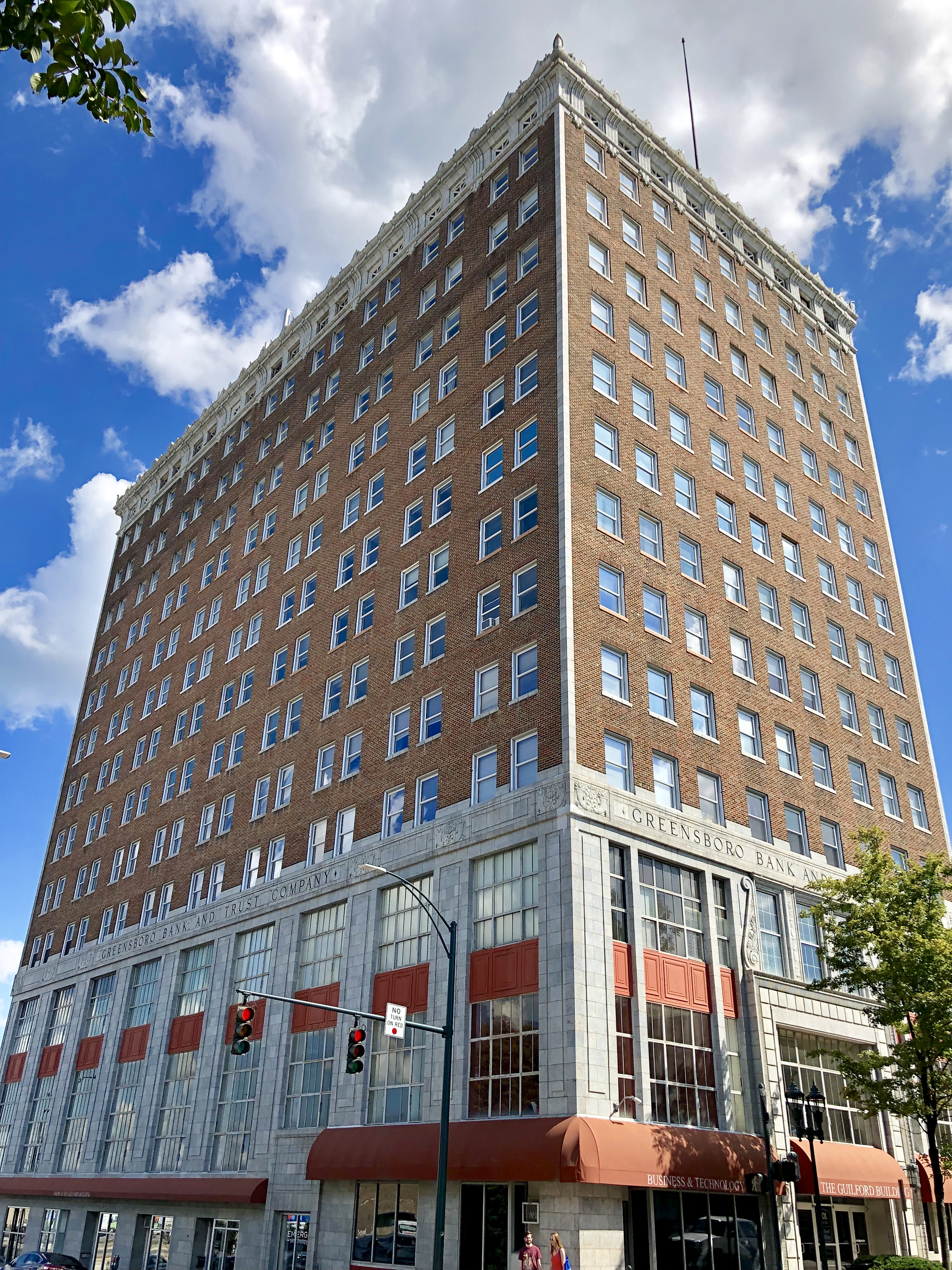
- Greensboro_Bank_and_Trust_Company_Building,_Greensboro,_NC_(48993226441) The Guilford Building in 2019
- Interactive map of the Guilford Building area
- Former names: Greensboro Bank and Trust Building

General information
- Status: Completed
- Type: Office
- Architectural style: Neo-Renaissance
- Location: 301 South Elm Street, Greensboro, North Carolina, United States
- Coordinates: 36°04′12.10″N 79°47′24.47″W
- Construction started: 1926
- Completed: 1927

Height
- Roof: 176 ft (54 m)

Technical details
- Floor count: 13

Design and construction
- Architect: Charles C. Hartmann

The Guilford Building (formerly known as the Greensboro Bank and Trust Building) is a 176 ft (54 m) tall neo-renaissance style office building located on 301 South Elm Street in Downtown Greensboro, North Carolina. The building has 13 floors and was built in 1927. Upon its completion, it was the 2nd-tallest building in Greensboro. As of August 2026, it is the 8th-tallest building in Greensboro. The building was designed by Charles C. Hartmann, who also designed the nearby Jefferson Standard Building, which was Greensboro's first skyscraper and their tallest from 1923 to 1989.

== History ==
The building, originally planned to be the King Cotton Hotel, was converted to an office building during construction. The conversion occurred due to the owners realizing that the nearby under construction train depot would cause a lot of noise and would make it hard for guests to sleep. A new 13 story building at the corner of Davie and Market Streets would be erected and chosen as the new location for the King Cotton Hotel, that building was demolished in 1971.

The building's original main tenant upon its completion, the Greensboro Bank & Trust Company, would close due to the Great Depression. It was replaced in 1931 by United Bank and & Trust Company, which would also close 3 years later. The next tenant to move in was the Guilford National Bank Company, which gave the building its current name.

In the 1960s, North Carolina National Bank would take over the space that the Guilford National Bank Company occupied.

The building would later become heavily unoccupied and run down, due to businesses moving out of Downtown Greensboro and moving to the suburbs. The tower was later on gifted to Guilford County by the Jefferson-Pilot Corporation, the building was then listed up for public auction shortly after.

In 1985, a three‑alarm fire broke out at some old warehouse buildings at Davie and Washington Streets. Construction materials behind the Guilford Building along with the front of Greensborough Court were fueling the fire. A group of firefighters were sent to protect the Guilford Building from the fire. One of the firefighters who protected the building, Raymond Holliman, along with the Poston family would later buy the building in the 1990s, they would then renovate it to what it is today.

== See also ==
- 300 North Greene Street
- James B. Dudley High School
- Vernon Building
- Guilford County Office and Court Building
