= 300 North Greene Street =

Skyscraper in Greensboro, North Carolina, US

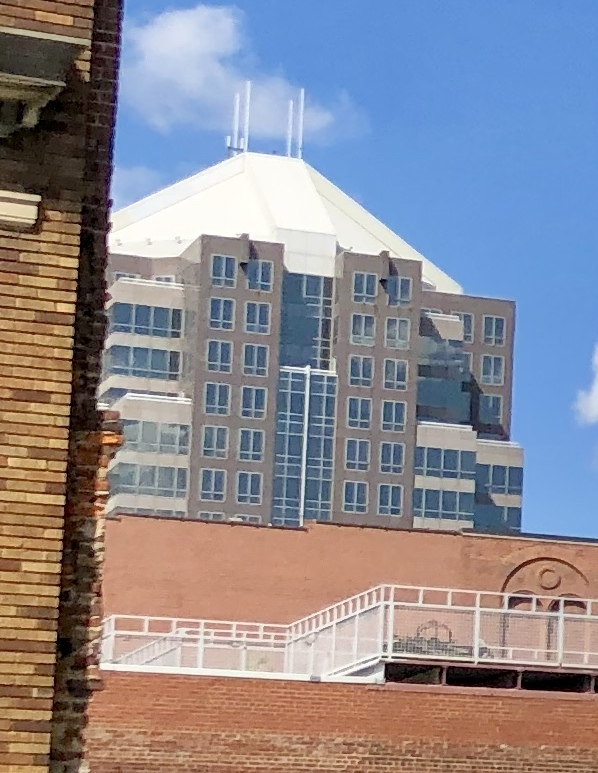
- Market Street, Greensboro, NC (48993247161) (cropped) 300 North Greene Street in 2019
- Interactive map of the 300 North Greene Street area
- Former names: Wells Fargo Tower, Wachovia Tower, First Union Tower

General information
- Status: Completed
- Type: Office
- Architectural style: Postmodern
- Location: 300 North Greene Street, Greensboro, North Carolina, United States
- Coordinates: 36°04′31.91″N 79°47′27.42″W
- Construction started: 1988
- Completed: 1989

Height
- Antenna spire: 329 ft (100 m)
- Roof: 322 ft (98 m)

Technical details
- Floor count: 21

Design and construction
- Architect: Odell & Associates

300 North Greene Street (formerly known as the Wells Fargo Tower, Wachovia Tower, and First Union Tower) is a 329 ft (100 m) tall postmodern style office building located on 300 North Greene Street in Downtown Greensboro, North Carolina. The building has 21 floors and was built in 1989. Upon its completion, it became the tallest building in Greensboro, surpassing the 233 ft (71 m) tall, Jefferson Standard Building which held the title since 1923. It also became the 10th-tallest building in North Carolina. However, the building only held the title for a short period of time, as in 1990, the 374 ft (114 m) tall, Lincoln Financial Building was built. As of August 2026, the building is the 2nd-tallest building in Greensboro, and the 41st-tallest building in North Carolina.

The building was designed by Odell & Associates, who also designed 525 North Tryon in Charlotte, One South at The Plaza in Charlotte, and One James Center in Richmond. They were also the architect of record for the Rivergate Tower in Tampa.

In 2021, the building was sold at an auction for $30.4 million dollars.

In 2024, it was announced that the Wells Fargo Downtown Greensboro branch that was situated in the tower, which gave the building its name, was going to be closed.

== See also ==
- Jefferson Standard Building
- UNCG University Libraries

=== Buildings designed or partially designed by Odell & Associates ===
- Bank of America Plaza (Tampa)
- 121 West Trade
- One Independence Center
- 525 North Tryon
- One South at The Plaza
- James Center
- Rivergate Tower
- 129 West Trade
