= Pilot Life Insurance Company Home Office =

Historic building in North Carolina, US

- U.S. National Register of Historic Places
- Location within North Carolina Location within the United States
- Location: 5300 High Point Road, Greensboro, North Carolina
- Coordinates: 36.0222°N 79.8917°W
- Built: 1927
- Architect: Hartmann, Charles C.
- Architectural style: Georgian Revival
- NRHP reference No.: 100007970
- Added to NRHP: July 2022

Pilot Life Insurance Company Home Office in Sedgefield, North Carolina outside Greensboro is a historic campus which once served as the headquarters of Pilot Life Insurance Company, founded in 1903 and merged with Jefferson Standard Insurance in 1967 to form Jefferson Pilot Corporation. It was named to the National Register of Historic Places in July 2022.

The first of the buildings began construction in 1927, and the last contributing building was built in 1965. A history of Jefferson-Pilot written in 2003 stated that the headquarters was "a careful replication of the governor's mansion built in 1767 in New Bern."

In 1930, Jefferson Standard Insurance Company gained a controlling interest in Pilot Life Insurance Co. In 1967, Pilot Life Insurance Co. and Jefferson Standard became Jefferson-Pilot Corporation. 800 Pilot Life employees moved into the Jefferson Standard Building and its 20-story addition in 1990. In 2008, Kisco Senior Living bought the Pilot Life buildings for $9.9 million. In January 2015, Kisco announced Pilot at Sedgefield, an updated version of a retirement community delayed by the economic crisis. As of 2022, Clachan Properties of Richmond, Virginia, was buying the property to develop apartments.

The National Register of Historic Places listing states that the Pilot Life campus is "the earliest-known, pioneering example of a modern suburban corporate headquarters campus in North Carolina" and "[w]ith its handsome Georgian Revival-style buildings replete with allegorical stone images lauding hard work, its layout designed for efficiency, its landscaped grounds, its fountain and lake, and its facilities for employee comfort and entertainment, the complex exemplified an early modern suburban 'corporate campus'".
