= List of tallest buildings in Greensboro =

Skyline of Greensboro
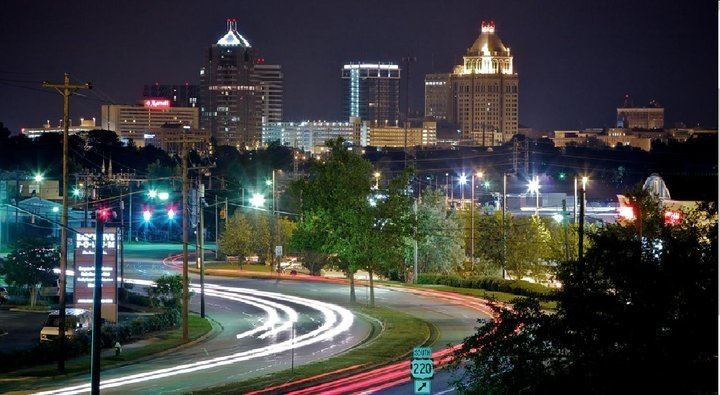
- The skyline of Greensboro in 2014
- Population: 311,293
- Tallest building: Lincoln Financial Building (1990)
- Tallest building height: 374 ft (114 m)

Number of tall buildings
- Taller than 75 m (246 ft): 3
- Taller than 100 m (328 ft): 2

Number of tall buildings — feet
- Taller than 200 ft (61.0 m): 7
- Taller than 300 ft (91.4 m): 2

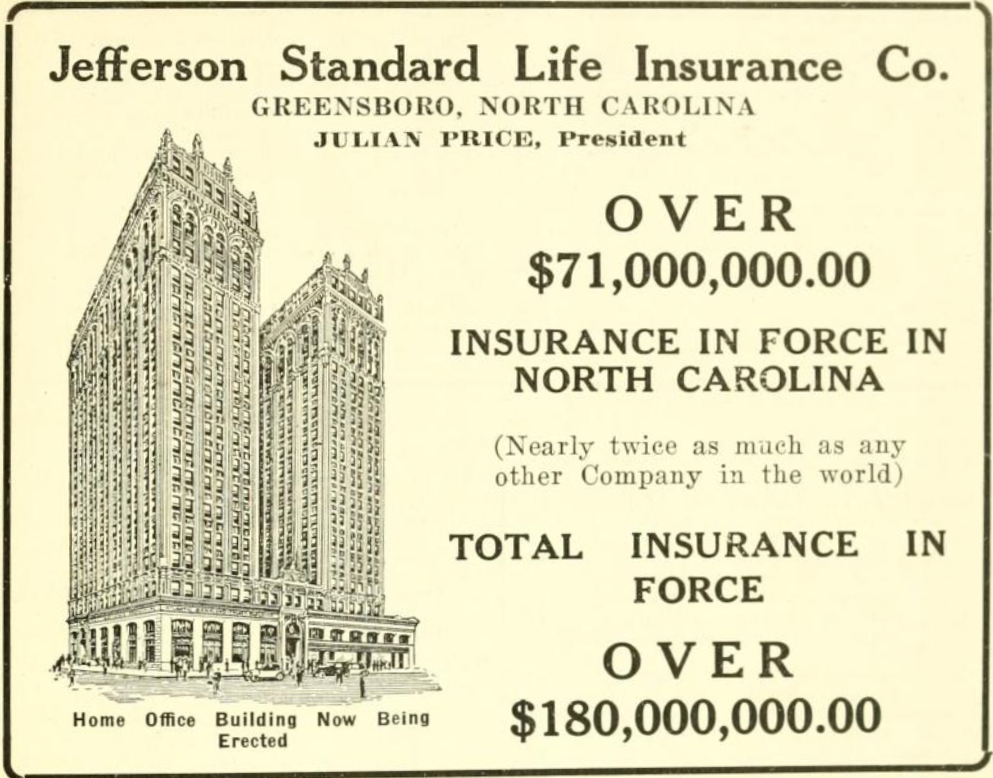
An advertisement for the Jefferson Standard Life Insurance Co. from 1923. The building depicted is the 233 ft (71 m) tall, Jefferson Standard Building which became the tallest building in Greensboro upon its completion in 1923. It was surpassed in 1989 by the 329 ft (100 m) tall, 300 North Greene Street which was then surpassed in 1990 by the 374 ft (114 m) tall, Lincoln Financial Building.

Greensboro is the 3rd-largest city in the U.S. state of North Carolina. As of August 2026, the city has a population of 311,293 people. The city currently has 12 buildings which stand over 150 ft (46 m) tall, 7 buildings which stand over 200 ft (61 m) tall, 2 buildings which stand over 300 ft (91 m) tall, and 2 buildings which stand over 328 ft (100 m) tall.

As of August 2026, the tallest building in Greensboro is the 374 ft (114 m) tall, Lincoln Financial Building which has 20 floors and was built in 1990. The 2nd-tallest building in Greensboro as of August 2026 is the 329 ft (100 m) tall, 300 North Greene Street which has 21 floors and was built in 1989, it was also the tallest building in Greensboro from 1989 to 1990. The most recently completed high-rise to stand over 150 ft (46 m) tall is the 208 ft (63 m) tall, Grandover Resort & Spa, A Wyndham Grand Hotel which has 12 floors and was built in 1999.

== History ==
Number of buildings by height in Greensboro by the end of each year. Click on the legend to toggle a specific height on or off. View chart definition.

== Map of tallest buildings ==
The map below shows the locations of the buildings in Greensboro that stand over 150 ft (46 m) in height. Each marker is given a number based on the buildings ranking in the list. The color of each marker represents the decade that the building was completed in. Most of the tallest buildings in Greensboro are located in the downtown, except for the Sheraton Greensboro Hotel at Four Seasons towers, and the Grandover Resort & Spa, A Wyndham Grand Hotel. All three of those buildings aren't included in the map.

Buildings in Greensboro that stand over 150 ft (46 m).
- 1950s and before
- 1960s
- 1970s
- 1980s
- 1990s
- 2000s
- 2010s
- 2020s
1 Lincoln Financial Building
2 300 North Greene Street
3 Sheraton Greensboro Hotel at Four Seasons
4 Renaissance Plaza
5 Jefferson Standard Building
6 Center Pointe
7 Grandover Resort & Spa, A Wyndham Grand Hotel
8 Guilford Building
9 Sheraton Greensboro Hotel at Four Seasons
10 Gateway Plaza
11 Self-Help Center
12 US Trust Center

== Tallest buildings ==
This list ranks buildings in Greensboro that stand at least 150 ft (46 m) tall. Spires and other architectural details are included in the height of a building, however, antennas are excluded.

Tallest building in Greensboro upon completion

Rank	Name	Image	Location	Height	Floors	Year	Purpose	Notes	References
1	Lincoln Financial Building	Lincoln_Financial_Building,_Greensboro,_NC_(48993248946)	36°04′22.27″N 79°47′28.01″W	374 ft (114 m)	20	1990	Office	Tallest building in Greensboro since 1990.; Designed by Smallwood.	
2	300 North Greene Street	NewBridgeBankPark_(cropped)	36°04′31.91″N 79°47′27.42″W	329 ft (100 m)	21	1989	Office	Tallest building in Greensboro from 1989 to 1990.; Designed by Odell & Associates.	
3	Sheraton Greensboro Hotel at Four Seasons	Sheraton_four_Seasons_Hotel_(cropped)_1	36°02′29.53″N 79°50′25.16″W	269 ft (82 m)	28	1991	Hotel		
4	Renaissance Plaza	United Guaranty Building	36°04′28.55″N 79°47′22.88″W	240 ft (73 m)	19	1989	Office		
5=	Jefferson Standard Building	Jefferson Standard Building, Greensboro, NC	36°04′22.16″N 79°47′25.76″W	233 ft (71 m)	18	1923	Office	Tallest building in Greensboro from 1923 to 1989.	
5=	Center Pointe	Center_Pointe_Building	36°04′25.53″N 79°47′25.96″W	233 ft (71 m)	16	1967	Residential	The building was renovated and converted from office to residential use in 2009.	
7	Grandover Resort & Spa, A Wyndham Grand Hotel	Grandover Resort & Spa, A Wyndham Grand Hotel	35°59′32.41″N 79°52′50.07″W	208 ft (63 m)	12	1999	Hotel		
8	Guilford Building	Greensboro Bank and Trust Company Building, Greensboro, NC (48993412507) (cropped)	36°04′12.10″N 79°47′24.47″W	176 ft (54 m)	13	1927	Office	Designed by Charles C. Hartmann.	
9	Sheraton Greensboro Hotel at Four Seasons	Sheraton four Seasons Hotel (cropped) 2	36°02′30.69″N 79°50′26.50″W	167 ft (51 m)	16	1970	Hotel		
10	Gateway Plaza	Gateway Plaza Elm Street, Greensboro, NC (48993214256) (cropped)	36°04′05.55″N 79°47′33.05″W	160 ft (49 m)	15	1975	Residential		
11	Self-Help Center	122 North Elm Street Elm Street, Elm Street, Greensboro, NC (48993439732) (cropped)	36°04′23.74″N 79°47′23.51″W	156 ft (48 m)	10	1971	Office		
12	US Trust Center	US Trust Center NewBridgeBankPark (cropped)	36°04′32.05″N 79°47′25.29″W	150 ft (46 m)	10	1980	Office		

== Timeline of tallest buildings ==
Name	Image	Years as tallest	Height	Floors
Jefferson Standard Building	Jefferson_Standard_Insurance_Company_Building,_Greensboro,_NC_(48992704153)	1923-1989	233 ft (71 m)	18
300 North Greene Street	Market_Street,_Greensboro,_NC_(48993247161)_(cropped)	1989-1990	329 ft (100 m)	21
Lincoln Financial Building	Lincoln_Financial_Building,_Greensboro,_NC	1990-Present	374 ft (114 m)	20

== See also ==
- List of tallest buildings in North Carolina
- List of tallest buildings in Asheville
- List of tallest buildings in Charlotte
- List of tallest buildings in Raleigh
- List of tallest buildings in Winston-Salem
