= Edgar Allan Poe (disambiguation) =

Edgar Allan Poe (1809–1849) was an American writer, editor, and literary critic.

Edgar Allan Poe, sometimes misspelled Edgar Allen Poe, may also refer to:

== Arts and entertainment ==
- Edgar Allan Poe Awards, a literary award
- Edgar Allen Poe (film), a 1909 film

== Schools in the United States ==
- Edgar Allan Poe School, Philadelphia, Pennsylvania, now the Girard Academic Music Program
- The former Edgar Allan Poe School of English, University of Virginia
- Edgar Allan Poe Middle School, Fairfax County, Virginia
- Edgar Allan Poe Middle School, San Antonio Independent School District, San Antonio, Texas
- Edgar Allan Poe Elementary School (disambiguation)

== Other uses ==
- Edgar Allan Poe (attorney general) (1871–1961), attorney general of Maryland
- USS E.A. Poe, a United States Navy World War II dry storage ship formerly named Edgar Allan Poe
- Edgar Allan Poe Museum (disambiguation), also Edgar Allan Poe House

== See also ==
- Edgar Poe (A Series of Unfortunate Events), a character in A Series of Unfortunate Events
