= Haymount District =

Historic district in North Carolina, United States

- U.S. National Register of Historic Places
- U.S. Historic district
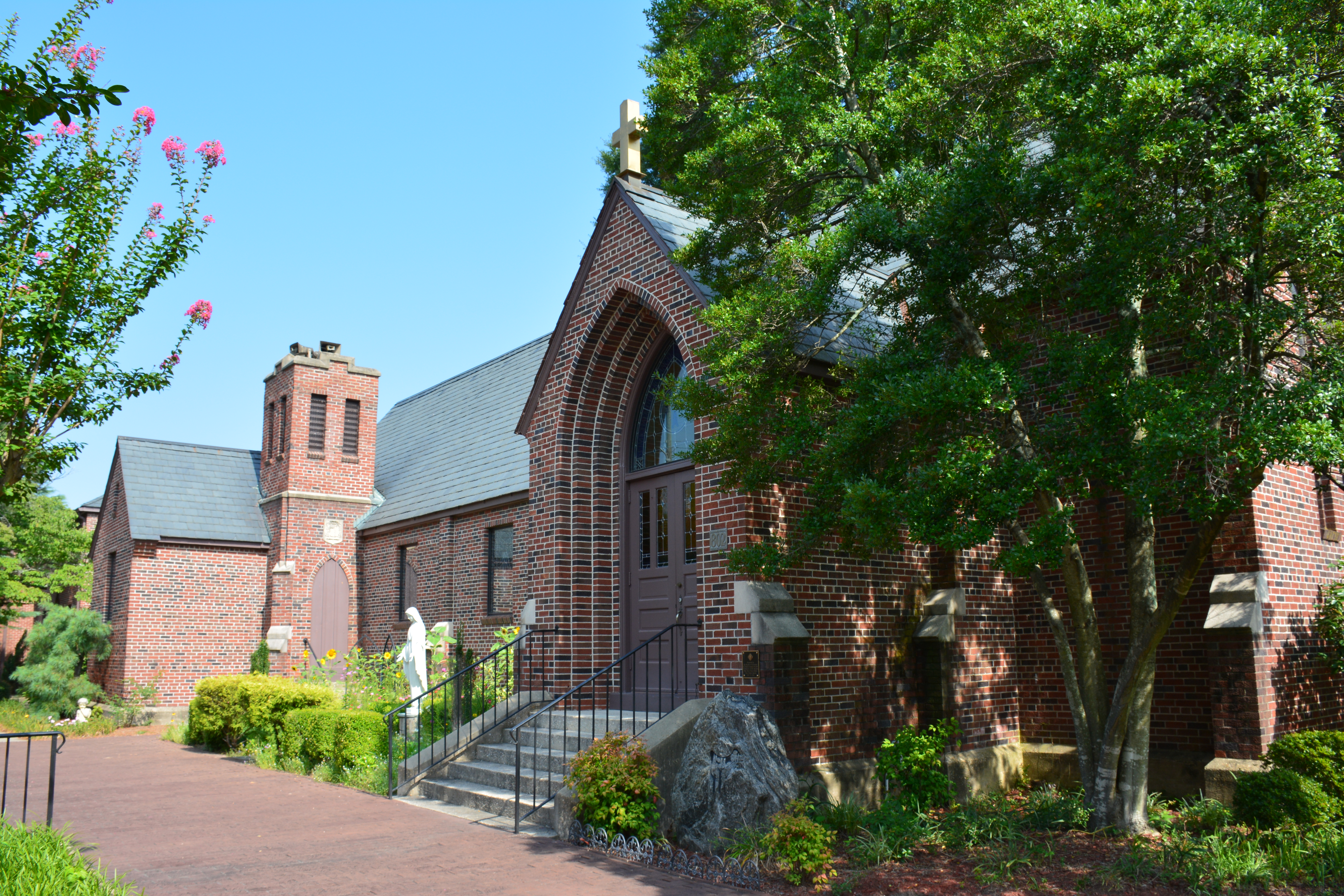
- St. Michael's Catholic Church

- Location within North Carolina Location within the United States
- Location: Roughly Hillside Ave, from Bragg Blvd. to Purshing St.; 100-200 blocks Bradford Ave., 801 Hay St., 801, 802, 806 Arsenal Ave., Fayetteville, North Carolina
- Coordinates: 35°3′24″N 78°53′22″W
- Area: 40 acres (16 ha)
- Built: 1817
- Built by: Vaughn, Ruffin
- Architect: Hartmann, Charles; Multiple
- Architectural style: Queen Anne, Colonial Revival
- MPS: Fayetteville MRA
- NRHP reference No.: 83001856, 07000296 (Boundary Increase)
- Added to NRHP: August 7, 1983, April 10, 2007 (Boundary Increase)

Haymount District, also known as Haymount Historic District, is a national historic district located at Fayetteville, Cumberland County, North Carolina. It encompasses 60 contributing buildings and 1 contributing site in a primarily residential section of Fayetteville. The dwellings were built between about 1817 and 1950, and include notable examples of Queen Anne and Colonial Revival style architecture. The earliest extant residence is the Robert Strange Town House (c. 1817), home of Senator Robert Strange (1796–1854). Another notable building is the Highsmith Memorial Hospital, designed by architect Charles C. Hartmann and completed in 1926. Also located in the district is the separately listed Edgar Allan Poe House.

It was listed on the National Register of Historic Places in 1983, with a boundary increase in 2007.
