= Edgar Allan Poe House (Fayetteville, North Carolina) =

Historic house in North Carolina, United States

- 1897 Poe House
- U.S. National Register of Historic Places
- U.S. Historic district – Contributing property
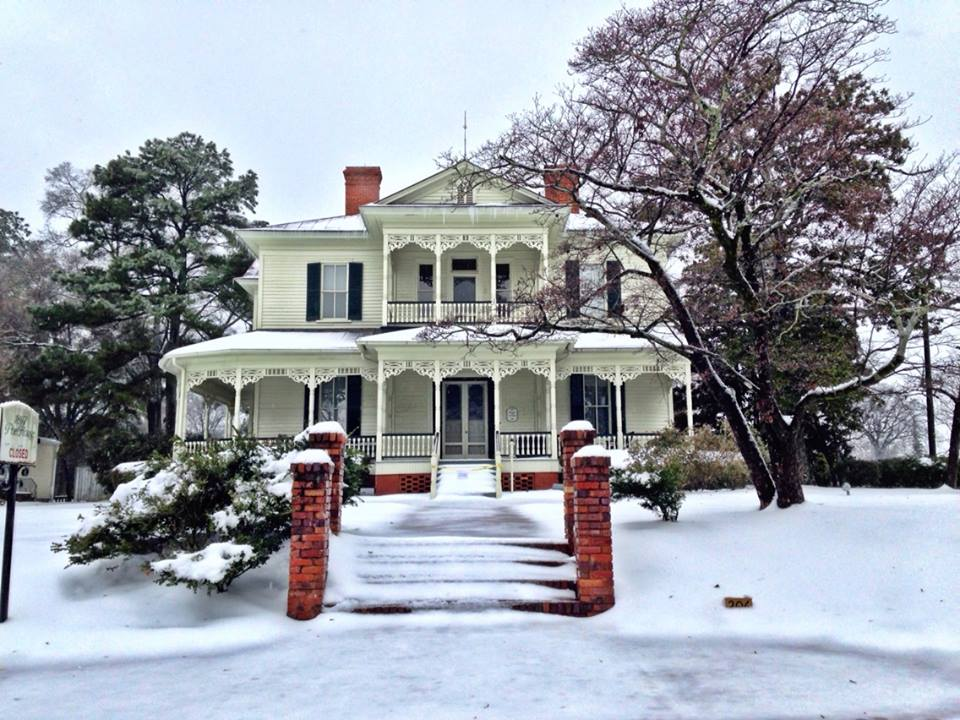

- Location within North Carolina Location within the United States
- Location: 206 Bradford Ave., Fayetteville, North Carolina
- Coordinates: 35°3′15.1″N 78°53′34″W
- Area: less than one acre
- Built: 1896
- Architect: Vaughn, Ruffin
- Architectural style: Stick/eastlake
- MPS: Fayetteville MRA
- NRHP reference No.: 83001869
- Added to NRHP: July 7, 1983

The 1897 Poe House is a historic home located at Fayetteville, Cumberland County, North Carolina.

It was built between 1896 and 1898, and is a two-story, three-bay frame house with Eastlake movement / Stick Style decorative elements. It features a wraparound porch which is double-tiered in the central bay and graced by delicate sawnwork and turned posts.

It was listed on the National Register of Historic Places in 1983. It is located in the Haymount Historic District.

It is named after the successful businessman, politician, and civic leader who built it; not the well-known American author Edgar Allan Poe. To avoid confusion, the Fayetteville native is generally referenced as "E. A." in the local area and the historic house museum is known simply as Poe House. It is also referenced as the 1897 Poe House and part of the Museum of the Cape Fear Historical Complex.

== See also ==
- Edgar Allan Poe House (Lenoir, North Carolina)
- Edgar Allan Poe Museum (disambiguation)
