= Edgar Allan Poe House (Lenoir, North Carolina) =

Historic house in North Carolina, United States

- U.S. National Register of Historic Places
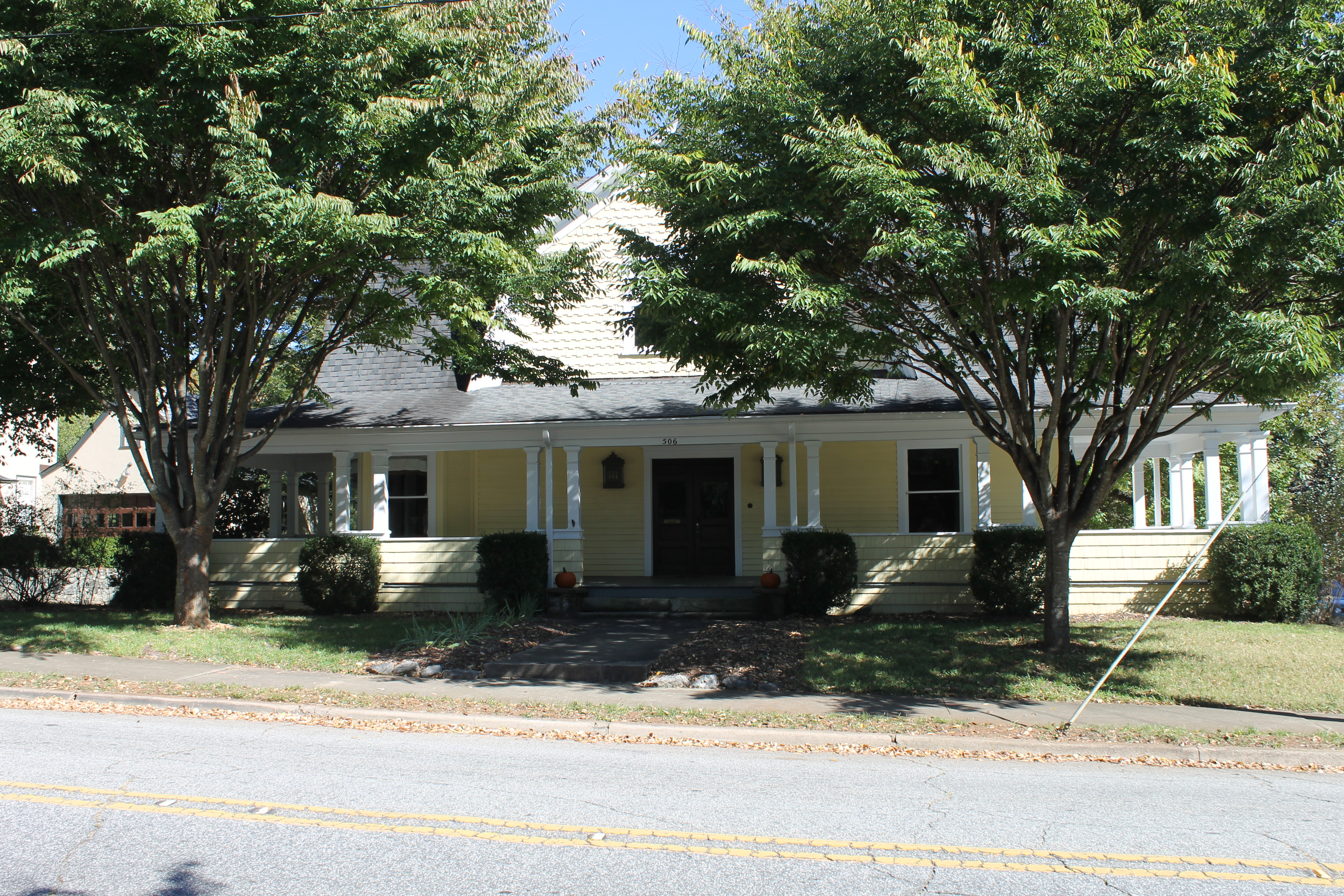
- Edgar Allan Poe House, 506 Main St. NW, Lenoir, North Carolina

- Location within North Carolina Location within the United States
- Location: 506 Main St. NW, Lenoir, North Carolina
- Coordinates: 35°55′5″N 81°32′28″W
- Built: 1905
- Built by: Poe, Edgar Allan
- Architectural style: Colonial Revival
- NRHP reference No.: 01000514
- Added to NRHP: May 18, 2001

The Edgar Allan Poe House is a historic home located in Caldwell County at 506 Main Street NW in Lenoir, North Carolina.

The two-story Dutch Colonial Revival style house with wraparound porch and gambrel roof was built in 1905 by Edgar Allan Poe, rather than the famous Boston poet born 1809. After finishing law school, Poe moved to Asheville in 1890 and worked as a carpenter with local architecture firm Alfonse, building structures in Hickory. Additionally Poe contributed to the beginning construction of Vanderbilt's Biltmore Estate in Asheville. The business district in the town of Lenoir was founded in 1841. Growth was slow until the arrival of Chester & Lenoir Railroad in 1884, which boosted trade and industrial development. During this local industrial boom, Poe moved from his native home of Dallas, North Carolina, to Lenoir in 1893. Poe constructed several commercial buildings in Lenoir including the Courtney Building (1907) and the Lenoir Furniture and Hardware Building (1908). The largest contract attributed to Poe was the construction of the Caldwell County Courthouse (1903). In 1897 on October 28 Edgar Allan Poe married Eugenia Maude Miller, daughter of a pioneering family who moved to Caldwell County in the early 1890s. The Miller family owned property on North Main Street and built a house where Eugenia Maude lived until marriage. Poe built his first house in the neighborhood of his in-laws, on Scroggs Street. Poe's two children, Eugene Allan (1898-1964) and Carolyn Ransom (1903-1979), were born in the house on Scroggs Street. In 1905, the Poe family bought a half acre on North Main Street and began constructing their second home. This second house on North Main Street remained in ownership of the Poe family until August 1999. Poe was an active member of the community as an architect, a prolific builder, a lawyer, and the mayor of Lenoir for four years.

The home was restored by Joel Kincaid and listed on the National Register of Historic Places in March 2001.

== See also ==
- Edgar Allan Poe House (Fayetteville, North Carolina)
- Edgar Allan Poe Museum (disambiguation)
