= Lexington Memorial Hospital =

Historic hospital in North Carolina, US

- U.S. National Register of Historic Places
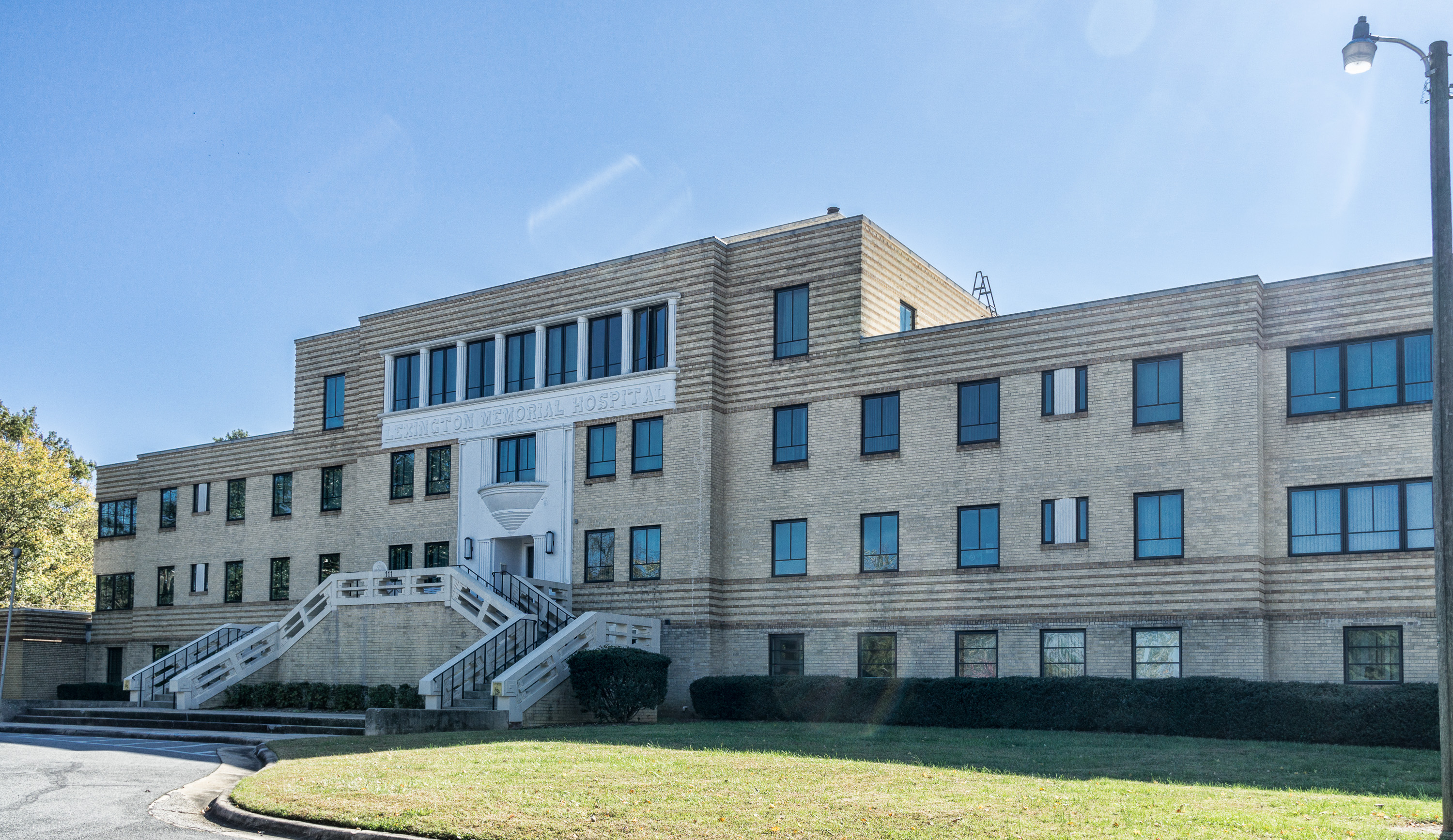

- Location within North Carolina Location within the United States
- Location: 111 North Carolina Ave., Lexington, North Carolina
- Coordinates: 35°48′35″N 80°14′53″W
- Area: 3.07 acres (1.24 ha)
- Built: 1946, 1951, 1952
- Architect: Hartmann, Charles Conrad
- Architectural style: Art Deco, Moderne
- NRHP reference No.: 12000313
- Added to NRHP: May 24, 2012

Lexington Memorial Hospital is a historic hospital building located at Lexington, Davidson County, North Carolina. It was designed by architect Charles C. Hartmann in a mix of Art Deco and Art Moderne styles. It was built in 1946, and is a large masonry T-shaped building sheathed in yellow brick, three and four stories tall and 17 bays wide. It has a one-story addition on the east end and a 1958 one-story addition off the rear wing.

Lexington's first hospital, 30-bed Davidson Hospital, was built in 1924 on North Main Street in the location that later became Char's Restaurant. Significant growth over the next 20 years led to the decision to buy 11 acres on Lexington's east side for a new hospital on Weaver Drive. $400,000 was raised and the new 60-bed Lexington Memorial Hospital opened December 24, 1946. Additions included a nurses' residence in 1949. By 1958, the hospital had 98 beds and 20 bassinets. Further additions were made in 1966, 1971 and 1972, but by 1977, the building could no longer be expanded in the Weaver Drive location. Groundbreaking was held for a third location on the 75-acre Alma Grubb Estate next to Business 85 south of downtown. With the opening of a 94-bed 119,000-square-foot facility in September 1979, the Weaver Drive building was sold to provide housing for the elderly. It was added to the National Register of Historic Places in 2012.

== Hilltop Terrace Apartments ==
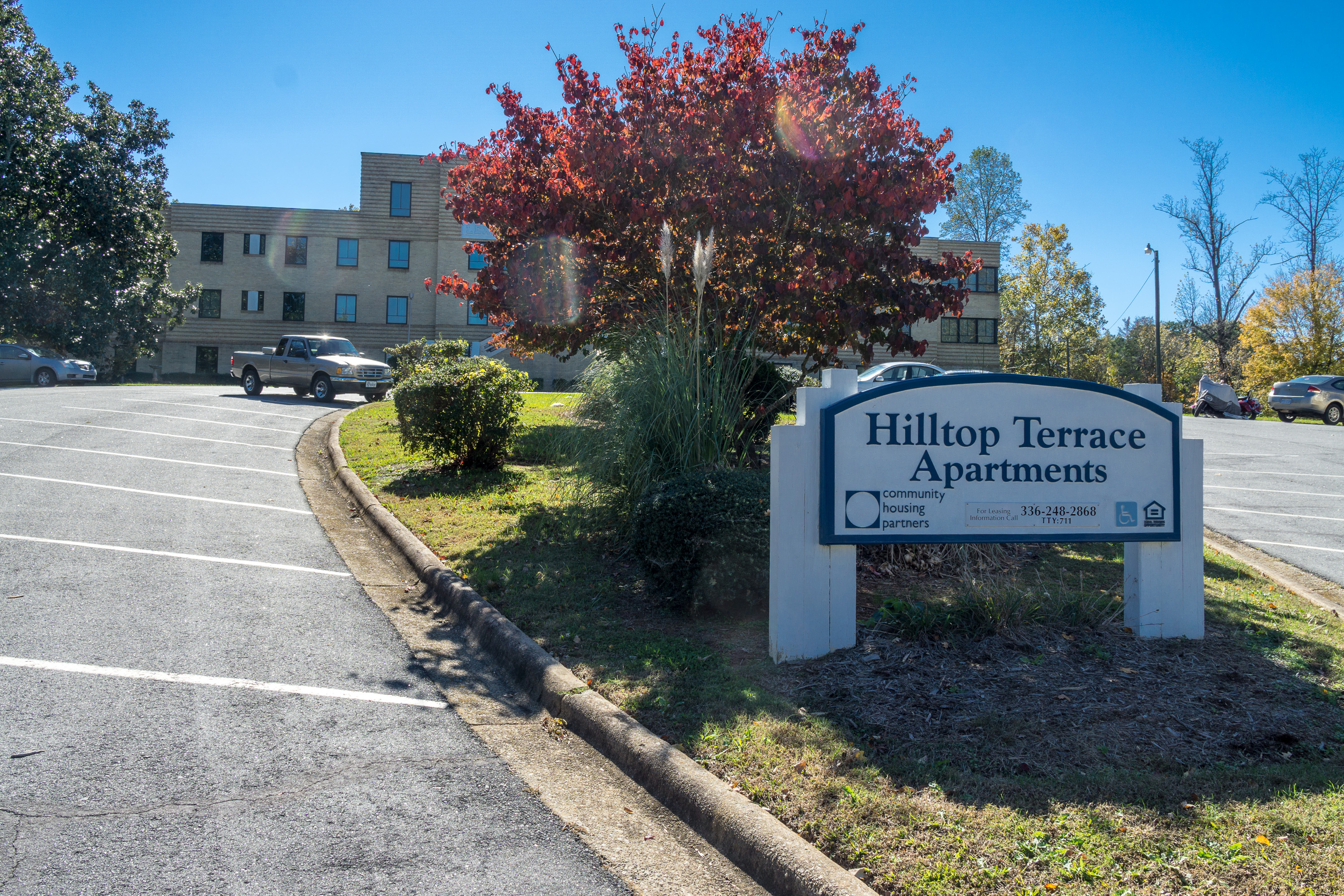
Sign for Hilltop Terrace Apartments, formerly Lexington Memorial Hospital, North Carolina

In 2008, the former hospital was purchased by Community Housing Partners. The building was fully renovated in 2012 with all-new kitchen cabinets and appliances, flooring, windows, heating, and cooling systems. The renovation was conducted in compliance with federal historic rehabilitation standards, and maintains many of the historical aspects of the building. The building re-opened in January 2013 as Hilltop Terrace Apartments.

== See also ==
- National Register of Historic Places listings in Davidson County, North Carolina
