= Central Fire Station (Greensboro, North Carolina) =

Historic building in North Carolina, US

- U.S. National Register of Historic Places
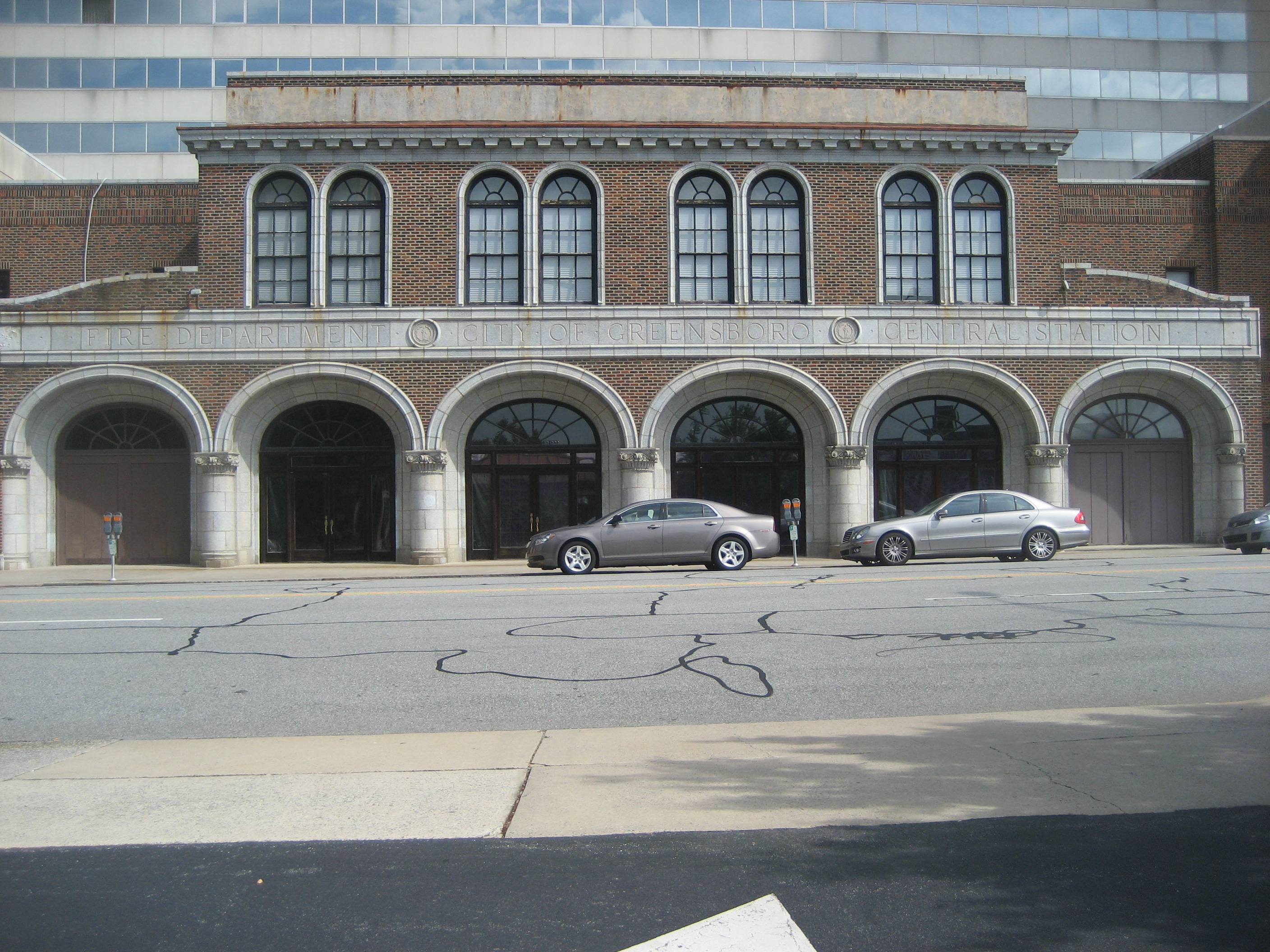
- The original Central Fire Station Building, September 2012

- Location within North Carolina Location within the United States
- Location: 318 N. Greene St., Greensboro, North Carolina
- Coordinates: 36°4′33″N 79°47′29″W
- Area: less than one acre
- Built: 1925-1926
- Architect: Hartmann, Charles C.
- Architectural style: Classical Revival, Renaissance
- NRHP reference No.: 80002837
- Added to NRHP: April 28, 1980

Central Fire Station is a historic fire station located at Greensboro, Guilford County, North Carolina. It was designed by architect Charles C. Hartmann and built in 1925–1926. It is a two-story, red brick building with carved granite ornamentation in the Renaissance Revival building. It is nine bays wide and has a six bay wide stepped and projecting pavilion with flattened arches and attached granite columns. The building once had a six-story tower, removed in the early-1950s.

It was listed on the National Register of Historic Places in 1980.
