= Poe Elementary School =

Poe Elementary School may refer to:

- Poe Elementary School (Houston), Texas, U.S.
- Poe Elementary School, Wheeling Community Consolidated School District 21, Illinois, U.S.
- Edgar Allan Poe Classical School, a school in Chicago, Illinois, U.S.
- Poe Elementary School (Raleigh, North Carolina), a school in Raleigh, North Carolina, U.S.
- Edgar Allan Poe School, an elementary school in The Bronx, New York City, U.S.

== See also ==
- Edgar Allan Poe School (disambiguation)
- Edgar Allan Poe
