= Harry Wolf (architect) =

American architect

Harry Wolf is an American architect based out of Los Angeles. He has won five American Institute of Architects (AIA) National Honor Awards for his work and 30 regional and state AIA honors.

Wolf and his firm Wolf+ won the 1991 Award for Architectural Excellence given by the Florida chapter of the American Institute of Architects for the NCNB National Bank (now Rivergate Tower) building design in Tampa, Florida. Wolf also won the 1993 National Honor Award of the American Institute of Architects for his NationsBank Plaza Building in Tampa.

Wolf started his architecture career in North Carolina, worked in New York for five years, and then moved to Los Angeles. Wolf's parking-garage designs were displayed in the National Building Museum's "House of Cars: Innovation and the Parking Garage" exhibit in 2010.

Wolf received graduated with a bachelor's degree from Georgia Tech and received a bachelor of architecture from MIT. He worked at Skidmore, Owings, and Merrill in New York, served in the National Guard in Germany, and opened Wolf Architecture in North Carolina before returning to New York for 21 years and then moving to California. He has four adult children.

== Work ==
- Mecklenburg County Courthouse in Charlotte, North Carolina
- The Mickey and Friends parking garage at Disneyland
- UCSD Revelle Parking garage, shaped like is a circular urn
- Coca Cola Plaza building (originally the Equitable Life Assurance Building) on Morrison Boulevard in Charlotte, North Carolina
