= Atlantic Bank and Trust Company Building =

- U.S. National Register of Historic Places
- U.S. Historic district – Contributing property
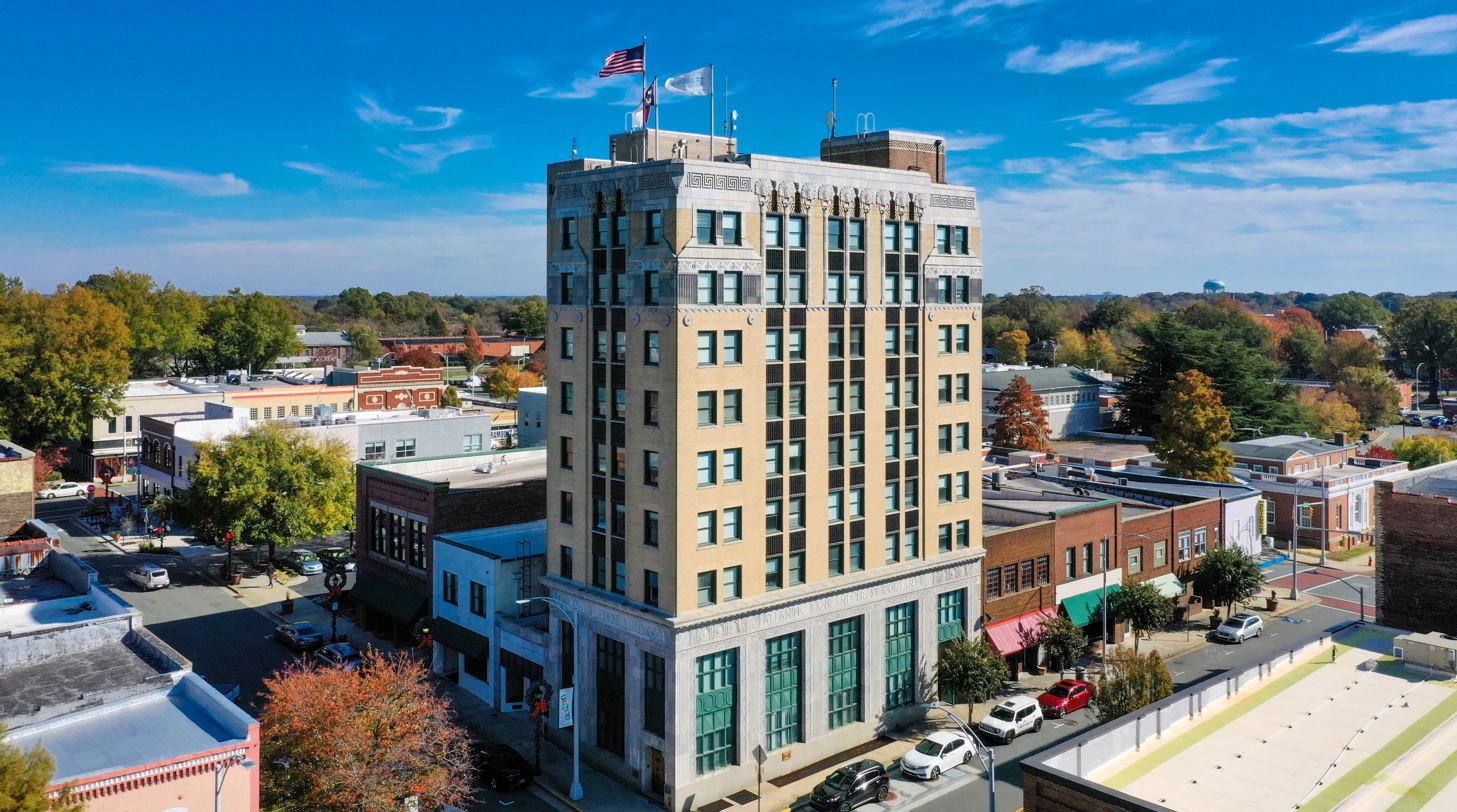

- Location within North Carolina Location within the United States
- Location: 358 S. Main St., Burlington, North Carolina
- Coordinates: 36°5′36″N 79°26′15″W
- Area: less than one acre
- Built: 1928
- Architect: Hartmann, Charles C.
- Architectural style: Art Deco
- MPS: Burlington MRA
- NRHP reference No.: 84001909
- Added to NRHP: May 31, 1984

Atlantic Bank and Trust Company Building, also known as the North Carolina National Bank Building, is a historic bank building located in Burlington, Alamance County, North Carolina. It was designed by architect Charles C. Hartmann and built in 1928–1929. It is a nine-story, steel-framed midrise in the Art Deco style. It features rich granite ornamentation at the bottom and top pairs of stories.

It was added to the National Register of Historic Places in 1984. It is located in the Downtown Burlington Historic District.
