= Sedgefield, North Carolina =

- Populated place
- Interactive map of Sedgefield, North Carolina
- Coordinates: 36.015°N 79.897°W
- Country: United States
- State: North Carolina
- County: Guilford
- Elevation: 1,040 ft (317 m)
- Time zone: UTC-5 (Eastern (EST))
  - Summer (DST): UTC-4 (EDT)
- ZIP code: 27407
- Area code: 336

Sedgefield is a populated place within the city of Greensboro, North Carolina in Guilford County, North Carolina, United States.

== History ==
New York executive John Cobb bought 3660 acres for a hunting preserve he called Sedgefield for sedge broom found there. After he died in 1923, Southern Real Estate Co. bought the land and planned a community there. A.W. McAlister, a major investor in the company, built a headquarters for his insurance company Pilot Life. In 2022, the headquarters was listed on the National Register of Historic Places.

Southern Real Estate built the first 18-hole golf course and Tudor style inn at Sedgefield Country Club in 1929, intending it to be like Pinehurst Resort. Valley Brook course was designed by Donald Ross, also a designer of Pinehurst. The Great Depression interfered with further plans, however, and a second Ross-designed course and business district never happened. Still, the community became a town, though not an incorporated one, with its own sewage service, water system, and sheriff's deputies acting as its police force. Even the approach of Greensboro and High Point, with the threat of annexation by those cities, did not result in incorporation.

Sedgefield was the first home to the Greater Greensboro Open golf tournament when it started in 1938, alternating with Starmount Country Club until 1961, and hosting every year until 1976. The tournament returned to Sedgefield in 2008 with the name Wyndham Championship. The inn became the golf course clubhouse in 1992, but only the brick and stucco exterior remained, with the interior given an "old" look.

== Geography ==
Sedgefield is located at latitude 36.015 and longitude -79.897. The elevation is 873 feet.

== Transportation ==
Major roads include Groometown Road which connects to NC 62. High Point Road, later renamed Gate City Boulevard, is a route that drivers can take from Four Seasons Town Centre and from the Coliseum to downtown Sedgefield. The route was originally the only way to get from the Mall and Coliseum to get to Jamestown through downtown Sedgefield. However, a bypass with an expressway grade was built in 2016, with the name High Point Road still used on the old route.

== Notable people ==
- Drew Gehling, actor
