= Charles C. Hartmann =

American architect (1889–1977)

- Born: 1889; New York, New York, United States
- Died: December 31, 1977 (aged 88)
- Occupation: Architect

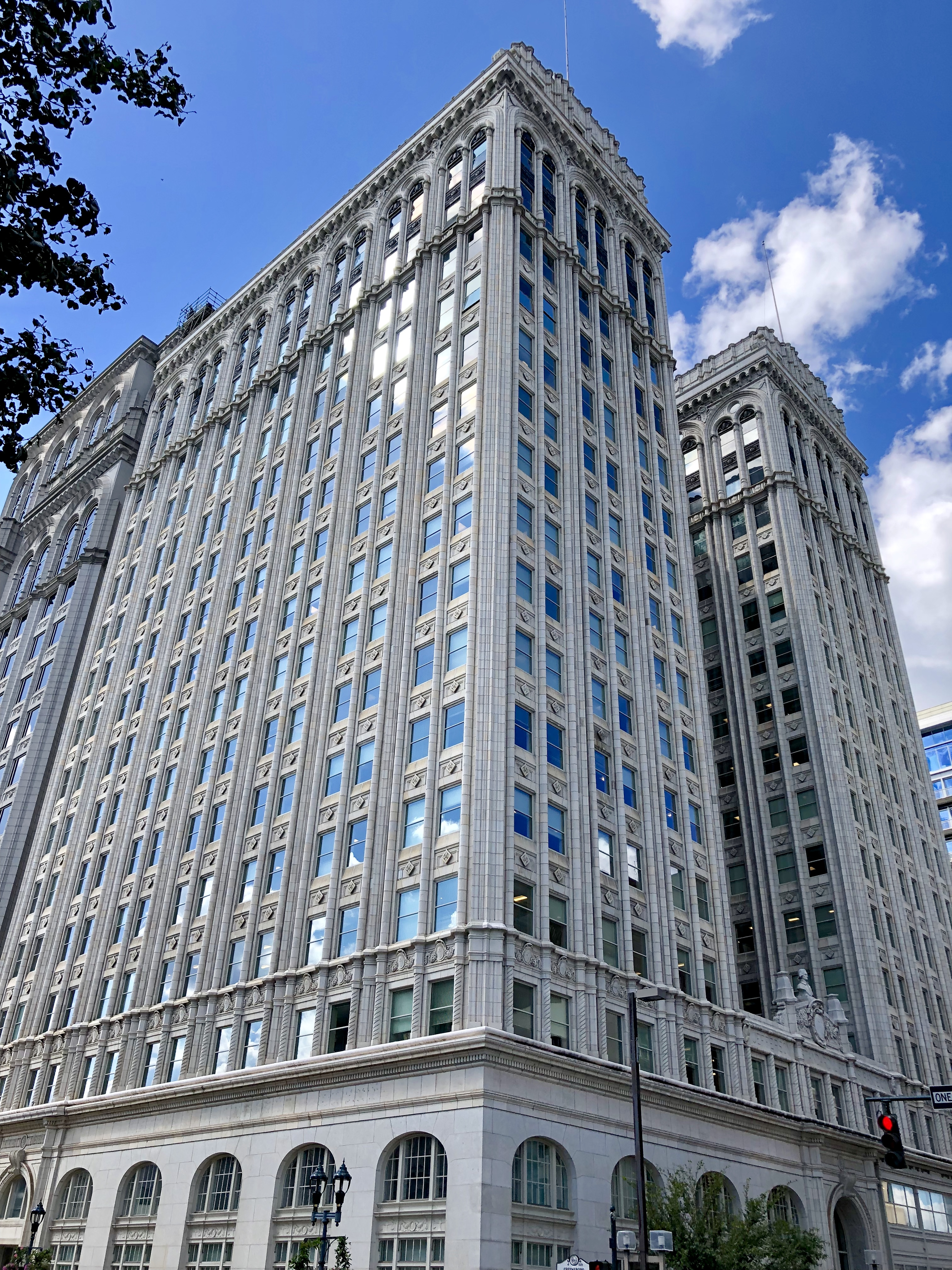
The Jefferson Standard Building (1923) in Greensboro, designed in an eclectic Mediterranean Revival style

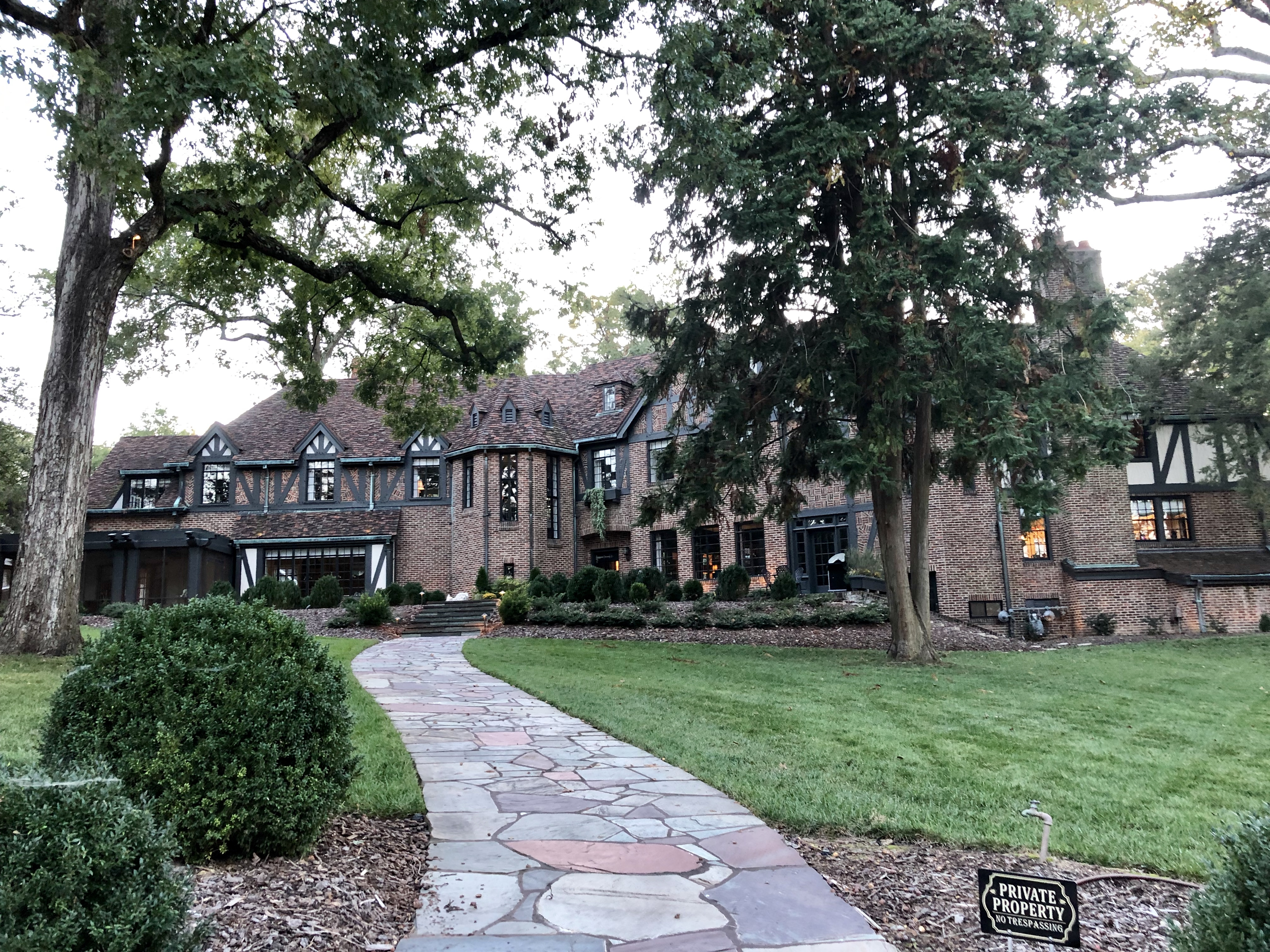
Hillside (1929) in Greensboro, designed in the Tudor Revival style

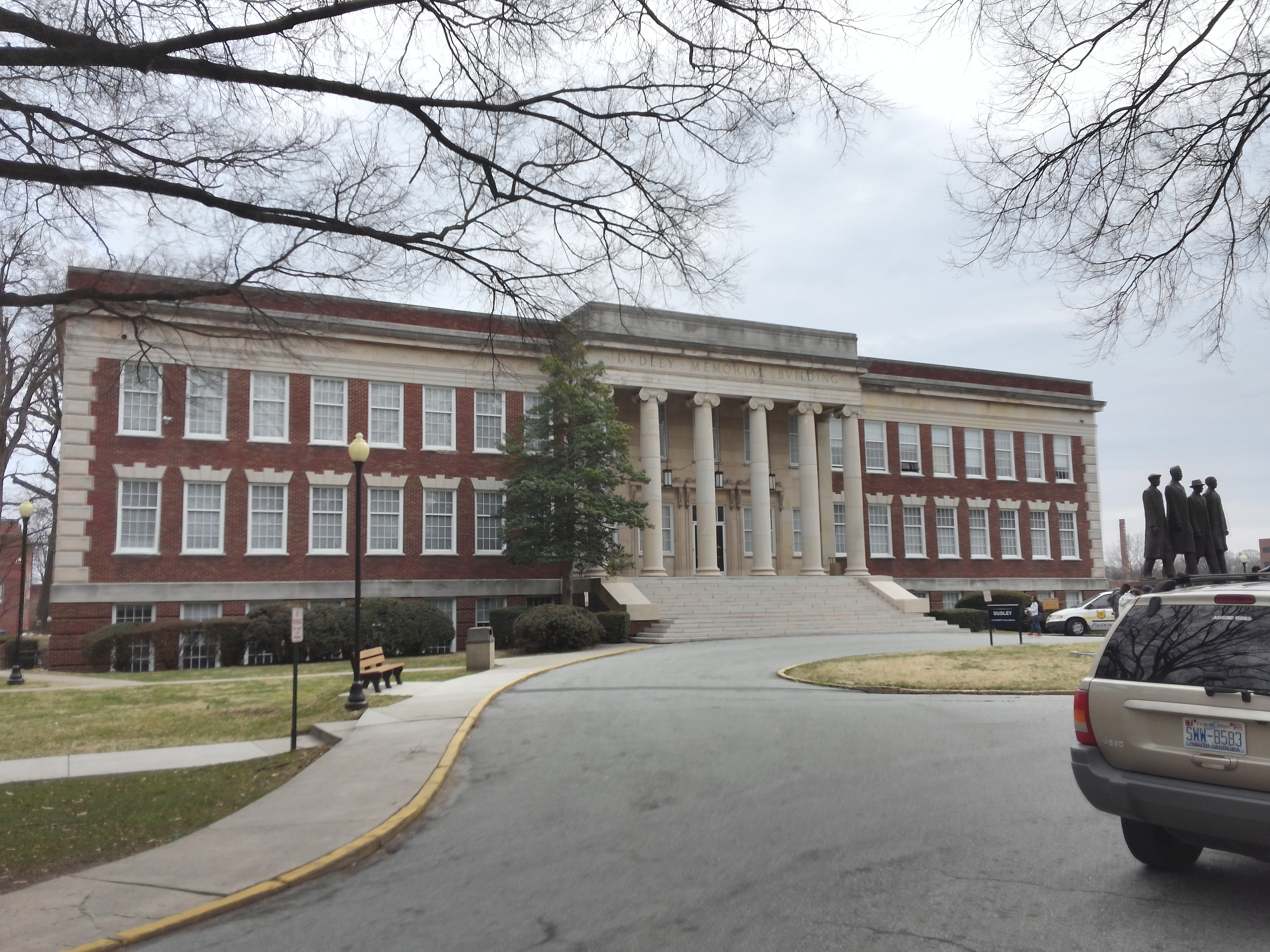
The Dudley Memorial Building (1930) of North Carolina A&T State University, designed in the Colonial Revival style

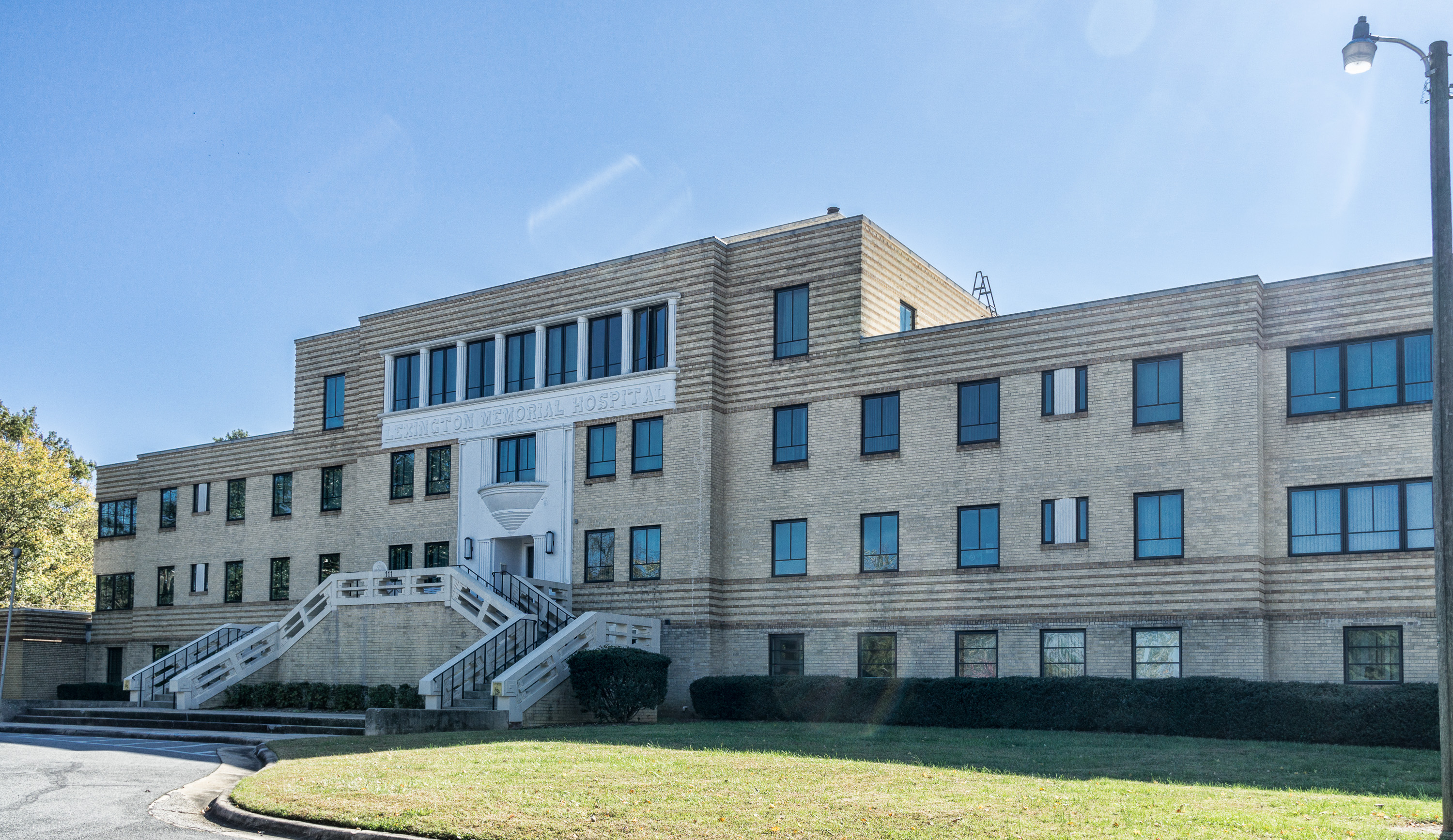
The Lexington Memorial Hospital (1946), designed in the Art Moderne style

Charles C. Hartmann (1889 – December 31, 1977) was an American architect in practice in Greensboro, North Carolina, from 1921 until his retirement in 1966.

== Early life and professional career ==
Charles Conrad Hartmann was born in 1889 in New York City to Swiss-German parents. In 1905 he became an apprentice in the office of Warren & Wetmore and in 1907 was employed as a draftsman by Charles E. Birge. He was educated in design in an atelier affiliated with the Beaux-Arts Institute of Design and as a special student at the Massachusetts Institute of Technology.

In 1913 he returned to New York to work for William Lee Stoddart, a noted architect of hotels. During his time with the Stoddart firm Hartmann would rise to the level of associate partner. Immediately after World War I he began to visit North Carolina to supervise construction of two Stoddart-designed hotels, the O. Henry (1919, demolished) in Greensboro and the Sheraton (1921) in High Point. In Greensboro Hartmann developed contacts with the local business community and in 1921 executives of the Jefferson Standard Life Insurance Company invited Hartmann to design the company's new headquarters on the condition he establish himself in Greensboro. The resulting Jefferson Standard Building (1923, NRHP-listed) established Hartmann as a leading member of Greensboro's small architectural community. He became well known for the design of tall commercial buildings in communities throughout North Carolina and for homes for the businessmen that commissioned them.

Unlike other architects, Hartmann remained busy during the Great Depression. After World War II, in 1946, he formed a partnership with his son, Charles C. Hartmann Jr., the firm becoming known as Charles C. Hartmann, Architects. Their projects after the war were similar in type to those completed before. Hartmann retired from practice in 1966.

== Personal life and death ==
Hartmann was active in the North Carolina Architectural Association and of the North Carolina chapter of the American Institute of Architects (AIA) and as a leader of both led the consolidation of the two organizations under the AIA banner in the 1940s. He was also active in local fraternal and social organizations.

Hartmann died December 31, 1977.

== Legacy ==
A number of his works are listed on the United States National Register of Historic Places (NRHP).

Hartmann's employees included Edward Lowenstein.

== Architectural works ==
- 1923: Jefferson Standard Building, Greensboro, North Carolina
  - NRHP-listed
- 1923: Radio Building, High Point, North Carolina
- 1924: Alamance Hotel, Burlington, North Carolina
  - NRHP-listed and contributes to the NRHP-listed Downtown Burlington Historic District
- 1926: Central Fire Station, Greensboro, North Carolina
  - NRHP-listed
- 1926: Citizens Bank Building, Rock Hill, South Carolina
  - Contributes to the NRHP-listed Rock Hill Downtown Historic District
- 1926: Highsmith Memorial Hospital (former), Fayetteville, North Carolina
  - As of 2026, home to Cumberland County Mental Health; contributes to the NRHP-listed Haymount District
- 1926: National Bank of Fayetteville Building, Fayetteville, North Carolina
  - Contributes to the NRHP-listed Market House Square District
- 1927: Greensboro Bank and Trust Building, Greensboro, North Carolina
- 1928: Rhyne Building, Lenoir–Rhyne University, Hickory, North Carolina
- 1929: Atlantic Bank and Trust Company Building, Burlington, North Carolina
  - NRHP-listed and contributes to the NRHP-listed Downtown Burlington Historic District
- 1929: James B. Dudley High School, Greensboro, North Carolina
  - NRHP-listed
- 1929: Grimsley High School, Greensboro, North Carolina
  - NRHP-listed
- 1929: Hillside, Greensboro, North Carolina
  - NRHP-listed
- 1929: F. W. Woolworth Company Building, Greensboro, North Carolina
  - In 1960 the Greensboro sit-ins began in this building, which is now the International Civil Rights Center and Museum; NRHP-listed
- 1930: Dudley Memorial Building, North Carolina A&T State University, Greensboro, North Carolina
  - Contributes to the NRHP-listed Agricultural and Technical College of North Carolina Historic District
- 1930: Person County Courthouse, Roxboro, North Carolina
  - NRHP-listed and contributes to the NRHP-listed Roxboro Commercial Historic District
- 1934: Pfeiffer Hall, Bennett College, Greensboro, North Carolina
  - Contributes to the NRHP-listed Bennett College historic district
- 1938: Country Club Condominiums, Greensboro, North Carolina
- 1946: Lexington Memorial Hospital, Lexington, North Carolina
  - NRHP-listed
