= Downtown Burlington Historic District =

Historic district in North Carolina, United States

- U.S. National Register of Historic Places
- U.S. Historic district
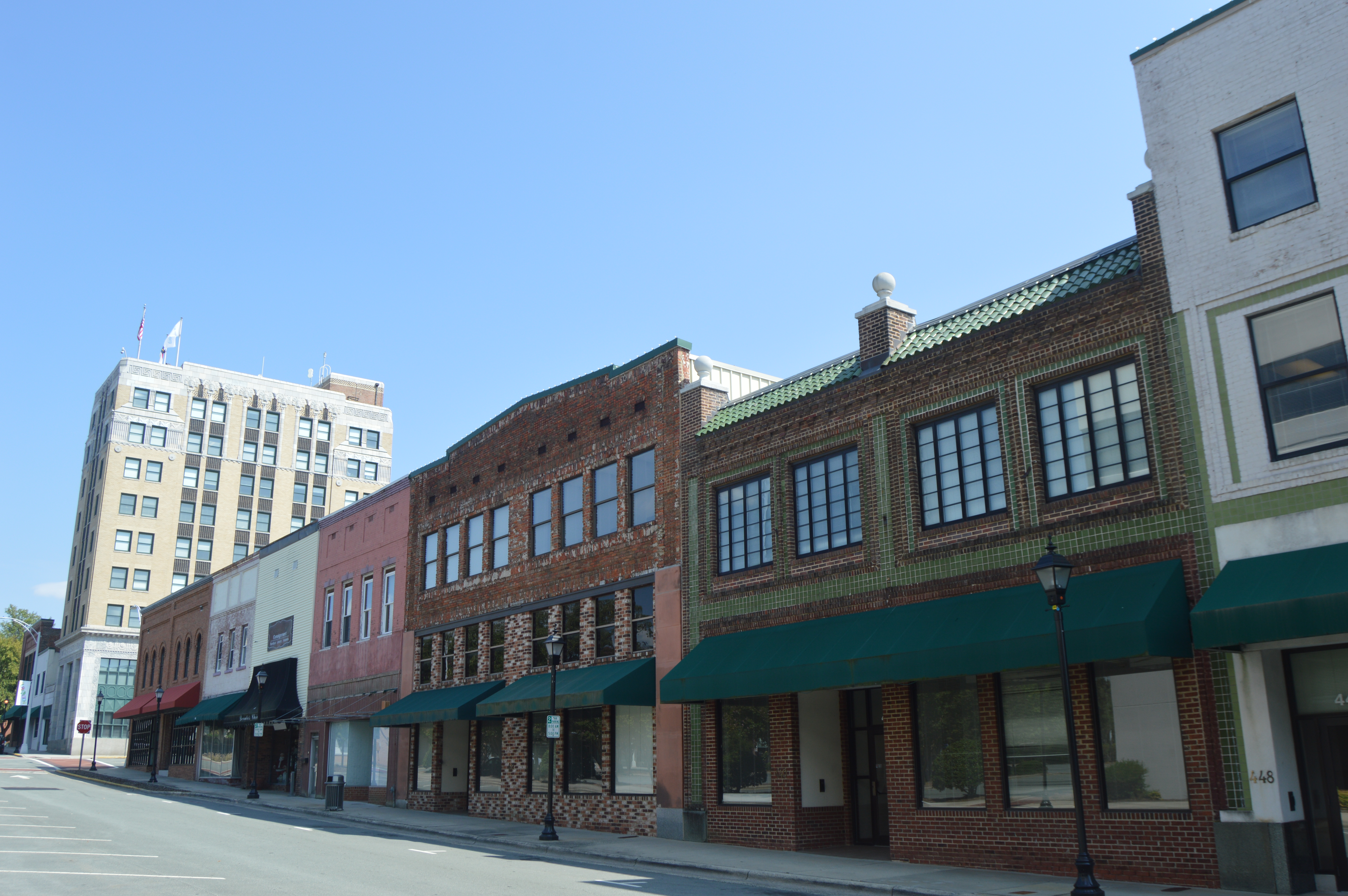
- Main Street, with the Atlantic B&T Building at left

- Location within North Carolina Location within the United States
- Location: Roughly bounded by Morehead, S. Main, Davis, S. Worth, E. Webb and Spring Sts., Burlington, North Carolina
- Coordinates: 36°05′33″N 79°26′18″W
- Area: 11 acres (4.5 ha)
- Built: 1892
- Architect: Charles Hartmann
- Architectural style: Classical Revival, Art Deco
- NRHP reference No.: 90001320
- Added to NRHP: September 6, 1990

Downtown Burlington Historic District is a national historic district located at Burlington, Alamance County, North Carolina, United States. It encompasses 40 contributing buildings in the central business district of Burlington, and was added to the National Register of Historic Places in 1990.

The district includes commercial, industrial, and transportation-related buildings. The majority of the buildings are one to three-story brick commercial buildings dating to the mid-19th and early-20th centuries. Among the buildings located in the district are:

- Alamance Hotel
- Atlantic Bank and Trust Company Building
- Efird Building
- Southern Railway Passenger Station
- United States Post Office

Other notable buildings include the former May Hosiery Mill, C. F. Neese Jewelers Building (1887), Strader Building (1913–1918), McClellan Stores Building (c. 1895), Troxler-Cammack Building (1908), and Morris Plan Bank Building (c. 1930).
