= 525 North Tryon =

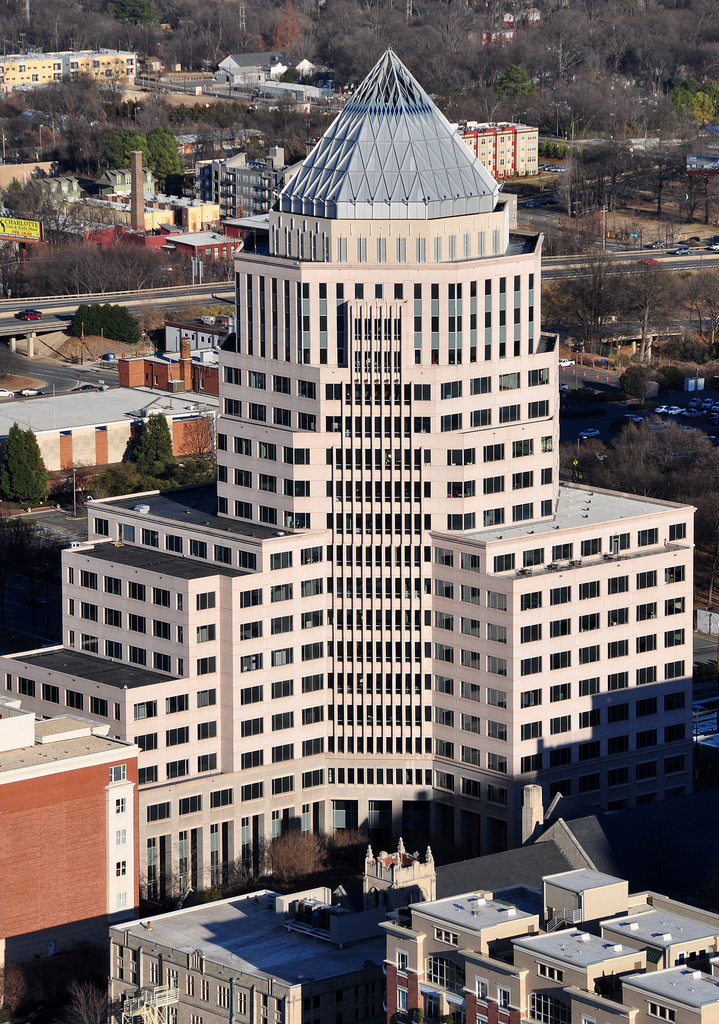
- Interactive map of the 525 North Tryon area

General information
- Status: Completed
- Type: Office
- Location: 525 North Tryon Street Charlotte, NC 28202
- Coordinates: 35°13′52″N 80°50′17″W
- Opening: 1998

Height
- Antenna spire: 330 feet (100 m)

Technical details
- Floor count: 19
- Floor area: 425,298 square feet (39,511.5 m^{2})

525 North Tryon (also known as Odell Plaza) is a 330 feet (101 m) office highrise located in the city of Charlotte, North Carolina. It is the 25th tallest building in Charlotte, and the 33rd tallest in North Carolina. It was built in 1999 and has 19 floors and 406,000 square feet (37,700 m^{2}). The building also includes a 607-car below-grade parking garage.

Located at North Tryon Street and Ninth Street, 525 North Tryon counts Bank of America and the Centralina Council of Governments as tenants. On December 3, 2012, Parkway Properties Inc. of Orlando, Florida announced its $47.4 million purchase of the building from First States Investors 5000A LLC.

In May 2025 the building was sold to Tennessee real estate firm Highland Ventures for $24 million. At the time of purchase the building was 46% occupied. At the time of purchase Highland Ventures announce their intention to renovate the building which will include the elevators, the lighting throughout the building, vacant ground-floor restaurant space, and adding a rooftop terrace. The building's ownership believes that with money a bit of money invested it can become a competitive property in the Uptown Charlotte office market. The renovations are expected to started near the end of 2025.

== See also ==
- List of tallest buildings in Charlotte
- List of tallest buildings in North Carolina
