= Guilford County Office and Court Building =

Historic building in North Carolina, US

- U.S. National Register of Historic Places
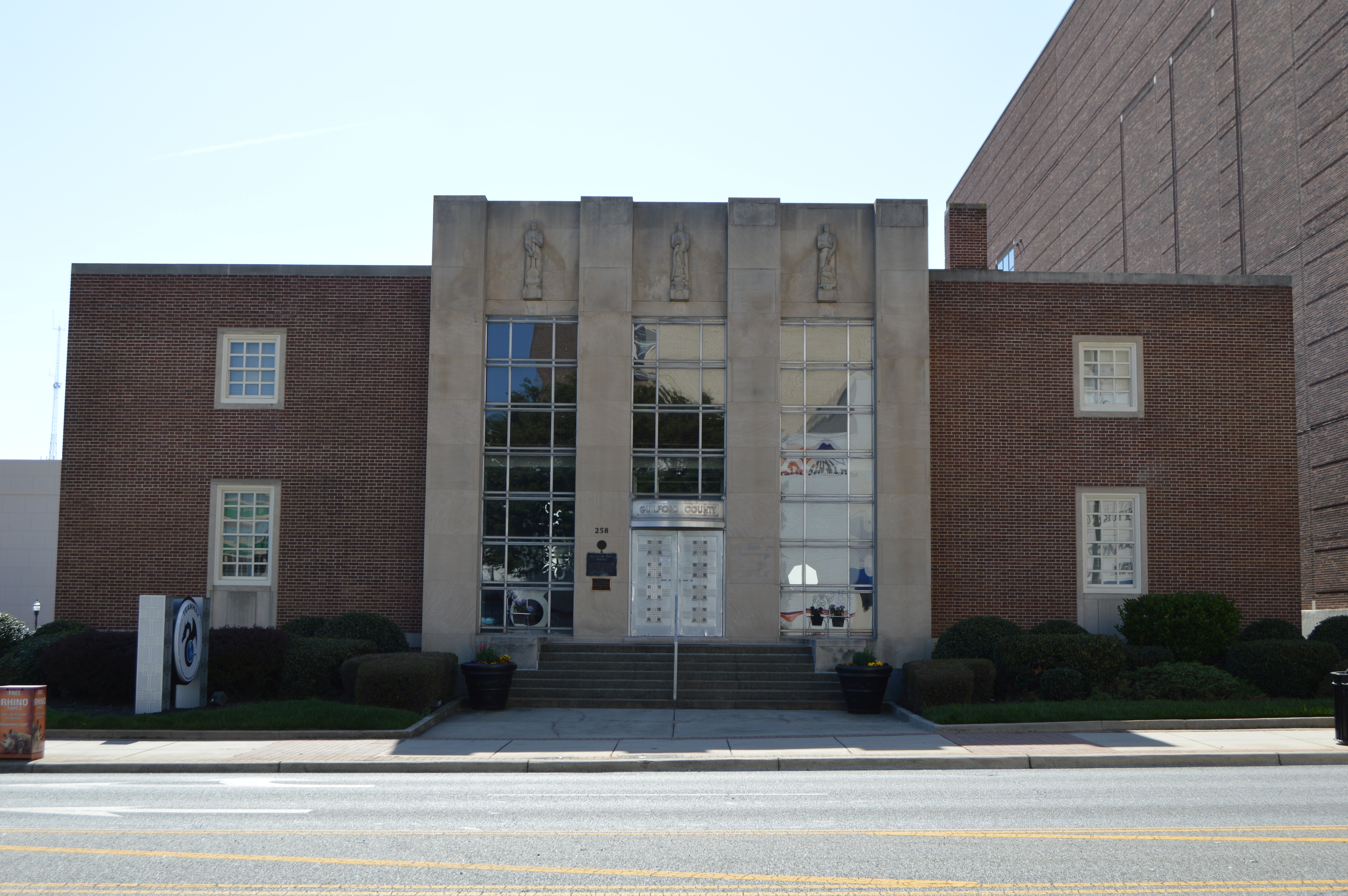
- Front

- Location within North Carolina Location within the United States
- Location: 258 S. Main St., High Point, North Carolina
- Coordinates: 35°57′14″N 80°0′20″W
- Area: 0.6 acres (0.24 ha)
- Built: 1937
- Built by: R.K. Sewart and Son
- Architect: Everhart & Voorhees
- Architectural style: Moderne
- NRHP reference No.: 88002843
- Added to NRHP: December 20, 1988

Guilford County Office and Court Building is a historic office and municipal and North Carolina Superior Court courthouse building located at Greensboro, Guilford County, North Carolina. It was built in 1937, and is a two-story, three part, Art Moderne-style brick building. It has a stylized entrance with three unornamented pilasters without capitals, which extend above the roofline.

It was listed on the National Register of Historic Places in 1988.
