= Edgar Allan Poe Museum =

Edgar Allan Poe Museum or Edgar Allan Poe House may refer to:

- Edgar Allan Poe House (Fayetteville, North Carolina)
- Edgar Allan Poe House (Lenoir, North Carolina)
- Edgar Allan Poe House and Museum, in Baltimore, Maryland
- Edgar Allan Poe Museum (Richmond, Virginia)

== See also ==
- Edgar Allan Poe Cottage, in the Bronx, New York
- Edgar Allan Poe National Historic Site, in Philadelphia, Pennsylvania
