= James Center =

Mixed-use complex in Richmond, Virginia

Coordinates: 37°32′12″N 77°26′14″W

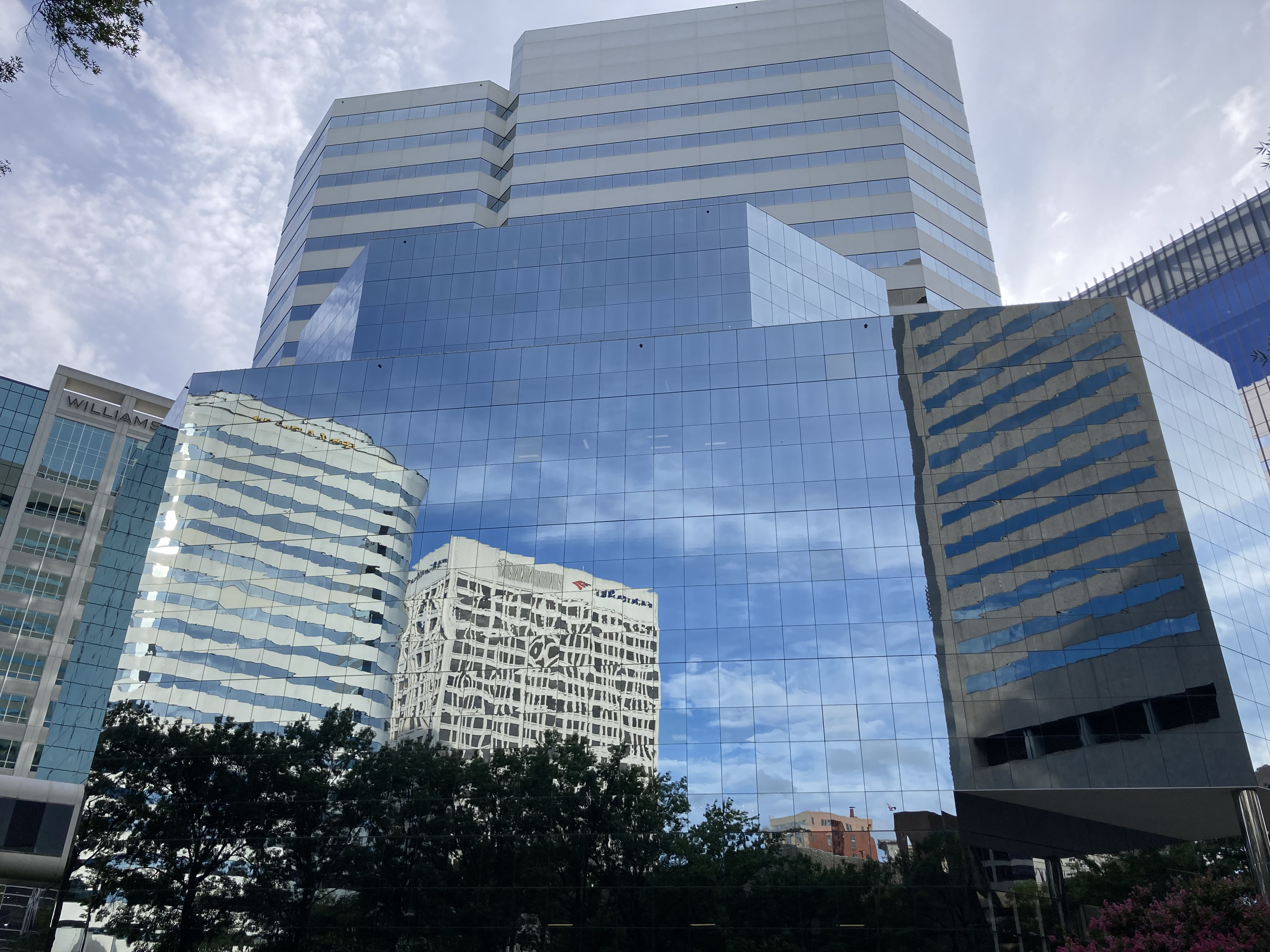
One James Center (HCA Healthcare building)

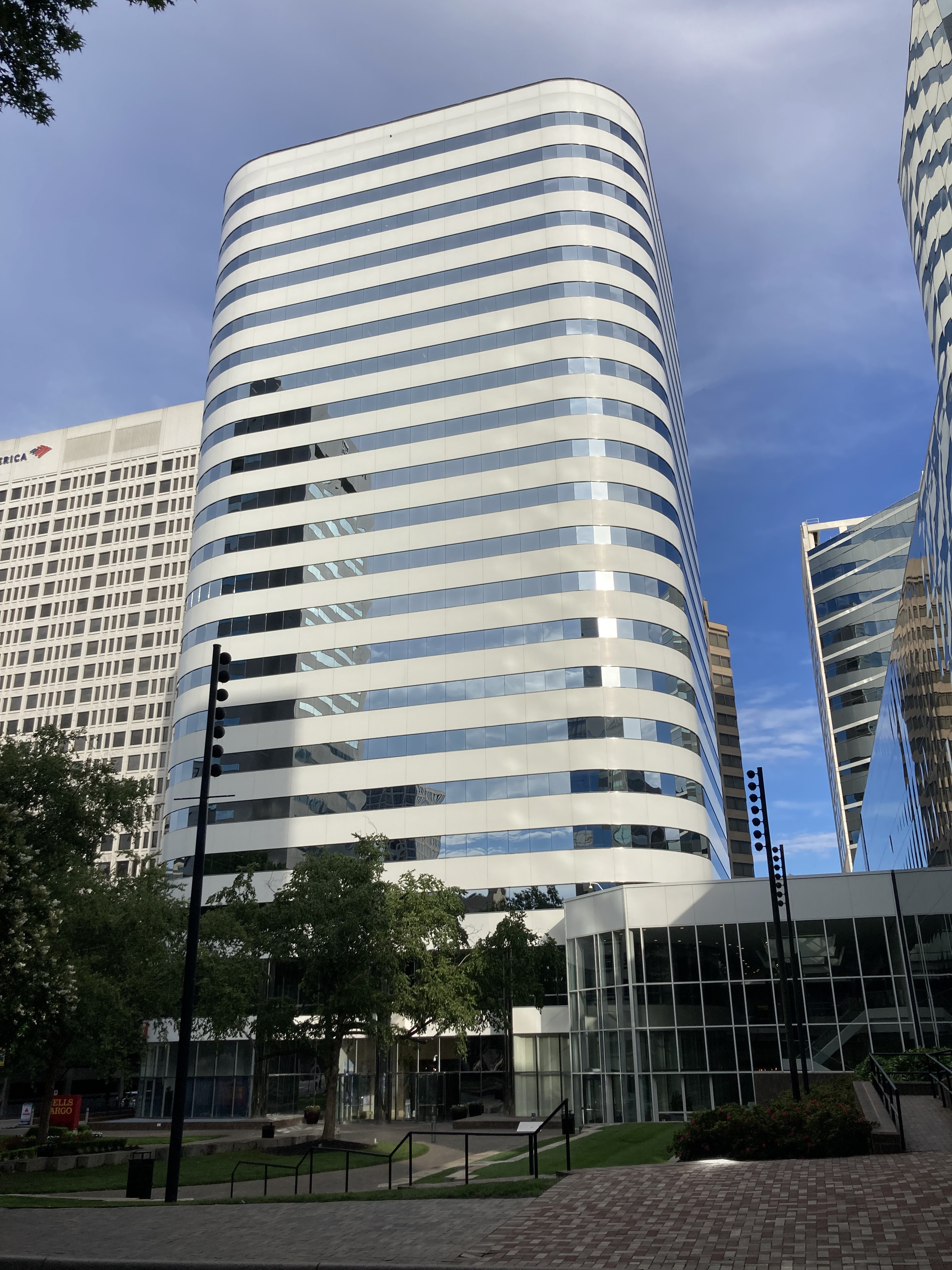
Two James Center (Wells Fargo building)

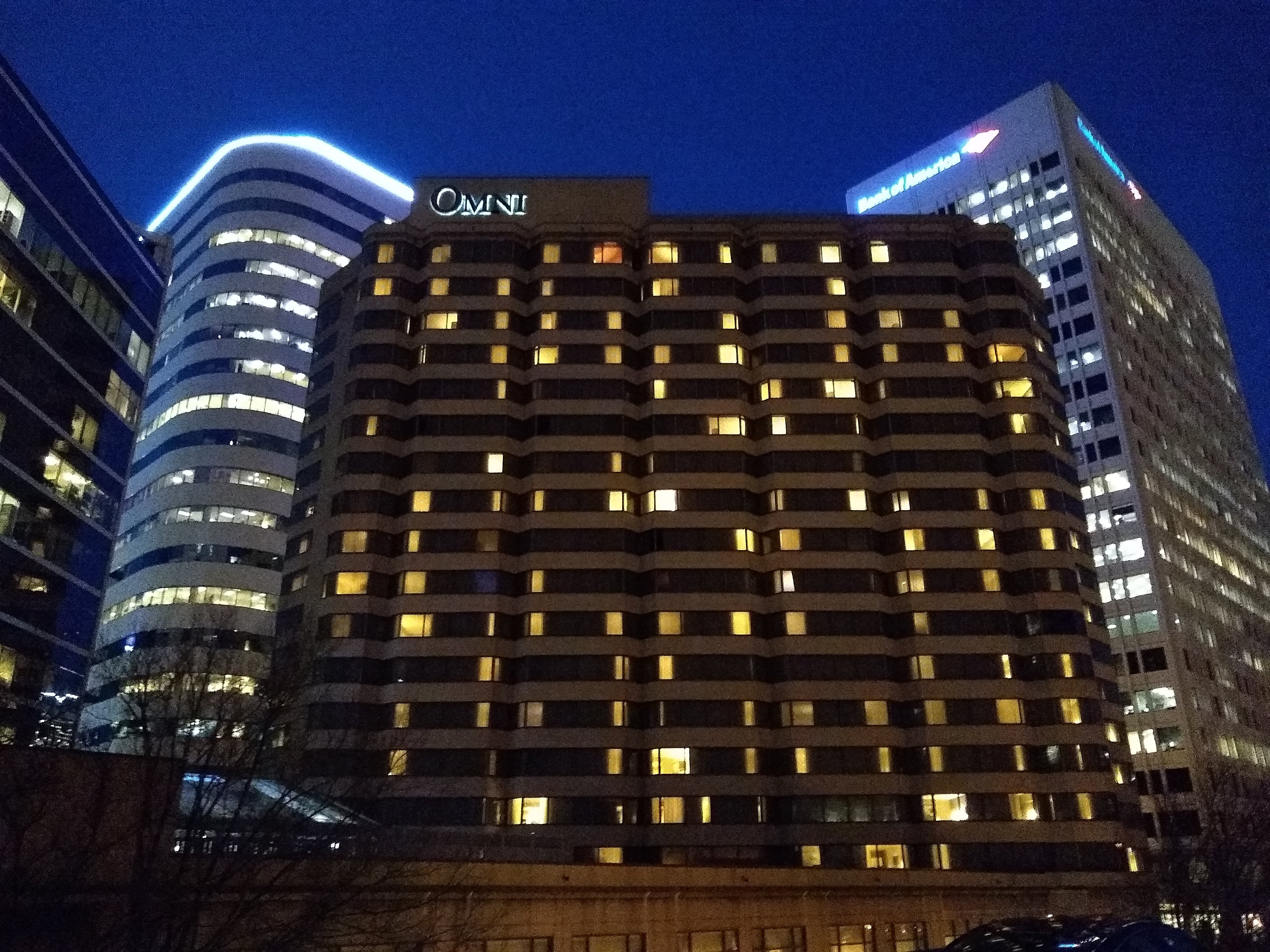
Omni Richmond Hotel

The James Center is a mixed-use complex of buildings located in Richmond, Virginia. The complex consists of three office buildings (One, Two, and Three James Center) and the Omni Hotel. Overall, the complex contains over 2.5 million square feet. The genesis of the James Center began in July 1970, when the Chesapeake and Ohio and Seaboard Coast Line railroad companies announced the creation of the James Center Development Company aimed at developing a 7.5 acre parcel of land in the downtown Richmond. This parcel of land was being used by the C&O as a railroad freight yard but was growing increasingly obsolete by nature of Richmond's slowing industrial capacities in the 1960s. The SCL was involved in the project due to its exchange of money to the C&O derived from the sale of the SCL's Byrd Street Station property. This sale involved the land which would become the Federal Reserve Bank of Richmond.

During the demolition of existing buildings to make way for the new complex, the Gallego Flour Mills were demolished in October 1970. These mills were first established around 1798 by Joseph Gallego, a Richmond merchant. They were successively burned down and reconstructed in the early 1800s, the 1820s, 1834, 1848, 1865, and 1903. In 1930, the mills closed down after the loss of water rights from the canal to the C&O.

The development took another fifteen years before the first building was completed. By 1987, all four buildings had been finished and were opened to their tenants. One James Center was initially known as the Dominion Bank building while Two James Center was known as the Central Fidelity Bank building. One James Center was later known as the First Union Bank building from 1993 to 2001, the McGuire Woods building from 2004 to 2015, and since 2020 has held the sign of HCA Healthcare. Two James Center was later known as the Central Fidelity Bank Building from 1993 to 1998, the Wachovia building from 1998 to 2008, and since 2008 has been known as the Wells Fargo Building.

== History ==
The land where the James Center is located was annexed to the city of Richmond in 1769. It was later to be chosen as the site for the Great Turning Basin for the James River and Kanawha Canal and was constructed as such in the late 1700s. The canal was a key mode of transportation in the 1800s but was extremely expensive to maintain, as seasonal floods often wiped out necessary locks and dumped sediment into the canal bed. In addition, railroads rapidly became the most expedient way to move passengers and freight across the country. By the late 1870s, the canal company had declared bankruptcy and was bought by the Richmond and Alleghany Railroad. The R&A built its track on top of the old canal tow-path and abandoned the canal bed. The turning basin in Richmond was filled in over time and became a yard for the railroad. In 1890, the R&A was bought by the new Chesapeake and Ohio Railway. Railroads across the country, including the C&O, reached their zenith serving the tremendous demands of the US war machine during World War II but were largely supplanted by the airline and automobile industries in the next few decades.
