= Rivergate Tower =

Skyscraper in Tampa, Florida

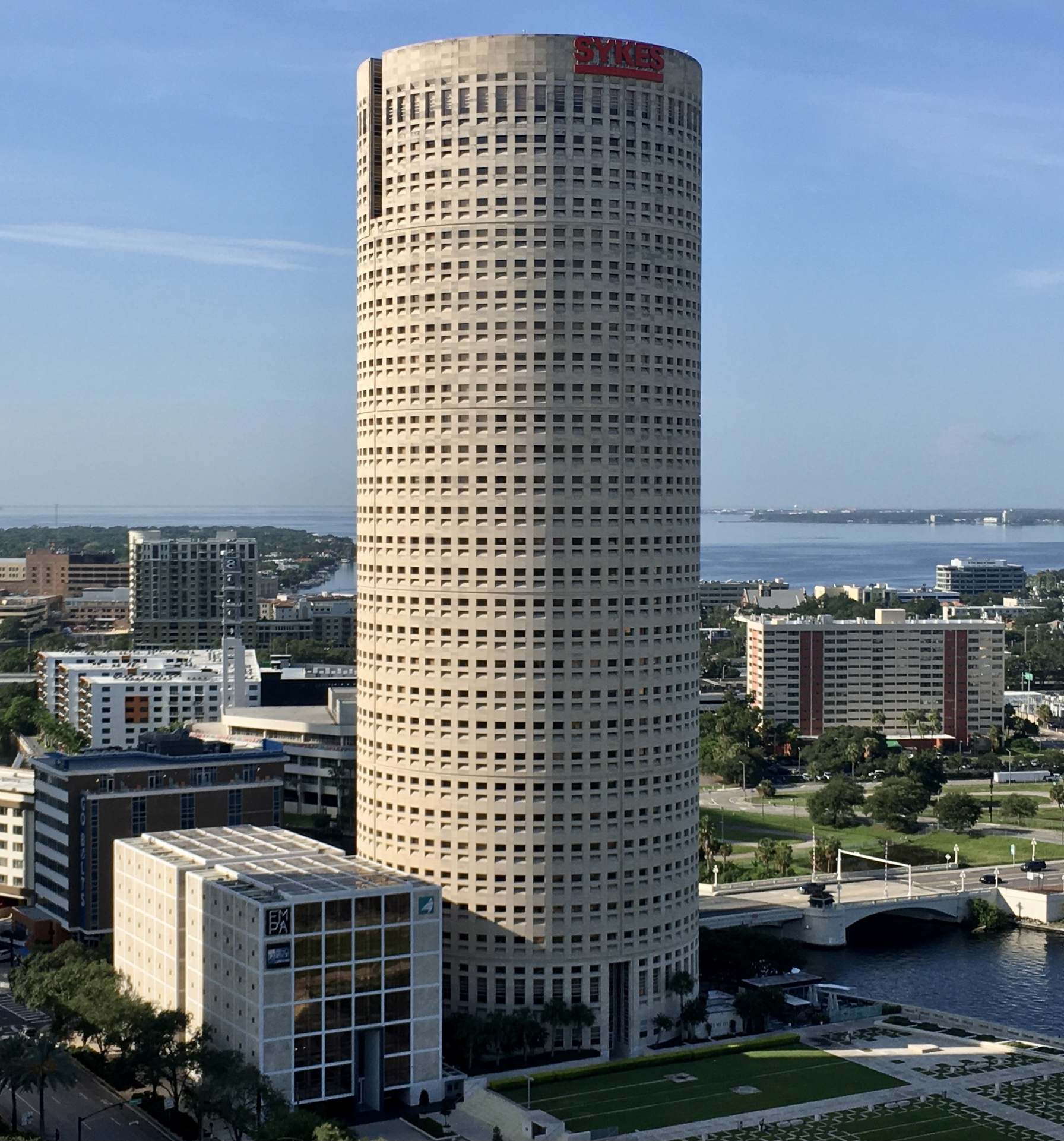
- Interactive map of the Rivergate Tower area

General information
- Type: Office
- Location: 400 North Ashley Drive, Tampa, Florida
- Coordinates: 27°56′50″N 82°27′38″W
- Construction started: 1986
- Completed: 1988
- Opening: 1988
- Cost: $150 million
- Owner: In-Rel Properties
- Management: In-Rel Properties

Height
- Roof: 454 ft (138 m)

Technical details
- Floor count: 31
- Floor area: 515,965 sq ft (47,934.7 m^{2})
- Lifts/elevators: 14

Design and construction
- Architect: Harry Wolf

The Rivergate Tower, also known as the Beer Can Building, is a 454-foot-tall (138 m) skyscraper in Tampa, Florida. The skyscraper is the seventh tallest building in Tampa with 31 floors. Rivergate Tower's principal tenant is SouthState Bank.

== History ==
The building was constructed in 1988 for $150 million as headquarters for North Carolina National Bank (NCNB), a predecessor to NationsBank. Parking is provided in a two-story sub-level structure with 731 spaces. The building was constructed from 1986 to 1988. Architect Harry Wolf based its measurements on the Fibonacci sequence, in which each number is the sum of the two preceding numbers, leaving each tile in the floor and each window pane is bigger than the ones next to it. The building is faced in French and Texas limestone, making it one of the tallest limestone structures in the world. The distinctive cylindrical shape was meant to symbolize a lighthouse on the Tampa skyline.

The building was purchased by In-Rel Properties at a foreclosure sale in 2011 for $22 million.

== Recognition ==
Harry Wolf's design for Rivergate Tower was given the 1993 National Honor Award from the American Institute of Architects (AIA).

On April 18, 2012, the American Institute of Architects's Florida Chapter placed the Rivergate Tower on its list of Florida Architecture: 100 Years. 100 Places.

== Neighboring structures ==
An adjacent cube-shaped building houses the Florida Museum of Photographic Arts along with a bank and a café. Just to the north of the tower is Curtis Hixon Waterfront Park, and just to the west is the Tampa Riverwalk on the Hillsborough River.

== See also ==
- List of tallest buildings in Tampa
- Downtown Tampa
