= Vernon Building =

Coordinates: 36.0704°N 79.7906°W

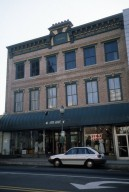
The Vernon Building

The Vernon Building is an Italianate style four-story mixed-used building in Greensboro, North Carolina. Built in 1883, it is the oldest building in downtown Greensboro.

== History ==
The first owner of the building was Will Armfield, who ran the Vanstory Clothing Company, which sold expensive men's clothing to customers in Guilford County and surrounding counties.

In 1887, the building was sold to Robert and Virginia Vernon. Robert Vernon was employed by a railroad. Virginia Vernon named the building "Vernon" and had the family name put on a cornice in gingerbread millwork.

Later, a W. T. Grant department store occupied the building. At a later date, the building next door, occupied by a Belk department store, was demolished to widen Washington Street.

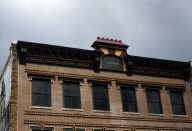
Detail of the building.

Virginia Vernon died at an unknown date (but after 1933) and records show the ownership of the building passing to two of her children, Will and Ernest. Will and Ernest Vernon were both childless, and after their deaths ownership passed to five cousins. The last remaining cousin, Ruth Best, sold the building.

In 1984, the Vernon Building was sold to the First South Properties, an arm of the First Baptist Church, for $167,500. In 1985, John Meier bought the building for $175,000. Meier and his wife Beverly operated Anna Marie, a retail and women's apparel manufacturing company. Meier was killed by bandits in 1992 while on a fabric buying trip to Guatemala and ownership passed to Beverly Meier. Beverly Meier married Victor Marcos in 1995.

The building was renovated in the 1990s, under the direction of Milton Kern. The Washington Street wall was removed to open the building for retail use on the first floor, the second and third floors were converted to apartments, and a penthouse was created on the fourth floor. Victor and Beverly Marcos lived in the penthouse.

In 1999, the Liberty Oak Restaurant moved into the building. Later, Vanecci Shoes, Salon Blu, and Hints occupied the building. In 2005, the Vernon Building was sold to Vernon Building, LLC, a company consisting of Dr. Joseph Weiss (a former psychiatrist) and other partners. In 2006, Victor and Beverly Marcos moved out of the building. In 2007, the Vernon Building was sold to Vernon Building II, LLC.

== Sources ==
- "Vernon Building". Walking Tour of Historical Downtown Greensboro, North Carolina. Greensboro Libraries.
- "About Us". Liberty Oak.
- Schlosser, Jim. "Just who was Vernon? The mystery is solved". News. www.news-record.com.
- Schlosser, Jim. "Downtown building dating to 19th century being sold". News. www.news-record.com.
