= Jefferson Standard Building =

- U.S. National Register of Historic Places
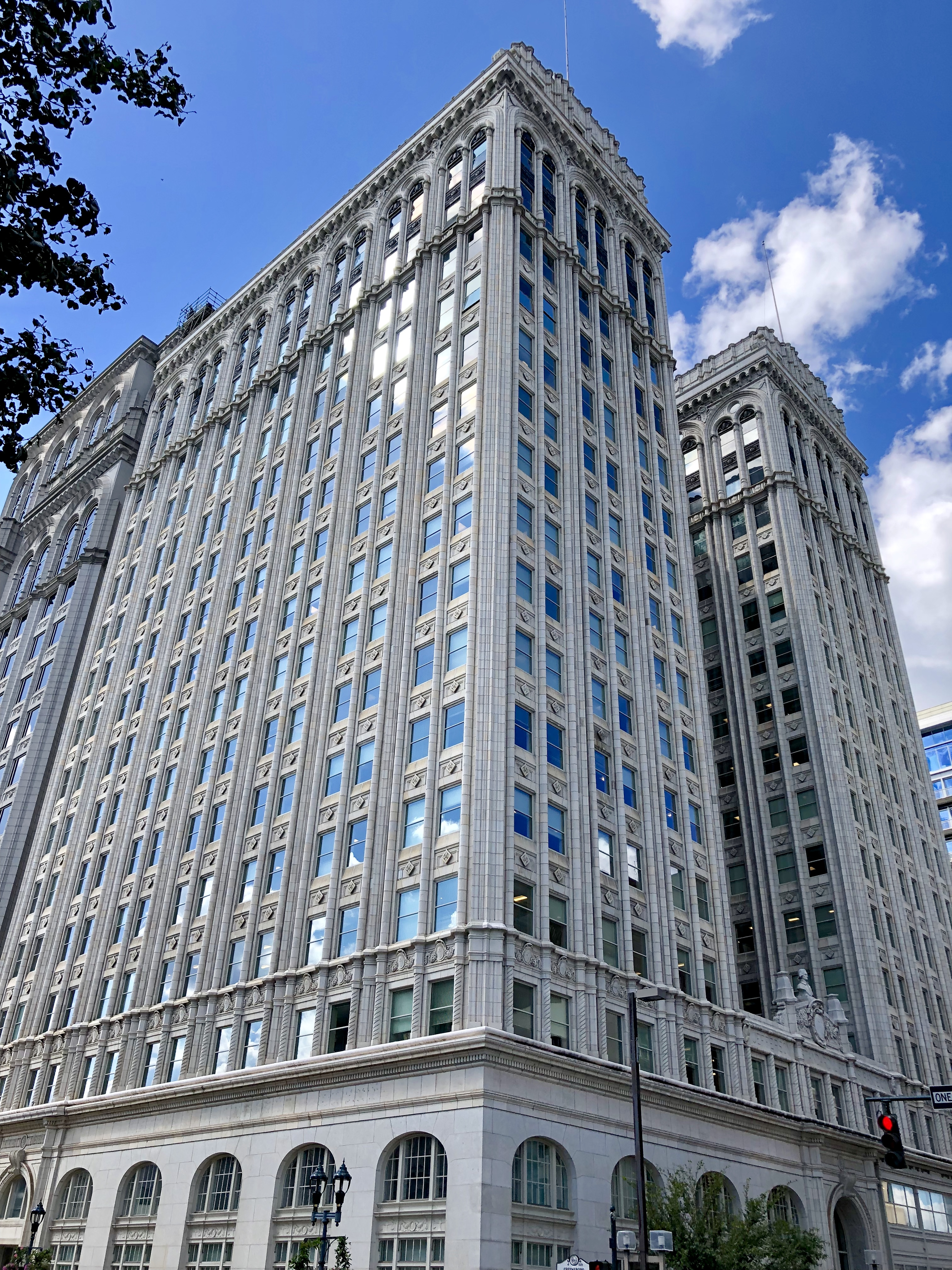
- The building in 2019

- Location within North Carolina Location within the United States
- Location: 101 N. Elm St, Greensboro NC 27401
- Coordinates: 36°4′22″N 79°47′32″W
- Built: 1922
- Architect: Hartmann, Charles C.
- Architectural style: Romanesque, Skyscraper
- NRHP reference No.: 76001326
- Added to NRHP: May 28, 1976

The Jefferson Standard Building is an 18-story skyscraper in Greensboro, North Carolina, completed in 1923 as the headquarters for Jefferson Standard Life Insurance Co., now the Lincoln Financial Group.

Until it was superseded by the Nissen Building in Winston-Salem in 1927, it was the tallest building in North Carolina, with an overall height of 374 ft (114m), succeeding the Independence Building in Charlotte. At completion, it was the tallest building between Washington, D.C., and Atlanta, Georgia, and was named to the National Register of Historic Places in 1976.

A 20-story addition, first known as the Jefferson-Pilot Building and later the Lincoln Financial Building, opened in 1990.

== History ==
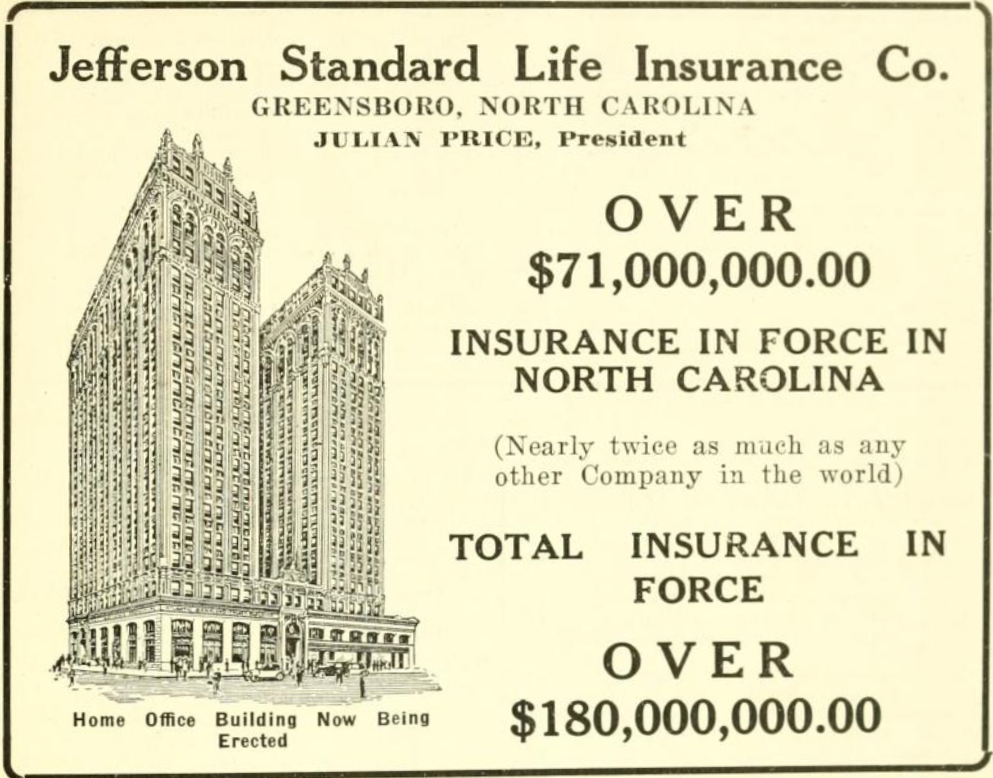
1923 advertisement showing the building, then under construction

Julian Price, president of Jefferson Standard Life Insurance, asked New York City architect Charles C. Hartmann to design his company's new headquarters, paying for the building in full because he was himself debt-averse.

Architecturally, the building using a U-shape to allow more light and air, recalling Atlanta's Equitable Building. Themes include Neo-Gothic, Neo-Classical and Art Deco. The exterior is terra cotta and granite, with the terra cotta incorporating Beaux-Arts and Romanesque themes. The main entrance features a bust of Thomas Jefferson, for whom the company is named, as well as Buffalo nickels on either side of ground floor windows, symbolizing thrift and economy. The corridors used "23 carloads of marble".

In 1930, Jefferson Standard gained a controlling interest in Pilot Life Insurance Co. In 1967, Pilot Life Insurance Co. and Jefferson Standard became a single entity named Jefferson-Pilot Corporation. At that time, 800 Pilot Life employees moved from several Pilot Life buildings, in Sedgefield, North Carolina (dating to the 1920s) into the Jefferson Standard Building and later its 1990 20-story addition.

Jefferson-Pilot merged with Lincoln Financial Group in 2006. The Greensboro buildings remained the headquarters for the company's life insurance operations, though the company headquarters moved to Philadelphia.

In October 2009, a limited edition cover of Acme Comics G-Man Cape Crisis #2 showed the 1990 Lincoln Financial insurance division headquarters (formerly the Jefferson-Pilot Building), with G-Man fighting the Acme Bat. Chris Giarusso drew the cover, which recalled Superman fighting Spider-Man in 1976. A special appearance by Giarusso at the Greensboro Acme Comics store marked the cover's release on October 24. Also present were Gregg Schigiel (whose work includes SpongeBob SquarePants), Jacob Chabot (Mighty Skullboy Army), Brian Smith (Stuff of Legend) and Art Baltazar (Tiny Titans).

== Lincoln Financial Building ==
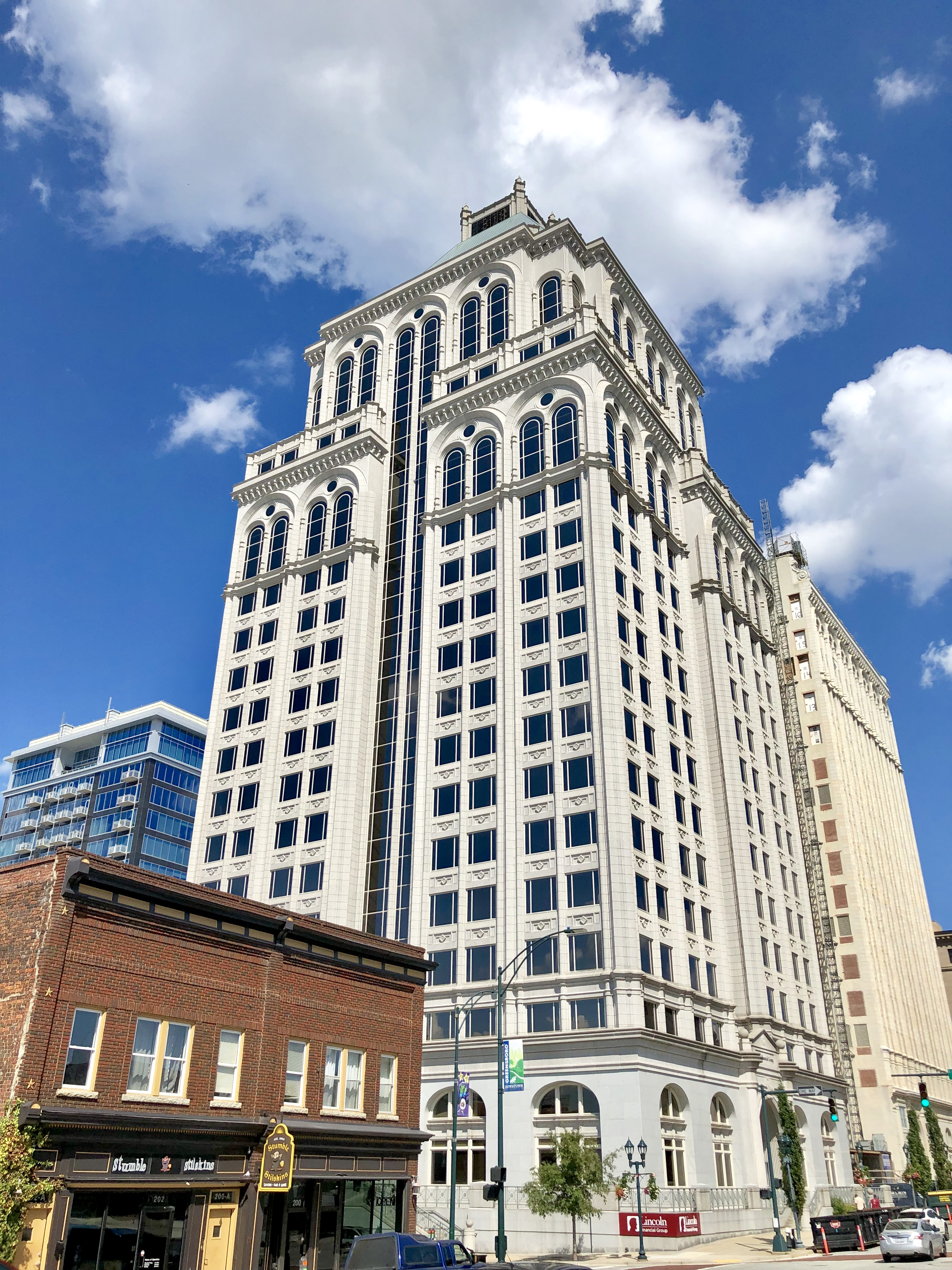
The Lincoln Financial Building, built as an addition to the Jefferson Standard Building

A 20-story addition to the Jefferson Standard Building, officially known as the Lincoln Financial Building, opened in 1990. Originally known as the Jefferson-Pilot Building, the 384,993 ft² building was designed by the architectural firm Smallwood, Reynolds, Stewart, Stewart and constructed by the Hardin Construction Group. The Lincoln Financial Building, which is the tallest building in Greensboro, was constructed in a Gothic Revival architecture style to match the existing Jefferson Standard Building, a rarity for buildings constructed at the end of the 20th century.
