= Fayetteville Cubs =

- 1946–1948; (1946–1952); Fayetteville, North Carolina

Minor league affiliations
- Class: Class D (1946, 1949); Class B (1947–1948, 1950–1952)
- League: Coastal Plain League (1946); Tri-State League (1947–1948); Tobacco State League (1949); Carolina League (1950–1952)

Major league affiliations
- Team: Chicago Cubs (1946–1948); Philadelphia Athletics (1950–1952)

Minor league titles
- League titles (1): 1948
- Wild card berths (1): 1948

Team data
- Name: Fayetteville Cubs (1946–1948); Fayetteville Scotties (1949); Fayetteville Athletics (1950–1952)
- Ballpark: Pittman Stadium (1946–1952)

The Fayetteville Cubs were a minor league baseball team based in Fayetteville, North Carolina. From 1946 to 1948, the Fayetteville "Cubs" played as members of the Coastal Plain League (1946) and Tri-State League (1947–1948) as a minor league affiliate of the Chicago Cubs. The Fayetteville Cubs won the 1948 Tri-State League championship.

The Fayetteville Cubs were immediately followed in minor league play by the Fayetteville "Scotties" of the 1949 Tobacco State League and the Fayetteville "Athletics" of the 1950–1952 Carolina League. The Athletics were a minor league affiliate of the Philadelphia Athletics.

The Fayetteville teams in the era hosted minor league home games at the newly built Cumberland County Memorial Stadium, which was later renamed to Pittman Stadium.

== History ==
=== Early Fayetteville teams ===
Minor league baseball began in Fayetteville with the 1909 Fayetteville Highlanders, who began a tenure of minor league play in joining the Eastern Carolina League, The Highlanders won the 1910 Eastern Carolina Association championship, with Jim Thorpe, Olympic Champion and Pro Football Hall of Fame member on the roster.

The Cubs were preceded in minor league play by the 1929 Fayetteville Highlanders who played in the final season of the Eastern Carolina League.

=== 1946 to 1948: Fayetteville Cubs / Coastal Plain League & Tri-State League ===
The Fayetteville "Cubs" resumed minor league play in 1946, playing as members of the reformed Coastal Plain League as a minor league affiliate of the Chicago Cubs. The Goldsboro Goldbugs (Boston Red Sox affiliate), Greenville Greenies, Kinston Eagles, New Bern Bears, Rocky Mount Rocks, Tarboro Tars and Wilson Tobs teams joined with Fayetteville in beginning league play on May 2, 1946.

The Fayetteville Cubs began playing at Cumberland County Memorial Stadium, drawing over 77,000 fans despite a last place finish in their first season of play. Fayetteville ended the 1946 Coastal Plain League regular season with a final record of 51–75 to place eighth in the eight-team league, playing under managers John Intlekofer and Don Anderson. The Cubs finished 23.5 games behind the first place Rocky Mount Rocks in the regular season standings. Fayetteville did not qualify for the four-team playoffs won by the Rocky Mount Rocks.

In 1947, the Cubs did not return to the Coastal Plain League and instead continued minor league play as new members of the Tri-State League. The league Tri-State League expanded from six teams to eight teams, as the Reidsville Luckies joined Fayetteville as the two new teams in the league. Reidsville and Fayetteville joined with the Anderson Rebels, Asheville Tourists (Brooklyn Dodgers affiliate), Charlotte Hornets (Washington Senators), Knoxville Smokies, Rock Hill Chiefs and Spartanburg Peaches (Cleveland Indians) in beginning Tri-State League play on April 15, 1947.

Following his honorable discharge from the U.S. Army in 1947, Rocky Marciano traveled to Fayetteville with friends to try out for the Fayetteville Cubs team before the season began. Marciano lasted three weeks before being cut from the team. He then returned home to Brockton, Massachusetts and began his professional boxing career.

In their first season of Tri-State League play the Cubs finished in seventh place, ending the 1947 season with a record of 61–78 under manager Clyde McDowell. The Cubs finished the regular season 27.0 games behind the first place Spartanburg Peaches. Fayetteville, with their seventh-place finish, did not qualify for the four-team playoffs won by the Charlotte Hornets.

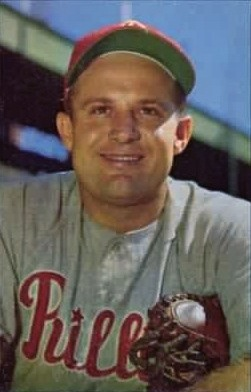
(1953) Smoky Burgess, Philadelphia Athletics. Burgess won the 1947 Tri-State League batting championship while playing for the Fayetteville Cubs.

Fayetteville's Smokey Burgess won the 1947 Tri-State League batting championship with a .387 batting average. Burgess then led the Southern Association with a .386 average, in 1948 after leaving Fayetteville. A member of the Cincinnati Reds Hall of fame and a 9 time major league All-Star, Burgess had returned to professional baseball with Fayetteville after serving in the U.S. Army during World War II. In his service, Burgess was injured in a military automobile incident in Germany, severely injuring his throwing shoulder.

Skeeter Scalzi became the Fayetteville Cubs manager in 1948. With a brief major league playing career, Scalzi played 17 seasons in minor league baseball and also managed in the minor leagues for 12 seasons. Scalzi had been a player/manager for the Hopkinsville Hoppers in 1947 in his first manager role, before joining Fayetteville for his second player/manager dual position at age 35.

With Scalzi as player/manager, the Fayetteville Cubs captured the 1948 Tri-State League championship. With a fourth place finish and a 73–71 record, the Cubs qualified for the playoffs as player/manager Skeeter Scalzi hit .321 on the season. The Cubs ended the regular season 21.0 games behind the first place Asheville Tourists. In the playoffs, Fayetteville defeated the Anderson Rebels 3 games to 1 in the first round to advance. In the final, Fayetteville defeated the Rock Hill Chiefs 4 games to 1 to win the league championship. Fayettsville's Floyd Fogg had 144 RBI, to lead the Tri-State League. Cubs' pitcher Bob Spicer had an 18-4 record to lead all league pitchers.

After a hand injury hampered and shortened his playing career, Floyd Fogg returned to his native Louisiana. There he helped to establish the Slidell Bantam Baseball Association youth organization. Fogg remained active with the youth baseball players and was still conducting hitting clinics at his backyard batting cage until his death in 2018 at age 91.

=== 1949 Fayetteville Scotties ===
Despite winning the league title the season before, Fayetteville did not return to the 1949 Tri-State League, replaced by the unaffiliated Sumter Chicks franchise in the league. The Chicago Cubs did not have an affiliate team in the 1949 league.

Leaving the Tri-State League and becoming unaffiliated, the 1949 team continued play known as the Fayetteville "Scotties." The Scotties played as one season as a member of Class D level Tobacco State League. Fayetteville replaced the Warsaw Red Sox franchise in the league. The Scotties joined the Clinton Sampson Blues, Dunn-Erwin Twins, Lumberton Auctioneers, Red Springs Red Robins (Philadelphia Athletics affiliate), Sanford Spinners, Smithfield-Selma Leafs and Wilmington Pirates teams in beginning Tobacco State League play on April 20, 1949.

The Scotties ended the 1949 season in sixth place in the Tobacco State League final standings. Fayetteville ended the season with a record of 61–76, playing under managers Zip Payne, Joe Roseberry, Nicholas Rhabe and John Helms. The Scotties finished 21.0 games behind the first place Dunn-Erwin Twins in the regular season final standings. Fayetteville did not qualify for the four-team playoffs won by the Red Springs Red Robins. Fayetteville player/manager Joe Rosenberry won the Tobacco State League batting title, hitting .409. Teammate and player/manager John Helms tied for the league lead with 15 home runs.

=== 1950 to 1952: Fayetteville Athletics (A's) / Carolina League ===
The Fayetteville "Athletics" (or the interchangeable "A's") began play in the 1950 Carolina League as a minor league affiliate of the Philadelphia Athletics. Fayetteville replaced the Martinsville Athletics as the Philadelphia Athletics' affiliate in the Carolina League. The Burlington Bees, Danville Leafs, Durham Bulls (Detroit Tigers affiliate), Greensboro Patriots, Raleigh Capitals, Reidsville Luckies, Winston-Salem Cardinals (St. Louis Cardinals) teams joined with Fayetteville in beginning league play on April 19, 1950.

Named to manage the Fayetteville Athletics in 1950, former player Mule Haas won two world series while playing with the 1929 and 1930 Philadelphia Athletics. In 1929, Haas was one of six Athletics players to post batting averages above .310 with a batting average of .323, while hitting 16 home runs with 82 RBI. The Athletics won the 1929 American League pennant by 18 games over the New York Yankees with Babe Ruth and Lou Gehrig. In the 1929 World Series against the Chicago Cubs, Haas hit a three-run inside-the-park home run as the Athletics rallied by scoring ten runs in the inning to win, 10–8. In the final game of the 1929 World Series, Haas hit a two-run home run in the bottom of the ninth inning to tie the score, 2–2, as the Athletics later won the game and the championship.

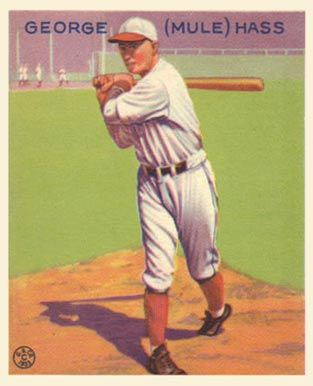
(1933) Mule Haas, Chicago White Sox, Goudey baseball card. Haas managed for the Fayetteville Athletics in 1950.

Haas came to Fayetteville after having managed the Hollywood Stars of the Pacific Coast League in 1948 and the Montgomery Rebels of the Class B level Southeastern League in 1949. After a poor managerial record with Fayetteville, Haas never managed in the minor leagues again. Haas returned to his hometown of Montclair, New Jersey and became the athletic director at the Fort Montclair Army base, coaching Fort Montclair Army Signaleers basketball and baseball teams. One of his players was future Yankee pitcher and Baseball Hall of Fame member Whitey Ford.

With Haas beginning the season as manager, the Fayetteville Athletics finished in last place in the 1950 Carolina League. The Athletics compiled a record final record of 47–106, finishing in eighth place. Fayetteville played the season under managers Mule Haas (3–20), John Miller (1–1) and Tom Oliver (43-85). The Athletics finished 59.0 games behind the first place Winston-Salem Cardinals team. With their eighth-place finish, Fayetteville did not qualify for the four-team playoffs won by Winston-Salem.

The Athletics improved to a seventh-place finish in continuing play in the 1951 Carolina League. Fayetteville had a regular season record of 59–79 in 1951, improving to seventh place, playing the season under manager Red Norris. Fayetteville ended the season 24.0 games behind the first place Durham Bulls. Fayetteville did not qualify for the playoffs, won by the Winston-Salem Cardinals for the second consecutive season.

The 1952 Fayetteville Athletics played their last season known at the "Athletics" and again finished in seventh place in the 1952 Carolina League. Playing under managers Red Norris (42–42) and Ducky Detweiler (21–31), the Athletics ended the season with a record of 63–73. Finishing in seventh place, Fayetteville ended the season 16.0 games behind first place Raleigh Capitals, drawing 58,203 fans for the season.

Fayetteville pitcher Len Matarazzo compiled a 22–8 win–loss record with the Athletics and was selected as the Carolina League Most Valuable Player. After his season with Fayetteville, Matarazzo was promoted to the Philadelphia Athletics roster in September. Matarazzo made his major league debut on September 6, 1952, pitching a scoreless inning against the Boston Red Sox at Fenway Park. Matarazzo played for Fayetteville again in 1953 and retired from baseball after the 1954 season.

Fayetteville manager Ducky Detweiler served as player/manager for the last season in his professional baseball career in 1952. He returned to managing after serving as player/manager of the 1950 Red Springs Red Robins in the Tobacco State League. Detweiler paused his baseball career as he served during World War II in the U.S. Army from 1943 to 1945. Detweiller was first assigned to the 1301st Service Unit, and also played for the New Cumberland Reception Center baseball team with teammates Tommy Hughes, Pat Mullin, Fred Caligiuri and Harry Marnie. Detwiler was transferred to Camp Siebert in Alabama, a training center for the Chemical Warfare Service and along with Hughes, Mullin and Steve Sundra, he played with the "Camp Siebert Gashouse Gang" team between 1944 and 1945 while in service. After retiring from baseball, with Fayetteville, Detweiler operated a tavern called "Ducky's Tavern" in Easton, Maryland from 1960 to 1969, while also becoming a letter carrier for the U.S. Postal Service, giving 20 years of service in that role before his retirement. In 1995, Ducky Detweiler was inducted into the Eastern Shore Baseball Hall of Fame.

The Fayetteville team became known under their original nickname while continuing play in the 1953 Carolina League. The team remained an affiliate of the Philadelphia Athletics and became known as Fayetteville "Hilanders" again. The Highlanders won the 1953 Carolina League championship. The Hilanders later won another Carolina League championship in 1956. The Hilanders were affiliates of the Baltimore Orioles (1955) and Cleveland Indians (1956) in their tenure of league play. Today, the Fayetteville Woodpeckers, who began play in 2019, continue minor league play as a member of the Class A Carolina League.

== The ballpark ==
Beginning in 1946, Fayetteville teams hosted minor league home games at the newly constructed Pittman Stadium. The ballpark had a capacity of 4,000 (1950) and dimensions of (Left, Center, Right): 350-400-330. It was located on Bragg Boulevard in Fayetteville.

The ballpark was built on farmland and was originally called Cumberland County Memorial Stadium. The ballpark was constructed of cinderblocks and contained wooden bleachers, with a press box on the roof of the grandstand. After the 1956 minor league season, the Fayetteville team folded, and the ballpark was no longer used. The parcel first became a small golf course and housed then a dirt racetrack. Today, the site is an auto dealership. The ballpark was located near the intersection of Skibo Road and Bragg Boulevard in Fayetteville, North Carolina.

== Timeline ==
Year(s)	# Yrs.	Team	Level	League	Affiliate	Ballpark
1946	1	Fayetteville Cubs	Class D	Coastal Plain League	Chicago Cubs	Pittman Stadium
1947–1948	2	Fayetteville Cubs	Class B	Tri-State League	Chicago Cubs	Pittman Stadium
1949	1	Fayetteville Scotties	Class D	Tobacco State League	None	Pittman Stadium
1950	1	Fayetteville Athletics	Class B	Carolina League	Philadelphia Athletics	Pittman Stadium

== Year–by–year records ==
Year	Record	Finish	Manager	Playoffs/Notes
Fayetteville Cubs (Coastal Plain League)
1946	51–75	8th	John Intlekofer / Don Anderson	Did not qualify
(Tri-State League)
1947	61–78	7th	Clyde McDowell	Did not qualify
1948	73–71	4th	Skeeter Scalzi	League champions
Fayetteville Scotties (Tobacco State League)
1949	61–76	6th	Zip Payne / Joe Roseberry; Nicholas Rhabe / John Helms	Did not qualify
Fayetteville Athletics (Carolina League)
1950	47–106	8th	Mule Haas (3–20) / John Miller (1–1); Tom Oliver (43-85)	Did not qualify
1951	59–79	7th	Red Norris	Did not qualify
1952	63–73	7th	Red Norris (42–42) / Ducky Detweiler (21–31)	Did not qualify

== Notable alumni ==
- Jim Brosnan (1948)
- Smoky Burgess (1947) Cincinnati Reds Hall of Fame
- Ducky Detweiler (1952, MGR)
- Mule Haas (1950, MGR)
- Bill Harrington (1950–1951)
- Mike Kume (1950)
- Rocky Marciano (1947)* Champion boxer
- Len Matarazzo (1951–1952)
- Len Okrie (1947)
- Tom Oliver (1950, MGR)
- Charlie Osgood (1947)
- Jim Pearce (1947)
- Les Peden (1948)
- Arnie Portocarrero (1950)
- Fred Richards (1947–1948)
- Skeeter Scalzi (1948, MGR)
- Bob Spicer (1948)

== See also ==
- Fayetteville Cubs players
- Fayetteville A's players
- Fayetteville, North Carolina minor league baseball history
- Carolina League Most Valuable Player Award
