= Whiteville Tobs =

- 1950; Whiteville, North Carolina

Minor league affiliations
- Class: Class D (1950)
- League: Tobacco State League (1950)

Major league affiliations
- Team: None

Minor league titles
- League titles (0): None

Team data
- Name: Whiteville Tobs (1950)
- Ballpark: Legion Memorial Field (1950)

The Whiteville Tobs were a minor league baseball team based in Whiteville, North Carolina. In 1950, the Tobs played a partial season as members of the Class D level Tobacco State League in the final season of the league, hosting home games at Legion Memorial Field.

== History ==
Whiteville, North Carolina first hosted minor league play in 1950, when the Whiteville "Tobs" became members of the eight–team Class D level Tobacco State League during the last season of the league. The "Tobs" nickname is a shortened version of "tobacconists," common in the region in the era.

After beginning play mid-season, the Angier–Fuquay Springs Bulls, Clinton Sampson Blues, Lumberton Auctioneers, Red Springs Red Robins, Rockingham Eagles, Sanford Spinners, Smithfield–Selma Leafs and Wilmington Pirates teams joined Whiteville in Tobacco State League play.

During the 1950, season, the Dunn–Erwin Twins team relocated to Whiteville and finished last in the Tobacco State League standings. On June 16, 1950, the Dunn-Erwin Twins moved to Whiteville, North Carolina, with a record of 11–34. Finishing the season as the Whiteville Tobs, the team compiled a record of 28–48 based in Whiteville. Overall, the team finished with a record of 39–92, to place eighth, missing the Tobacco State League playoffs. Playing under manager Jim Staton, the Twins/Tobs finished 51.0 games behind the first place Lumberton Auctioneers. Granville Denning led the Tobacco State League in batting average, hitting .374 with 174 hits. The Twins/Tobs team failed to qualify for the playoffs, won by the Rockingham Eagles. The Tobacco State League permanently folded following the 1950 season.

Whiteville, North Carolina has not hosted another minor league team.

== The ballpark ==
The Whiteville Tobs hosted home minor league games at Legion Memorial Field. Still in use today by Whiteville High School sports teams, Legion Memorial Stadium is located at 413 North Lee Street, Whiteville, North Carolina.

== Year–by–year record ==
Year	Record	Finish	Manager	Playoffs/Notes
1950	39–92	8th	Jim Staton	Dunn-Erwin (11–34) moved to Whiteville June 16
