= Warsaw Red Sox =

- 1947–1948; Warsaw, North Carolina

Minor league affiliations
- Class: Class D (1947–1948)
- League: Tobacco State League (1947–1948)

Major league affiliations
- Team: None

Minor league titles
- League titles (0): None

Team data
- Name: Warsaw Red Sox (1947–1948)
- Ballpark: Warsaw Park (1947–1948)

The Warsaw Red Sox were a minor league baseball team based in Warsaw, North Carolina. From 1947 to 1948, the Warsaw Red Sox played exclusively as members of the Class D level Tobacco State League, hosting home minor league games at Warsaw Park.

== History ==
Warsaw, North Carolina first hosted minor league play in 1947. The Warsaw "Red Sox" began play as members of the eight–team Class D level Tobacco State League. The Clinton Blues, Dunn-Erwin Twins, Lumberton Cubs, Red Springs Red Robins, Sanford Spinners, Smithfield-Selma Leafs and Wilmington Pirates joined Lumberton in the second season of Tobacco League play.

The 1947 league accepted applications and expanded from six to eight teams, adding the Lumberton, Red Springs and Warsaw franchises as new members for the 1947 season, with the Angier-Fuquay Springs Bulls franchise folding.

In 1947, S.W. Marriner was reported to be president of the Warsaw Red Sox, with Arthur Apple serving as vice–president and business manager.

The Warsaw Red Sox hosted their home opener on Tuesday, April 19, 1947, in a night game against the Clinton Blues at 7:45 P.M. at Warsaw Park. It was noted in newspaper reports that the Goldsboro High School Band was to "present music for the occasion." Prior to the beginning the season, Warsaw played home exhibition games against the Wilmington Pirates and the Wallace All–Stars. It was noted the final Wilmington exhibition game was designated as "ladies day" for the Sunday game, with ladies admitted free.

In their first season of play, the 1947 Warsaw Red Sox ended the season in fifth place. Playing in the eight–team league, Warsaw ended the regular season with a 59–64 record under manager James Milner. Warsaw finished 12.5 games behind of the first place Sanford Spinners. The Red Sox did not qualify for the four team playoffs, won by the Sanford Spinners. Pitcher Carl Johnson of Warsaw led the Tobacco State League with 225 strikeouts.

In 1948, the Warsaw Red Sox continued play as members of the Class D level Tobacco State League. The Reds ended the regular season in fifth place with a 71–67 record, playing under managers Sam Gibson and Verne Blackwell. Warsaw finished 8.5 games behind the first placed Sanford Spinners in the final standings. The Red Sox did not qualify for the playoffs, won by the Reeds Springs Robins.

The Warsaw Red Sox folded following the 1948 season and were replaced by the Fayetteville Scotties franchise in 1949 Tobacco State League play.

Warsaw, North Carolina has not hosted another minor league team.

== The ballpark ==
The Warsaw Red Sox minor league teams were noted to have hosted home games at Warsaw Park. The park is called Taylor Field today, with recreational baseball and softball facilities. Taylor Field is located on George Street, Warsaw, North Carolina.

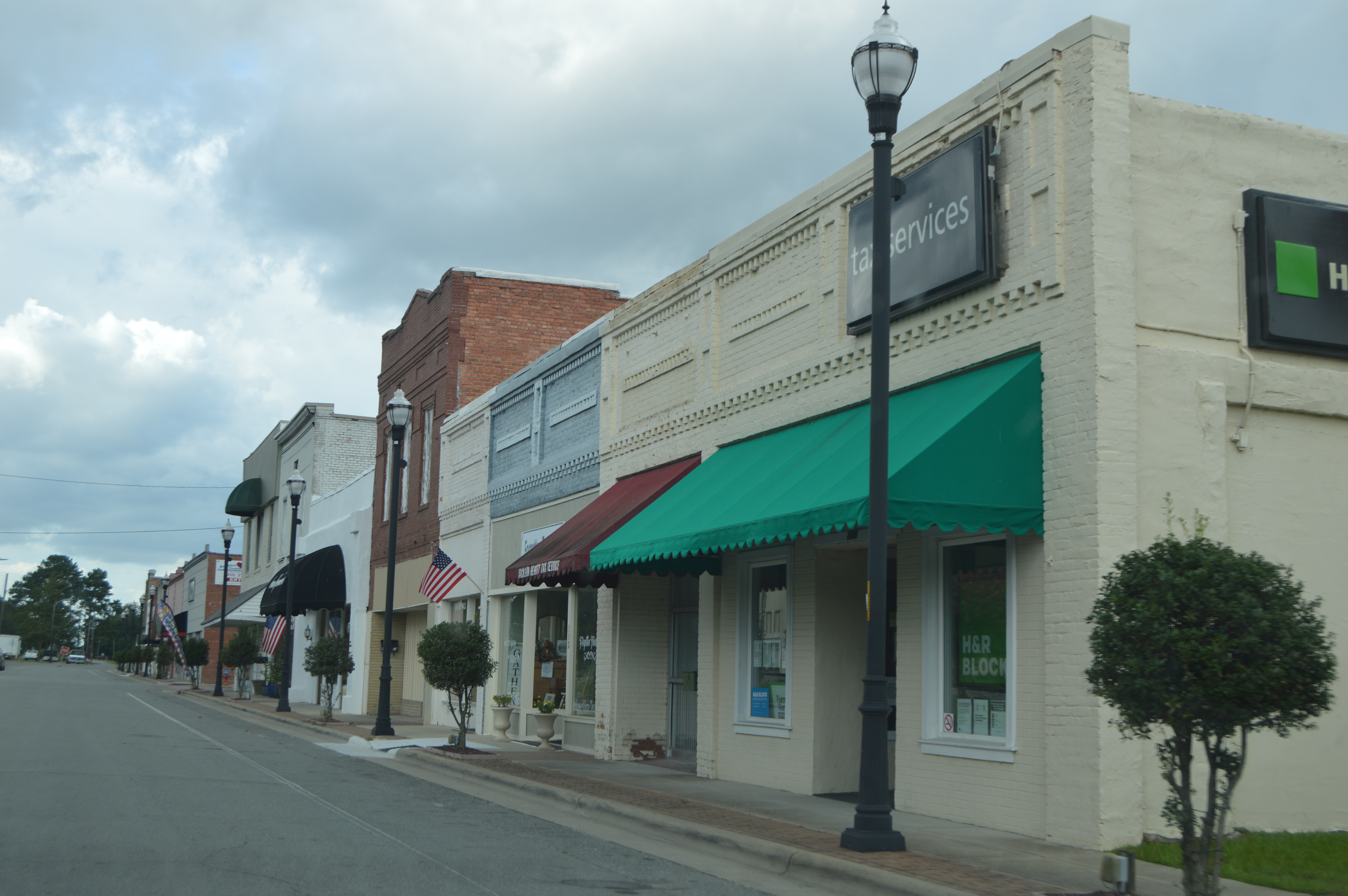
(2020) Front Street. National Register of Historic Places. Warsaw, North Carolina

== Timeline ==
Year(s)	# Yrs.	Team	Level	League	Affiliate	Ballpark
1947–1948	2	Warsaw Red Sox	Class D	Tobacco State League	None	Warsaw Park (Taylor Field)

== Year–by–year records ==
Year	Record	Finish	Manager	Attend	Playoffs/Notes
1947	59–64	5th	James Milner	36,865	Did not qualify
1948	71–67	5th	Sam Gibson / Verne Blackwell	32,482	Did not qualify

== Notable alumni ==
- Sam Gibson (1948, MGR)
- Leo Katkaveck (1948)

=== See also ===
Warsaw Red Sox players
