= List of Chicago Cubs minor league affiliates =

Current Chicago Cubs domestic minor league affiliate locations

The Chicago Cubs farm system consists of seven Minor League Baseball affiliates across the United States and in the Dominican Republic. Four teams are independently owned, while three—the Arizona Complex League Cubs and two Dominican Summer League Cubs squads—are owned by the major league club.

The Cubs have been affiliated with the Triple-A Iowa Cubs of the International League since 1981, making it the longest-running affiliation in the organization among teams not owned by the Cubs. Their newest affiliates are the High-A South Bend Cubs of the Midwest League and the Single-A Myrtle Beach Pelicans of the Carolina League, which became Cubs affiliates in 2015.

Geographically, Chicago's closest domestic affiliate is the South Bend Cubs, which are approximately 75 miles (121 km) away. Chicago's furthest domestic affiliate is the Rookie Arizona Complex League Cubs, which are some 1,437 miles (2,313 km) away.

== Current affiliates ==
The Chicago Cubs farm system consists of seven minor league affiliates.

Class	Team	League	Location	Ballpark	Affiliated
Triple-A	Iowa Cubs	International League	Des Moines, Iowa	Principal Park	1981
Double-A	Knoxville Smokies	Southern League	Knoxville, Tennessee	Covenant Health Park	2007
High-A	South Bend Cubs	Midwest League	South Bend, Indiana	Four Winds Field at Coveleski Stadium	2015
Single-A	Myrtle Beach Pelicans	Carolina League	Myrtle Beach, South Carolina	Pelicans Ballpark	2015
Rookie	ACL Cubs	Arizona Complex League	Mesa, Arizona	Sloan Park	2021
Rookie	DSL Cubs Blue	Dominican Summer League	Boca Chica, Santo Domingo	Baseball City Complex	2016
Rookie	DSL Cubs Red	Dominican Summer League	Boca Chica, Santo Domingo	Baseball City Complex	2016

== Past affiliates ==
=== Key ===
Season	Each year is linked to an article about that particular Cubs season.

=== 1922–1962 ===
Minor League Baseball operated with five classes (Double-A, Class A, Class B, Class C, and Class D) from 1922 to 1935. Class A1, between Double-A and Class A, was added in 1936. The minors continued to operate with these six levels through 1945. Triple-A was established as the highest classification in 1946, and Class A1 became Double-A, with Class A through D remaining. These six levels continued through 1962. The Pacific Coast League (PCL) was reclassified from Triple-A to Open in 1952 due to the possibility of becoming a third major league. This arrangement ended following the 1957 season when the relocation of the National League's Dodgers and Giants to the West Coast ended any chance of the PCL being promoted.

Season	Triple-A	Double-A	Class A	Class B	Class C	Class D	Ref.
1922	—	—	Wichita Falls Spudders	—	—	—	
1923	—	—	Wichita Falls Spudders	—	—	—	
1924	—	—	Wichita Falls Spudders	—	—	—	
1925	—	—	Wichita Falls Spudders	—	—	—	
1926	—	—	—	—	—	—	
1927	—	Reading Keystones	—	—	—	—	
1928	—	Reading Keystones	—	—	—	—	
1929	—	Reading Keystones	—	—	—	—	
1930	—	Reading Keystones	—	—	—	—	
1931	—	—	—	—	—	—	
1932	—	Los Angeles Angels	Wichita Aviators	—	—	—	
1933	—	Los Angeles Angels	—	—	—	—	
1934	—	Los Angeles Angels	—	—	Ponca City Angels	—	
1935	—	Los Angeles Angels	—	Peoria Tractors; Portsmouth Truckers	Ponca City Angels	—	
1936	—	Los Angeles Angels	Birmingham Barons (A1)	Portsmouth Cubs	Ponca City Angels	—	
1937	—	Los Angeles Angels	Birmingham Barons (A1)	Moline Plow Boys; Portsmouth Cubs	Ponca City Angels	Eau Claire Bears	
1938	—	Los Angeles Angels	Birmingham Barons (A1)	Moline Plow Boys; Portsmouth Cubs	Helena Seaporters; Ponca City Angels	Eau Claire Bears; Greeneville Burley Cubs	
1939	—	Los Angeles Angels; Milwaukee Brewers	—	Bloomington Bloomers; Moline Plow Boys	St. Joseph Angels	Bisbee-Douglas Bees; Eau Claire Bears; Hopkinsville Hoppers; Sioux Falls Canaries	
1940	—	Los Angeles Angels; Milwaukee Brewers	Tulsa Oilers (A1)	Moline Plow Boys	St. Joseph Saints	Greeneville Burley Cubs	
1941	—	Los Angeles Angels; Milwaukee Brewers	Tulsa Oilers (A1)	Macon Peaches; Portsmouth Cubs	Bisbee Bees; Muskogee Reds; Stockton Fliers; Zanesville Cubs	Janesville Cubs; Lake Charles Skippers	
1942	—	Los Angeles Angels; Milwaukee Brewers	Tulsa Oilers (A1)	Macon Peaches; Madison Blues; Portsmouth Cubs; Vancouver Capilanos	Ashland Colonels; Zanesville Cubs	Americus Pioneers; Janesville Cubs	
1943	—	Los Angeles Angels	Nashville Volunteers (A1)	Portsmouth Cubs	Lockport Cubs	Erwin Aces	
1944	—	Los Angeles Angels	Nashville Volunteers (A1)	Portsmouth Cubs	—	Erwin Aces; Lockport Cubs; Marion Diggers	
1945	—	Los Angeles Angels	Nashville Volunteers (A1)	Hagerstown Owls; Portsmouth Cubs	Leaksville-Draper-Spray Triplets	Elizabethton Betsy Cubs; Statesville Cubs	
1946	Los Angeles Angels	Nashville Volunteers; Tulsa Oilers	Macon Peaches	Davenport Cubs; Hagerstown Owls; Portsmouth Cubs; Shelby Cubs; Tacoma Tigers	Hutchinson Cubs; Quebec Alouettes; Visalia Cubs	Elizabethton Betsy Cubs; Fayetteville Cubs; Hopkinsville Hoppers; Iola Cubs; Janesville Bears; Statesville Cubs	
1947	Los Angeles Angels	Nashville Volunteers; Tulsa Oilers	Des Moines Bruins; Macon Peaches	Davenport Cubs; Fayetteville Cubs; Portsmouth Cubs; Tacoma Tigers	Clinton Cubs; Hutchinson Cubs; Sioux Falls Canaries; Visalia Cubs	Centralia Cubs; Elizabethton Betsy Cubs; Iola Cubs; Janesville Cubs; Lumberton Cubs; Marion Cubs	
1948	Los Angeles Angels	Nashville Volunteers	Des Moines Bruins; Macon Peaches	Decatur Commodores; Fayetteville Cubs; Selma Cloverleafs; Springfield Cubs	Clinton Cubs; Hutchinson Cubs / Springfield Cubs; Sioux Falls Canaries; Visalia Cubs	Centralia Cubs; Elizabethton Betsy Cubs; Janesville Cubs; Lumberton Cubs; Marion Cubs; St. Augustine Saints	
1949	Los Angeles Angels	Nashville Volunteers	Des Moines Bruins; Macon Peaches	Decatur Cubs; Selma Cloverleafs; Springfield Cubs	Clinton Steers; Sioux Falls Canaries; Visalia Cubs	Carthage Cubs; Janesville Cubs; Lumberton Auctioneers; Rutherford County Owls; St. Augustine Saints	
1950	Los Angeles Angels; Springfield Cubs	Nashville Volunteers	Des Moines Bruins; Grand Rapids Jets	Rock Hill Chiefs	Clovis Pioneers; Sioux Falls Canaries; Springfield Cubs; Visalia Cubs	Carthage Cubs; Janesville Cubs; Moultrie Cubs; Rutherford County Owls	
1951	Los Angeles Angels; Springfield Cubs	Nashville Volunteers	Des Moines Bruins; Grand Rapids Jets	Greensboro Patriots; Rock Hill Chiefs	Clovis Pioneers; Sioux Falls Canaries; Topeka Owls; Visalia Cubs	Carthage Cubs; Janesville Cubs; Rutherford County Owls	
1952	Los Angeles Angels (Open); Springfield Cubs	—	Des Moines Bruins; Macon Peaches	Greensboro Patriots	Sioux Falls Canaries; Topeka Owls; Visalia Cubs	Blackwell Broncos; Hickory Rebels; Janesville Cubs	
1953	Los Angeles Angels (Open); Springfield Cubs	—	Des Moines Bruins; Macon Peaches	Cedar Rapids Indians	Sioux Falls Canaries; Stockton Ports	Gainesville Owls; Hickory Rebels; Janesville Cubs	
1954	Los Angeles Angels (Open)	Beaumont Exporters	Des Moines Bruins; Macon Peaches	Cedar Rapids Indians	Blackwell Broncos; Magic Valley Cowboys; Stockton Ports	Gainesville Owls; Hickory Rebels	
1955	Los Angeles Angels (Open)	—	Des Moines Bruins; Macon Peaches	Burlington Bees	Lafayette Oilers; Magic Valley Cowboys; Vicksburg Hill Billies	Gainesville Owls / Ponca City Cubs; Paris Lakers	
1956	Los Angeles Angels (Open)	Tulsa Oilers	Des Moines Bruins	Burlington Bees	Lafayette Oilers; Magic Valley Cowboys	Crestview Braves; Paris Lakers; Ponca City Cubs	
1957	Portland Beavers (Open)	Fort Worth Cats; Memphis Chickasaws	Des Moines Bruins	Burlington Bees	Bakersfield Bears; Lafayette Oilers; Magic Valley Cowboys	Paris Lakers; Ponca City Cubs; Pulaski Cubs	
1958	Portland Beavers	Fort Worth Cats	Pueblo Bruins	Burlington Bees	Magic Valley Cowboys	Carlsbad Potashers; Paris Lakers; Pulaski Cubs	
1959	Fort Worth Cats	San Antonio Missions	Lancaster Red Roses	Burlington Bees	—	Carlsbad Potashers; Morristown Cubs; Paris Lakers	
1960	Houston Buffs	San Antonio Missions	Lancaster Red Roses	—	St. Cloud Rox	Carlsbad Potashers; Morristown Cubs	
1961	Houston Buffs	San Antonio Missions	—	Wenatchee Chiefs	St. Cloud Rox	Carlsbad Potashers; Morristown Cubs	
1962	Salt Lake City Bees (Note: In 1962, the Cubs shared the Triple-A Salt Lake City Bees with the Cleveland Indians.)	San Antonio Missions	—	Wenatchee Chiefs	St. Cloud Rox	Palatka Cubs	

=== 1963–1989 ===
Prior to the 1963 season, Major League Baseball (MLB) initiated a reorganization of Minor League Baseball that resulted in a reduction from six classes to four (Triple-A, Double-A, Class A, and Rookie) in response to the general decline of the minors throughout the 1950s and early-1960s when leagues and teams folded due to shrinking attendance caused by baseball fans' preference for staying at home to watch MLB games on television. The only change made within the next 27 years was Class A being subdivided for the first time to form Class A Short Season in 1966.

Season	Triple-A	Double-A	Class A	Class A Short Season	Rookie	Ref.
1963	Salt Lake City Bees	Amarillo Gold Sox	Pocatello Chiefs; St. Cloud Rox; Wenatchee Chiefs	—	—	
1964	Salt Lake City Bees	Fort Worth Cats	St. Cloud Rox; Wenatchee Chiefs	—	Treasure Valley Cubs	
1965	Salt Lake City Bees	Dallas-Fort Worth Spurs	Duluth-Superior Dukes; Quincy Cubs; Wenatchee Chiefs	—	Treasure Valley Cubs	
1966	Tacoma Cubs	Dallas-Fort Worth Spurs	Lodi Crushers; Quincy Cubs	Duluth-Superior Dukes	Treasure Valley Cubs	
1967	Tacoma Cubs	Dallas-Fort Worth Spurs	Lodi Crushers; Quincy Cubs	—	Caldwell Cubs	
1968	Tacoma Cubs	San Antonio Missions	Lodi Crushers; Quincy Cubs	—	Caldwell Cubs	
1969	Tacoma Cubs	San Antonio Missions	Quincy Cubs	Huron Cubs	Caldwell Cubs	
1970	Tacoma Cubs	San Antonio Missions	Quincy Cubs	Huron Cubs	Caldwell Cubs	
1971	Tacoma Cubs	San Antonio Missions	Quincy Cubs	—	Caldwell Cubs	
1972	Wichita Aeros	Midland Cubs	Quincy Cubs	—	GCL Cubs	
1973	Wichita Aeros	Midland Cubs	Quincy Cubs	—	GCL Cubs	
1974	Wichita Aeros	Midland Cubs	Key West Conchs	—	GCL Cubs	
1975	Wichita Aeros	Midland Cubs	Key West Cubs	—	GCL Cubs	
1976	Wichita Aeros	Midland Cubs	Pompano Beach Cubs	—	GCL Cubs	
1977	Wichita Aeros	Midland Cubs	Pompano Beach Cubs	Geneva Cubs	GCL Cubs	
1978	Wichita Aeros	Midland Cubs	Pompano Beach Cubs	Geneva Cubs	GCL Cubs	
1979	Wichita Aeros	Midland Cubs	Quad Cities Cubs	Geneva Cubs	GCL Cubs	
1980	Wichita Aeros	Midland Cubs	Quad Cities Cubs	Geneva Cubs	GCL Cubs	
1981	Iowa Oaks	Midland Cubs	Quad Cities Cubs	Geneva Cubs	GCL Cubs	
1982	Iowa Cubs	Midland Cubs	Quad Cities Cubs; Salinas Spurs	Geneva Cubs	GCL Cubs	
1983	Iowa Cubs	Midland Cubs	Quad Cities Cubs; Salinas Spurs	Geneva Cubs	Pikeville Cubs	
1984	Iowa Cubs	Midland Cubs	Lodi Crushers; Quad Cities Cubs	Geneva Cubs	Pikeville Cubs	
1985	Iowa Cubs	Pittsfield Cubs	Peoria Chiefs; Winston-Salem Spirits	Geneva Cubs	Wytheville Cubs	
1986	Iowa Cubs	Pittsfield Cubs	Peoria Chiefs; Winston-Salem Spirits	Geneva Cubs	Wytheville Cubs	
1987	Iowa Cubs	Pittsfield Cubs	Peoria Chiefs; Winston-Salem Spirits	Geneva Cubs	Wytheville Cubs	
1988	Iowa Cubs	Pittsfield Cubs	Charleston Wheelers; Peoria Chiefs; Winston-Salem Spirits	Geneva Cubs	Wytheville Cubs	
1989	Iowa Cubs	Charlotte Knights	Charleston Wheelers; Peoria Chiefs; Winston-Salem Spirits	Geneva Cubs	Wytheville Cubs	

=== 1990–2020 ===
Minor League Baseball operated with six classes from 1990 to 2020. In 1990, the Class A level was subdivided for a second time with the creation of Class A-Advanced. The Rookie level consisted of domestic and foreign circuits.

Season	Triple-A	Double-A	Class A-Advanced	Class A	Class A Short Season	Rookie	Foreign Rookie	Ref(s).
1990	Iowa Cubs	Charlotte Knights	Winston-Salem Spirits	Peoria Chiefs	Geneva Cubs	Huntington Cubs	—	
1991	Iowa Cubs	Charlotte Knights	Winston-Salem Spirits	Peoria Chiefs	Geneva Cubs	Huntington Cubs	DSL Cubs/Royals	
1992	Iowa Cubs	Charlotte Knights	Winston-Salem Spirits	Peoria Chiefs	Geneva Cubs	Huntington Cubs; AZL Cubs/Rockies	DSL Cubs/Rockies/Royals	
1993	Iowa Cubs	Orlando Cubs	Daytona Cubs	Peoria Chiefs	Geneva Cubs	Huntington Cubs; GCL Cubs	DSL Cubs/Rangers	
1994	Iowa Cubs	Orlando Cubs	Daytona Cubs	Peoria Chiefs	Williamsport Cubs	Huntington Cubs; GCL Cubs	DSL Cubs/Padres	
1995	Iowa Cubs	Orlando Cubs	Daytona Cubs	Rockford Cubbies	Williamsport Cubs	GCL Cubs	DSL Cubs/Padres	
1996	Iowa Cubs	Orlando Cubs	Daytona Cubs	Rockford Cubbies	Williamsport Cubs	GCL Cubs	DSL Cubs/Padres	
1997	Iowa Cubs	Orlando Rays	Daytona Cubs	Rockford Cubbies	Williamsport Cubs	AZL Cubs	DSL Cubs	
1998	Iowa Cubs	West Tenn Diamond Jaxx	Daytona Cubs	Rockford Cubbies	Williamsport Cubs	AZL Cubs	DSL Cubs	
1999	Iowa Cubs	West Tenn Diamond Jaxx	Daytona Cubs	Lansing Lugnuts	Eugene Emeralds	AZL Cubs	DSL Cubs	
2000	Iowa Cubs	West Tenn Diamond Jaxx	Daytona Cubs	Lansing Lugnuts	Eugene Emeralds	AZL Cubs	DSL Cubs	
2001	Iowa Cubs	West Tenn Diamond Jaxx	Daytona Cubs	Lansing Lugnuts	Boise Hawks	AZL Cubs	DSL Cubs	
2002	Iowa Cubs	West Tenn Diamond Jaxx	Daytona Cubs	Lansing Lugnuts	Boise Hawks	AZL Cubs	DSL Cubs; VSL Puerto Cabello (Note: In 2002, the Cubs operated a Venezuelan Summer League team as a co-op with the Colorado Rockies.)	
2003	Iowa Cubs	West Tenn Diamond Jaxx	Daytona Cubs	Lansing Lugnuts	Boise Hawks	AZL Cubs	DSL Cubs	
2004	Iowa Cubs	West Tenn Diamond Jaxx	Daytona Cubs	Lansing Lugnuts	Boise Hawks	AZL Cubs	DSL Cubs	
2005	Iowa Cubs	West Tenn Diamond Jaxx	Daytona Cubs	Peoria Chiefs	Boise Hawks	AZL Cubs	DSL Cubs	
2006	Iowa Cubs	West Tenn Diamond Jaxx	Daytona Cubs	Peoria Chiefs	Boise Hawks	AZL Cubs	DSL Cubs	
2007	Iowa Cubs	Tennessee Smokies	Daytona Cubs	Peoria Chiefs	Boise Hawks	AZL Cubs	DSL Cubs; VSL Cubs/Twins	
2008	Iowa Cubs	Tennessee Smokies	Daytona Cubs	Peoria Chiefs	Boise Hawks	AZL Cubs	DSL Cubs 1 DSL Cubs 2	
2009	Iowa Cubs	Tennessee Smokies	Daytona Cubs	Peoria Chiefs	Boise Hawks	AZL Cubs	DSL Cubs 1 DSL Cubs 2	
2010	Iowa Cubs	Tennessee Smokies	Daytona Cubs	Peoria Chiefs	Boise Hawks	AZL Cubs	DSL Cubs 1 DSL Cubs 2	
2011	Iowa Cubs	Tennessee Smokies	Daytona Cubs	Peoria Chiefs	Boise Hawks	AZL Cubs	DSL Cubs 1 DSL Cubs 2	
2012	Iowa Cubs	Tennessee Smokies	Daytona Cubs	Peoria Chiefs	Boise Hawks	AZL Cubs	DSL Cubs 1 DSL Cubs 2	
2013	Iowa Cubs	Tennessee Smokies	Daytona Cubs	Kane County Cougars	Boise Hawks	AZL Cubs	DSL Cubs; VSL Cubs	
2014	Iowa Cubs	Tennessee Smokies	Daytona Cubs	Kane County Cougars	Boise Hawks	AZL Cubs	DSL Cubs; VSL Cubs	
2015	Iowa Cubs	Tennessee Smokies	Myrtle Beach Pelicans	South Bend Cubs	Eugene Emeralds	AZL Cubs	DSL Cubs; VSL Cubs	
2016	Iowa Cubs	Tennessee Smokies	Myrtle Beach Pelicans	South Bend Cubs	Eugene Emeralds	AZL Cubs	DSL Cubs 1 DSL Cubs 2	
2017	Iowa Cubs	Tennessee Smokies	Myrtle Beach Pelicans	South Bend Cubs	Eugene Emeralds	AZL Cubs	DSL Cubs 1 DSL Cubs 2	
2018	Iowa Cubs	Tennessee Smokies	Myrtle Beach Pelicans	South Bend Cubs	Eugene Emeralds	AZL Cubs 1 AZL Cubs 2	DSL Cubs 1 DSL Cubs 2	
2019	Iowa Cubs	Tennessee Smokies	Myrtle Beach Pelicans	South Bend Cubs	Eugene Emeralds	AZL Cubs 1 AZL Cubs 2	DSL Cubs 1 DSL Cubs 2	
2020 (Note: The 2020 Minor League Baseball season was cancelled due to the COVID-19 pandemic.)	Iowa Cubs	Tennessee Smokies	Myrtle Beach Pelicans	South Bend Cubs	Eugene Emeralds	AZL Cubs Blue; AZL Cubs Red	DSL Cubs Blue; DSL Cubs Red	

=== 2021–present ===
The current structure of Minor League Baseball is the result of an overall contraction of the system beginning with the 2021 season. Class A was reduced to two levels: High-A and Low-A. Low-A was reclassified as Single-A in 2022.

Season	Triple-A	Double-A	High-A	Single-A	Rookie	Foreign Rookie	Ref.
2021	Iowa Cubs	Tennessee Smokies	South Bend Cubs	Myrtle Beach Pelicans	ACL Cubs	DSL Cubs Blue; DSL Cubs Red	
2022	Iowa Cubs	Tennessee Smokies	South Bend Cubs	Myrtle Beach Pelicans	ACL Cubs	DSL Cubs Blue; DSL Cubs Red	
2023	Iowa Cubs	Tennessee Smokies	South Bend Cubs	Myrtle Beach Pelicans	ACL Cubs	DSL Cubs Blue; DSL Cubs Red	
2024	Iowa Cubs	Tennessee Smokies	South Bend Cubs	Myrtle Beach Pelicans	ACL Cubs	DSL Cubs Blue; DSL Cubs Red	
2025	Iowa Cubs	Knoxville Smokies	South Bend Cubs	Myrtle Beach Pelicans	ACL Cubs	DSL Cubs Blue; DSL Cubs Red	
2026	Iowa Cubs	Knoxville Smokies	South Bend Cubs	Myrtle Beach Pelicans	ACL Cubs	DSL Cubs Blue; DSL Cubs Red	
