= Rockingham Eagles =

- 1950; Rockingham, North Carolina

Minor league affiliations
- Class: Class D (1950)
- League: Tobacco State League (1950)

Major league affiliations
- Team: None

Minor league titles
- League titles (1): 1950
- Wild card berths (1): 1950

Team data
- Name: Rockingham Eagles (1950)
- Ballpark: Rockingham Baseball Park (1950)

The Rockingham Eagles were a minor league baseball team based in Rockingham, North Carolina who won the league championship in their only season of play. In 1950, the Eagles played as members of the Class D level Tobacco State League, winning the league championship in the last season of play for the league. The Rockingham Baseball Park served as home to the Eagles.

== History ==
Rockingham, North Carolina first hosted minor league play in 1950, whet the Rockingham "Eagles" became members of the eight–team Class D level Tobacco State League during the last season of the league.

The Clinton Sampson Blues, Dunn-Erwin Twins, Lumberton Auctioneers, Red Springs Red Robins, Sanford Spinners, Smithfield–Selma Leafs and Wilmington Pirates joined Rockingham in beginning Tobacco State League play on April 28, 1950.

In their only season of play, the 1950 Rockingham Eagles won the final Tobacco State League championship. Rockingham finished the regular season with a record of 63–64, to place fourth in the Tobacco State League standings. Playing under managers Jack Bell and Turkey Tyson, Rockingham finished 27.5 games behind the first place Lumberton Auctioneers. The Eagles then swept through the four-team playoffs to win the championship. In the first round of the playoffs, the Rockingham Eagles defeated the Lumberton Auctioneers four games to two to advance. In the Finals, the Rockingham Eagles defeated the Sanford Spinners four games to three to claim the championship.

The Tobacco State League permanently folded following the 1950 season. Rockingham, North Carolina has not hosted another minor league team.

== The ballpark ==
The 1950 Rockingham Eagles minor league team was noted to have played home games at the Rockingham Baseball Park. The ballpark reportedly was later called Rockingham Stadium and had hosted traveling Negro league baseball games.

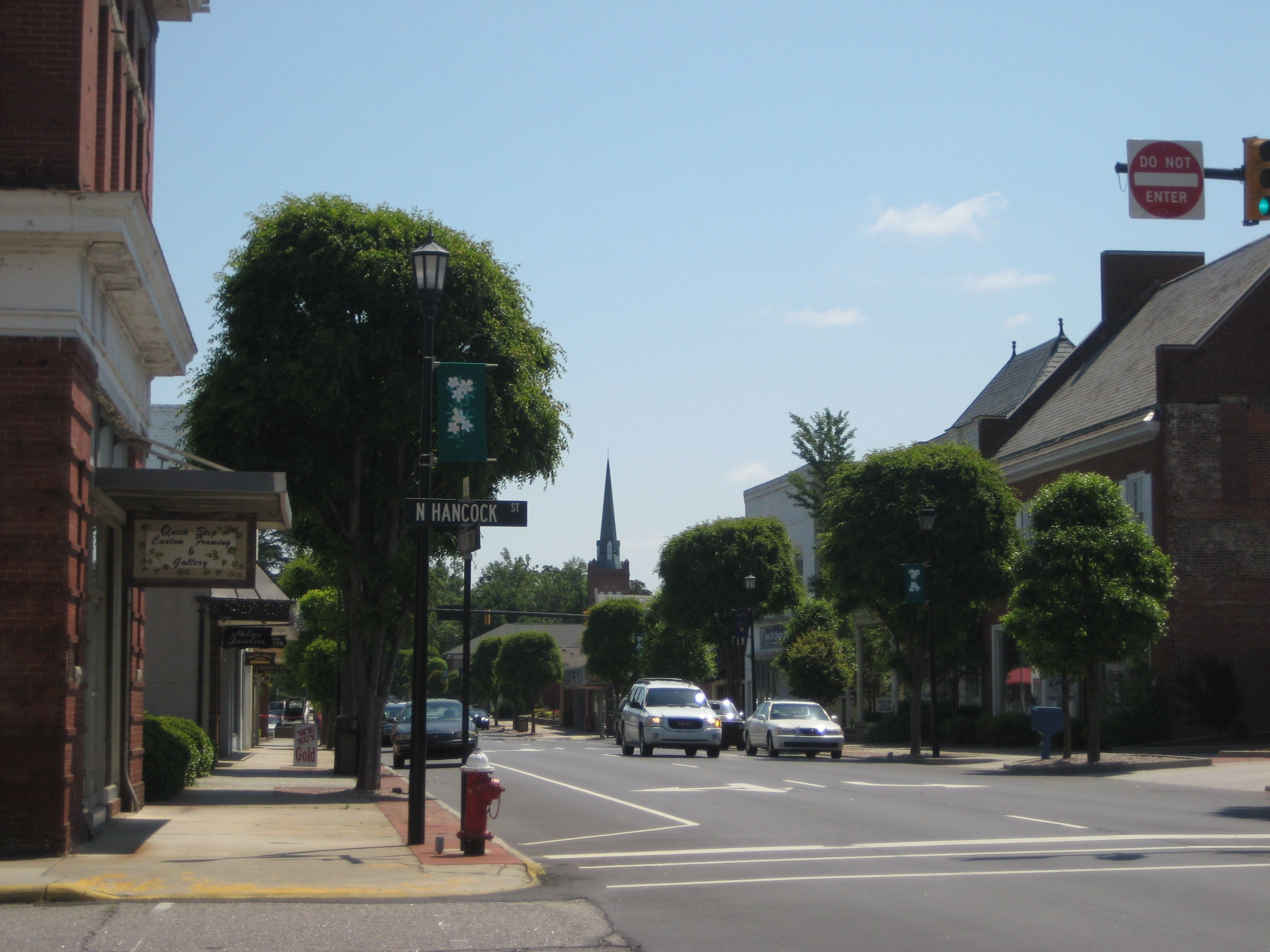
(2019) Downtown Area. Rockingham, North Carolina

== Year–by–year record ==
| Year | Record | Finish | Manager | Playoffs/Notes |
|---|---|---|---|---|
| 1950 | 63–69 | 4th | Jack Bell / Turkey Tyson | League champions |

== Notable alumni ==
Turkey Tyson (1950, MGR)
