= Angier-Fuquay Springs Bulls =

Angier–Fuquay Springs Bulls
- 1946; Angier, North Carolina

Minor league affiliations
- Class: Class D (1946)
- League: Tobacco State League (1946)

Major league affiliations
- Team: None

Minor league titles
- League titles (1): 1946
- Wild card berths (1): 1946

Team data
- Name: Angier–Fuquay Springs Bulls (1946)
- Ballpark: Angier Baseball Park (1946)

The Angier–Fuquay Springs Bulls were a minor league baseball team based in Angier, North Carolina, in partnership with the Fuquay Mineral Spring area. In 1946, the Bulls played as members of the Class D level Tobacco State League, winning the league championship in their only season of minor league play. The Bulls hosted home minor league games at the Angier Baseball Park.

== History ==
Angier, North Carolina first hosted minor league play in 1946, when the "Angier–Fuquay Springs Bulls" became charter members of the six–team Class D level Tobacco State League. The Clinton Blues, Dunn–Erwin Twins, Sanford Spinners, Smithfield–Selma Leafs and Wilmington Pirates teams joined Angier–Fuquay Springs as charter members in Tobacco State League play.

In their first and only season of minor league play, the 1946 Angier–Fuquay Springs Bulls won the Tobacco State League championship. The Bulls finished the 1946 Tobacco State League regular season with a 57–62 record to place fourth, finishing 14.0 games behind the first place Sanford Spinners. Playing under managers Paul Dunlap and Gaither Riley, the Bulls qualified for the four–team playoffs. In the first round of the playoffs, the Angier-Fuquay Springs Bulls defeated the Sanford Spinners 4 games to 2 to advance. In the Finals, Angier-Fuquay Springs won the Tobacco State League championship in defeating the Clinton Blues 4 games 3.

Despite winning the 1946 championship, the Angier–Fuquay Springs Bulls did not return to 1947 Tobacco State League play. The league expanded to become an eight–team league, adding the Red Springs Red Robins, Lumberton Cubs and Warsaw Reds franchises in 1947 league play.

Angier, North Carolina has not hosted another minor league team.

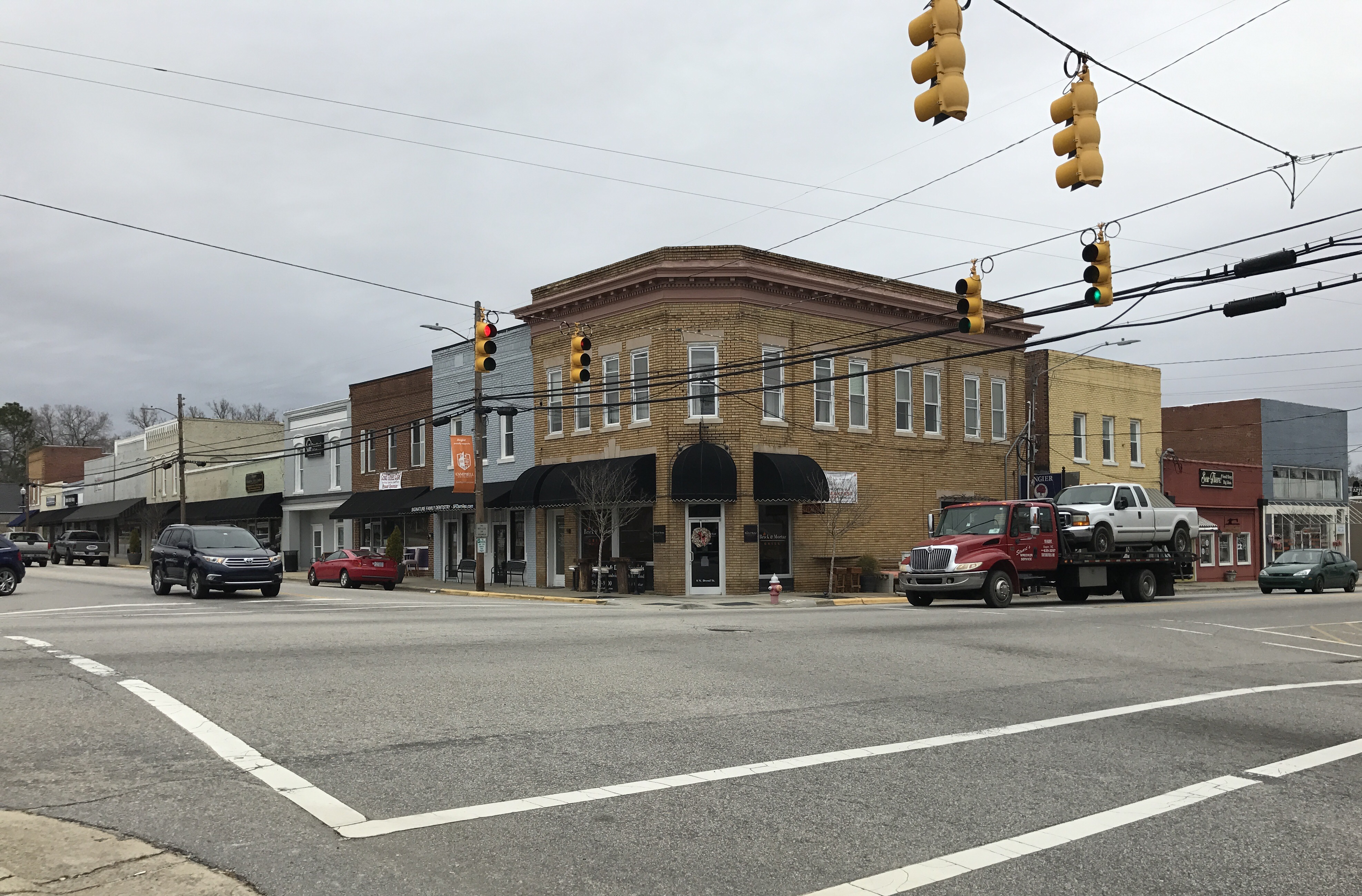
(2019) Angier, North Carolina

== The ballpark ==
The Angier, North Carolina–based Angier–Fuquay Springs Bulls minor league teams hosted 1946 home minor league games at the Angier Baseball Park. Reportedly, the ballpark had a capacity of 1,500.

== Year-by-year records ==
Year	Record	Finish	Manager	Playoffs/Notes
1946	57–62	4th	Paul Dunlap / Gaither Riley	League champions

== Notable alumni ==
- Dave Odom (1947)
