= Lumberton Cubs =

- 1947–1950; Lumberton, North Carolina

Minor league affiliations
- Class: Class D (1947–1950)
- League: Tobacco State League (1947–1950)

Major league affiliations
- Team: Chicago Cubs (1947–1949)

Minor league titles
- League titles (0): None
- Conference titles (1): 1950
- Wild card berths (2): 1947; 1949

Team data
- Name: Lumberton Cubs (1947–1948); Lumberton Auctioneers (1949–1950)
- Ballpark: Lumberton Armory Field (1946–1950)

The Lumberton Cubs were a minor league baseball team based in Lumberton, North Carolina. From 1947 to 1950, Lumberton teams played exclusively as members of the Class D level Tobacco State League, winning the league pennant in 1950. The franchise played as the Lumberton Auctioneers in 1949 and 1950. Lumberton hosted home games at Lumberton Armory Field.

The Lumberton Cubs were a minor league affiliate of the Chicago Cubs from 1947 to 1949.

== History ==
Lumberton, North Carolina, first hosted minor league play in 1947. The Lumberton "Cubs" began play as members of the eight–team Class D level Tobacco State League as a minor league affiliate of the Chicago Cubs. The Clinton Blues, Dunn-Erwin Twins, Red Springs Red Robins, Sanford Spinners, Smithfield-Selma Leafs, Warsaw Red Sox and Wilmington Pirates teams joined Lumberton in league play.

The Lumberton minor league franchise was formed in 1947. Reportedly a group of 10 local businessmen, including Tim Murcheson, led an effort to the apply to the Tobacco State League for membership. The league accepted the application and expanded from six to eight teams, adding Lumberton and Red Springs teams as new members for the 1947 season. Jack Sheahan was president of the franchise in 1947; Harold K. George, vice president and Elton Frazier, business manager.

The home opener at Lumberton was on April 24, 1947. It was noted the Fairmont and Lumberton High School bands performed, as Reverend R.L. Alexander served as master of ceremonies. Lumberton Mayor “Rom” A. Hedgpeth addressed the 3,000 fans in attendance before the games. Mrs. M.F. Townsend and Henry McDuffie sing the national anthem. Lumberton lost to Red Springs by the score of 14–3 in the opening game.

In their first season of play, the 1947 Lumberton Cubs ended the season in second place. Playing in the eight–team league, Lumberton ended the regular season with a 71–49 record under manager Red Lucas. Lumberton finished 12.5 games behind of the first place Sanford Spinners. In the playoffs, Lumberton first defeated the Dunn-Erwin Twins 4 games to 1 to advance. The Cubs lost to Sanford 4 games to 3 in the final series.

In 1948, the Lumberton Cubs continued play as members of the Class D level Tobacco State League. The Cubs ended the regular season in seventh place with an 55–81 record, playing under manager Charles Jamin. Lumberton finished 25.0 games behind the first placed Sanford Spinners in the final standings. Lumberton did not qualify for the playoffs, won by the Reeds Springs Robins.

Continuing play in the 1949 Tobacco State League, the newly named Lumberton Auctioneers placed third in the eight–team league in their final season as a Chicago Cubs affiliate. The Auctioneers finished the regular season with a record of 75–61, playing under managers Red Lucas and Jim Guinn. Lumberton finished 6.5 games behind the first place Dunn-Erwin Twins in the regular season standings. Lumberton lost in the first round playoff series against the Dunn-Erwin Twins 4 games to 1.

In 1949, it was reported the team held a contest to pick a new name for the team. Reverend R.L. Alexander led six other judges in picking the winner, and the Lumberton "Auctioneers" was chosen. The club was generally referred to as the Auks. It was noted Murphy Bowman was the Lumberton franchise president. R.A. Hedgpeth was the vice-president and Buddy Frazier continued as business manager.

In their final season, the 1950 Lumberton Auctioneers won the Tobacco State League pennant. On July 12, 1950, John Gerace of Lumberton threw a no-hitter in a 5–0 victory over the Red Springs Red Robins. With a 93–41 regular season record, the Auctioneers placed first in the regular season standings, finishing 1.5 games ahead of the second place Sanford Spinners. Led by manager John Streza, Lumberton proceeded to the playoffs, losing to the Rockingham Eagles 4 games to 2. Lumberton reportedly lost the first two playoff games at home and won two games on the road. The Auctioneers played their last game with a 17–inning 7–6 loss. The Tobacco State League permanently folded following the 1950 season.

Lumberton, North Carolina has not hosted another minor league team.

== The ballpark ==
The Lumberton minor league teams were noted to have played home games at the Lumberton Armory Field. The ballpark reportedly underwent improvements to begin hosting minor league games in 1947, including new sod on the infield, improved restrooms and updated grandstands. In 1948, it was reported a roof was built over the grandstands and a visiting locker room was constructed. 1947 admission was 65 cents for adults, 35 cents for high school students and 25 cents for children younger than 12. The site today contains the Bill Sapp Recreation Center. The location is 1100 North Cedar Street, Lumberton, North Carolina.

== Timeline ==
Year(s)	# Yrs.	Team	Level	League	Affiliate	Ballpark
1947–1948	2	Lumberton Cubs	Class D	Tobacco State League	Chicago Cubs	Armory Field
1949	1	Lumberton Auctioneers	Class D	Tobacco State League	Chicago Cubs	Armory Field
1950	1	Lumberton Auctioneers	Class D	Tobacco State League	None	Armory Field

== Year–by–year records ==
Year	Record	Finish	Manager	Attend	Playoffs/Notes
1947	71–49	2nd	Red Lucas	50,758	Lost in Finals
1948	55–81	7th	Charles Jamin	38,772	Did not qualify
1949	75–61	3rd	Red Lucas / Jim Guinn	60,038	Lost in 1st round
1950	92–43	1st	John Streza	42,796	Won league pennant Lost in 1st round

== Notable alumni ==
- Mel Bosser (1949)
- Red Lucas (1947, 1949, MGR)
- Mike Milosevich (1950)
- Charlie Osgood (1947)
- Bob Spicer (1947)
- Turkey Tyson (1949)
- Verlon Walker (1948)

=== See also ===
- Lumberton Cubs players
  Lumberton Auctioneers players
