= Tobacco State League =

American minor baseball league

- Classification: Class D (1946–1950)
- Sport: Minor League Baseball
- First season: 1946
- Folded: 1950
- President: J.E.L. Wade (1946); Arthur T. Moore (1947–1950)
- No. of teams: 13
- Country: United States of America
- Most titles: 2 Red Springs Red Robins
- Related competitions: Bi-State League

The Tobacco State League was a Class D level American minor baseball league that played for five seasons (1946–1950) in Organized Baseball in the state of North Carolina. The Red Springs Red Robins won two league championships.

== History ==
The Tobacco State League was one of many low-level minor leagues that flourished immediately after World War II before disbanding in the 1950s. Founded as a six-team circuit in 1946, the league sported eight teams for the final four years of its existence, although one of its teams, the charter member Smithfield-Selma Leafs, was forced to drop out during the closing weeks of the TSL's final 1950 season. With the exceptions of Lumberton (Chicago Cubs) and Red Springs (Philadelphia Athletics), its members were unaffiliated with Major League Baseball farm systems.

== Member teams ==
Tobacco State League Teams
- Angier, NC & Fuquay Springs, NC: Angier-Fuquay Springs Bulls 1946 (Champions, 1946)
- Clinton, NC: Clinton Blues1946–1948; Clinton Sampson Blues 1949–1950
- Dunn, NC & Erwin, NC: Dunn-Erwin Twins 1946–1950
- Fayetteville, NC: Fayetteville Scotties 1949
- Lumberton, NC: Lumberton Cubs 1947–1948; Lumberton Auctioneers 1949–1950
- Red Springs, NC: Red Springs Red Robins 1947–1950 (Champions, 1948, 1949)
- Rockingham, NC: Rockingham Eagles 1950 (Champions, 1950)
- Sanford, NC: Sanford Spinners 1946–1950 (Champions, 1947)
- Smithfield, NC & Selma, NC: Smithfield-Selma Leafs 1946–1950
- Warsaw, NC: Warsaw Red Sox 1947–1948
- Whiteville, NC: Whiteville Tobs 1950
- Wilmington, NC: Wilmington Pirates 1946–1950

== Standings & statistics ==
1946 Tobacco League Standings
Team standings	W	L	PCT	GB	Managers
Sanford Spinners	71	48	.597	-	Gaither Riley / Zeb Harrington
Clinton Blues	70	48	.593	½	Willie Duke / Van Lingle Mungo
Smithfield-Selma Leafs	58	62	.483	13½	Mike Balas
Angier-Fuquay Springs Bulls	57	62	.479	14	Paul Dunlap / Gaither Riley
Wilmington Pirates	52	66	.441	18½	Stan Katkaveck / Gus Brittain
Dunn-Erwin Twins	48	70	.407	22½	James Guinn / Alton Stephenson; Dwight Law

Playoffs: Angier-Fuquay 4 games, Sanford 2; Clinton 4 games, Springfield 1.
Finals: Angier-Fuquay 4 games, Clinton 3.

1946 league leaders
Player	Team	Stat	Tot	Player	Team	Stat	Tot
Willie Duke	Clinton	BA	.393	Robert Keane	Clinton	W	23
Lonnie H. Smith	Clinton	Runs	117	George Bortz	Sanford	SO	193
Leo Niezgoda	Smith/Selma	Hits	173	Robert Keane	Clinton	PCT	.852; 23-4
Orville Nesselrode	Sanford	RBI	150				
Orville Nesselrode	Sanford	HR	30				

1947 Tobacco State League standings
Team standings	W	L	PCT	GB	Attend	Managers
Sanford Spinners	86	39	.688	-	37,517	Zeb Harrington
Lumberton Cubs	71	49	.592	12½	50,758	Red Lucas
Wilmington Pirates	68	57	.544	18	63,219	Nate Andrews
Dunn-Erwin Twins	62	62	.500	23½	49,262	Jack Bell / Bill Auerette
Warsaw Red Sox	59	64	.480	26	36,865	James Milner
Clinton Blues	56	67	.455	29	36,778	Robert Hall / Van Lingle Mungo; Survern Wright
Red Springs Red Robins	47	78	.480	39	21,000	Red Norris
Smithfield-Selma Leafs	46	79	.368	40	28,847	Mike Balas / Joe Eonta

Playoffs: Sanford 4 games, Wilmington 3; Lumberton 4 games, Dunn-Erwin 1.
Finals: Sanford 4 games, Lumberton 3.

1947 league leaders
Player	Team	Stat	Tot	Player	Team	Stat	Tot
Jimmy Wilson	Sanford	BA	.385	Lewis Cheshire	Wilmington	W	19
Jimmy Wilson	Sanford	Runs	133	Carl Johnson	Warsaw	SO	225
Jimmy Wilson	Sanford	Hits	205	John McFadden	Sanford	ERA	2.44
Orville Nesselrode	Sanford	RBI	166	John McFadden	Sanford	PCT	.750 15-5
Orville Nesselrode	Sanford	HR	32				

1948 Tobacco State League standings
Team standings	W	L	PCT	GB	Attend	Managers
Sanford Spinners	80	56	.588	-	29,374	Zeb Harrington
Wilmington Pirates	76	62	.551	5	77,842	Jim Staton
Red Springs Red Robins	75	62	.547	5½	28,410	Red Norris
Smithfield-Selma Leafs	73	65	.529	8	36,552	Sam Narron / Virgil Payne
Warsaw Red Sox	71	67	.514	10	32,482	Sam Gibson / Verne Blackwell
Clinton Blues	70	67	.511	10½	39,498	Marvin Lorenz
Lumberton Cubs	55	81	.404	25	38,772	Charlie Jamin
Dunn-Erwin Twins	49	89	.355	32	26,475	Carl McQuillen / Babe Bost; Gaither Riley

Playoffs: Sanford 4 games, Smithfield-Selma 1; Red Springs 4 games, Wilmington 3.
Finals: Red Springs 4 games, Sanford 1.

1948 league leaders
Player	Team	Stat	Tot	Player	Team	Stat	Tot
Hargrove Davis	Wilmington	BA	.366	Aaron Osofsky	Smithfield-Selma	W	24
Jimmy Wilson	Sanford	Runs	145	John Cheshire	Wilmington	SO	258
Jimmy Wilson	Sanford	Hits	212	John Cheshire	Wilmington	ERA	2.35
Orville Nesselrode	Sanford	RBI	159	Aaron Osofsky	Smithfield-Selma	PCT	.828 24-5
Orville Nesselrode	Sanford	HR	27				

1949 Tobacco State League standings
Team standings	W	L	PCT	GB	Attend	Managers
Dunn-Erwin Twins	81	54	.600	-	39,335	Jim Staton
Red Springs Red Robins	76	59	.563	5	33,303	Red Norris
Lumberton Auctioneers	75	61	.551	6½	60,038	Charles Lucas / James Guinn
Sanford Spinners	71	62	.530	9	36,046	Zeb Harrington
Smithfield-Selma Leafs	70	65	.519	11	41,618	Virgil Payne / Claude Weaver; Paul Kluk
Fayetteville Scotties	61	76	.445	21	56,999	Zip Payne / Joe Roseberry; Nicholas Rhabe / John Helms
Clinton Sampson Blues	60	78	.435	22½	37,496	Marvin Lorenz
Wilmington Pirates	49	88	.358	33.0	49,009	Ab Tiedemann / John Edens / Gus Brittain / Hargrove Davis

Playoffs: Dunn-Erwin 4 games, Lumberton 1; Red Springs 4 games, Sanford 2.
Finals: Red Springs 4 games, Dunn Erwin 1.

1949 league leaders
Player	Team	Stat	Tot	Player	Team	Stat	Tot
Joe Roseberry	Fayetteville	BA	.409	Clarence Condit	Dunn-Erwin	W	20
Granville Denning	Dunn-Erwin	Runs	118	Clarence Condit	Dunn-Erwin	SO	264
Nicholas Perchia	Clinton	Runs	118	Leslie Price	Clinton	ERA	2.19
Granville Denning	Dunn-Erwin	Hits	185	John Bennett	Smithfield-Selma	PCT	.769 10-3
Granville Denning	Dunn-Ervin	RBI	119				
Joseph Stern	Clin/Lumb	HR	15				
John Helms	Fayetteville	HR	15				

1950 Tobacco State League standings
Team standings	W	L	PCT	GB	Attend	Managers
Lumberton Auctioneers	92	43	.682	-	42,796	John Streza
Sanford Spinners	90	44	.672	1½	19,686	Zeb Harrington
Red Springs Red Robins	68	61	.527	21	26,198	Ducky Detweiler
Rockingham Eagles	63	69	.477	27½	31,806	Jack Bell / Turkey Tyson
Clinton Sampson Blues	61	72	.459	30	29,060	Alvin Kluttz / Nicholas Rhabe; Marvin Lorenz
Wilmington Pirates	56	75	.427	34	35,950	Bill Hamons / Red Teague; Steve Collins
Dunn-Erwin Twins / Whiteville Tobs	39	92	.298	51	20,839	Jim Staton
Smithfield-Selma Leafs	49	62	.441	NA	19,369	Marvin Lorenz

Playoffs: Rockingham 4 games, Lumberton 2; Stanford 4 games, Red Springs 0;
Finals: Rockingham 4 games, Stanford 3

1950 league leaders
Player	Team	Stat	Tot	Player	Team	Stat	Tot
Granville Denning	Whiteville	BA	.374	Hoyt Clegg	Sanford	W	24
Granville Denning	Whiteville	Hits	176	Richard Causey	Sanford	SO	148
Pierre Ethier	Lumberton	Runs	146	Clayton Andrews	Sanford	ERA	2.63
Mike Milosevich	Lumberton	RBI	121	John Lagan	Lumberton	PCT	.875 21-3
Mike Milosevich	Lumberton	HR	14				
