= Enrique Wilson =

Dominican baseball player (born 1973)

- Infielder
- Born: July 27, 1973 (age 53); Santo Domingo, Dominican Republic
- Batted: Switch Threw: Right

MLB debut
- September 24, 1997, for the Cleveland Indians

Last MLB appearance
- June 24, 2005, for the Chicago Cubs

MLB statistics
- Batting average: .244
- Home runs: 22
- Runs batted in: 141
- Stats at Baseball Reference

Teams
- Cleveland Indians (1997–2000); Pittsburgh Pirates (2000–2001); New York Yankees (2001–2004); Chicago Cubs (2005)

Enrique Wilson Martes (born July 27, 1973) is a Dominican former professional baseball player. In his eight-season Major League Baseball career, Wilson played with the Cleveland Indians (1997–2000), Pittsburgh Pirates (2000–01), New York Yankees (2001–04), and Chicago Cubs (2005) as a utility infielder. He batted switch and threw right-handed.

== Playing career ==
Wilson was a career .244 hitter with 22 home runs, with three grand slams, and 141 RBI in 555 games. Versatile around the diamond, Wilson played (mostly as a backup) at second base, third and shortstop.

Wilson was known to play hitters well and with a strong arm, had some pop in his bat, and would run occasionally, but did not to try to steal very often. During his time with the Yankees, he was often placed over superior players when the team faced Boston Red Sox ace Pedro Martínez. This was due to his inexplicable ability to hit Martinez well over his career. In 35 at bats including the postseason, Wilson batted .364 vs Martinez.

In 2001, Wilson was scheduled to be on American Airlines Flight 587 that crashed in a New York City neighborhood. However, when the Yankees lost the 2001 World Series to the Arizona Diamondbacks, he flew home a few days earlier and was not on the flight.

In 2003, Wilson was involved in an incident where Manny Ramirez missed a game claiming to have a sore throat, but was later found to actually have been partying in a hotel room with him.

Wilson was signed by the Baltimore Orioles to a minor-league contract before the 2005 season. He was released in May, and subsequently signed with the Cubs. After appearing in fifteen games with the Cubs, he was released a second time. In 2006, Wilson played for the Boston Red Sox's Triple-A team, the Pawtucket Red Sox, and retired in August.

== Coaching career ==
On February 18, 2026, the Chicago Cubs announced Wilson as the manager for the Dominican Summer League Cubs.

== Sources ==
- The ESPN Baseball Encyclopedia – Gary Gillette, Peter Gammons, Pete Palmer. Publisher: Sterling Publishing, 2005. Format: Paperback, 1824pp. Language: English. ISBN 1-4027-4771-3
