= Red Springs Red Robins =

- 1947–1950; Red Springs, North Carolina

Minor league affiliations
- Class: Class D (1947–1950)
- League: Tobacco State League (1947–1950)

Major league affiliations
- Team: Philadelphia Athletics (1947–1950)

Minor league titles
- League titles (2): 1948; 1949
- Wild card berths (3): 1948; 1949; 1950

Team data
- Name: Red Springs Red Robins (1947–1950)
- Ballpark: Robbins Park (1947–1950)

The Red Springs Red Robins were a minor league baseball team based in Red Springs, North Carolina. From 1947 to 1950, the Red Springs Red Robins played exclusively as members of the Class D level Tobacco State League, winning league championships in 1948 and 1949. The Red Robins were a minor league affiliate of the Philadelphia Athletics for their duration. The 1969 Red Springs Twins succeeded the Red Robins, playing as members of the Class A level Carolina League.

== History ==
Red Springs, North Carolina first hosted minor league play in 1947. The Red Springs Red Robins began play as members of the eight–team Class D level Tobacco State League as a minor league affiliate of the Philadelphia Athletics. The Clinton Blues, Dunn-Erwin Twins, Lumberton Cubs, Sanford Spinners, Smithfield-Selma Leafs, Warsaw Red Sox and Wilmington Pirates joined Red Springs in league play.

The Red Springs minor league franchise was formed in 1947. The Tobacco State League expanded from six to eight teams, adding the Lumberton Cubs and Red Springs as new members for the 1947 season. It was reported the president of the franchise was Connie Mack, with Arthur Ehlers serving as vice-president and local resident Tom Cope also serving as business manager..

The Red Springs Red Robins' opening game was held on the road at the Lumberton Cubs on April 24, 1947. It was noted the Fairmont and Lumberton High School bands performed, as Reverend R.L. Alexander served as master of ceremonies. Lumberton Mayor “Rom” A. Hedgpeth addressed the 3,000 fans in attendance before the game. Red Springs then defeated Lumberton 14–3 in the opening game.

In their first season of play, the 1947 Red Springs Red Robins finished in seventh place. Playing in the eight–team league, Red Springs ended the regular season with a 47–78 record, playing under manager Red Norris, who would manage the team for three seasons, winning two championships. Red Springs finished the 1947 season 39.0 games behind the first place Sanford Spinners in the final regular season standings. The Red Springs Red Robins did not qualify for the playoffs in 1947, but proceeded to win league championships in 1948 and 1949.

In 1948, the Red Springs Red Robins were champions of the Class D level Tobacco State League. The Red Robins ended the regular season in third place with an 75–62 record, playing under returning manager Red Norris. Red Springs finished 5.5 games behind the first place Sanford Spinners in the final regular season standings. In the playoffs, the Red Robins defeated the Wilmington Pirates 4 games to 3 in the first round. In the Finals, the Red Springs Red Robins won the championship by defeating the Sanford Spinners 4 games to 1.

Red Springs defended their championship and won the 1949 Tobacco State League title. The Red Springs Red Robins placed second in the eight–team league. The Red Robins finished the regular season with a record of 76–59, playing under manager Red Norris and finished 6.5 games behind the first place Dunn-Erwin Twins in the regular season standings. In the 1st round of the playoffs, Red Springs defeated the Sanford Spinners 4 games to 2 and advanced. In the Finals, the Red Robins won their second consecutive championship by defeating the Dunn-Erwin Twins 4 games to 1.

In their final season, the 1950 Red Springs Red Robins reportedly formed a partnership with nearby Laurinburg, North Carolina in Tobacco State League play. On July 12, 1950, in a notable game, John Gerace of the Lumberton Auctioneers threw a no-hitter in a 5–0 victory over the Red Robins. With a 68–61 regular season record, the Red Robins placed third in the 1950 regular season standings, finishing 21.0 games behind the first place Lumberton Auctioneers in the final regular season standings. Led by manager Ducky Detweiler, the Red Robins proceeded to the playoffs, losing to the Sanford Spinners 4 games to 0. The Tobacco State League permanently folded following the 1950 season.

In 1969, minor league baseball returned to Red Springs, North Carolina for one season. The Red Springs Twins played the 1969 season as a minor league affiliate of the Minnesota Twins in the Class A level Carolina League.

Red Springs, North Carolina has not hosted another minor league team.

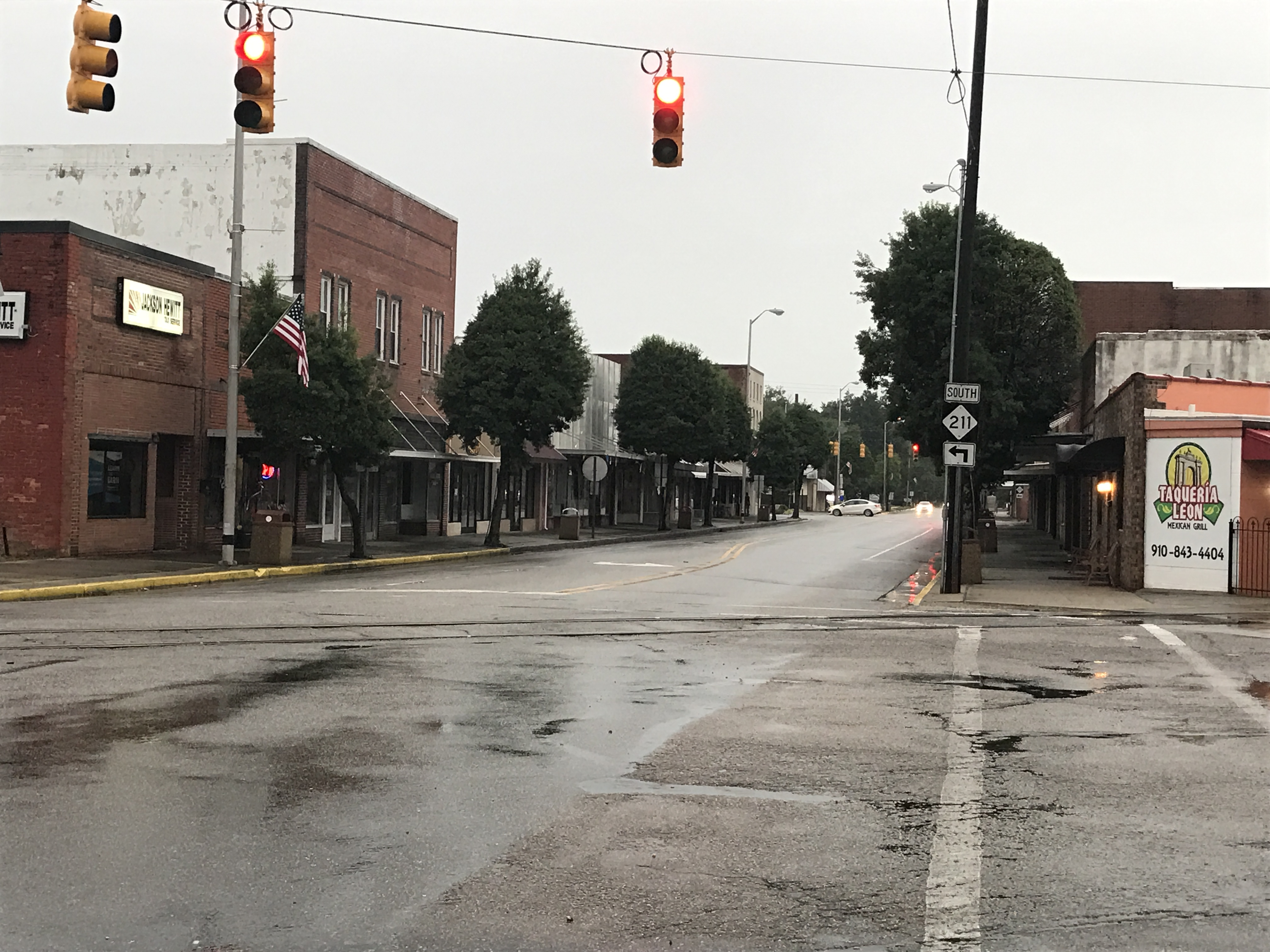
(2019) Red Springs, North Carolina

== The ballpark ==
The Red Springs minor league teams were noted to have played home games at Robbins Park. The ballpark was reportedly owned by a local mill and had a capacity of 2,500, with filed dimensions (Left, Center, Right) of 350–395–350. The ballpark was noted to have been located on State Highway 72, near Porsha Drive, Red Springs, North Carolina.

== Timeline ==
Year(s)	# Yrs.	Team	Level	League	Affiliate	Ballpark
1947–1950	4	Red Springs Red Robins	Class D	Tobacco State League	Philadelphia Athletics	Robbins Park

== Year–by–year records ==
Year	Record	Finish	Manager	Attend	Playoffs/Notes
1947	47–78	7th	Red Norris	21,000	Did not qualify
1948	75–62	3rd	Red Norris	28,410	League champions
1949	76–59	2nd	Red Norris	33,303	League champions
1950	68–61	3rd	Ducky Detweiler	26,158	Lost in 1st round

== Notable alumni ==
- Ducky Detweiler (1950, MGR)
- Bill Harrington (1949)

=== See also ===
Red Springs Red Robins players
