= Dunn-Erwin Twins =

Dunn–Erwin Twins
- 1946–1950; Dunn, North Carolina

Minor league affiliations
- Class: Class D (1946–1950)
- League: Tobacco State League (1946–1950)

Major league affiliations
- Team: None

Minor league titles
- League titles (0): None
- Conference titles (1): 1949
- Wild card berths (1): 1947

Team data
- Name: Dunn–Erwin Twins (1946–1950)
- Ballpark: Dunn High School Park (1946–1950)

The Dunn–Erwin Twins were a minor league baseball team based in Dunn, North Carolina in partnership with neighboring Erwin, North Carolina. From 1946 to 1950, the Dunn–Erwin teams played exclusively as members of the Class D level Tobacco State League.

The Twins hosted minor league home games at the Dunn High School Park.

== History ==
Dunn, North Carolina first hosted minor league play in 1946, with the team playing in partnership with neighboring Erwin, North Carolina. The Dunn–Erwin "Twins" became charter members of the six–team Class D level Tobacco State League. The Angier–Fuquay Springs Bulls, Clinton Blues, Sanford Spinners, Smithfield–Selma Leafs and Wilmington Pirates teams joined Dunn–Erwin as charter members in Tobacco State League play.

In their first season of minor league play, the 1946 Dunn–Erwin Twins finished last in the Tobacco State League standings. The Twins finished the 1946 Tobacco State League regular season with a 48–70 record to place sixth, finishing 22.5 games behind the first place Sanford Spinners. Playing under managers James Guinn, Alton Stephenson and Dwight Law, Dunn–Erwin did not qualify for the four-team playoffs, won by the Angier–Fuquay Springs Bulls.

In 1947, J.E. Jackson was selected as president of the Dunn–Erwin Twins, with E.M. Bost serving as vice–president and C.J. Adams as business manager.

Continuing Tobacco State League play, the 1947 Dunn–Erwin Twins finished in fourth place and reached the playoffs as the league expanded to eight teams. Playing under managers Jack Bell and Bill Auerette in the eight–team league, Dunn–Erwin ended the regular season with a 62–62 record. The Twins finished 23.5 games behind the first place Sanford Spinners in the regular season standings. In the first round of the playoffs, the Lumberton Cubs defeated the Dunn-Erwin Twins 4 games to 1, as the Sanford Spinners eventually became the league champions.

In 1948, the Dunn–Erwin Twins continued play and finished last in the Tobacco State League standings. The Twins ended the regular season in eighth place with a 49–89 record, playing under managers Carl McQuillen, Babe Bost and Gaither Riley. The Twins finished 32.0 games behind the first placed Sanford Spinners in the final Tobacco State League standings. Dunn–Erwin did not qualify for the playoffs, won by the Red Springs Red Robins.

The 1949 Dunn–Erwin Twins won the Tobacco State League pennant and advanced to the finals. The Twins ended the regular season with a record of 84–54, playing under manager Jim Staton and finished 5.0 games ahead of the second place Red Springs Red Robins in the regular season standings. In the first round of the playoffs, the Dunn-Erwin Twins defeated the Lumberton Auctioneers 4 games to 1 and advanced. In the Finals, the Red Springs Red Robins defeated the Dunn-Erwin Twins 4 games to 1. Pitcher Clarence Condit of Dunn-Erwin led the Tobacco State League with both 20 wins and 264 strikeouts, while teammate Granville Denning led the league with 119 RBI.

In their final season, the 1950 Dunn–Erwin Twins relocated during the season and finished last in the Tobacco State League standings. On June 16, 1950, the Dunn-Erwin Twins, with a record of 11–34 moved to Whiteville, North Carolina. Finishing the season as the Whiteville Tobs, the team compiled a record of 28–48 based in Whiteville. Overall, the team finished with a record of 39–92, to place eighth, missing the Tobacco State League playoffs. Playing under returning manager Jim Staton, the Twins/Tobs finished 51.0 games behind the first place Lumberton Auctioneers. The Twins/Tobs team failed to qualify for the playoffs, won by the Rockingham Eagles. The Tobacco State League folded as a minor league following the conclusion of the 1950 season and never reformed.

After the Tobacco State League failed to reform for the 1951 season, Dunn, North Carolina has not hosted another minor league team.

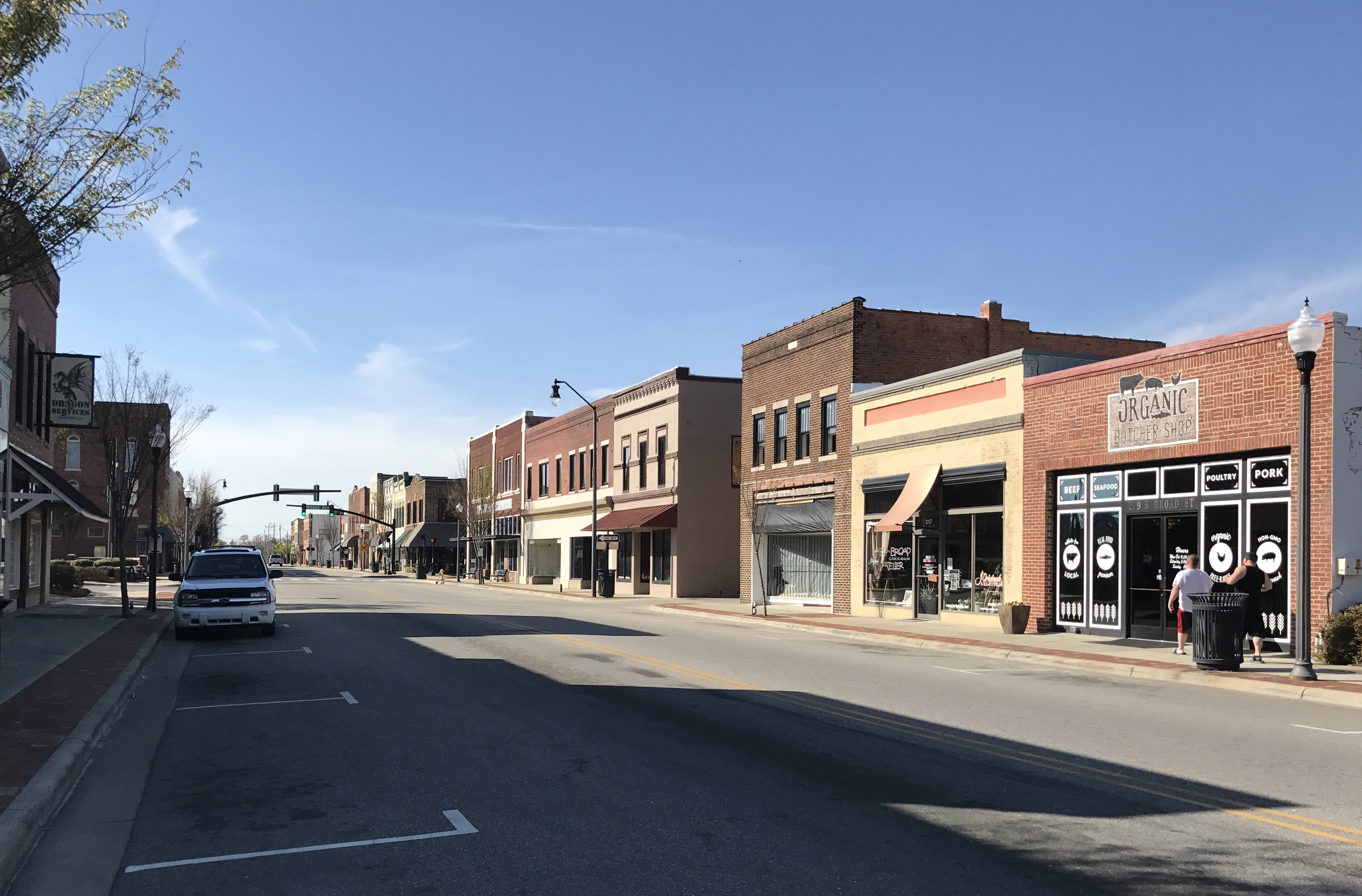
(2019) Downtown Dunn. National Register of Historic Places. Dunn, North Carolina

== The ballpark ==
The Dunn, North Carolina–based minor league teams were noted to have hosted home minor league games at the Dunn High School Park. Dunn High School was turned into a middle school in 1985 and the building was torn down in 1996. Today, the site houses Dunn Elementary School. Dunn Elementary School is located at 800 West Harnett Street in Dunn.

== Timeline ==
Year(s)	# Yrs.	Team	Level	League	Affiliate	Ballpark
1946–1950	5	Dunn–Erwin Twins	Class D	Tobacco State League	None	Dunn High School Park

== Year–by–year records ==
Year	Record	Finish	Manager	Attend	Playoffs/Notes
1946	48–70	6th	James Guinn / Alton Stephenson / Dwight Law	47,174	Did not qualify
1947	62–62	4th	Jack Bell / Bill Auerette	42,262	Lost in 1st round
1948	49–89	8th	Carl McQuillen / Babe Bost / Gaither Riley	26,475	Did not qualify
1949	84–54	1st	Jim Staton	39,335	Won league pennant Lost in finals
1950	39–92	8th	Jim Staton	20,839	Dunn-Erwin (11–34) moved to Whiteville June 16

== Notable alumni ==
- Duke Maas (1949)
