= Bill Harrington (baseball) =

American baseball player (1928–2022)

- Pitcher
- Born: October 3, 1928; Sanford, North Carolina, U.S.
- Died: January 21, 2022 (aged 93); Garner, North Carolina, U.S.
- Batted: Right Threw: Right

MLB debut
- April 16, 1953, for the Philadelphia Athletics

Last MLB appearance
- September 30, 1956, for the Kansas City Athletics

MLB statistics
- Win–loss record: 5–5
- Earned run average: 5.03
- Strikeouts: 40
- Stats at Baseball Reference

Teams
- Philadelphia / Kansas City Athletics (1953, 1955–1956)

William Womble Harrington (October 3, 1928 – January 21, 2022) was an American professional baseball pitcher. He appeared in 58 games (all but two in relief) in Major League Baseball (MLB) for the Philadelphia and Kansas City Athletics during the 1953, 1955 and 1956 seasons. He threw and batted right-handed, stood 5 feet 11 inches (1.80 m) tall and weighed 160 pounds (73 kg).

== Career ==
Harrington signed with the Athletics in 1949 and played several years of minor league baseball, winning 17, 19 and 20 games in the Class D Tobacco State League (1949), Class A Sally League (1952) and Double-A Southern Association (1958), and 115 minor league games over eleven seasons. He spent the entire 1955 campaign on the Athletics' roster and put up his best year, splitting six decisions with an earned run average of 4.11 in 34 games and 76 2/3 innings pitched. During his major league career, Harrington issued 67 walks and gave up 114 hits, with 40 strikeouts in 116 1/3 innings pitched. He retired from baseball after the 1961 season.

== Personal life ==
Harrington died on January 21, 2022, in Garner, North Carolina.
