= Dominican Summer League Cubs =

- Boca Chica

Minor league affiliations
- Class: Rookie
- League: Dominican Summer League
- Division: Central Division (Blue); Southwest Division (Red)

Major league affiliations
- Team: Chicago Cubs

Minor league titles
- League titles (0): None

Team data
- Name: Cubs
- Ballpark: Baseball City Complex
- Owner(s)/ Operator(s): Chicago Cubs
- Manager: Enrique Wilson (Blue); Carlos Ramirez (Red)

The Dominican Summer League Cubs or DSL Cubs are a rookie league affiliate of the Chicago Cubs based in the Dominican Republic playing in the Dominican Summer League. Chicago currently operates two DSL teams: the DSL Cubs Blue and DSL Cubs Red.

== History ==
The team began in 1991 with a joint affiliation with the Kansas City Royals. An affiliation with the Colorado Rockies was added in 1992.

For the 1993 season, the team shared an affiliation with the Texas Rangers. They then shared an affiliation with the San Diego Padres for the next three seasons (1994–1996).

The team became independently affiliated with the Cubs in 1997. From 2008 to 2012, the team split into two squads as DSL Cubs 1 and DSL Cubs 2, but became a unified team again for the 2013 season.

== Roster ==
Dominican Summer League Cubs Blue roster
| Players | | Coaches/Other |
| Pitchers: -- Frailin Alejo; -- Cristopher Aranguren; -- Jider Corpas; 71 Gabriel De La Cruz; -- Frankelly Desis; -- Roni Dias; -- Angel Gonzalez; 57 Jeremy Guzman; -- Erick Hernandez; -- Luis Mata; 82 Ismael Morey; -- Chaily Ramirez; -- Ariel Ramos; -- Amilkar Romero; -- Angel Sanmartin; -- Jose Urena; -- Geovanny Villarroel | Catchers: -- Daniel Campos; -- Victor Garcia; Infielders: -- Julio Acosta; 5 Darlyn De Leon; -- Ronnyel Espinoza; 7 Juan Monso; -- Ezequiel Pena; -- Enyel Rosario; -- Luis Santos; -- Juan Tomas; Outfielders: -- Breyner Figuereo; -- Luis Leon; -- Robin Ortiz; 41 Josias Ramirez; -- Saul Ramirez; -- Luis Sanchez; 27 Julio Valdez | Manager: -- Enrique Wilson; Coaches: -- Osvaldo Aquino (pitching); -- Raymond Pena (hitting); 7-day injured list * On Chicago Cubs 40-man roster ~ Development list # Rehab assignment ∞ Reserve list ‡ Restricted list § Suspended list † Temporarily inactive list Roster updated May 30, 2025; Transactions → More rosters: MiLB • Dominican Summer League → Chicago Cubs minor league players |

Dominican Summer League Cubs Red roster
| Players | | Coaches/Other |
| Pitchers: 52 Carlos Barrientos; 74 Salvador Burgos; 59 Alberto Chala; -- Noel Chirinos ‡; 95 Anthony Feliz; -- Tadeo Gamez ‡; 63 Luis Ghisays; 65 Angel Gonzalez; 50 Jordan Henriquez; 85 Johansel Javier; 70 Bryan Landaez; 77 Emannoel Madeira; 76 Ismael Morey; -- Wilfran Ortega ‡; 55 Carlos Rangel; 56 Jubrayker Salaya; 46 Saul Siri; 84 Darlin Ventura | Catchers: 28 Ivan Cespedes; 40 Diego Gonzalez; 16 Abraham Sanchez; Infielders: 4 Luis Abreu; 11 Juan Cabada; 15 Wilfri De La Cruz; 20 Elerick Gomez; 29 Alexander Herrera; 5 Luis Maldonado; 3 Leonel Vivas; Outfielders: 22 Freiker Betencourt; 24 Fernando Lara; 21 Luis Leon; 25 Jhon Lucena; 2 Jahni McPhee; 12 Jeury Ramirez | Manager: -- Carlos Ramirez; Coaches: -- Jhonny Bethencourt (hitting); -- Jovanny Rosario (coach); -- Jordal Williams (pitching); 60-day injured list: -- Rafael Merchan; 77 Santiago Payares; 7-day injured list * On Chicago Cubs 40-man roster ~ Development list # Rehab assignment ∞ Reserve list ‡ Restricted list § Suspended list † Temporarily inactive list Roster updated June 2, 2025; Transactions → More rosters: MiLB • Dominican Summer League → Chicago Cubs minor league players |
