= Ducky Detweiler =

American baseball player (1919-2013)

- Third baseman
- Born: February 15, 1919; Trumbauersville, Pennsylvania, U.S.
- Died: March 13, 2013 (aged 94); Easton, Maryland, U.S.
- Batted: Right Threw: Right

MLB debut
- September 12, 1942, for the Boston Braves

Last MLB appearance
- June 1, 1946, for the Boston Braves

MLB statistics
- Batting average: .311
- At bats: 45
- Hits: 14
- Stats at Baseball Reference

Teams
- Boston Braves (1942, 1946)

Robert Sterling "Ducky" Detweiler (February 15, 1919 – March 13, 2013) was an American professional baseball infielder and manager. Listed at 5 feet 11 inches (1.80 m) tall and 178 pounds (81 kg), he batted and threw right handed.

Born in Trumbauersville, Pennsylvania, Detweiler was one of many promising young ballplayers whose careers were interrupted by military service during World War II.

Following his graduation from Quakertown High School in 1938, Detweiler moved to Federalsburg, Maryland in 1939. He then became a well known sports figure in an area that involved baseball, basketball, and football, while serving as an official, umpire, and assignor of games. That year he signed a contract with the Philadelphia Athletics and played for their affiliate team, the Federalsburg Athletics of the Eastern Shore League. The Federalsburg team paid him $75 a month during the 1939 ESL season. This class-D league contract was Detweiler's first of many in professional baseball, and he responded with a .292 batting average and 10 home runs in 98 games as a second baseman/outfielder, while helping the team clinch the league pennant.

In 1940, Detweiler gained a promotion to the Wilmington Blue Rocks of the Class B Interstate League, where he switched to third base and batted .313 with a .472 slugging percentage in 93 games. In 1941 he was traded to the Boston Bees organization, opening the year in the PONY League with the Bradford Bees before joining the Bridgeport Bees of the Interstate League during the midseason, batting a combined .310 average and a slugging of .448 in 106 games.

Detweiler opened 1942 with the Evansville Bees of the Illinois–Indiana–Iowa League, a year after Joe DiMaggio's famous 56-game hitting streak. Detweiler then went on a hitting rampage of his own, as he hit safely during 40 consecutive games in the Three-I League to lead Evansville with a .341 average, also leading the team in hits (149), home runs (16), runs batted in (106), extra bases (46), total bases (237), slugging (.520) and games played (120). He was called up to the renamed Boston Braves and made his Major League debut in late September. He appeared in 12 games and batted .318 (14-for-44), including two doubles and one triple, while driving in five runs and scoring three times.

After being drafted to military service, he served as a Private First Class in the US Army from 1943 to 1945. Assigned to the 1301st Service Unit, he regularly played for the New Cumberland Reception Center baseball team with teammates Tommy Hughes, Pat Mullin, Fred Caligiuri and Harry Marnie. He later was transferred to Camp Siebert in Alabama, a replacement training center for the Chemical Warfare Service. Then, along with Hughes, Mullin and Steve Sundra, Detweiler helped make the Camp Siebert Gashouse Gang one of the most dominant forces in southern states military baseball between 1944 and 1945.

Detweiler returned to the Braves in 1946, but went hitless in one pinch-hitting appearance before being assigned to Indianapolis of the American Association. In midseason he was dealt to the St. Louis Cardinals and finished the year with Rochester of the International League, batting a combined .230 in 99 games.

In 1947, Detweiler was released at his own request and returned to the Federalsburg A's of the Eastern Shore League, where he had started his professional career eight years earlier, and posted a .352 average with 29 home runs and 133 RBIs. In 1950, Detweiler served as player/manager of the Red Springs Red Robins of the Tobacco State League, a Philadelphia Athletics farm club. He continued to play and manage in the minors until 1952, compiling a .316 average and a.502 of slugging percentage in 11 minor league seasons. In addition, he finished with a managing record of 207–290 (.416) in a span of four seasons between 1948 and 1952.

After retiring from baseball, Detweiler ran a tavern called Ducky's Tavern from 1960 to 1969 which he took over from his father-in-law. He finished his employment days as a letter carrier for the U.S. Postal Service, retiring in 1984 after 20 years of service.

Detweiler married Jean Cahall in 1944. They raised a daughter, Gina, and had two granddaughters and two great-grandchildren. He was a long time resident of Easton, Maryland, where he died in 2013 at the age of 94.

== Sources ==
- Johnson, Lloyd; Wolff, Miles (1993). Encyclopedia of Minor League Baseball. Baseball America. ISBN 978-0-96-371898-3
