= Mike Balas =

American baseball player (1910–1996)

- Pitcher
- Born: May 9, 1910; Lowell, Massachusetts, U.S.
- Died: October 15, 1996 (aged 86); Westford, Massachusetts, U.S.
- Batted: Right Threw: Right

MLB debut
- April 27, 1938, for the Boston Bees

Last MLB appearance
- April 27, 1938, for the Boston Bees

MLB statistics
- Win–loss record: 0–0
- Earned run average: 6.75
- Strikeouts: 0
- Stats at Baseball Reference

Teams
- Boston Bees (1938)

Mitchell Francis "Mike" Balas (May 9, 1910 – October 15, 1996) was an American Major League Baseball pitcher who appeared in one game in with the Boston Bees in 1938.

Balas entered professional baseball in 1929 playing for the Brockton Shoemakers of the New England League. After moving around the minors for the next 9 years, he played in his only MLB game on April 27, 1938. In that game, he pitched 1 1/3 innings facing 8 batters, surrendering 3 runs (1 earned), walking and striking out none. Following the game he returned to the minors and continued there until 1940. He also was a minor league manager from 1945 to 1948.

Balas was a Jehovah's Witness and in 1942 was prosecuted in the United States District Court for the District of Massachusetts for failing to report to a conscientious objector camp during World War II. He was sentenced by U.S. District Judge George Clinton Sweeney to three years in federal prison.
