= Clinton Sampson Blues =

- 1946–1950; Clinton, North Carolina

Minor league affiliations
- Class: Class D (1946–1950)
- League: Tobacco State League (1946–1950)

Major league affiliations
- Team: Detroit Tigers (1948)

Minor league titles
- League titles (0): None
- Wild card berths (1): 1946

Team data
- Name: Clinton Blues (1946–1948); Clinton Sampson Blues (1949–1950)
- Ballpark: Clinton High School Park (1946–1950)

The Clinton Sampson Blues was the final nickname of the minor league baseball teams based in Clinton, North Carolina and within Sampson County, North Carolina. From 1946 to 1950, the Clinton-based teams played exclusively as members of the Class D level Tobacco State League. The franchise first played as the "Clinton Blues" from 1946 to 1948.

The Clinton Blues were a minor league affiliate of the Detroit Tigers in 1948.

The Blues teams hosted minor league home games at the Clinton High School Park.

== History ==
Clinton, North Carolina first hosted minor league play in 1946, when the "Clinton Blues" became charter members of the six–team Class D level Tobacco State League. The Angier-Fuquay Springs Bulls, Dunn-Erwin Twins, Sanford Spinners, Smithfield-Selma Leafs and Wilmington Pirates teams joined Clinton as charter members in Tobacco State League play.

The 1946 Clinton Blues advanced to the league finals in their first season of play, their only playoff appearance. Clinton finished the 1946 Tobacco State League regular season with a 70–48 record to place second, finishing 0.5 game behind the first place Sanford Spinners. Playing under managers Willie Duke and Van Mungo, Clinton advanced to the playoffs. In the first round of the Tobacco State League playoffs, Clinton defeated the Smithfield-Selma Leafs 4 games to 1. In the finals, the Angier-Fuquay Springs Bulls defeated the Clinton Blues 4 games to 3 to win the championship. Player/manager Willie Duke of Clinton led the Tobacco State League in batting average, hitting .393, while teammate Robert Keane led the league with 23 wins as a pitcher.

Continuing Tobacco State League play, the 1947 Clinton Blues finished in sixth place. Playing under managers Robert Hall, Van Mungo, Surven Wright and E. Jackson Bell in the eight–team league, Clinton ended the regular season with a 56–67 record. Clinton finished 29.0 games behind of the first place Sanford Spinners in the regular season standings, missing the playoffs. In the playoffs, Sanford became the league champions. L. C. Kerr, of Clinton, was reported to be the vice president of the Tobacco State League and president of the Clinton Blues in 1947.

The Blues' manager in 1946 and 1947, Van Mungro was the namesake of the song, Van Lingo Mungro, released as a single in 1969. "Van Lingle Mungo" was composed and performed by jazz pianist Dave Frishberg. Frishberg also wrote both the lyrics and the music. The song was distributed by Red Day Division of Doramus, Inc. under CTI Records. It was originally released as a single, but later incorporated into Oklahoma Toad, Frishberg's 1970 LP. Frishberg reportedly developed the melody first, but couldn't settle on lyrics, rejecting several sets of lyrics he drafted. Frishberg was noted to have browsed through a copy of a baseball encyclopedia, where he found the name of Van Lingle Mungo, a name he found unusual. He later found himself humming Mungo's name to the melody and incorporated it into the song. Jazz critic and author Ira Gitler considers "Van Lingle Mungo" as "one of the best jazz works of the 70s and certainly the best ever done combining jazz and baseball." The song has been entered in the National Baseball Library, a section of the National Baseball Hall of Fame.

In 1948, the Clinton Blues continued play, becoming a minor league affiliate of the Detroit Tigers. The Blues ended the regular season in sixth place with a 70–67 record, playing under manager Marvin Lorenz. The Blues finished 10.5 games behind the first placed Sanford Spinners in the final Tobacco State League standings. Clinton did not qualify for the playoffs, won by the Red Springs Red Robins.

Continuing play in the 1949 Tobacco State League, the Clinton Sampson Blues placed seventh in the eight–team league. The team's name was changed to include the location of Sampson County, North Carolina. The Blues finished the regular season with a record of 60–79, playing under manager John Streza. Clinton finished 22.5 games behind the 1st place Dunn-Erwin Twins in the regular season standings. Clinton did not qualify for the Tobacco State League playoffs, which were won by the Red Springs Red Robins.

In their final season, the 1950 Clinton Sampson Blues placed fifth, missing the Tobacco State League playoffs. With a record of 61–72, playing under managers Alvin Kluttz and Nicholas Rhabe, the Clinton Sampson Blues finished 30 games behind the first place Lumberton Auctioneers. Clinton Sampson failed to qualify for the playoffs, won by the Rockingham Eagles.

In 1950, player/manager Alvin Kluttz batted .373 for the Blues. Kluttz had been wounded in World War II, shot through the left arm during battle in 1945. After surgery, 21 pieces of shrapnel remained in his arm. Kluttz returned to his baseball career following his October 1945 discharge despite the permanent injury. Kluttz received the Bronze Star for his service.

The Tobacco State League folded following the 1950 season and did not reform. Clinton, North Carolina has not hosted another minor league team.

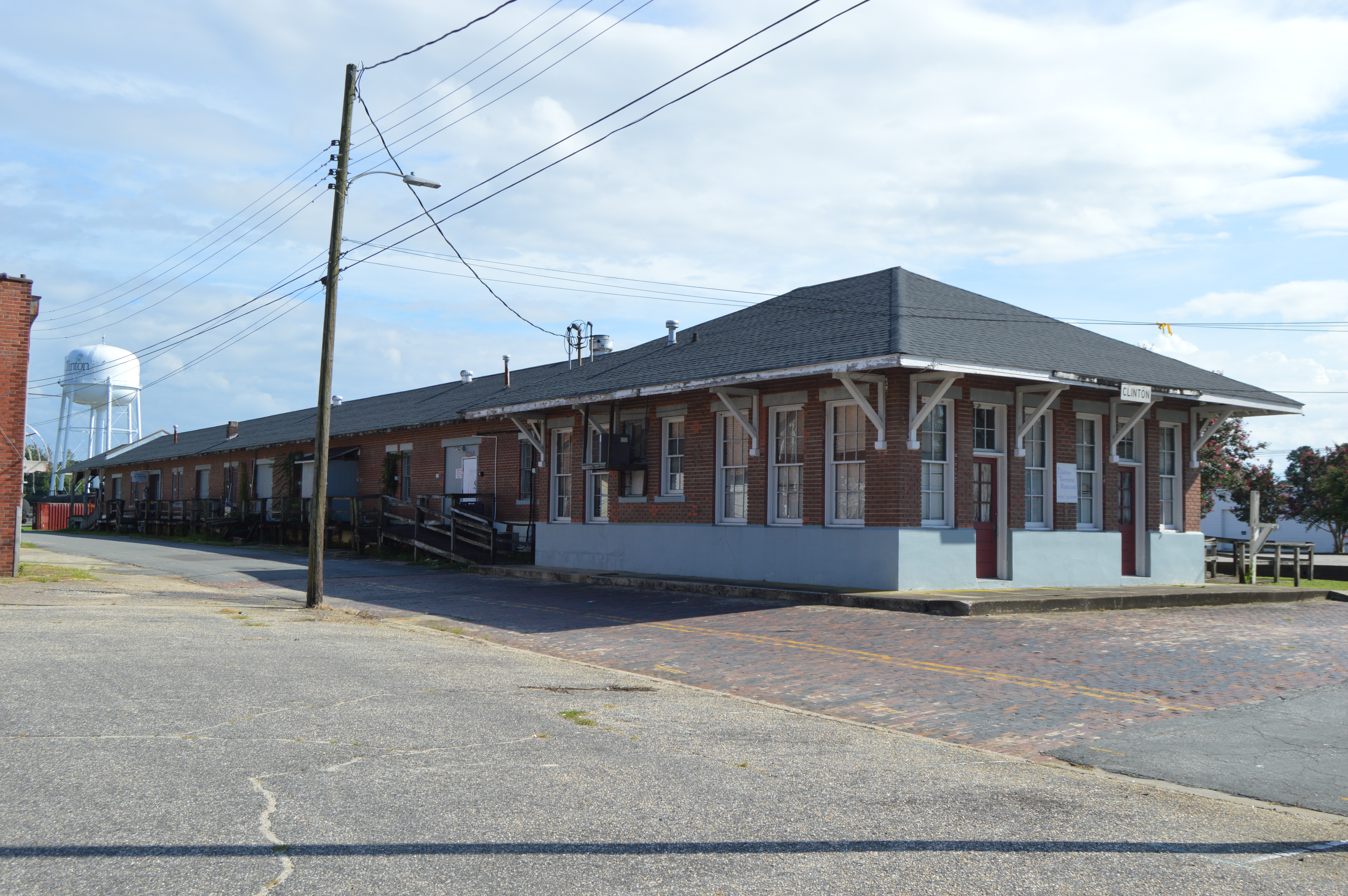
(2020) Clinton Depot, Elizabeth Street. National Register of Historic Places. Clinton, North Carolina

== The ballpark ==
The Clinton-based minor league teams were noted to have played home games at the Clinton High School Park. The location of the ballpark was reported as 1201 West Elizabeth Street, Clinton, North Carolina. Today, Sampson Middle School occupies the ballpark site with the same address.

== Timeline ==
Year(s)	# Yrs.	Team	Level	League	Affiliate	Ballpark
1946–1947	2	Clinton Blues	Class D	Tobacco State League	None	Clinton High School Park
1948	1	Clinton Blues	Class D	Tobacco State League	Detroit Tigers	Clinton High School Park
1949–1950	2	Clinton Sampson Blues	Class D	Tobacco State League	None	Clinton High School Park

== Year-by-year records ==
Year	Record	Finish	Manager	Playoffs/Notes
1946	70–48	2nd	Willie Duke / Van Mungo	Lost League Finals
1947	56–67	6th	Robert Hall / Van Mungo / Surven Wright /E. Jackson Bell	Did not qualify
1948	70–67	6th	Marvin Lorenz	Did not qualify
1949	60–79	7th	John Streza	Did not qualify
1950	61–72	5th	Alvin Kluttz; Nicholas Rhabe / Marvin Lorenz	Did not qualify

== Notable alumni ==
- John Burrows (1946)
- Earl Mossor (1946)
- Van Mungo (1946–1947, MGR) 5 x MLB All–Star

== See also ==
- Clinton Blues players
