= Sanford Spinners =

- (1941–1942, 1946–1950, 2021-Present); Sanford, North Carolina

Minor league affiliations
- Class: Class D (1941–1942, 1946–1950)
- League: Bi-State League (1941–1942); Tobacco State League (1946–1950); Old North State League (2021-Present)

Major league affiliations
- Team: None

Minor league titles
- League titles (2): 1942; 1946
- Conference titles (3): 1946; 1947; 1948
- Wild card berths (4): 1941; 1942; 1949; 1950

Team data
- Name: Sanford Spinners (1941–1942, 1946–1950, 2021-Present)
- Ballpark: Temple Park (1941–1942, 1946–1950); Tramway Park (2021-Present)

The Sanford Spinners were a professional minor league baseball team based in Sanford, North Carolina. The "Spinners" played as members of the Class D level Bi-State League in 1941 and 1942 and the Tobacco State League from 1946 to 1950, winning league championships in 1942 and 1946. The Spinners hosted minor league home games at Temple Park.

Today, the nickname has been revived by the "Sanford Spinners" amateur collegiate summer baseball team, who have played as members of the Old North State League from 2021 to Present.

== History ==
The Sanford Spinners began minor league play in 1941, when the Spinners became members of the six–team 1941 Class D level Bi-State League. The Danville-Schoolfield Leafs, Leaksville-Draper-Spray Triplets, Martinsville Manufacturers, Mayodan Millers and Mt. Airy Graniteers joined Sanford in league play.

The Sanford use of the "Spinners" moniker corresponded to local industry in the era. Beginning in 1915, Sanford was home to the Seaboard Milling Company.

In their first season of play, the Sanford Spinners won the Bi-State League championship. Sanford finished their first season with a regular season record of 58–54, placing fourth in the six–team Bi-State League standings, playing under manager Zeb Harrington. Sanford finished 7.0 games behind the first place Leaksville-Draper-Spray Triplets in the final standings. In the playoffs, Stanford won 4 games to 3 over the Martinsville Manufacturers. In the Finals Sanford defeated the Danville-Schoolfield Leafs 4 games to 2 to win the championship. Sanford pitcher Dave Odom led the Bi-State League with both 16 wins and 190 strikeouts.

The Sanford Spinners continued play in the 1942 Bi-State League, reaching the finals of the eight–team league. With a record of 62–59, Sanford placed second in the regular season standings, finishing 6.5 games behind the first place Wilson Tobos, playing under manager Frank Rogers. In the first round of the playoffs, Sanford defeated the Burlington Bees 4 games to 1 to advance. In the finals, the Rocky Mount Rocks defeated Sanford 4 games to 1. The Bi–State permanently folded following the 1942 season, with the onset of World War II.

The 1946 Sanford Spinners resumed play and won the league pennant joining a new league. Sanford became charter members of the six–team Class D level Tobacco State League. The Angier-Fuquay Springs Bulls, Clinton Blues, Dunn-Erwin Twins, Smithfield-Selma Leafs and Wilmington Pirates joined Sanford in league play.

The Spinners finished the 1946 Tobacco State League regular season with a 71–48 record to place first, finishing 0.5 game ahead of the second place Clinton Blues. Playing under managers Gaither Riley and Zeb Harrington, Sanford lost in the first round of the Tobacco State League playoffs as Angier-Fuquay defeated Sanford 4 games to 2. Orville Nesselrode of Sanford led the Tobacco State League with 30 home runs and 150 RBI. Pitcher George Bortz led the league with 193 strikeouts.

In 1947, it was reported that L.D. Isenhour, Jr. was president of the Sanford Spinners, with Sam Allen serving as business manager for the franchise.

The 1947 Sanford Spinners were Tobacco State League champions. Playing in the eight–team league, Sanford ended the regular season in first place with a 86–39 record under Zeb Harrington, who would manage the team for the remainder of its existence. Sanford finished 12.5 games ahead of the second place Lumberton Cubs. In the playoffs, Sanford first defeated the Wilmington Pirates 4 games to 2. The Spinners won the championship by defeating Lumberton 4 games 3 in the finals. Sanford's John McFadden led the league with a 15–5 record and 2.44 ERA. Jimmy Wilson of Sanford, led the league in batting average, hitting .385 and Orville Nesselrode again led the Tobacco State League with 32 home runs and 166 RBI.

In 1948, the Sanford Spinners won the Tobacco State League pennant and advanced to the league finals. With an 80–56 record under manager Zeb Harrington, Sanford finished 5.0 games ahead of the second place Wilmington Pirates. In the first round of the playoffs, Sanford defeated the Smithfield-Selma Leafs 4 games to 1. In the finals, the Red Springs Red Robins defeated Sanford 4 games to 1. Orville Nesselrode again led the league with 27 home runs and 159 RBI, while hitting .368. Jimmy Wilson of Sanford led the league with 145 runs and 212 hits.

Orville Nesselrode had reportedly suffered frostbite in World War II and wasn't considered a major league prospect. Following his playing career, Nesselrode settled in Sanford, North Carolina, opening a service station in 1954. “Hank’s,” service station was located at the corner of Endor (Horner) and Carthage Street in downtown Sanford.

Continuing play in the 1949 Tobacco State League, the Spinners placed fourth and qualified for the league playoffs. The Spinners finished the regular season with a record of 71–62 under manager Zeb Harrington and finished 9.0 games behind the first place Dunn-Erwin Twins. Sanford lost in the first round playoff series against the Red Springs Red Robins 4 games to 2.

In their final season, the 1950 Sanford Spinners advanced to the Tobacco State League finals. With a 90–44 record, the Spinners placed second in the regular season standings, finishing 1.5 games behind first place Lumberton Auctioneers. Led by manager Zeb Harrington, Sanford swept the Red Springs Red Robins in four games. In the finals, the Rockingham Eagles defeated Stanford 4 games to 3. Hoyt Clegg of Sanford led the league with 24 wins. The Tobacco State League permanently folded following the 1950 season. Sanford has not hosted another minor league team.

=== 2021 - present summer collegiate baseball ===
The Sanford Spinners came back on April 6, 2021, and Hosted their first game at Tramway part on July 7, 2021 against the Fayetteville Chutes.

== The ballpark ==
The Sanford Spinners teams were noted to have played minor league teams home games at Temple Park. The original ballpark has been torn down and was built as a Works Project Administration project in the 1930s. It was located at McIver Street and Bragg Street, Sanford, North Carolina. Today, Temple Park is still in use as a public park with ballparks.

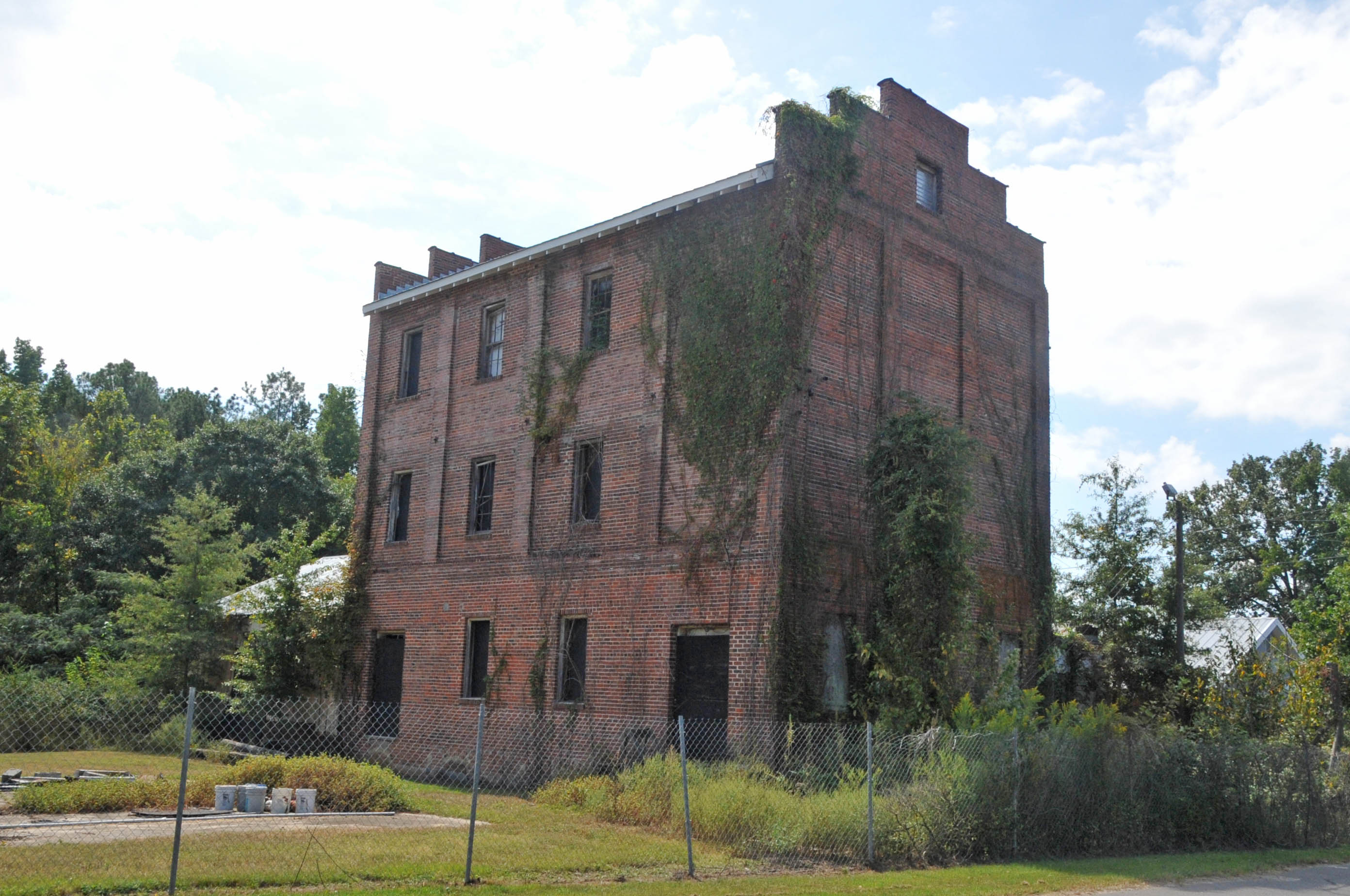
(2007) Seaboard Milling Company, AKA Seaboard OR Broadway Roller Mills. Sanford, North Carolina

== Timeline ==
Year(s)	# Yrs.	Team	Level	League	Ballpark
1941–1942	2	Sanford Spinners	Class D	Bi-State League	Temple Park
1946–1950	5	Sanford Spinners	Class D	Tobacco State League	Temple Park
2021–Present	2	Sanford Spinners	summer collegiate baseball	Old North State League	Tramway Park

== Year-by-year records ==
Year	Record	Finish	Manager	Playoffs/Notes
1941	58–54	4th	Zeb Harrington	League Champs
1942	62–59	2nd	Frank Rodgers	Lost League Finals
1946	71–48	1st	Gaither Riley / Zeb Harrington	Won pennant Lost in 1st round
1947	86–39	1st	Zeb Harrington	Won pennant League Champs
1948	80–56	1st	Zeb Harrington	Won pennant Lost League Finals
1949	71–62	4th	Zeb Harrington	Lost in 1st round
1950	90–44	2nd	Zeb Harrington	Lost League Finals

== Notable alumni ==
- Julián Acosta (1942)
- Dave Odom (1941, 1946)
- Joe Prater (1942)
- Neb Stewart (1941)
- Sanford Spinners players
