= Bob Spicer =

American baseball player (1925–2016)

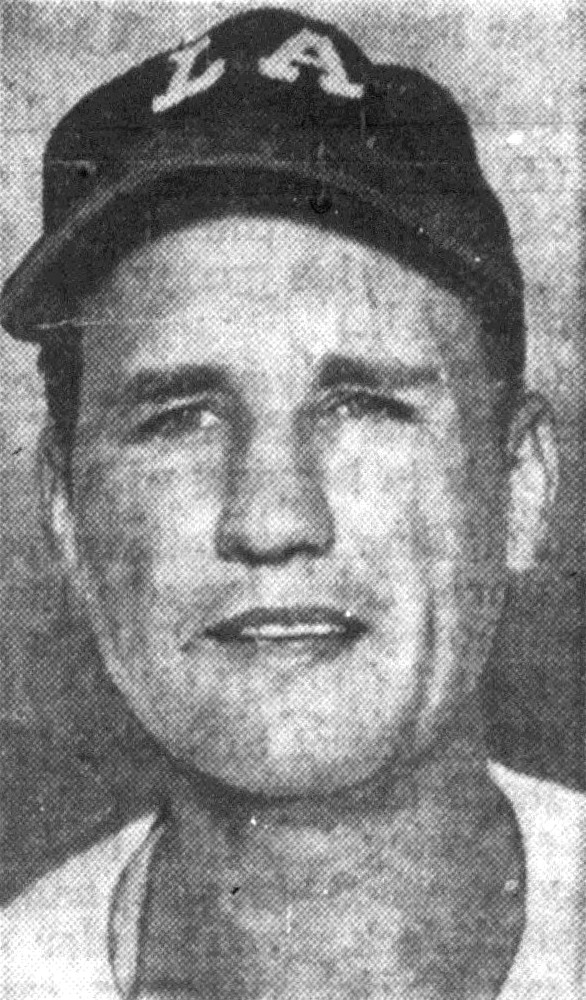
- Spicer, circa 1954
- Pitcher
- Born: April 11, 1925; Richmond, Virginia, U.S.
- Died: February 27, 2016 (aged 90); Fayetteville, North Carolina, U.S.
- Batted: Left Threw: Right

MLB debut
- April 17, 1955, for the Kansas City Athletics

Last MLB appearance
- September 22, 1956, for the Kansas City Athletics

MLB statistics
- Win–loss record: 0–0
- Earned run average: 27.00
- Innings pitched: 5
- Stats at Baseball Reference

Teams
- Kansas City Athletics (1955–1956)

Robert Oberton Spicer (April 11, 1925 – February 27, 2016) was an American professional baseball player. A right-handed pitcher and occasional outfielder, he had a highly successful 15-season minor league career (1947–1961) but played only four games as a relief pitcher in Major League Baseball for the 1955–1956 Kansas City Athletics. He batted left-handed, stood 5 feet 10 inches (1.78 m) tall and weighed 173 pounds (78 kg).

Spicer's career began in the Chicago Cubs' farm system with 16, 21 and 20-victory seasons from 1947 to 1949 in levels ranging from Class D (the lowest rung then on the minor league ladder) to Class AA. In 1949 he helped lead the Macon Peaches to the Class A Sally League championship, tying for the league lead in wins with 20, and was selected to the all-star team. He spent four full seasons with the Los Angeles Angels of the top-level Pacific Coast League before the Athletics, newly transplanted from Philadelphia, selected him in the 1954 Rule 5 draft. He was part of the first Major League team to represent Kansas City.

In his first game, April 17, 1955, at Briggs Stadium, he entered the game in the fifth inning with the Detroit Tigers already leading the Athletics, 6–0. Spicer surrendered one run in the fifth, but was unable to record an out in the sixth frame, giving up a leadoff home run to Al Kaline, a future Hall of Famer, and leaving the bases loaded. All would score in an eventual 16–0 Tiger win. Spicer appeared in one more game for Kansas City that season, on April 23 at home against the Chicago White Sox at Municipal Stadium. Again he was treated roughly, surrendering two more home runs (to Minnie Miñoso and Jack Harshman) and five more earned runs in 1 2/3 innings in a 29–6 rout. It was his last MLB appearance of 1955.

After a successful 1956 campaign with the Triple-A Columbus Jets, Spicer returned to the Athletics for a second trial after the rosters expanded in September. In his first outing, September 18, he pitched a scoreless third of an inning in a 6–5 triumph over the Boston Red Sox in Kansas City. Four days later, however, in what would be his final MLB game, facing the White Sox at Comiskey Park, Spicer was roughed up again for five earned runs in another one-sided Chicago win, 17–3. All told, he gave up 15 hits and 15 earned runs in five innings of work, with two strikeouts and five bases on balls.

Spicer resumed his minor league career in 1957, eventually winning 166 games through 1961. A good-hitting pitcher, he spent some time in the outfield between pitching assignments, and batted .244 lifetime.
