= Hal Marnie =

American baseball player (1918–2002)

- Infielder
- Born: July 6, 1918; Philadelphia, Pennsylvania, U.S.
- Died: January 7, 2002 (aged 83); Philadelphia, Pennsylvania, U.S.
- Batted: Right Threw: Right

MLB debut
- September 15, 1940, for the Philadelphia Phillies

Last MLB appearance
- September 25, 1942, for the Philadelphia Phillies

MLB statistics
- Batting average: .221
- Home runs: 0
- Runs batted in: 15
- Stats at Baseball Reference

Teams
- Philadelphia Phillies (1940–1942)

Harry Sylvester "Hal" Marnie (July 6, 1918 – January 7, 2002) was an American professional baseball player. Born in Philadelphia, he was a second baseman and shortstop who appeared in 96 games in Major League Baseball over parts of three seasons (1940–1942) for the Philadelphia Phillies. He threw and batted right-handed and was listed as 6 feet 1 inch (1.85 m) tall and 178 pounds (81 kg).

Marnie's career lasted from 1937 through 1946, with three seasons (1943–1945) missed due to United States Army service in World War II. He batted .221 in 222 major-league at bats; his 49 hits included three doubles and three triples.
