= Charlie Osgood =

American baseball player (1926–2014)

- Pitcher
- Born: November 23, 1926; Somerville, Massachusetts, U.S.
- Died: January 23, 2014 (aged 87); Tewksbury, Massachusetts, U.S.
- Batted: Right Threw: Right

MLB debut
- June 18, 1944, for the Brooklyn Dodgers

Last MLB appearance
- June 18, 1944, for the Brooklyn Dodgers

MLB statistics
- Win–loss record: 0–0
- Earned run average: 3.00
- Strikeouts: 0
- Stats at Baseball Reference

Teams
- Brooklyn Dodgers (1944)

Charles Benjamin Osgood (November 23, 1926 – January 23, 2014) was an American Major League Baseball pitcher who appeared in one game for the Brooklyn Dodgers in 1944. At 17 years of age, the 5 ft 10 in (1.78 m), 180 lb (82 kg) rookie was the fifth-youngest player to appear in a National League game that season.

Osgood was one of many ballplayers who only appeared in the major leagues during World War II. His only major league action came on June 18, 1944 in a road doubleheader against the Philadelphia Blue Jays at Shibe Park. He pitched three innings of relief in one of the games, allowing six baserunners but only one earned run.

On November 7, 1944, Osgood was drafted by the Chicago Cubs from the Dodgers in the 1944 minor league draft, but he never again made it to the major league level. His career ended with a 0–0 record and a 3.00 ERA.
