= Smithfield-Selma Leafs =

Smithfield–Selma Leafs
- 1946–1950; Smithfield, North Carolina

Minor league affiliations
- Class: Class D (1946–1950)
- League: Tobacco State League (1946–1950)

Major league affiliations
- Team: None

Minor league titles
- League titles (0): None
- Wild card berths (2): 1946; 1948

Team data
- Name: Smithfield–Selma Leafs (1946–1950)
- Ballpark: Legion Park (1946–1950)

The Smithfield–Selma Leafs were a minor league baseball team based in Smithfield, North Carolina, in partnership with Selma, North Carolina. From 1946 to 1950, the Smithfield–Selma Leafs teams played exclusively as members of the Class D level Tobacco State League and hosted home games Legion Park in Smithfield.

== History ==
Smithfield, North Carolina first hosted minor league play in 1946, with the team playing in partnership with neighboring Selma, North Carolina. The "Smithfield–Selma Leafs" became charter members of the six–team Class D level Tobacco State League. The Angier–Fuquay Springs Bulls, Clinton Blues, Dunn–Erwin Twins, Sanford Spinners and Wilmington Pirates teams joined Smithfield–Selma as charter members in Tobacco State League play.

In their first season of minor league play, the 1946 Smithfield–Selma Leafs qualified for the playoffs. The Leafs ended the season with a record of 58–62 to place third in the six–team Tobacco State League regular season standings. Playing under manager Mike Balas, the Leafs finished the 1946 Tobacco State League regular season 13.5 games behind the first place Sanford Spinners. In the first round of the playoffs, Smithfield–Selma lost to the Clinton Blues 4 games to 1. The playoffs were eventually won by the Angier-Fuquay Springs Bulls.

In 1947, H.G. Johnson was reported to be president of the Smithfield–Selma Leafs, with J. W. Best serving as vice–president and Peggy Johnson serving as business manager.

Continuing Tobacco State League play, the 1947 Smithfield–Selma Leafs finished last in the league standings. Smithfield–Selma finished in eighth place and did not qualify for the playoffs as the league expanded to eight teams. Playing under managers Micke Balas and Joe Eonta in the eight–team league, Smithfield–Selma ended the regular season with a 46–79 record. The Leafs finished 40.0 games behind the first place Sanford Spinners in the regular season standings. In the playoffs, the Sanford Spinners became the league champions.

In 1948, the Smithfield–Selma Leafs qualified for the Tobacco State League playoffs. The Leafs ended the regular season in fourth place with a 73–65 record, playing under managers Sam Narron and Virgil Payne. The Leafs finished 8.0 games behind the 1st placed Sanford Spinners in the final Tobacco State League regular season standings. Leaf pitcher Aaron Osofsky led the Tobacco State League with 24 wins and a 24–5 season record. In the first round of the playoffs, the Leafs were defeated by the Sanford Spinners 4 games to 1. The Red Springs Red Robins then defeated Sanford in the Finals to win the championship.

The 1949 Smithfield–Selma Leafs placed 5th in the eight–team Tobacco State League and did not qualify for the playoffs. Smithfield–Selma ended the regular season with a record of 70–65, playing under managers Virgil Payne, Claude Weaver and Paul Kluk. The Leafs finished 11.0 games behind of the first place Dunn-Erwin Twins in the regular season standings. Smithfield–Selma did not qualify for the playoffs, won by the Red Springs Red Robins.

In their final season, the 1950 Smithfield–Selma Leafs folded during the season, which was also the final one for the Tobacco State League. On August 16, 1950, the franchise permanently folded. At the time the Leafs folded, the team had a 49–62 record, playing under manager Marvin Lorenz. The Tobacco State continued the season with seven teams after the Leafs folded. The final playoffs were won by the Rockingham Eagles. The Tobacco State League permanently folded following the 1950 season.

Smithfield, North Carolina has not hosted another minor league team.

== The ballpark ==
The Smithfield–Selma Leafs minor league teams were noted to have played home games at Legion Park. The ballpark was reportedly located at Buffalo Street & 7th Street, Smithfield, North Carolina.

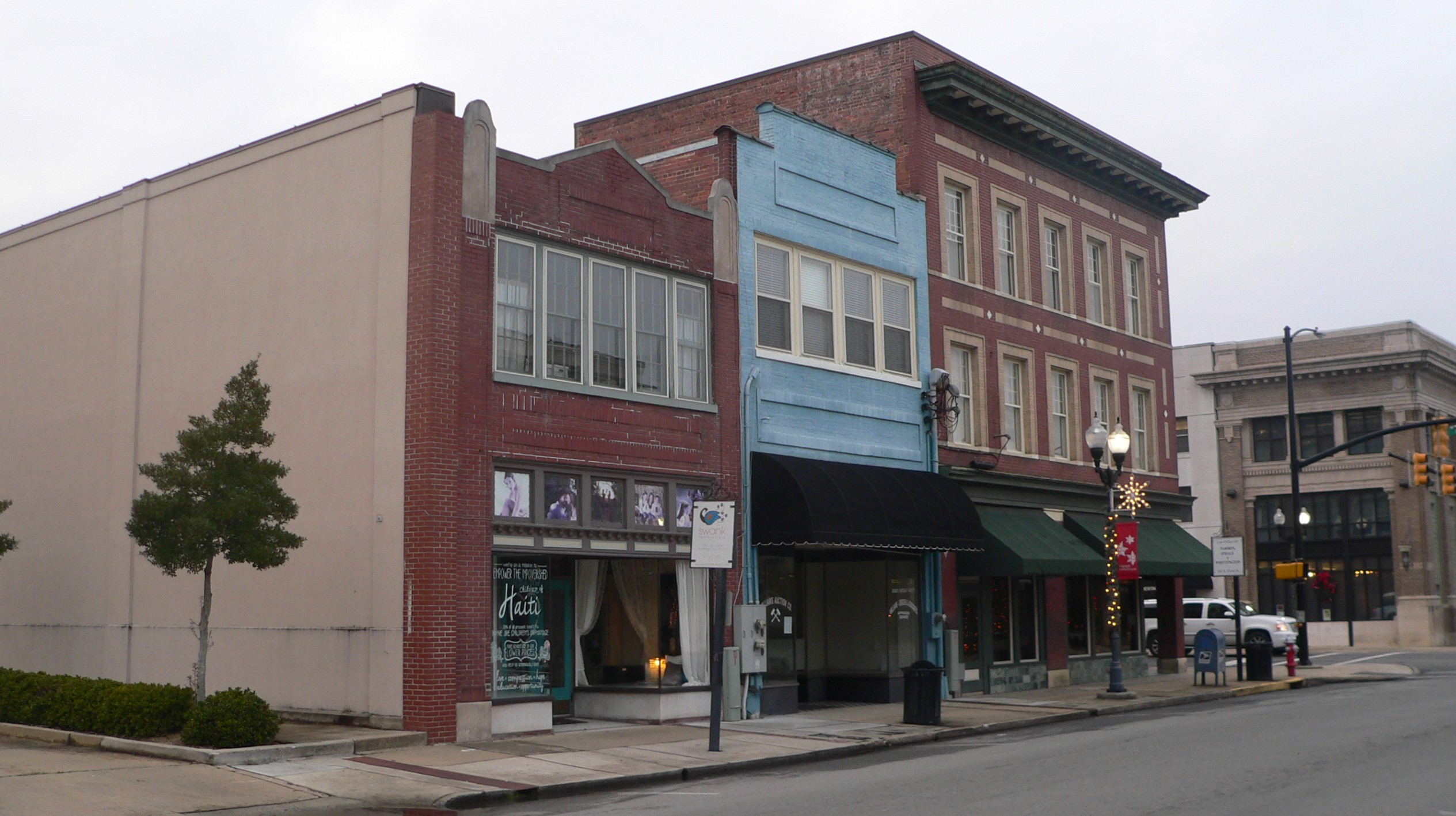
(2014) 3rd Street & Market Street. National Register of Historic Places. Smithfield, North Carolina

== Timeline ==
| Year(s) | # Yrs. | Team | Level | League | Affiliate | Ballpark |
|---|---|---|---|---|---|---|
| 1946–1950 | 5 | Smithfield–Selma Leafs | Class D | Tobacco State League | None | Legion Park |

== Year–by–year records ==
| Year | Record | Finish | Manager | Playoffs/Notes |
|---|---|---|---|---|
| 1946 | 58–62 | 3rd | Michael Balas | Lost in 1st round |
| 1947 | 46–79 | 8th | Michael Balas / Joe Eonta | Did not qualify |
| 1948 | 73–65 | 4th | Sam Narron / Virgil Payne | Lost in 1st round |
| 1949 | 70–65 | 5th | Virgil Payne / Claude Weaver / Paul Kluk | Did not qualify |
| 1950 | 49–62 | NA | Marvin Lorenz | Team folded August 16 |

== Notable alumni ==
- Mike Balas (1946–1947, MGR)
- Sam Narron (1947), (1948, MGR)
