= Turkey Tyson =

American baseball player

- Pinch hitter
- Born: December 6, 1914; Elm City, North Carolina, U.S.
- Died: February 17, 2000 (aged 85); Elm City, North Carolina, U.S.
- Batted: Left Threw: Right

MLB debut
- April 23, 1944, for the Philadelphia Phillies

Last MLB appearance
- April 23, 1944, for the Philadelphia Phillies

MLB statistics
- Games played: 1
- At bats: 1
- Hits: 0
- Stats at Baseball Reference

Teams
- Philadelphia Phillies (1944)

Cecil Washington "Turkey" Tyson (December 6, 1914 – February 17, 2000), nicknamed "Slim", was an American Major League Baseball player.

Tyson is one of many ballplayers who only appeared in the major leagues during World War II. His MLB career consisted of one at bat as a pinch hitter for the Philadelphia Phillies at Braves Field on April 23, 1944. He went 0-for-1 for a batting average of .000. Tyson did not appear in the field. The 29-year-old rookie stood 6'5" and weighed 225 lbs.

He played 15 seasons in the minor leagues, beginning with the Tallahassee Capitals of the Georgia-Florida League and the Greenwood Dodgers of the Cotton States League in 1938. His best minor league season was in 1940, when he had a batting average of .363 with 5 home runs for two separate teams. His last minor league season was in 1952 with the Rocky Mount Leafs of the Coastal Plain League. He was a first baseman and outfielder.

He died in his hometown of Elm City, North Carolina, at the age of 85.
