= Wilmington Pirates =

Baseball team in North Carolina

The Wilmington Pirates were a minor league baseball team located in Wilmington, North Carolina. From 1928 to 1929, they played in the Class D Eastern Carolina League. From 1932 to 1935, they played in the Class B Piedmont League. From 1946 to 1950, they played in the Class D Tobacco State League.

== Year-by-year record ==
Year	Record	Finish	Manager	Playoffs
1928	68-46	1st	Hal Weafer	lost league finals
1929	67-52	3rd	Hal Weafer	lost league finals
1932	62-77	5th	Charles Walsh / Hal Weafer	
1933	70-68	4th	Blackie Carter	none
1934	64-74	3rd	Harry McCurdy / Blackie Carter	
1935			Harry McCurdy	
1946	52-66	5th	John Wilbourne / Gus Brittain / Mickey Katkaveck	
1947	68-57	3rd	James Staton / Nate Andrews	lost in 1st round
1948	76-62	2nd	James Staton	lost in 1st round
1949	49-88	8th	Ab Tiedemann / Gus Brittain / Hargrove Davis / Johnie Edens	
1950	56-75	6th	Red Teague / Lowell Hamons / Steve Collins	
