= Coastal Plain League (Class D) =

- Classification: Class D (1937–1941, 1946–1952)
- Sport: Minor League Baseball
- First season: 1937
- Folded: 1952
- President: J. Bruce Eure (1937–1939); Ray Goodmon (1939–1941, 1946–1952)
- No. of teams: 13
- Country: United States of America
- Most titles: 3 New Bern Bears
- Related competitions: Coastal Plain League

The Coastal Plain League was a Minor league baseball affiliated circuit which, except for the war years (1942–1945), operated in North Carolina between 1937 and 1952. It was classified as a "D" league. It grew out of a semi-pro league that operated from 1935 to 1936 under the same Coastal Plain League name. Today, the summer collegiate baseball league has revived the Coastal Plain League name.

== Cities represented ==
- Ayden, NC: Ayden Aces (1937–1938)
- Edenton, NC: Edenton Colonials (1952)
- Fayetteville, NC: Fayetteville Cubs (1946)
- Goldsboro, NC: Goldsboro Goldbugs (1937–1941,1946–1949); Goldsboro Cardinals (1950–1951); Goldsboro Jets (1952)
- Greenville, NC: Greenville Greenies (1937–1941,1946–49); Greenville Robins (1950–1951)
- Kinston, NC: Kinston Eagles (1937–1941, 1946–1952)
- New Bern, NC: New Bern Bears (1937–1941, 1946–1952)
- Roanoke Rapids, NC: Roanoke Rapids Blue Jays (1947); Roanoke Rapids Jays (1948–1952)
- Rocky Mount, NC: Rocky Mount Leafs (1941); Rocky Mount Rocks (1946); Rocky Mount Leafs (1947–1952)
- Snow Hill, NC: Snow Hill Billies (1937–1940)
- Tarboro, NC: Tarboro Combs (1937); Tarboro Serpents (1938–1939)†; Tarboro Tars (1940); Tarboro Orioles (1941); Tarboro Tars (1946–1948); Tarboro Athletics (1949); Tarboro Tars (1950); Tarboro A's (1951); Tarboro Tars (1952)
- Williamston, NC: Williamston Martins (1937–1941)
- Wilson, NC: Wilson Tobs (1939–1941, 1946–1952)

† Tarboro was also known as the Goobers in 1939

== Coastal Plain League Champions ==
- 1937 – Snow Hill
- 1938 – New Bern
- 1939 – Williamston
- 1940 – Tarboro
- 1941 – Wilson
- 1946 – Rocky Mount
- 1947 – Kinston
- 1948 – Tarboro
- 1949 – Greenville
- 1950 – New Bern
- 1951 – New Bern
- 1952 – Edenton

== Standings & statistics ==
=== 1937 to 1941 ===
1937 Coastal Plain League
schedule

Team standings	W	L	PCT	GB	Managers
Snow Hill Billies	62	36	.633	-	Dwight Wall / Peahead Walker
Williamston Martins	55	41	.573	6	Arthur Hauger
Tarboro Serpents	53	42	.558	7½	Snake Henry
New Bern Bears	48	45	.516	11½	Doc Smith
Ayden Aces	47	46	.505	12½	Nick Harrison / Monk Joyner
Goldsboro Goldbugs	47	51	.480	15	Clarence Roper
Greenville Greenies	40	58	.408	22	Bo Farley
Kinston Eagles	32	65	.330	29½	Krim Bess / Vern Taylor

Playoff: Snow Hill 3 games, New Bern 1; Tarboro 3 games, Williamston 1.
Finals: Snow Hill 4 games, Tarboro 1.

Player statistics
Player	Team	Stat	Tot	Player	Team	Stat	Tot
Monk Joyner	Ayden	BA	.380	Owen Elliott	Goldsboro	W	18
Dwight Wall	Snow Hill	Runs	88	James Rollins	Williamston	SO	202
Monk Joyner	Ayden	Hits	136	Emil Zak	Snow Hill	Pct	.842; 16–3
Monk Joyner	Ayden	RBI	97				
Monk Joyner	Ayden	HR	24				
Joe Bistroff	Snow Hill	HR	24				

1938 Coastal Plain League

Team standings	W	L	PCT	GB	Managers
New Bern Bears	63	49	.563	-	Doc Smith
Tarboro Serpents	60	47	.561	½	Snake Henry
Snow Hill Billies	61	49	.555	1	Peahead Walker
Kinston Eagles	60	50	.545	2	Tommy West
Williamston Martins	56	56	.500	7	Arthur Hauger
Goldsboro Goldbugs	47	65	.420	16	Clarence Roper / Mule Shirley
Greenville Greenies	45	68	.398	18½	Monk Joyner / Rube Wilson
Ayden Aces	38	76	.333	26	Frank Sidle / Bill Herring / Frank Rodgers

Playoff: New Bern 4 games, Kinston 0; Snow Hill 4 games, Tarboro 2.
Finals: New Bern 4 games, Snow Hill 0.

Player statistics
Player	Team	Stat	Tot	Player	Team	Stat	Tot
Doyt Morris	Ayden	BA	.377	Jim Mooney	Tarboro	W	19
Alf Anderson	New Bern	Runs	101	Cliff Wentz	Kinston	SO	179
Johnny Wyrostek	Kinston	Hits	149	Eddie Hurley	Kinston	Pct	.750; 15–5
Bill F. Harper	New Bern	RBI	84				
Les Burge	New Bern	HR	22				

1939 Coastal Plain League

Team standings	W	L	PCT	GB	Managers
Greenville Greenies	74	48	.607	-	Rube Wilson
Goldsboro Goldbugs	69	53	.566	5	Mule Shirley
Williamston Martins	65	57	.533	9	Paul O'Malley
Kinston Eagles	65	59	.524	10	Snake Henry / Ray Lucas / Bill Herring
New Bern Bears	62	59	.512	11½	Doc Smith
Wilson Tobs	64	61	.512	11½	Frank Rodgers
Snow Hill Billies	56	64	.467	17	Peahead Walker
Tarboro Tars	36	90	.286	40	Guy Schatzer / Fred Neisler / Larry Merville

Playoff: Kinston 4 games, Greenville 2; Williamston 4 games, Goldsboro 1.
Finals: Williamston 4 games, Kinston 1.

Player statistics
Player	Team	Stat	Tot	Player	Team	Stat	Tot
Uriah Norwood	New Bern	BA	.336	Bill Herring	Kinston	W	22
Claude Capps	Goldsboro	Runs	99	Don King	Greenville	ERA	1.25
Ed Black	Greenville	Hits	151	Harry Swain	Williamston	SO	186
Harry Soufas	Snow Hill	Hits	151	Joe Bistroff	Snow Hill	RBI	108
Charles Whitaker	Snow Hill	Hits	151	Joe Bistroff	Snow Hill	HR	32

1940 Coastal Plain League
schedule

Team standings	W	L	PCT	GB	Managers
Wilson Tobs	77	49	.611	-	Frank Rodgers
Tarboro Tars	72	51	.585	3½	Arthur McHenry / Bill Steinecke / Wes Ratteree
Goldsboro Goldbugs	66	58	.532	10	Mack Arnette
Kinston Eagles	63	60	.516	12½	Denny Sothern / Sid Stringfellow / William Averette
Snow Hill Billies	62	64	.492	15	Dwight Wall
New Bern Bears	58	67	.464	18½	Guy Shatzer / Gene McCarty / Marv Farrell / Danny Sothern
Greenville Greenies	53	71	.427	23	Rube Wilson
Williamston Martins	47	78	.376	29½	Dixie Parker / Harry Swain

Playoff: Kinston 4 games, Wilson 3; Tarboro 4 games, Goldsboro 1.
Finals: Tarboro 4 games, Kinston 2.

Player statistics
Player	Team	Stat	Tot	Player	Team	Stat	Tot
Earl Carnahan	Wilson	BA	.354	Walter Wilson	Goldsboro	W	21
Charles Metelski	Tarboro	Runs	115	Harry Swain	Williamston	SO	215
Doyt Morris	Wilson	Hits	185	Bill Zinser	Kinston	ERA	2.08
Earl Carnahan	Wilson	RBI	119	Luis Olmo	Wilson	HR	18

1941 Coastal Plain League

Team standings	W	L	PCT	GB	Managers
Wilson Tobs	87	30	.744	-	Bill Herring
Greenville Greenies	64	54	.542	23½	Rube Wilson
New Bern Bears	61	57	.517	26½	Doc Smith / Jake Wade
Rocky Mount Leafs	59	59	.500	28½	Norm McCaskill / Gus Brittain
Goldsboro Goldbugs	58	61	.487	30	Mack Arnette / Dave McKinney
Williamston Martins	56	61	.479	31	Frank Rodgers
Tarboro Orioles	44	72	.379	42½	Poke Whalen
Kinston Eagles	42	77	.353	46	Arthur McHenry / Joe DeMasi

Playoff: Wilson 4 games, Rocky Mount 1; Greenville 4 games, New Bern 2.
Finals: Wilson 4 games, Greenville 2.

Player statistics
Player	Team	Stat	Tot	Player	Team	Stat	Tot
Earl Carnahan	Wilson	BA	.370	Bill Webb	Wilson	W	23
Erv Dickens	Wilson	Runs	114	Julio Acosta	Goldsboro	SO	199
Earl Carnahan	Wilson	Hits	176	Joe Talley	Wilson	ERA	1.93
Lyle Thompson	New Bern	RBI	111	Fred Eason	Wilson	HR	18

The league did not play From 1942 thru 1945 due to World War II

=== 1946 to 1952 ===
1946 Coastal Plain League
schedule

Team standings	W	L	PCT	GB	Attend	Managers
Rocky Mount Rocks	74	51	.592	-	104,218	Harry Soufas
Kinston Eagles	67	56	.545	6	54,120	Frank Rodgers
Wilson Tobs	67	57	.540	6½	108,229	Irv Dickens
Goldsboro Goldbugs	64	60	.516	9½	92,123	Bill Herring
Tarboro Tars	61	65	.484	13½	46,679	Michael Kardish / Bull Hamons
Greenville Greenies	58	67	.464	16	62,359	Horace Payne
New Bern Bears	57	68	.456	17	90,485	Abe White
Fayetteville Cubs	51	75	.405	23½	77,007	John Intlekofer / Don Anderson

Playoff: Rocky Mount 4 games, Goldsboro 1; Kinston 4 games, Wilson 3.
Finals: Rocky Mount 4 games, Kinston 2.

Player statistics
Player	Team	Stat	Tot	Player	Team	Stat	Tot
Vern Shetler	New Bern	BA	.362	Bill Kennedy	Rocky Mount	W	28
John Wolfe	Wilson	Runs	123	Bill Kennedy	Rocky Mount	SO	456
Ray Carlson	Greenville	Hits	158	Bill Kennedy	Rocky Mount	ERA	1.03
Verne Blackwell	Greenville	RBI	114	Charles Munday	Rocky Mount	HR	21

1947 Coastal Plain League
schedule

Team standings	W	L	PCT	GB	Attend	Managers
Wilson Tobs	79	61	.564	-	138,548	Max Wilson
Kinston Eagles	74	65	.532	4½	68,986	Steve Collins
Tarboro Tars	74	66	.529	5	75,281	Bull Hamons
New Bern Bears	73	66	.525	5½	104,426	Jake Daniel / Harry Soufas / Tom Murray / Worlise Knowles
Goldsboro Goldbugs	72	67	.518	6½	88,607	Bill Herring
Rocky Mount Leafs	68	71	.489	10½	100,794	Charlie Mundy
Roanoke Rapids Blue Jays	60	80	.429	19	115,837	Stu Martin
Greenville Greenies	58	82	.414	21	66,316	Johnny Pare / Larry Baldwin / Ordie Timm

Playoff: Wilson 4 games, New Bern 1; Kinston 4 games, Tarboro 2.
Finals: Kinston 4 games, Wilson 2.

Player statistics
Player	Team	Stat	Tot	Player	Team	Stat	Tot
LeRoy Kennedy	Tarboro	BA	.381	Eddie Neville	Tarboro	W	28
Sal Zunno	New Bern	Runs	133	Sam McLawhorne	Kinston	SO	238
Herb May	Rocky Mount	Hits	190	Bill Herring	Goldsboro	ERA	1.79
Harry Soufas	New Bern	RBI	122	Harry Soufas	New Bern	HR	25

1948 Coastal Plain League
schedule

Team standings	W	L	PCT	GB	Attend	Managers
Tarboro Tars	87	53	.621	-	67,767	Bull Hamons
Kinston Eagles	80	59	.576	6½	76,770	Steve Collins
Goldsboro Goldbugs	79	61	.564	8	81,499	Bill Herring
Rocky Mount Leafs	78	61	.561	8½	94,811	Turkey Tyson
New Bern Bears	69	70	.496	17½	69,548	Harry Soufas / Tal Abernathy / Winston Palmer
Wilson Tobs	61	79	.436	26	95,238	Max Wilson / Irv Dickens / Bob Latshaw
Roanoke Rapids Jays	54	86	.386	33	87,187	Stu Martin
Greenville Greenies	50	89	.360	36½	60,938	Bill Phebus / Bob Cohen / Kelly Kee

Playoff: Tarboro 4 games, Rocky Mount 2; Kinston 4 games, Goldsboro 3.
Finals: Tarboro 4 games, Kinston 1.

Player statistics
Player	Team	Stat	Tot	Player	Team	Stat	Tot
Valentine Gonzalez	Roanoke Rapids	BA	.383	Red Benton	Rocky Mount	W	28
Grover Fowler	Rocky Mount	Runs	138	Harry Helmer	Rocky Mount	SO	268
Quentin Martin	Rocky Mount	Hits	207	Bill Herring	Goldsboro	ERA	2.60
Ray Komanecky	Tarboro	RBI	137	John Hanley	Rocky Mount	HR	35

1949 Coastal Plain League
schedule

Team standings	W	L	PCT	GB	Attend	Managers
Rocky Mount Leafs	79	60	.568	-	80,786	Quentin Martin / Red Benton
Kinston Eagles	74	64	.536	½	88,814	Steve Collins
New Bern Bears	73	66	.525	6	72,291	Bull Hamons
Greenville Greenies	71	67	.514	7½	72,420	Fred Williams
Goldsboro Goldbugs	68	68	.500	9½	71,690	Steve Mizerak / Max Wilson
Tarboro Athletics	68	68	.500	9½	41,212	Joe Antolick
Roanoke Rapids Jays	60	78	.435	18½	68,247	Russ Meers / Glen Lockamy
Wilson Tobs	57	79	.419	20½	71,413	Ross Morrow

Playoff: Greenville 4 games, Rocky Mount 2; Kinston 4 games, New Bern 2.
Finals: Greensville 4 games, Kinston 2.

Player statistics
Player	Team	Stat	Tot	Player	Team	Stat	Tot
Clyde Whitener	Goldsboro	BA	.355	Bill Padgett	New Bern	W	22
John Tepedino	Greenville	Runs	132	Robert Mangum	Goldsboro	SO	248
Clyde Whitener	Goldsboro	Hits	194	Vincent Gohl	Tarboro	ERA	1.27
Fred Williams	Greenville	RBI	122	Quentin Martin	Rocky Mount	HR	27

1950 Coastal Plain League
schedule

Team standings	W	L	PCT	GB	Attend	Managers
Roanoke Rapids Jays	80	58	.580	-	80,665	Glen Lockamy / Walt McJunkin
Rocky Mount Leafs	73	65	.525	7	62,027	Red Benton
New Bern Bears	71	67	.514	9	63,486	Harry Land
Kinston Eagles	70	68	.507	10	51,794	Walter Millies
Wilson Tobs	68	70	.493	12	84,159	Bill Herring
Greenville Robins	67	70	.489	12½	49,140	Randy Heflin
Tarboro Athletics	67	71	.486	13	36,467	Joe Antolick
Goldsboro Cardinals	56	83	.403	24½	35,719	James Herbison

Playoff: Kinston 4 games, Roanoke Rapids 0; New Bern 4 games, Rocky Mount 2.
Finals: New Bern 4 games, Kinston 0.

Player statistics
Player	Team	Stat	Tot	Player	Team	Stat	Tot
Quentin Martin	Rocky Mount	BA	.351	Alton Brown	Roanoke Rapids	W	28
Dallas Orf	Tarboro	Runs	110	Alton Brown	Roanoke Rapids	SO	204
Quentin Martin	Rocky Mount	Hits	171	Leo Groeschen	Kinston	ERA	1.74
Warriner Bass	Roanoke Rapids	RBI	148	Paul Smith	Goldsboro	HR	24

1951 Coastal Plain League
schedule

Team standings	W	L	PCT	GB	Attend	Managers
Kinston Eagles	79	47	.627	-	41,516	Wes Livengood
New Bern Bears	72	54	.571	7	45,388	Harry Land
Goldsboro Cardinals	70	55	.550	8½	36,529	George Ferrell
Wilson Tobs	69	57	.548	10	54,753	Joe Antolick / Alfred Rehm
Roanoke Rapids Jays	59	66	.472	19½	34,132	Morrie Aderholt
Rocky Mount Leafs	39	86	.312	39½	27,753	Jim Mills / Bull Hamons / Red Benton
Tarboro Athletics	13	22	.371	NA	6,431	Joe Rullo
Greenville Robins	10	24	.294	NA	5,932	John Streza

Tarboro and Greensville disbanded June 6.
Playoff: Wilson 4 games, Kinston 2; New Bern 4 games, Goldsboro 2.
Finals: New Bern 4 games, Wilson 3.

Player statistics
Player	Team	Stat	Tot	Player	Team	Stat	Tot
Kite Thomas	Goldsboro	BA	.343	Alexander Zych	Kinston	W	22
Bob Horan	Kinston	Runs	109	Robert Slaybaugh	Goldsboro	SO	223
Kite Thomas	Goldsboro	Hits	175	Bunky Stewart	New Bern	ERA	1.16
Jim McComas	Wilson	RBI	95	Jim McComas	Wilson	HR	20

1952 Coastal Plain League
schedule

Team standings	W	L	PCT	GB	Attend	Managers
Kinston Eagles	76	47	.608	-	43,301	Wayne Blackburn
Wilson Tobs	71	51	.582	4½	57,565	Jake McComas / Alfred Rehm
Edenton Colonials	69	55	.557	7½	24,420	Vernon Mustian / Tom Ingel / Gashouse Parker
Goldsboro Jets	63	59	.516	12½	35,365	Wes Livengood
Roanoke Rapids Jays	63	61	.508	13½	36,830	Pete Appleton
Rocky Mount Leafs	59	63	.484	16½	40,629	Paul Badgett / Quentin Martin / Turkey Tyson / Tommy Warren
Tarboro Tars	49	71	.408	25½	28,439	Bill Long
New Bern Bears	40	83	.325	36	29,056	Con Dempsey / John Pavlich / Steve Collins

Playoff: Goldsboro 4 games, Kinston 3; Edenton 4 games, Wilson 0.
Finals: Edenton 4 games, Goldsboro 1.

Player statistics
Player	Team	Stat	Tot	Player	Team	Stat	Tot
Tom Leonard	Goldsboro	BA	.375	Gene Host	Kinston	W	26
Cecil Fogleman	Tarboro	Runs	101	John Raines	Edenton	W	26
Bill Wollet	Roanoke Rapids	Hits	151	Ted Abernathy	Roanoke Rapids	SO	293
Sam Stell	Tarboro	RBI	77	Rodney Heath	Rocky Mount	ERA	1.27
Wade Martin	Rocky Mount	HR	11	John Perry	Goldsboro	SHo	10
