= New Bern Bears =

- 1937–1952; (1937–1941, 1946–1952); New Bern, North Carolina

Minor league affiliations
- Class: Class D (1937–1941, 1946–1952)
- League: Coastal Plain League (1937–1941, 1946–1952)

Major league affiliations
- Team: None

Minor league titles
- League titles (3): 1938; 1950; 1951
- Conference titles (1): 1938
- Wild card berths (6): 1937; 1941; 1947; 1949; 1950; 1951

Team data
- Name: New Bern Bears (1937–1941, 1946–1952)
- Ballpark: Kafer Park (1937–1941, 1946–1952)

The New Bern Bears were a minor league baseball team based in New Bern, North Carolina. Between 1937 and 1952, with a break during World War II, the Bears teams played exclusively as members of the Coastal Plain League, winning three league championships with six playoff appearances. New Bern hosted minor league home games at Kafer Park.

== History ==
The New Bern Bears were preceded in minor league baseball by the 1908 "New Bern" team, who played briefly as members of the Eastern Carolina League before folding during the season.

=== 1937 to 1941: Coastal Plain League ===
The New Bern "Bears" began play in 1937. The Bears would remain for every season of the Class D level Coastal Plain League, winning three championships.

The New Bern use of the "Bears" nickname corresponds to local history. When the city of New Bern was founded in 1710, early settlers adopted the Bear as the city mascot after a bear was the first animal the group encountered. Today, there are more than 50 bear statues throughout the city, with Bear Plaza being a focal point in downtown New Bern.

In 1937, New Bern was joined by the Ayden Aces, Goldsboro Goldbugs, Greenville Greenies, Kinston Eagles, Snow Hill Billies, Tarboro Serpents and Williamston Martins teams as charter franchises in the Coastal State League. The teams began league play on May 6, 1937.

In their first season of Coastal Plain League play, the New Bern Bears ended the regular season with a record of 48–45, placing fourth in the eight–team league standings. Their manager in 1937 was Doc Smith, who led the team to the four–team playoffs. In the first round of the playoffs, the Snow Hill Hill Billies defeated New Bern 3 games to 1 to end their season.

Under returning manager Doc Smith, the New Bern Bears won the 1938 Coastal Plain League championship, their first of three league titles. The Bears ended the regular season with a record of 63–49, winning the league pennant in placing 1st in the Coastal Plain League regular season. In the playoffs, New Bern swept both playoff series in defeating the Kinston Eagles 4 games to 0 in the first round and the Snow Hill Billies 4 games to 0 in the finals.

In 1939, the New Bern Bears missed qualifying for the Coastal Plain League playoffs. With a record of 62–59, New Bern placed fifth in the Coastal Plain League regular season standings, playing under manager Doc Smith.

The 1940 New Bern Bears finished the regular season with a record of 58–67. New Bern placed sixth in the Coastal Plain League standings, playing the season under managers Guy Shatzer and Gene McCarty. The Bears did not qualify for the 1940 Coastal Plain League playoffs.

The New Bern Bears League advanced to the 1941 Coastal Plain League playoffs, before the league was paused during World War II. The Bears finished with a regular season record of 61–57, placing third in the regular season under returning manager Doc Smith and another manager in Jake Wade. In the 1941 Coastal Plain League Playoffs, the Greenville Greenies defeated New Bern 4 games to 2.

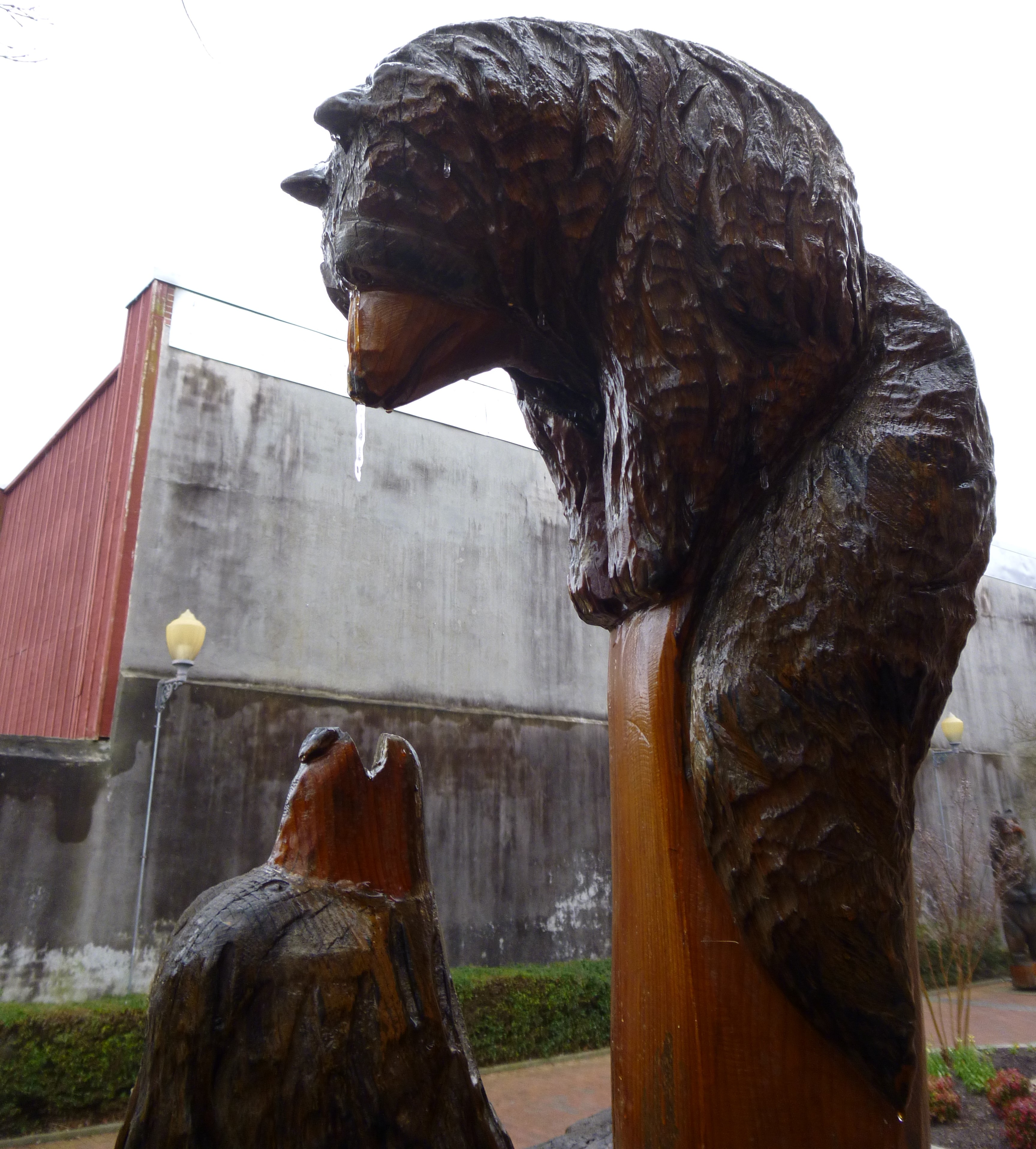
(2013) Bear Plaza in New Bern, North Carolina

=== 1946 to 1952: Coastal Plain League ===
The 1946 New Bern Bears returned to play after the Coastal Plain League was idle in the 1942–1945 seasons due to World War II. The Bears ended the regular season with a 57–86 record, placing seventh in the eight–team league standings and missing the playoffs. The 1946 manager was Abe White.

The New Bern Bears placed fourth in the 1947 Coastal Plain League standings. The Bears' regular season record of 73–66 advanced the team to the Coastal Plain League playoffs, playing under managers Jake Daniel, Harry Soufas, Tom Murray and Worlise Knowles. In the playoffs, the Wilson Tobs defeated New Bern 4 games to 1.

The 1948 New Bern Bears did not qualify for the Coastal Plain League playoffs. The Bears placed fifth and finished the regular season with a 69–70 record. The team was managed by Harry Soufas, Tal Abernathy and Winston Palmer.

The 1949 New Bern Bears returned to the Coastal Plain League playoffs. The Bears finished the regular season with a 73–66 record, placing third in the Coastal Plain League under manager Bull Hamons. In the first round of the 1949 Coastal Plain League playoffs, New Bern was defeated by the Kinston Eagles 4 games 2.

The New Bern Bears won their first of consecutive Coastal Plain League Championships in 1950. With a Coastal Plain League regular season record of 71–67, the Bears placed third in the Coastal Plain League final standings, playing under manager Harry Land. In the playoffs, New Bern defeated the Rocky Mount Leafs 4 games to 2 to advance, before sweeping the Kinston Eagles in 4 games to claim the championship.

New Bern won their second consecutive Coastal Plain League championship in 1951. The Bears ended the regular season in second place, with a 72–54 record, playing the season under returning manager Harry Land. In the playoffs, New Bern defeated the Goldsboro Cardinals 4 games to 2 to advance. In the Finals, the Bears defeated the Wilson Tobs 4 games to 3 to win the league championship.

In the final season of the Coastal Plain League, the 1952 New Bern Bears finished last in the standings. The Bears ended the season in eighth place with a 40–83 record and were managed by Larry Dempsey, John Pavlich and Steve Collins.

The Coastal League permanently folded as a minor league following the 1952 season. New Bern has not hosted another minor league team.

== The ballpark ==
The New Bern Bears hosted minor league home games at Kafer Park. Today, the baseball field is still in use. Kafer Park is located at 603 George Street in New Bern, North Carolina.

== Timeline ==
Year(s)	# Yrs.	Team	Level	League	Ballpark
1937–1941	5	New Bern Bears	Class D	Coastal Plain League	Kafer Park
1946–1952	7	New Bern Bears	Class D	Coastal Plain League	Kafer Park

== Year–by–year records ==
Year	Record	Finish	Manager	Playoffs
1937	48-45	4th	Doc Smith	Lost in 1st round
1938	63-49	1st	Doc Smith	League Champs
1939	62-59	5th	Doc Smith	Did not qualify
1940	58-67	6th	Guy Shatzer / Gene McCarty	Did not qualify
1941	61-57	3rd	Doc Smith / Jake Wade	Lost in 1st round
1946	57-86	7th	Abe White	Did not qualify
1947	73-66	4th	Jake Daniel / Harry Soufas / Tom Murray / Worlise Knowles	Lost in 1st round
1948	69-70	5th	Harry Soufas / Tal Abernathy / Winston Palmer	Did not qualify
1949	73-66	3rd	Bull Hamons	Lost in 1st round
1950	71-67	3rd	Harry Land	League Champs
1951	72-54	2nd	Harry Land	League Champs
1952	40-83	8th	Larry Dempsey / John Pavlich / Steve Collins	Did not qualify

== Notable alumni ==
- Tal Abernathy (1948, MGR)
- Alf Anderson (1938)
- Les Burge (1938)
- Steve Collins (1952, MGR)
- Jake Daniel (1947, MGR), (1949)
- Al Evans (1937)
- Stu Flythe (1937)
- Ken Guettler (1946)
- Phil McCullough (1939)
- Bunky Stewart (1951)
- Ben Wade (1940)
- Jake Wade (1941, MGR)
- Abe White (1946, MGR)

== See also ==
- New Bern Bears players
