= Ayden Aces =

- 1937–1938; Ayden, North Carolina

Minor league affiliations
- Class: Class D (1937–1938)
- League: Coastal Plain League (1937–1938)

Major league affiliations
- Team: None

Minor league titles
- League titles (0): None

Team data
- Name: Ayden Aces (1937–1938)
- Ballpark: Ayden High School Park (1937–1938)

The Ayden Aces were a minor league baseball team based in Ayden, North Carolina. In 1937 and 1938, the Aces played as exclusively as members of the Class D level Coastal Plain League, hosting home games at the Ayden High School Park.

== History ==
The Ayden "Aces" moniker was first used by a semi–pro team that played in a league named the Coastal Plain League prior to minor league play.

Minor league baseball began in Ayden, North Carolina in 1937 when the Ayden "Aces" became charter members of the eight–team Class D level Coastal Plain League. Ayden joined the Goldsboro Goldbugs, Greenville Greenies, Kinston Eagles, New Bern Bears, Snow Hill Billies, Tarboro Combs and Williamston Martins in playing the first season of Class D level baseball for the league.

Beginning Coastal Plain League play on May 6, 1937, the Ayden Aces finished the regular season in fifth place. The Aces ended the season with a record of 47–46, finishing in fifth place in the eight–team Coastal Plain League, failing to qualify for the four-team league playoffs. The Ayden managers in 1937 were Nick Harrison and Alfred "Monk" Joyner, as the Ayden finished the regular season 12½ games behind the first place Snow Hill Billies in the final standings. The Aces did not qualify for the playoffs, won by Snow Hill. Ayden player/manager Monk Joyner won the league Triple Crown, leading the Coastal Plain League with a .380 batting average, and adding 24 home runs and 97 RBI in his notable season.

In their final season of play, the Ayden Aces finished last in the 1938 eight–team Coastal Plain League standings. Playing the season under managers Frank Sidle, Bill Herring, Jim Tatum and Frank Rodgers, the Aces finished the 1938 season with a record of 38–76. Placing eighth in the Coastal Plain League, the Aces finished 26.0 games behind the first place New Bern Bears in the final standings and did not qualify for the playoffs. The Ayden minor league franchise permanently folded following the 1938 season. Aces player Doyt Morris won the Coastal Plain league batting championship, leading the league in batting average, hitting .377.

The Aces were replaced by the Wilson Tobs franchise in the 1939 Coastal Plain League. Ayden, North Carolina has not hosted another minor league team.

== The ballpark ==
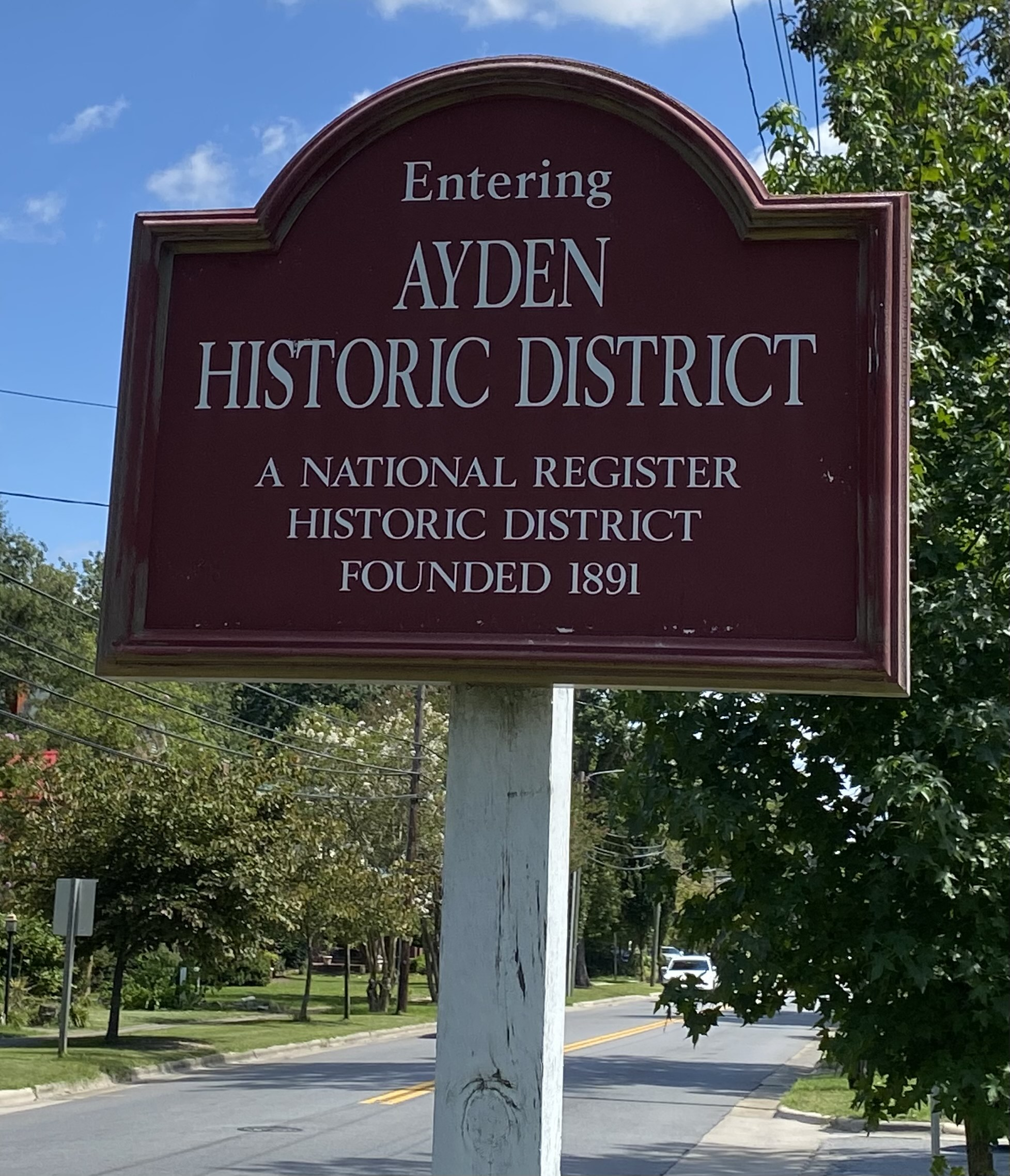
(2021) Ayden Historic District marker, Ayden, North Carolina.

The Ayden Aces teams were noted to have hosted home minor league games at the Ayden High School Park. Today, the ballpark is still in use by the Ayden-Grifton High School teams.

== Timeline ==
Year(s)	# Yrs.	Team	Level	League	Ballpark
1937–1938	2	Ayden Aces	Class D	Coastal Plain League	Ayden High School Park

== Year–by–year records ==
Year	Record	Finish	Manager	Playoffs/Notes
1937	47–46	5th	Nick Harrison / Alfred Joyner	Did not qualify
1938	38–76	8th	Frank Sidle / Bill Herring / Jim Tatum / Frank Rodgers	Did not qualify

== Notable alumni ==
- Bill Herring (1938, MGR)
- Doyt Morris (1938)

== See also ==
- Ayden Aces players
