= Snow Hill Billies =

- 1937–1940; Snow Hill, North Carolina

Minor league affiliations
- Class: Class D (1937–1940)
- League: Coastal Plain League (1937–1940)

Major league affiliations
- Team: None

Minor league titles
- League titles (1): 1937
- Wild card berths (1): 1938

Team data
- Name: Snow Hill Billies (1937–1940)
- Ballpark: Snow Hill Park (1937–1940)

The Snow Hill Billies was a minor league baseball team based in Snow Hill, North Carolina. From 1937 to 1940, the Snow Hill "Billies" played exclusively as members of the Coastal Plain League, winning the 1937 league championship. The Billies played home minor league games at Snow Hill Park.

== History ==
The Snow Hill "Billies" moniker was first used by a semi–pro team that played in a league named the Coastal Plain League prior to minor league play. Bob Bowman was noted to have played for the 1934 team.

Minor league baseball began in Snow Hill, North Carolina in 1937. The 1937 Snow Hill Billies, became charter members of the eight–team Class D level Coastal Plain League. Williamston joined the Ayden Aces, Goldsboro Goldbugs, Greenville Greenies, Kinston Eagles, New Bern Bears, Tarboro Combs and Williamston Martins in playing the first season of Class D level baseball for the league. The league began play on May 6, 1937.

In their first season of Coastal Plain League play, the Snow Hill Billies won the Coastal Plain League championship, playing the season under manager D.C. "Peahead" Walker. Walker would manage the team for three seasons. Snow Hill placed first in the 1937 regular season, as the Billies ended the season with a record of 62–36 in the eight–team Coastal Plain League. The Billies finished 6.0 games ahead of the second place Williamston Martins in the final standings to qualify for the four–team playoffs. In the first round of the playoffs, Snow Hill defeated New Bern 3 games to 1. In the Finals, Snow Hill defeated the Tarboro Combs 4 games to 1 to win the Coastal Plain League championship. Joe Bistroff of Snow Hill led the league with 24 home runs.

Snow Hill manager D.C. "Peahead" Walker was also serving as the Elon College and then the Wake Forest University football coach during the three seasons he managed the team.

Continuing minor league play, the 1938 Snow Hill Billies placed third in the eight–team Coastal Plain League standings and reached the playoff finals. Playing under returning manager D.C. Walker, the Billies finished the 1938 season with a record of 61–49 in Coastal Plain League play. In a close race, Snow Hill finished 1.0 game behind the first place New Bern Bears and 0.5 game behind the second place Tarboro Serpents in the final standings. In the playoffs, Snow Hill defeated Tarboro 4 games to 2 in the first round. In the Finals the New Bern Bears defeated Snow Hill 4 games to 0.

The Snow Hill Billies continued play in the 1939 Coastal Plain League, placing seventh. In the regular season, the Billies ended the regular season with a record of 56–64, playing under manager D.C. Walker, finishing 17.0 games behind the first place Greenville Greenies. Snow Hill did not qualify for the playoffs, won by the Williamston Martins. Joe Bistroff of Snow Hill led the league with both 32 home runs and 108 RBI.

Before the 1940 season, Snow Hill Billies owner Josiah Exum reportedly informed local residents that the franchise was losing money. Exum felt that the installation of lights at Snow Hill Park could help the franchise survive financially. The Snow Hill population of 900 at the time was an attendance factor. A fund-raising drive ensued, and lights were purchased and installed, with Exum informing residents on April 2, 1940, that the team would play in the upcoming season.

In their final season of play, the 1940 Snow Hill Billies placed fifth in the Coastal Carolina League. Snow Hill ended the season of eight–team league with a record of 62–64, playing under manager Dwight Wall. Snow Hill finished 15.0 games behind the first place Wilson Tobs in the final league standings. The Snow Hill franchise folded following the 1940 season, replaced by the Rocky Mount Leafs in the 1941 league play.

After the 1940 season, it was reported that the Hill Billies franchise owner sold the newly installed Snow Hill Park lighting system to Elon College. In March 1941, the team franchise roster and the team bus were sold to investors in Rocky Mount, North Carolina for $2,100.

After the franchise relocated to become the Rocky Mount Leafs in the 1941 Coastal Plain League, Snow Hill, North Carolina has not hosted another minor league team.

== The ballpark ==
The Snow Hill Billies teams hosted home minor league games at Snow Hill Park. It was noted the ballpark was located on Mill Street, beside Contentnea Creek and was prone to flooding.

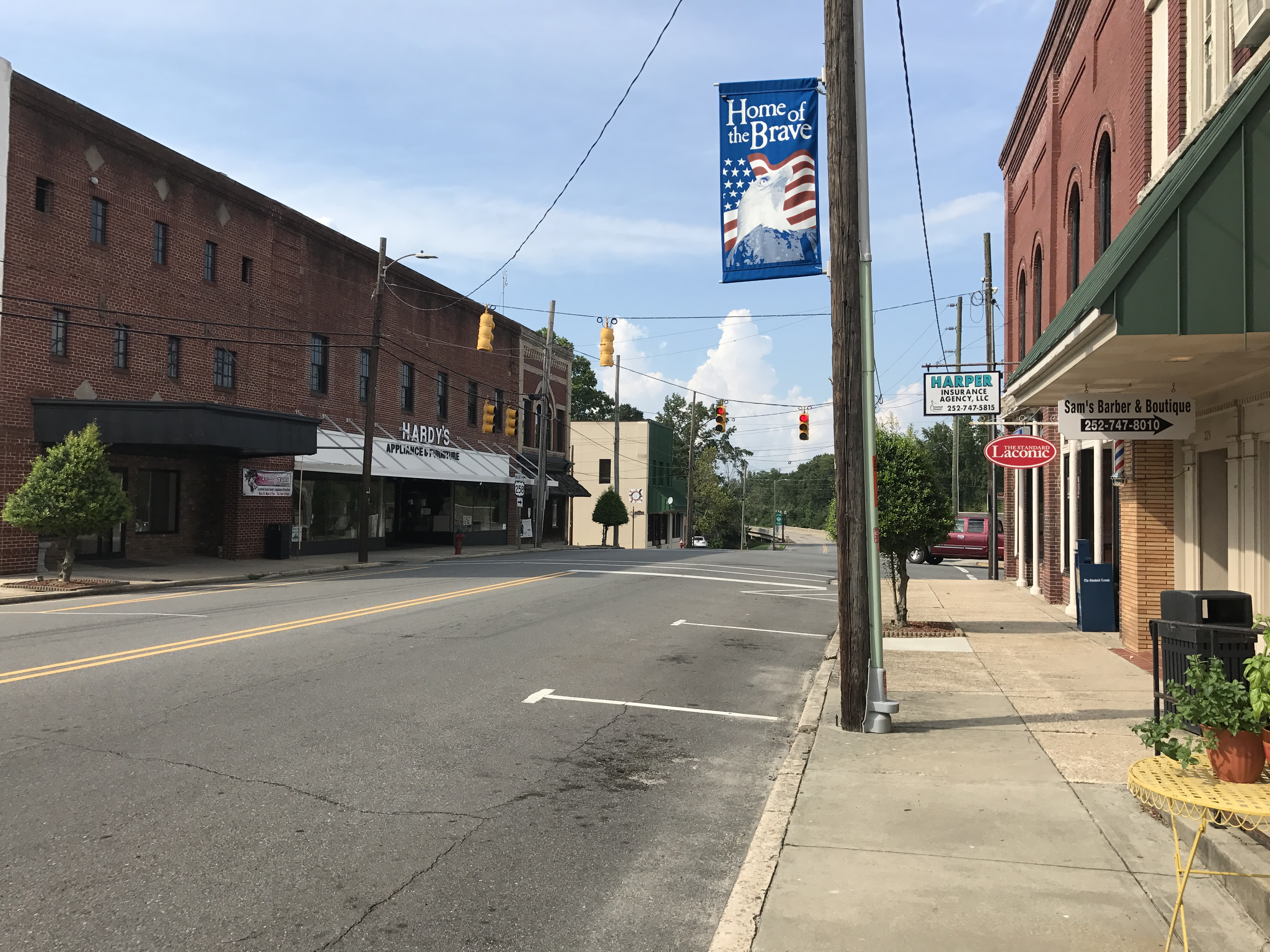
(2019) Snow Hill, North Carolina

== Timeline ==
Year(s)	# Yrs.	Team	Level	League	Ballpark
1937–1940	4	Snow Hill Billies	Class D	Coastal Plain League	Snow Hill Park

== Year–by–year records ==
Year	Record	Finish	Manager	Playoffs/Notes
1937	62–36	1st	D.C. "Peahead" Walker	League champions
1938	61–49	3rd	Peahead Walker	Lost league finals
1939	56–64	7th	Peahead Walker	Did not qualify
1940	62–64	5th	Dwight Wall	Did not qualify

== Notable alumni ==
- Bob Bowman (1934)
- Charlie Frye (1939)
- Al Gettel (1938)
- John Hyder (1937)
- Aaron Robinson (1937) MLB All-Star
- Vince Ventura (1937)
- D.C. "Peahead" Walker (1937–1939, MGR)
- Snow Hill Billies players
