= Coastal Plain League (disambiguation) =

The Coastal Plain League is a collegiate summer baseball league.

Coastal Plain League may also refer to:

- Coastal Plain League (Class D), former minor league circuit (1937–1941,1946–1952)
- Coastal Plain League (semi pro), former semi-pro baseball circuit (1935–1936)
