= Bill Herring (minor league pitcher) =

American baseball player and manager

William Arthur Herring (September 24, 1911 – September 29, 1996) was an American minor league baseball pitcher, player-manager and general manager.

== Early life ==
Herring was born in Seven Springs, North Carolina in September 1911 and graduated with a law degree from Wake Forest but decided to pursue a baseball career. He debuted in 1935 with the Portsmouth Truckers of the Piedmont League. He played three seasons in Portsmouth, going 29-29 on the mound and posting a .281 batting average at the plate in 1937.

== Career ==
The next two seasons were spent in the Coastal Plain League. 1938 saw Herring in Ayden, and in 1939, he pitched for Kinston. In Kinston, Herring was called on to take over as player-manager for Snake Henry, who had been suspended for a year after an ugly on-field altercation with an umpire. He rose to the challenge by leading the Eagles to a 43–29 record after he took over, and he helped himself out by going 22-11 with a 1.94 ERA. When he took over, Herring's team was in last place. At the end of the year, they advanced to the championship round of the playoffs only to lose to Williamston.

1940 turned out to be a disappointing campaign for Herring, who went 3–7 for Milwaukee Brewers and Montreal. The next two seasons were spent with the Wilson Tobs where he compiled a 32–7 record with an ERA under 3.00, helping Wilson achieve a Coastal Plain League championship as a player-manager in 1941. Hinting at his future career path in the front office, Herring also held the position of club president.

After an 8–5 season with Portland of the Pacific Coast League and some service in the Navy during World War II, Herring returned for another stint in the Coastal Plain League. This time he played for the Goldsboro Goldbugs, where he had the last three great seasons of his playing career going 54-24 with an ERA under 2.50. He also served as Goldsboro's general manager.

Herring finished up his playing career with seasons in Pensacola, Wilson, Panama City, and St. Petersburg. He ended his career with 187 minor league wins.

Herring became the General Manager for the Western League Lincoln Chiefs in 1954. In 1955, he returned to managing with the Piedmont League's Norfolk Tars. He later joined the Cleveland Indians organization, where he served two stints as manager of the Burlington Indians in 1961 and 1964. He then served as a scout for the New York Mets from 1965 until 1973.
