= Wally Millies =

American baseball player, scout, and manager

- Catcher
- Born: October 18, 1906; Chicago, Illinois, U.S.
- Died: February 28, 1995 (aged 88); Oak Lawn, Illinois, U.S.
- Batted: Right Threw: Right

MLB debut
- September 23, 1934, for the Brooklyn Dodgers

Last MLB appearance
- May 21, 1941, for the Philadelphia Phillies

MLB statistics
- Batting average: .243
- Home runs: 0
- Runs batted in: 65
- Stats at Baseball Reference

Teams
- Brooklyn Dodgers (1934); Washington Senators (1936–1937); Philadelphia Phillies (1939–1941)

Walter Louis Millies (October 18, 1906 – February 28, 1995) was an American professional baseball player, scout and manager whose career began in 1927 and extended into the 1970s. Born in Chicago, he was a catcher during his playing days who threw and batted right-handed and was listed as 5 feet 10 inches (1.78 m) tall and 170 pounds (77 kg). During World War II, he served in the United States Navy.

Millies appeared in 246 games in Major League Baseball over all or parts of six seasons (1934; 1936–1937; 1939–1941) for the Brooklyn Dodgers, Washington Senators and Philadelphia Phillies. He compiled a .243 career batting average with 158 hits, including 20 doubles and three triples, with 65 runs batted in. His finest season came in 1936 with Washington, as he set personal bests in plate appearances (229), runs scored (26), hits (67), and batting average (.312). He started 58 games as the Senators' backup catcher, playing behind left-handed-hitting Cliff Bolton.

Millies had a long career as a minor league manager following his big-league playing career, including a stint as the skipper of the Kinston Eagles of the Coastal Plain League. Then he was a scout for the New York Mets, Houston Astros and Montreal Expos, based in Oak Lawn, Illinois.

He died in Oak Lawn at the age of 88.
