= Denny Sothern =

American baseball player (1904–1977)

- Outfielder
- Born: January 20, 1904; Washington, D.C., U.S.
- Died: December 7, 1977 (aged 73); Durham, North Carolina, U.S.
- Batted: Right Threw: Right

MLB debut
- September 10, 1926, for the Philadelphia Phillies

Last MLB appearance
- September 21, 1931, for the Brooklyn Robins

MLB statistics
- Batting average: .280
- Home runs: 19
- Runs batted in: 115
- Stats at Baseball Reference

Teams
- Philadelphia Phillies (1926, 1928–1930); Pittsburgh Pirates (1930); Brooklyn Robins (1931)

Dennis Elwood Sothern (January 20, 1904 – December 7, 1977) was an American professional baseball outfielder. He played in Major League Baseball for the Philadelphia Phillies, Pittsburgh Pirates, and Brooklyn Robins.

While his birth name was Southern, he dropped the "u", adopting the name of Sothern. He did this when he was 15 or 16 years old so that he could get into the Marines to fight in World War I, which somehow enabled him to lie about his age (the youngest age for service was 18). He is known to have switched back to the use of his original last name of "Southern", which is used on his gravestone.

Sothern saw some time as a minor league manager following his major league career including a stint as the skipper of the Kinston Eagles of the Coastal Plain League and the New Bern Bears.

Sothern was considered to be one of the fastest outfielders during his time. He was on his way to being a star professional baseball player with a storied career but it abruptly ended.

Sothern was once the cause of a brawl in the outfield stands among fans. He was being heckled by the home crowd and spit tobacco juice on one of the fans. This started a brawl in the stands but he was able to escape getting involved in the melee.

In a brief five year, 357 game career, he compiled a .280 batting average (379-for-1355) with 219 runs, 19 home runs and 115 runs batted in. Defensively, he recorded a .966 fielding percentage as an outfielder.

He was married multiple times fathering at least five children but the number is not known.

He died in New Bern, North Carolina in the Veterans Hospital and is buried in Onslow, NC.

== Sources ==
- Career statistics from Baseball Reference · Baseball Reference (Minors) · Retrosheet · Baseball Almanac
- Gaunt, Robert (1997). We Would Have Played Forever: The Story of the Coastal Plain Baseball League. Baseball America, Inc. ISBN 0-945164-02-5.
