= Soup Campbell =

American baseball player (1915–2000)

- Outfielder
- Born: March 7, 1915; Sparta, Virginia, U.S.
- Died: February 16, 2000 (aged 84); Sparta, Virginia, U.S.
- Batted: Left Threw: Right

MLB debut
- April 21, 1940, for the Cleveland Indians

Last MLB appearance
- September 28, 1941, for the Cleveland Indians

MLB statistics
- Batting average: .246
- Home runs: 3
- Runs batted in: 37
- Stats at Baseball Reference

Teams
- Cleveland Indians (1940–1941)

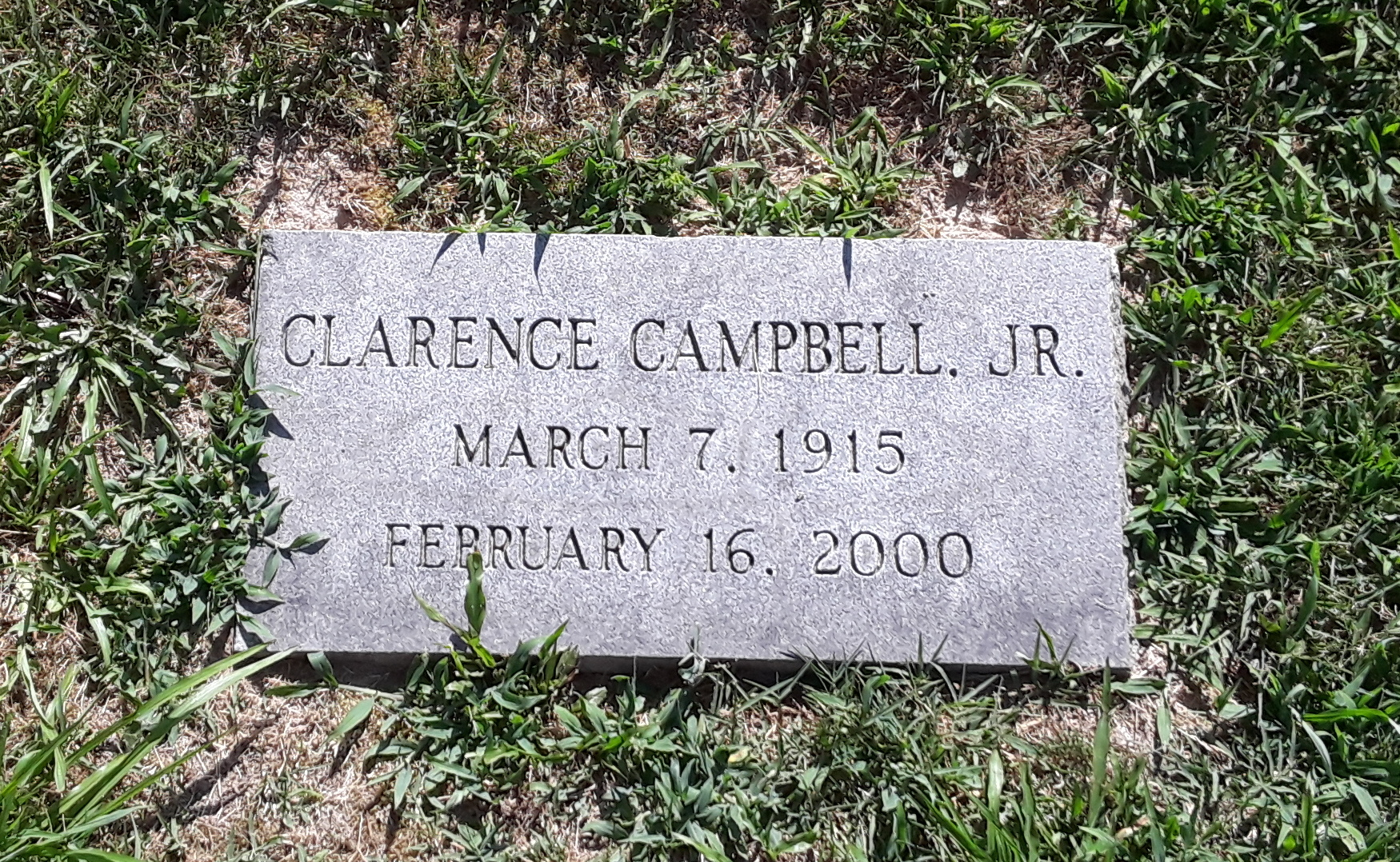
Campbell's grave marker, in Salem Baptist Church cemetery, Sparta, Virginia

Clarence Campbell, better known as Soup Campbell (after Campbell's Soup) (March 7, 1915 – February 16, 2000) was an American backup outfielder in Major League Baseball who played from 1940 through 1941 for the Cleveland Indians. Listed at 6 ft 1 in (1.85 m), 188 lb., Campbell batted left-handed and threw right-handed. He was born in Sparta, Virginia. In a two-season career, Campbell was a .246 hitter (96-for-432) with three home runs and 37 runs batted in in 139 games, including 10 doubles, four triples, one stolen base, and a .315 on-base percentage.

Campbell began his professional career with the Tarboro Serpents of the Coastal Plain League, playing for them in 1937 and 1938. He then spent the 1939 season with the New Orleans Pelicans, batting .321 in 155 games. He was promoted to the Indians major league roster in 1940 and made his debut on April 21. In 25 games, he had a .226 batting average, serving as a backup outfielder. In 1941, Campbell saw more playing time, and had a .250 batting average in 104 games.

He enlisted in the U.S. Army during World War II, missing the 1942-1945 seasons. He returned to baseball action with the Baltimore Orioles of the International League in 1946 after failing to make the Indians roster out of spring training; he had requested the demotion in order to be an everyday player. He compiled a .298 average and 23 homers in 579 minor league games in a span of five years (1937–39, 1946–47). He later managed for the 1952 Lexington team of the North Carolina State League. Campbell died in Sparta at the age of 84.
