= Williamston Martins =

- 1937–1941; Williamston, North Carolina

Minor league affiliations
- Class: Class D (1937–1941)
- League: Coastal Plain League (1937–1941)

Major league affiliations
- Team: None

Minor league titles
- League titles (1): 1939
- Wild card berths (1): 1937

Team data
- Name: Williamston Martins (1937–1941)
- Ballpark: Taylor Field (1937–1941)

The Williamston Martins were a minor league baseball team based in Williamston, North Carolina. From 1937 to 1941, the Martins played as exclusively as members of the Coastal Plain League, winning the 1939 league championship. Williamston hosted home minor league games at Taylor Field.

== History ==
The Williamston "Martins" moniker was first used by a semi–pro team that played in an Independent league named the Coastal Plain League prior to minor league play.

Minor league baseball began in Williamston, North Carolina in 1937. The 1937 Williamston Martins, became charter members of the eight–team Class D level Coastal Plain League. Williamston joined the Ayden Aces, Goldsboro Goldbugs, Greenville Greenies, Kinston Eagles, New Bern Bears, Snow Hill Billies and Tarboro Combs in playing the first season of Class D level baseball for the league.

The Williamston use of the "Martins" moniker corresponds with the city of Williamston being the county seat of Martin County, North Carolina.

Beginning Coastal Plain League play on May 6, 1937, the Williamston Martins finished the regular season in second place. The Martins ended the season with a record of 55–41, playing under manager Arthur Hauger in the eight–team Coastal Plain League. The Martins finished 6.0 games behind the first place Snow Hill Billies in the final standings to qualify for the four–team playoffs. Williamston lost in the first round of the playoffs, as the Tarboro Combs defeated Williamston 3 games to 0. Snow Hill won the championship.

Continuing minor league play, the 1938 Williamston Martins placed fifth in the eight–team Coastal Plain League standings and did not qualify for the playoffs. Playing under returning manager Arthur Hauger, the Martins finished the 1938 season with a record of 56–56 in the Coastal Plain League. Williamston finished 7.0 games behind the first place New Bern Bears in the final standings, missing the playoffs, which were won by New Bern. Williamston pitcher James Rollins led the league with 202 strikeouts.

The Williamston Martins won the 1939 Coastal Plain League Championship. In the regular season, the Martins placed third with a record of 65–57, playing under manager Paul O'Malley and finishing 9.0 games behind the first place Greenville Greenies. In the first round of the playoffs, Williamston defeated the Goldsboro Goldbugs 4 games to 1 to advance. in the Finals, the Williamston Martins won the championship, defeating the Kinston Eagles 4 games to 1. Pitcher Harry Swain of Williamston led the league with 186 strikeouts.

In the season following their championship, the 1940 Williamston Martins finished last in the Coastal Carolina League. The Martins placed eighth in the eight–team league, with a record of 47–78, playing under managers Dixie Parker and Harry Swain. Williamston finished 29.5 games behind the first place Wilson Tobs in the final league standings. Player/manager Harry Swain of Williamston again led the Coastal Carolina league with 215 strikeouts as a pitcher.

In their final season of play, the 1941 Williamston Martins did not qualify for the Coastal Carolina League playoffs. The Martins finished the 1941 season with a record of 56–61 to place sixth in the eight-team standings, playing the season under manager Frank Rodgers. Williamston finished 31.0 games behind the first place Wilson Tobs in the final regular season standings. After the 1941 season playoffs, won by Wilson, the Coastal Carolina League folded due to World War II. When the league resumed play in 1946, Williamston did not field a team.

Williamston, North Carolina has not hosted another minor league team.

== The ballpark ==
The Williamston Martins teams played home minor league games at Taylor Field. The ballpark reportedly had a capacity of 3,000 and dimensions (Left, Center, Right) of 290–320–340. The ballpark was noted to have been located behind the former Williamston High School at North Smithwick & Grace Street, Williamston, North Carolina.

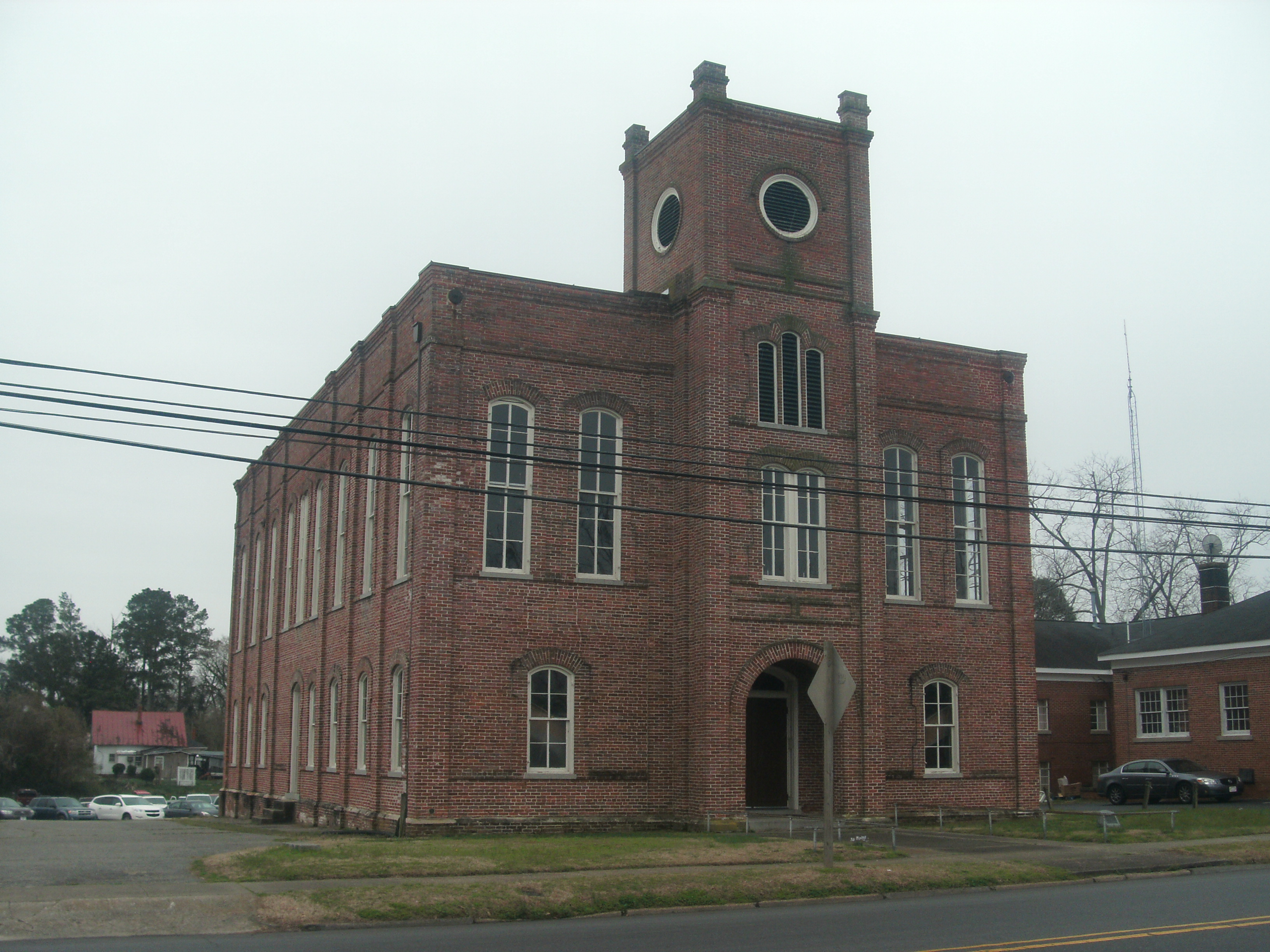
(2015) Old Martin County Courthouse. National Register of Historic Places. Williamston, North Carolina

== Timeline ==
Year(s)	# Yrs.	Team	Level	League	Ballpark
1937–1941	5	Williamston Martins	Class D	Coastal Plain League	Taylor Field

== Year–by–year records ==
Year	Record	Finish	Manager	Playoffs/Notes
1937	55–41	2nd	Arthur Hauger	Lost in 1st round
1938	56–56	5th	Arthur Hauger	Did not qualify
1939	65–57	3rd	Paul "Red" O'Malley	League Champs
1940	47–78	8th	Dixie Parker / Harry Swain	Did not qualify
1941	56–61	6th	Frank Rodgers	Did not qualify

== Notable alumni ==
- Danny Gardella (1940)
- Arthur Hauger (1937–1938)
- Dixie Parker (1940, MGR)
- Les Rock (1940)
- Chuck Stevens (1937)
- Jim Stroner (1939)

== See also ==
- Williamston Martins players
