= Leesburg Athletics =

- 1937–1968; (1937–1941, 1946–1953, 1956–1957, 1960–1961, 1965–1968); Leesburg, Florida

Minor league affiliations
- Previous classes: Class A (1963–1968); Class D (1937–1962)
- League: Florida State League (1937–1968)

Major league affiliations
- Previous teams: Oakland Athletics (1968); Kansas City Athletics (1965–1967); Baltimore Orioles (1960–1961); Milwaukee Braves (1956–1957); Non-Affiliated (1950–1953); Brooklyn Dodgers (1949); Pittsburgh Pirates (1947–1948); Non-Affiliated (1937–1941, 1946)

Minor league titles
- League titles (2): 1941; 1966

Team data
- Previous names: Leesburg Athletics (1965–1968); Leesburg Orioles (1960–1961); Leesburg Braves (1956–1957); Leesburg Lakers (1953); Leesburg Packers (1946, 1950–1952); Leesburg Dodgers (1949); Leesburg Pirates (1947–1948); Leesburg Anglers (1938–1941); Leesburg Gondoliers (1937–1938)
- Previous parks: Pat Thomas Stadium

The Leesburg Athletics (or the interchangeable A's) was the final name of a professional minor league baseball team, based in Leesburg, Florida from 1965 to 1968. Beginning play in 1937, Leesburg teams played exclusively as members of the Florida State League, winning league championships in 1941 and 1966.

Baseball Hall of Fame member Rollie Fingers played for the 1965 Leesburg Athletics.

== History ==
The club was first formed in 1937 as the Leesburg Gondoliers, a Florida State League team that did not share an affiliation with a big-league club. From 1939–1941 the team became known as the Leesburg Anglers, who again were a non-affiliated minor league team. After not hosting a team from 1942–1945 the Anglers would return in 1946 as the Packers.

From 1947–1948 the team became the Leesburg Pirates, and were a Class-D affiliate of the Pittsburgh Pirates. In 1949 the Brooklyn Dodgers operated the team as the Leesburg Dodgers. They used four different managers as the Dodgers and went 37-97. 44-year-old Luke Hamlin, who managed for them, also pitched in eight games for them.

From 1950–1952 they would again become an un-affiliated team known as the Leesburg Packers. In 1953 the team would change its name to the Leesburg Lakers but would remain independent of any affiliation. The team would go on hiatus for two seasons and would then emerge in 1956 as an affiliate of the Milwaukee Braves, known as the Leesburg Braves. They would remain that way until the end of the 1957 season. After that, they would become the Leesburg Orioles from 1960–1961 and were affiliated with the Baltimore Orioles. Again breaking for a few years the team would re-emerge for a final time, this time as the Leesburg A's from 1965–1968, they would be an affiliate of the Kansas City/Oakland A's during this stint, winning the 1966 league championship.

Rollie Fingers played for the Leesburg Athletics in 1965 and was inducted into the Baseball Hall of Fame in 1992.

The Leesburg teams won Florida State League championships in 1941 and 1966.

== Year-by-year records ==
| Year | Record | Finish | Manager | Playoffs |
|---|---|---|---|---|
| 1937 | 71-67 | 4th | Spec Meadows | Lost in 1st round |
| 1938 | 87-52 | 1st | Nelson Leach | Lost league finals |
| 1939 | 72-65 | 3rd | Nellie Leach | Lost in 1st round |
| 1940 | 62-77 | 6th | Emil Yde | Did not qualify |
| 1941 | 63-66 | 4th | Wilbur Good Jr. | League champions |
| 1946 | 63-71 | 5th | Bill Good | Did not qualify |
| 1947 | 54-81 | 7th | Bill Good | Did not qualify |
| 1948 | 60-77 | 6th | Ed Leip | Did not qualify |
| 1949 | 37-97 | 8th | Lou Haneles / Julian Acosta; Luke Hamlin | Did not qualify |
| 1950 | 54-84 | 7th | Frank Piet / Floyd Clift; Bill Steinecke | Did not qualify |
| 1951 | 71-69 | 4th | Floyd Clift, Mickey Burnett | Lost in 1st round |
| 1952 | 52-84 | 7th | Walt Chipple / Don Anderson; John Pawlick / Bob Latshaw | Did not qualify |
| 1953 | 56-77 | 6th | Red Dulaney / Frank Barrett | Did not qualify |
| 1956 | 58-82 | 7th | Tommy Giordano | Did not qualify |
| 1957 | 64-75 | 5th | Tommy Giordano | Did not qualify |
| 1960 | 53-80 | 8th | Bob Hooper | Did not qualify |
| 1961 | 56-80 | 7th | Billy DeMars / Cal Ripken Sr. Ray Scarborough | Did not qualify |
| 1965 | 53-80 | 9th | Tony Frulio | Did not qualify |
| 1966 | 87-44 | 2nd | James Williams | League champions |
| 1967 | 64-71 | 5th | James Williams | Did not qualify |
| 1968 | 51-92 | 10th | Al Ronning | Did not qualify |

== Notable alumni ==
- Rollie Fingers (1965) Inducted Baseball Hall of Fame, 1992
- Julian Acosta (1948, MGR)
- Frank Barrett (1953, MGR)
- Johnny Beazley (1937)
- Walt Chipple (1952, MGR)
- Billy DeMars (1961, MGR)
- Darrell Evans (1967) 2x MLB All-Star
- Tommy Giordano (1956-1957, MGR)
- Luke Hamlin (1948, MGR; 1949)
- Lou Haneles (1948, MGR)
- Bob Hooper (1960, MGR)
- Bobby Knoop (1956) MLB All-Star
- Bob Latshaw (1952, MGR)
- Ed Leip (1947, MGR)
- Lee Meadows (1937)
- Cal Ripken, Sr. (1961, MGR)
- Ray Scarborough (1961, MGR)
- Bill Steinecke (1950, MGR)
- Gene Tenace (1966-1967) MLB All-Star; 1972 World Series M.V.P.
