= Lou Haneles =

American baseball player and manager

Louis Aaron Haneles (September 15, 1916 in Chicago, Illinois – November 29, 2006 in Miami, Florida) was a minor league baseball player, manager, general manager and owner.

Haneles began his professional career in 1936, at the age of 19. He played from 1936 to 1938, in 1940, 1946 and 1949. In total, he appeared in 322 games, hitting .256 with 230 hits in 900 at-bats. He mostly played as a left-handed catcher and always promoted the better suitability of left-handers for the catcher position.

He took his first managing job in 1940, heading the Shelby Colonels before being replaced by Art Patchin. He was a co-owner and the general manager of the Bloomingdale Troopers at the beginning of 1946, and by the end of the season he was a player, manager and owner of the Walden Hummingbirds.

in 1947, the Stamford Bombers franchise was owned Haneles and Stan Moor. Haneles would serve as the teams' general manager and would integrate the team roster. In 1946 and 1947, 16 black players crossed the color line in minor league baseball. Six of them were signed by Haneles to Stamford in 1947.

In June, 1948, he sued the Brooklyn Dodgers and Branch Rickey for $100,000, claiming the Dodgers took the Walden franchise, transferred it to Kingston, New York and sold it.

In June 1948, Haneles and Eddie Ainsmith organized the National Girls Baseball League, which was to operate in the following year.

Haneles was the general manager of the Leesburg Dodgers in 1949. He began the year as their manager as well, however he gave up duties and was replaced by Julian Acosta.

He also ran baseball schools for a large portion of his life. In Florida, he had a school set up with Mal Fichman that was to prepare players not drafted for minor league baseball.

== Sources ==
- June 16, 1948 Sporting News
- June 30, 1948 Sporting News
- June 22, 1949 Sporting News
- December 22, 1980 Sporting News
