= Peahead Walker =

American baseball player (1899–1970)

Biographical details
- Born: February 17, 1899; Ensley, Alabama, U.S.
- Died: July 16, 1970 (aged 71); Charlotte, North Carolina, U.S.

Playing career

Football
- 1916: Birmingham
- 1917: Howard (AL)
- 1919–1920: Howard (AL)

Baseball
- c. 1920: Howard (AL)
- 1921: Wilson Bugs
- 1923: Wilson Bugs
- 1924: Norfolk Tars
- 1924: Rochester Tribe
- 1925: Norfolk Tars
- 1927: Wilson Bugs
- 1928–1929: York White Roses
- 1930: Bloomington Cubs
- 1930: Decatur Commodores
- 1931: Winston-Salem Twins
- 1932: Wilmington Pirates
- Positions: Quarterback (football); Shortstop, third baseman, second baseman (baseball)

Coaching career (HC unless noted)

Football
- 1926: Atlantic Christian
- 1927–1936: Elon
- 1937–1950: Wake Forest
- 1951: Yale (assistant)
- 1952–1959: Montreal Alouettes

Basketball
- 1927–1937: Elon

Baseball
- 1928–1937: Elon
- 1937–1939: Snow Hill Billies

Head coaching record
- Overall: 127–93–10 (college football); 124–84 (college basketball); 124–61 (college baseball); 59–48–1 (CFL)
- Bowls: 1–1

Accomplishments and honors

Championships
- Football; 4 North State (1933–1936)

Douglas Clyde "Peahead" Walker (February 17, 1899 – July 16, 1970) was an American football and baseball player, and coach of American football, Canadian football, basketball, and baseball. Walker served as the head football coach at Atlantic Christian College—now Barton College—in 1926, at Elon University from 1927 to 1936, and at Wake Forest University from 1937 to 1950, compiling a career college football record of 127–93–10. At Elon, Walker was also the head basketball coach (1927–1937) and the head baseball coach (1928–1937). In 1952 Walker moved to the Canadian Football League (CFL) to become the head coach of the Montreal Alouettes. He remained with the team until 1959, tallying a mark of 59–48–1 in eight seasons. Walker also played minor league baseball with a number of clubs between 1921 and 1932. He managed the Snow Hill Billies of the Coastal Plain League from 1937 to 1939.

== Early life ==
Walker was born on February 17, 1899, in Birmingham, Alabama. He was the second of nine children born to Zachary T. and Miriam Walker. Walker's birth name was Daniah Clyde Walker. He changed his first name to Douglas while in college, but was known for most his life by his colorful nickname, which he acquired by the time he was a teenager. Walker briefly attended Birmingham College (later Birmingham Southern) then enrolled at Howard College in Birmingham. Though Walker played four seasons of varsity sports at Howard, he did not receive a degree from the college. He did complete college work and received a degree from Elon College while he was working there as a coach, graduating with the class of 1931., After leaving Howard and Birmingham, Walker began his professional baseball career. In the off-season he taught and coached at high schools in West Point, Ga. and in Roanoke, Ala, from 1922-25. Walker also wed his first wife, Carolyn, at about this time. They had two children, D.C. Jr., and Walter Hill Walker, both born during his high school coaching days.

== Baseball ==
Walker played minor league baseball in parts of eleven seasons spanning 1921 to 1932. Primarily a shortstop, he also played at second base and third base. He posted a career .300 batting average and 30 home runs in 1078 games. Notably, he batted over .320 four times, with a career-high of .338 in 1928 with the York White Roses.

From 1937 to 1939 he managed the Snow Hill Billies of the Class D Coastal Plain League, leading them to the playoffs twice and to one league championship.

== Football ==
Walker's coaching career began in 1926 at Atlantic Christian College, today known as Barton College, in Wilson, North Carolina, where he also played professional baseball for the Wilson Bugs of the Virginia League. In his one year as head football coach, Walker was 6–1–1 and his "Little Christians" (later, "Bulldogs") were scored upon only once. He also had success with the Atlantic Christian basketball and baseball teams.

Next, in 1927, Walker accepted the position of head coach of all three major teams at Elon College (now Elon University) near Burlington, North Carolina. He coached at Elon for ten seasons, earning a 44–41–4 record and winning four North State Conference championships.

Walker coached at Wake Forest University from 1937 to 1950. He compiled a record of 77–51–6 during his 14 years at the school and led the Deacons to two bowl games, a win over South Carolina in the inaugural Gator Bowl in 1946 and a 20–7 loss to Baylor in the 1949 Dixie Bowl. He is tied with Jim Grobe as the program's winningest head coach.

Walker left Wake in the spring of 1951 over a salary dispute with the college's new president, Harold Tribble. Following Wake Forest's superb 1950 football season, in which the Deacons went 6–1–2 and narrowly missed winning the Southern Conference championship, the athletic committee of the Wake Forest College Board of Trustees approved a contract extension, and a raise in Walker's annual salary from $7,500 per year to $9,000. The committee action occurred in December, but by when March rolled around President Tribble still had not approved it. Walker attempted to use a coaching offer from Yale University as leverage to force Tribble's hand, but Tribble called his bluff, offering a raise to $8,000 — or exactly what Yale had offered Walker to work as an assistant under Walker's long-time friend, Herman Hickman. Believing Tribble had gone back on a handshake deal, and miffed at the low-ball offer, Walker accepted the Yale position, ending the tenure of Wake Forest's most successful football coach.

After one year at Yale, he replaced the retiring Lew Hayman as the second head coach of the Canadian Football League's Montreal Alouettes. There he had a 59–48–1 record in eight seasons and won four division titles, where they reached and lost the Grey Cup three straight years, losing all.three He retired after 1959 season. His 59 wins are tied for a club record and he still holds the record for most losses and games coached. After his retirement he became a scout for the New York Giants. He was elected into the Wake Forest Athletics Hall of Fame after his death in 1970.

== Later life and death ==
One of Walker's longtime friends was Arnold Palmer, who Walker tried to recruit to his football team while Palmer was at Wake Forest.

Walker died of a stroke on July 16, 1970, in Charlotte, North Carolina, at the age of 71.

== Head coaching record ==
=== College football ===
Year	Team	Overall	Conference	Standing	Bowl/playoffs	AP^{#}
Atlantic Christian Bulldogs (Independent) (1926)
1926	Atlantic Christian	6–1–1				
Atlantic Christian:		6–1–1				
Elon Fightin' Christians (Independent) (1927–1929)
1927	Elon	3–4–1				
1928	Elon	2–7				
1929	Elon	5–3				
Elon Fightin' Christians (North State Conference) (1930–1936)
1930	Elon	6–3	4–1	2nd		
1931	Elon	3–5	2–1	T–2nd		
1932	Elon	2–6	0–3	T–5th		
1933	Elon	5–3–1	2–0–1	1st		
1934	Elon	6–2–1	3–0–1	T–1st		
1935	Elon	6–3	3–0	1st		
1936	Elon	6–5	3–0	1st		
Elon:		44–41–3	17–5–2			
Wake Forest Demon Deacons (Southern Conference) (1937–1950)
1937	Wake Forest	3–6	1–4	T–13th		
1938	Wake Forest	4–5–1	3–4–1	9th		
1939	Wake Forest	7–3	3–3	T–7th		
1940	Wake Forest	7–3	4–2	3rd		
1941	Wake Forest	5–5–1	4–2–1	7th		
1942	Wake Forest	6–2–1	6–1–1	3rd		
1943	Wake Forest	4–5	3–2	4th		
1944	Wake Forest	8–1	6–1	2nd		
1945	Wake Forest	5–3–1	4–1–1	2nd	W Gator	19
1946	Wake Forest	6–3	2–3	T–11th		
1947	Wake Forest	6–4	3–4	10th		
1948	Wake Forest	6–4	5–2	5th	L Dixie	20
1949	Wake Forest	4–6	3–3	T–9th		
1950	Wake Forest	6–1–2	6–1–1	4th		
Wake Forest:		77–51–6	53–33–5			
Total:		127–93–10				
National championship Conference title Conference division title or championship game berth

=== CFL coaching record ===
Team	Year	Regular season					Postseason		
Team	Year	Won	Lost	Ties	Win %	Finish	Won	Lost	Result
MTL	1952	2	10	0	.167	4th in West Division			
MTL	1953	8	6	0	.571	1st in Interprovincial Rugby Football Union	0	2	Lost Lost IRFU Finals (HAM)
MTL	1954	11	3	0	.786	1st in Interprovincial Rugby Football Union	2	1	Lost 42nd Grey Cup (WDM)
MTL	1955	9	3	0	.750	1st in Interprovincial Rugby Football Union	1	1	Lost 43rd Grey Cup (WDM)
MTL	1956	10	4	0	.714	1st in Interprovincial Rugby Football Union	2	1	Lost 44th Grey Cup (WDM)
MTL	1957	6	8	0	.429	3rd in Interprovincial Rugby Football Union	1	3	Lost in IRFU Finals (HAM)
MTL	1958	7	6	1	.536	2nd in Interprovincial Rugby Football Union	0	1	Lost in IRFU Semi-Finals (OTT)
MTL	1959	6	8	0	.429	3rd in Interprovincial Rugby Football Union	0	1	Lost in IRFU Finals (OTT)
Total		59	48	1	.551	4 Division Championships	6	9	
