= Wayne Blackburn =

American baseball player

Blackburn

Wayne Tennyson Blackburn (July 10, 1914 – February 16, 2000) was a major league baseball coach and minor league player-manager.

Blackburn was born in Mount Joy, Ohio.

Blackburn was an infielder nineteen years (1936–1956), all in the minor leagues, losing one year to military service and one year to inactivity. Blackburn drew over 1400 walks in 2016 minor league games. From 1948 to 1956, he had 715 hits and 742 walks in 711 games. He led the 1936 KITTY League with 124 runs, the 1943 American Association with 114 runs, and the 1951 KITTY with 116 runs. He also led the 1948 Southern Association with 36 SB.

Blackburn was briefly a player-manager at the end of the season in 1937 for the Peoria Reds of the Three-I League. Blackburn truly began his managerial career in 1951 with the Owensboro Oilers. He moved to the Detroit Tigers farm system, where he was a player-manager in the minors (1952–1954, 1956), minor league manager (1958, 1965–66, 1968) and major league coach (1963–64). From 1968 to 1969, Wayne coached the Panamanian baseball team in the Caribbean Series while living in Mayaguez, Puerto Rico, with his children and wife.

His Kinston Eagles had the best record in the 1952 Coastal Plain League, as did the Augusta Tigers of the South Atlantic League he took over in mid-1958. His teams also lost in the playoffs in 1953 and 1954.

Blackburn scouted for the Detroit Tigers into at least the mid-1980s.

He married Jeanne Anderson on October 14, 1939. Together, they had six children: Joan Blackburn, Michael Blackburn, Rebecca Blackburn, Kevin Blackburn, Linda Marie Blackburn, and Timothy Blackburn. He served in the United States Army as a TEC 4 in 1945 during the World War II era. He died at age 86 at Hillview Retirement Center in Portsmouth, Ohio, and is buried at Greenlawn Cemetery in Portsmouth, Ohio. His legacy lives on through his contribution to Portsmouth's baseball history, and he is memorialized on the Portsmouth floodwall.

== Year-by-year managerial record ==
Year	Team	League	Record	Finish	Organization	Playoffs	
1937	Peoria Reds	Three-I League			Cincinnati Reds		replaced Ben Tincup
1951	Owensboro Oilers	KITTY League	71–48	2nd	none	Lost League Finals	
1952	Kinston Eagles	Coastal Plain League	76–47	1st	Detroit Tigers	Lost in 1st round	
1953	Wausau Timberjacks	Wisconsin State League	76–49	2nd	Detroit Tigers	Lost League Finals	
1954	Jamestown Falcons	PONY League			Detroit Tigers		replaced Danny Litwhiler
1956	Jamestown Falcons	PONY League			Detroit Tigers		replaced Don Lund
1958	Augusta Tigers	South Atlantic League			Detroit Tigers		replaced Stan Charnofsky
1965	Montgomery Rebels	Southern League	63–74	6th	Detroit Tigers		
1966	Montgomery Rebels	Southern League	66–72	5th	Detroit Tigers		
1968	GCL Tigers	Gulf Coast League	27–36	7th	Detroit Tigers	none	
