= Mount Joy, Ohio =

Unincorporated community in Ohio, U.S.

Coordinates: 38°57′05″N 83°10′25″W

Mount Joy is an unincorporated community in Scioto County, in the U.S. state of Ohio.

== History ==
A post office called Mount Joy was established in 1871, and remained in operation until 1918. The community was named for Thomas Mt. Joy, a land agent.

== Notable person ==
Wayne Blackburn, a baseball coach and team manager, was born at Mount Joy in 1914.
