= Les Burge =

American baseball player

Kermon Lester Burge (May 17, 1917 – March 1, 1996) was a minor league baseball first baseman and manager whose career spanned from the 1930s to the 1950s.

He began his career in 1938, playing for the Class-D New Bern Bears of the Coastal Plain League. He hit .348 with 98 hits, 21 doubles, 22 home runs and a .699 slugging percentage that year, leading the league in slugging percentage and finishing second, behind Bennie Rothstein, in home runs. He split 1939 between the Class-B Savannah Indians of the South Atlantic League and the Class-A1 Atlanta Crackers of the Southern Association, hitting a combined .286 with 14 home runs and 10 triples in 144 games.

He returned to Atlanta again in 1940, hitting .277 with 12 home runs and 82 hits in 88 games. Once more with the Crackers in 1941, Burge batted .311 with 163 hits, 38 home runs, 146 RBI, 331 total bases and a .632 slugging percentage. He led the league in home runs, RBI and slugging percentage and tied Oris Hockett for second, behind Culley Rikard, in total bases. He was unanimously voted the Southern Association Most Valuable Player that season.

He signed with the Brooklyn Dodgers for 1942 and was a touted prospect. He reported to spring training with a 1-B military draftee classification, but played the whole season for the Montreal Royals of the Triple-A International League and hit .250 with 28 home runs and 88 RBI in 152 games. He led the league in home runs and finished third in strikeouts. He was set to be Dolph Camilli's replacement at first base on the major league team in 1943, but was instead called into service for World War II and did not play professionally again until 1946. He joined the United States Army on November 7, 1942. He was stationed at Fort Oglethorpe in Georgia.

In 1946, he returned to Montreal in the Dodgers system after leaving the military. Despite missing three years to the service, the Dodgers still had hopes for the first baseman, with team general manager Branch Rickey saying he had the makings of a "great hitter." That season, he hit .285 with 15 home runs, 101 RBI and a .401 on-base percentage in 121 games. He tied Eddie Joost for third in the league in RBI. He played for and managed the Double-A Fort Worth Cats of the Texas League – another Dodgers affiliate – in 1947, hitting .279 with seven home runs in 110 games and leading the team to a 95-58 second-place finish. The team lost in the first round of the playoffs. He began 1948 as manager of the Cats, but did not play for the team. Partway through the year, he moved to the Texas League's Dallas Eagles, an unaffiliated team, and hit .319 with nine home runs in 84 games. He also managed the squad for the latter part of the season, replacing Jimmy Adair.

In 1949, Burge played for the Shreveport Sports of the Texas League and hit .294 with 24 home runs in 131 games. He split his final season, 1950, between the Sports and the Class-B Greensboro Patriots of the Carolina League, hitting a combined .249 with 13 home runs in 119 games.

Overall, Burge played ten seasons in the minor leagues and hit .288 with 182 home runs in 1,181 games. He eclipsed the 20-home run mark four times and the .300 batting average mark thrice.

Burge was born in Stokes County, North Carolina and died in High Point, North Carolina.
