= Julián Acosta =

Cuban baseball player and manager (1916–1983)

Julio "Julian" Acosta
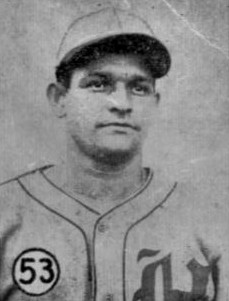
- Born: 12 August 1916; Marianao, Cuba
- Died: 30 August 1983 (aged 67); Miami-Dade County, Florida, U.S.
- Batted: Left Threw: Left

debut
- 1940

Career statistics

Teams
- Cuban league playing career: Cienfuegos (1938–1944); Marianao (1944–1945, 1945–1946); Habana (1945–1946, 1947–1948); Minor league playing career: Goldsboro Goldbugs (1940); Mayodan Millers (1940); Goldsboro Goldbugs (1941); Sanford Spinners (1942); Richmond Colts (1942–43, 1948); Milwaukee Brewers (1943–45); Little Rock Travelers (1946); Anniston Rams (1946–47); Miami Tourists (1947); Fort Lauderdale Braves (1947–48); Leesburg Dodgers (1949); Del Rio Cowboys (1950); Ballinger Cats (1950); Decatur Commodores (1952); Texarkana Bears (1953); Gainesville Owls (1953); Lafayette Bulls (1953); Managerial career: Leesburg Dodgers (1949); Decatur Commodores (1952)

Julio "Julian" Acosta (12 August 1916 – 30 August 1983) was a Cuban minor league baseball player who won 96 games as a pitcher, collected at least 749 hits as a batter and spent time at first base and in the outfield. He also spent several years pitching in Cuba and was a manager for a couple of seasons.

He began his career as a pitcher, moving to the field later on. In his first professional season, 1940, he went 13-10 with a 4.12 ERA in 38 games for the Goldsboro Goldbugs and Mayodan Millers. With the Goldbugs the next year, he went 17-17 with a 3.10 ERA in 40 games, leading the teams in wins, losses, appearances, innings pitched (276), hits allowed (273), runs (120) and earned runs (95). No other pitcher threw more than 177 innings or won more than 12 games (Jake Wade accomplished both).

After a mediocre 1942, Acosta had perhaps his best season as a pitcher in 1943, going a combined 20-9 with a 2.33 ERA in 39 games for the Richmond Colts and Milwaukee Brewers. In 270 innings of work, he allowed only 207 hits. Despite splitting the season between two teams, he managed to lead the Brewers in wins. He spent the next two years with the Brewers, going 13-10 with a 3.89 ERA and then 15-10 with a 3.44 ERA. Following his time with Milwaukee, he pitched three more average seasons.

For most of his career, he was not a high-average (he did not hit above .235 from 1944 to 1946) or power hitter (he eclipsed ten home runs only once), however in 1950, he hit a combined .328 with 63 doubles, five triples and 12 home runs for the Ballinger Cats and Del Rio Cowboys. Despite spending only 96 games with Ballinger, he led the team in doubles with 41, out-pacing the next closest batter (Walter Williams, who spent 105 games with the team) by 17. Previously, he had never hit more than 27 doubles in a season. In 1952, he hit .316 with the Decatur Commodores, smashing 29 doubles and leading the team.

Overall, in nine minor league seasons as a pitcher, he went 96-76 in 259 games. In 13 years as a batter, he had at least 2,782 at-bats and 749 hits, at least 175 of which were doubles, over 867 games.

He managed the Leesburg Dodgers for part of the 1949 season, replacing Jack Harrison and being replaced by Lou Haneles. In 1952, he led the Decatur Commodores to a 73-52 record, and eventually the league championship.

== Cuban statistics ==
Year	Team	League	G	CG	W	L	Pct.
.
1938-39	Cienfuegos	Cuban	3	0	1	0	1.000
1941	Cienfuegos	American Series	20	3	6	4	.600
1942	Cienfuegos	American Series	21	7	5	8	.385
1943-44	Cienfuegos	Cuban	20	7	7	5	.583
1944-45	Marianao	Cuban	20	2	2	8	.200
1945-46	Habana	Cuban	18	5	4	3	.571
1945-46	Marianao	Cuban	10	2	3	4	.429
1946-47	Matanzas	Cuban	8	--	4	3	.571
1947-48	Habana	Cuban	5	0	0	0	.000
Totals			125	--	32	35	.478
