= Max Wilson (baseball) =

American baseball player (1916–1977)

- Pitcher
- Born: June 3, 1916; Haw River, North Carolina, U.S.
- Died: January 2, 1977 (aged 60); Greensboro, North Carolina, U.S.
- Batted: Left Threw: Left

MLB debut
- September 6, 1940, for the Philadelphia Phillies

Last MLB appearance
- June 9, 1946, for the Washington Senators

MLB statistics
- Win–loss record: 0–1
- Earned run average: 9.15
- Strikeouts: 11
- Stats at Baseball Reference

Teams
- Philadelphia Phillies (1940); Washington Senators (1946)

Max Wilson (June 3, 1916 – January 2, 1977) was an American professional baseball pitcher who appeared in 12 games in Major League Baseball as a reliever during two partial seasons for the Philadelphia Phillies (1940) and Washington Senators (1946). Wilson was a left-hander and native of Haw River, North Carolina, who was listed as 5 feet 7 inches (1.70 m) tall and 170 pounds (77 kg). He interrupted his baseball career to serve in the United States Navy in the Pacific Theater of World War II between 1942 and 1945.

In Wilson's two MLB stints, he allowed 32 hits, 11 bases on balls and 20 earned runs in 192/3 innings pitched, dropping his only decision, on May 9, 1946, against the Detroit Tigers. He struck out 11 and compiled subpar earned run average of 9.15. However, he was a highly successful pitcher in the lower minors, putting up a 54–29 won–lost mark in three seasons in the Class B Piedmont League (1939–1941). Then, after the war, he posted seasons of 15–4 and 13–3 in the Class D Coastal Plain and Class B Carolina Leagues.

Altogether, his baseball career lasted eight seasons (1938–1941 and 1946–1949). Wilson died in Greensboro, North Carolina, at age 60 on January 2, 1977.
