= Tarboro Tars =

Defunct minor league baseball team in North Carolina

- 1937–1952; (1937–1941, 1946–1952); Tarboro, North Carolina

Minor league affiliations
- Class: Class D (1937–1952)
- League: Coastal Plain League (1937–1952)

Major league affiliations
- Team: Philadelphia Athletics (1950–1951); Boston Red Sox (1946)

Minor league titles
- League titles (2): 1940; 1948

Team data
- Name: Tarboro Tars (1940, 1946–1948, 1950, 1952); Tarboro A's (1951); Tarboro Athletics (1949); Tarboro Orioles (1941); Tarboro Serpents / Goobers (1939); Tarboro Serpents (1938); Tarboro Combs (1937)
- Ballpark: Municipal Park (1946–1952); Bryan Park (1937–1941)

Tarboro Tars was the primary name of a minor league baseball team based in Tarboro, North Carolina. The team competed in the Coastal Plain League from 1937 to 1941 and from 1946 to 1952. The team used several other nicknames during its history, and had brief affiliations with the Boston Red Sox and Philadelphia Athletics of Major League Baseball.

In the team's 12 seasons of play, it qualified for the postseason five times, advanced to the league championship series three times (1937, 1940, and 1948), and won the championship twice (1940 and 1948).

Tarboro had previously fielded minor league teams in 1900 and 1901, and for part of the 1921 season when the Petersburg Goobers relocated to Tarboro from Petersburg, Virginia, in early August.

== Notable players ==
Several players with Tarboro also made appearances in Major League Baseball:

- 1937: Soup Campbell, Snake Henry
- 1938: Campbell, Henry, Buster Maynard
- 1939: Bob Allen, Bill Donovan
- 1940: Hank Schenz, Bill Steinecke
- 1941: Bob Hooper, Ray Murray, Frankie Zak
- 1946: —
- 1947: Otey Clark
- 1948: Jake Daniel
- 1949: Joe Antolick, Bob Zick
- 1950: Antolick, Zick
- 1951: Eric Mackenzie, Joe Rullo
- 1952: —

== Results by season ==
Season	Nickname†	Affiliation	Record (win %)	Finish	Manager	Playoffs (games)	Attendance	Ref.
1937	Combs	—	53–42 (.558)	3rd of 8	Snake Henry	defeated Williamston Martins (3–0) lost to Snow Hill Hill Billies (1–4)	unknown	
1938	Serpents	—	60–47 (.561)	2nd of 8	Snake Henry	lost to Snow Hill Hill Billies (2–4)	unknown	
1939	Serpents / Goobers	—	34–90 (.274)	8th of 8	Guy Shatzer; Fred Neisler; Larry Merville	—	unknown	
1940	Tars	—	72–51 (.585)	2nd of 8	Arthur "Cowboy" McHenry; Bill Steinecke; Wes Ratteree	defeated Goldsboro Goldbugs (4–1) defeated Kinston Eagles (4–2)	unknown	
1941	Orioles	—	44–72 (.379)	7th of 8	Thomas "Poke" Whalen	—	unknown	
1942–1945		Coastal Plain League did not operate during World War II					—	
1946	Tars	Boston Red Sox	61–65 (.484)	5th of 8	Michael Kardash; F. L. "Bull" Hamons	—	46,679	
1947	Tars	—	74–66 (.529)	3rd of 8	F. L. "Bull" Hamons	lost to Kinston Eagles (2–4)	75,281	
1948	Tars	—	87–53 (.621)	1st of 8	F. L. "Bull" Hamons	defeated Rocky Mount Leafs (4–2) defeated Kinston Eagles (4–1)	67,767	
1949	Athletics	—	68–68 (.500)	6th of 8	Joe Antolick	—	41,212	
1950	Tars	Philadelphia Athletics	67–71 (.486)	7th of 8	Joe Antolick	—	36,467	
1951	A's	Philadelphia Athletics	13–22 (.371)	‡	Joe Rullo	—	6,431	
1952	Tars	—	49–71 (.408)	7th of 8	Bill Long	—	28,439	

† Other sources list the team's 1937 nickname as Serpents, 1940 nickname as Cubs, and A's during 1948–1951.
‡ In 1951, Tarboro and the Greenville Robins withdrew from the league in early June.
