= Alton Brown (baseball) =

American baseball player (1925-2016)

- Pitcher
- Born: April 16, 1925; Norfolk, Virginia, U.S.
- Died: January 10, 2016 (aged 90); Virginia Beach, Virginia, U.S.
- Batted: Right Threw: Right

MLB debut
- April 21, 1951, for the Washington Senators

Last MLB appearance
- May 27, 1951, for the Washington Senators

MLB statistics
- Win–loss record: 0–0
- Earned run average: 9.26
- Strikeouts: 7
- Stats at Baseball Reference

Teams
- Washington Senators (1951)

Alton Leo "Deacon" Brown (April 16, 1925 – January 10, 2016) was an American right-handed Major League Baseball relief pitcher who played for the Washington Senators in 1951.

== Biography ==
Brown was born and raised in Norfolk, Virginia. Growing up, he worked the scoreboard for baseball games at Norfolk's Bain Field, but he never played baseball until he served in the army during World War II.

His service in the army started in January 1944 and finished in 1946. He made his professional debut in 1948, with the Roanoke Rapids Jays, and he spent his first three seasons with the team. He earned an 8–12 win–loss record with a 4.21 earned run average (ERA) in 36 games in the 1948 season. In 1949, he had a 16–12 record with a 3.97 ERA in 38 games. Brown had arguably the best year of his professional career in 1950, as he went 28–11 with a 2.38 ERA in 45 games, allowing 269 hits in 317 innings of work. He led the league in wins and strikeouts (204) and won the league's Most Valuable Player award.

He began the 1951 season with the Senators, making his major league debut on April 21. Brown had a 9.26 earned run average in seven big league appearances, with no decisions. He appeared in his final big league game on May 27, and was sent to the minors, where he went 5–8 with a 6.29 ERA in 22 games (16 starts) for the Chattanooga Lookouts. Brown split 1952 between the Lookouts and Richmond Colts, going 12–10. In 1953 he went 11–8 with a 2.24 ERA in 42 games (13 starts) for the Norfolk Tars. Before the 1954 season, Tars management offered Brown a contract for $250, and after negotiations, settled on a salary of $375. He split that season between the Tars and Shreveport Sports, going a combined 13–6 in 44 games. Brown played his final minor league season in 1955, splitting the year between the Columbus Foxes and San Antonio Missions, finishing with a combined 2–3 mark. Overall, he went 109–76 in 320 minor league games.

Brown managed the Norfolk Tars for part of the 1955 season. After leaving baseball, Brown was a longshoreman on the Norfolk docks. After 20 years as a longshoreman, he suffered disabling injuries in a fall onto a barge. He died at the age of 90 in 2016.
