= Chuck Stevens =

American baseball player (1918–2018)

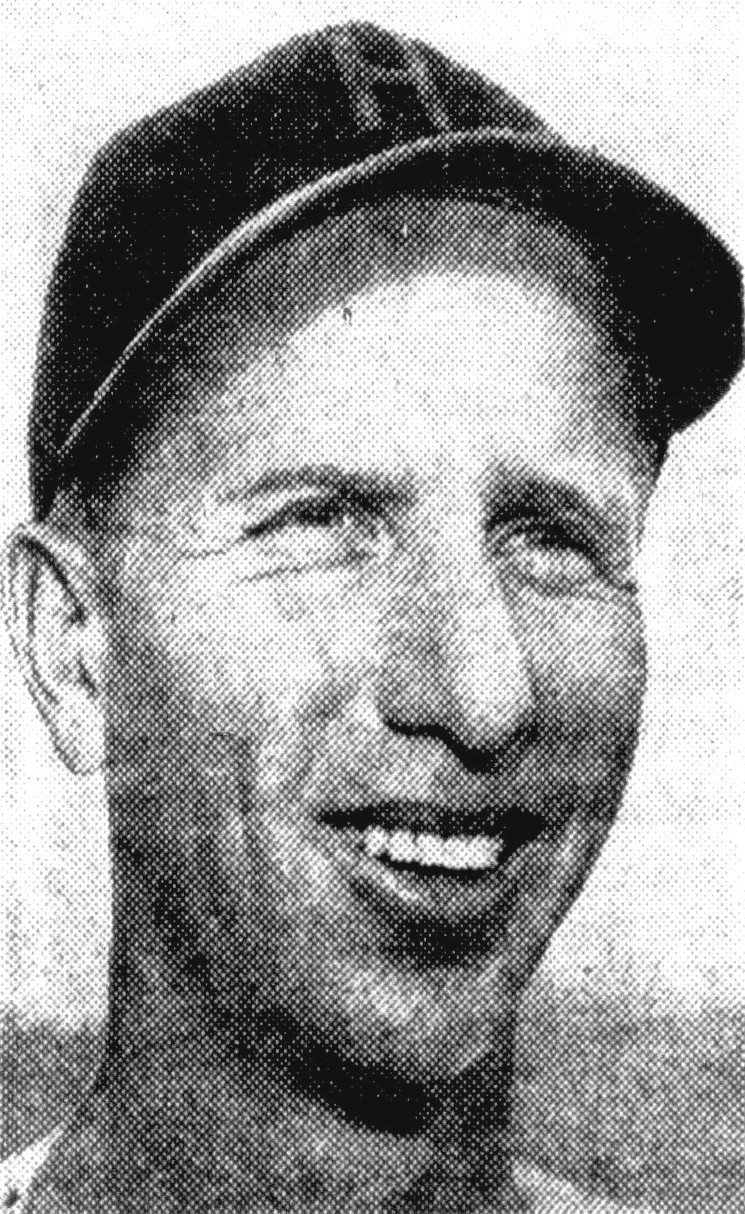
- Stevens, circa 1950
- First baseman
- Born: July 10, 1918; Van Houten, New Mexico, U.S.
- Died: May 28, 2018 (aged 99); Garden Grove, California, U.S.
- Batted: Switch Threw: Left

MLB debut
- September 16, 1941, for the St. Louis Browns

Last MLB appearance
- July 25, 1948, for the St. Louis Browns

MLB statistics
- Batting average: .251
- Home runs: 4
- Runs batted in: 55
- Stats at Baseball Reference

Teams
- St. Louis Browns (1941, 1946, 1948)

Charles Augustus Stevens Jr. (July 10, 1918 – May 28, 2018) was an American professional baseball player in Major League Baseball (MLB).

== Biography ==
=== Early years ===
Charles Stevens was born July 10, 1918, in Van Houten, New Mexico, near the Colorado border. He was one of four children of cattle breeder Charles Stevens Sr. and his wife Ann. A few years later they moved to Long Beach in order to be able to give their children a better education. As a child, Stevens played baseball and basketball, was fond of music and tap danced. With the whole family, they often attended the games of the Los Angeles Angels Pacific Coast League team. During his high school years and on the American Legion junior team, he played alongside future Major League Baseball stars Vern Stephens, Bob Lemon, and Bobby Sturgeon.

=== Baseball career ===
In 1937, Stevens graduated from Long Beach Polytechnic High School and entered the University of California, Berkeley, where he briefly studied as a dentist. He soon signed with the St. Louis Browns with the goal of being promoted to Major League Baseball in four years. The first team in his professional career was the Williamston Martins of North Carolina. In the D League, Stevens played 97 games, batting 28.8%. Being left-handed, from childhood he was used to hitting from the right side. In 1938, he changed his stance at the request of the Browns coaches and later hit only from the left. That season, Stevens played for the Johnstown Johnnies in the C-League, with a batting efficiency of 29.0% .

In early 1939, he was transferred to the Springfield Browns. With the team, Stevens won the Tri-I League Championship and had a slugging rate of 31.6%. He played the following season in the Texas League with the San Antonio Missions, where he hit worse, but played well on defense and moved around the bases. At the end of 1940, he was called to the first team of St. Louis for the first time, but he did not enter the field. Stevens played virtually the entire 1941 championship with Toledo Mud Hens, earning a slugging rate of 29.0% in 145 matches played. In September, he made his debut for St. Louis, playing in four games. In 1942 he again played for Toledo.

After the end of the 1942 season, Stevens was called up for military service and posted to the United States Air Force. At first he was in California, and then was sent to the Pacific theater of operations, where he participated in operations to rescue downed pilots in Tinian, Guam and Okinawa. Even during his service, he did not give up baseball, playing for teams of military bases. After demobilization, Stevens resumed his sports career. In 1946, he was the Browns' first baseman, playing in 122 regular season games with a slugging rate of 24.8%.

In 1947, the club sent him to Toledo. Browns coaches later tried to bring him back, but that would have required going through a waiver draft. As a result, he had to spend the entire year in the minor leagues, where, after 141 games, his offensive efficiency was 27.9%. Returning to St. Louis in 1948, he played 85 games, after which they tried to send him to San Antonio. Stevens refused and left for Long Beach, and later asked the club to sell him to the Hollywood Stars. After making the transition, he managed to play another 38 games for the new team.

Stevens played with the Stars for the next six years. Three times he won the Pacific Coast League championship with the team. In parallel with his sports career, he starred in the sports films The Stratton Story and The Winning Team. In the second one of his partners was Ronald Reagan. Stevens was one of the team's most consistent hitters, playing well on defense and being a leader on the field and in the locker room. He left the Stars in 1954, losing the fight for a spot with Dale Long.. He spent the next season and a half with the San Francisco Seals before buying out his contract and becoming the player-coach of the Amarillo Gold Sox. Under him, the team reached the final series of the Western League, and Stevens himself received the Manager of the Year award. After that, he was considered as a contender for the position of head coach of the St. Louis Browns, but he did not want to leave his family for a long time. The last season of his career was the 1957 season, during which Stevens was the player-coach of the Sacramento Solons.

=== Post baseball career ===
After finishing playing, Stevens returned to Long Beach. He first worked for an oil well service company, and in 1960 accepted an offer to be secretary of the Professional Baseball Players Association of America. This organization brought together former baseball players, coaches and umpires, helping those in need. Stevens took part in the modernization of the structure of the Association, improvement of its work, bringing documentation in line with the law. In 1982, when the Association organized the All-Star game among veterans, Stevens personally engaged in the selection of players in the team, and then led the American League team. He held the post of secretary of the organization until 1998, after which he retired. He spent the rest of his life in Long Beach.

Chuck Stevens died on May 28, 2018 at the age of 99. At the time of his death, he was the oldest living Major League Baseball player.

== See also ==
- 1948 Cleveland Indians season

Records
Preceded by Bobby Doerr	Oldest recognized verified living baseball player November 13, 2017 – May 28, 2018	Succeeded by Fred Caligiuri
