= Roanoke Rapids Jays =

The Roanoke Rapids Jays were a Coastal Plain League baseball team based in Roanoke Rapids, North Carolina, USA that existed from 1947 to 1952. They were affiliated with the Washington Senators from 1951 to 1952.

Notable players include Ted Abernathy and Stu Martin.
