= Ted Abernathy =

American baseball player (1933–2004)

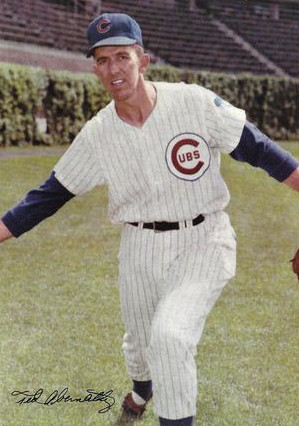
- Abernathy with the Chicago Cubs in 1969
- Pitcher
- Born: March 6, 1933; Stanley, North Carolina, U.S.
- Died: December 16, 2004 (aged 71); Gastonia, North Carolina, U.S.
- Batted: Right Threw: Right

MLB debut
- April 13, 1955, for the Washington Senators

Last MLB appearance
- September 30, 1972, for the Kansas City Royals

MLB statistics
- Win–loss record: 63–69
- Earned run average: 3.46
- Strikeouts: 765
- Saves: 149
- Stats at Baseball Reference

Teams
- Washington Senators (1955–1957, 1960); Cleveland Indians (1963–1964); Chicago Cubs (1965–1966); Atlanta Braves (1966); Cincinnati Reds (1967–1968); Chicago Cubs (1969–1970); St. Louis Cardinals (1970); Kansas City Royals (1970–1972)

Ted Wade Abernathy (March 6, 1933 – December 16, 2004) was an American professional baseball player and right-handed pitcher. He appeared in 681 games in Major League Baseball (MLB), 647 as a relief pitcher, for seven different clubs over all or parts of 14 seasons between 1955 and 1972, amassed 148 saves, and twice (1965, 1967) led the National League (NL) in that category. He batted and threw right-handed, stood 6 feet 4 inches (1.93 m) tall, and weighed 215 pounds (98 kg).

Abernathy was a member of the Washington Senators (1955–57, 1960), Cleveland Indians (1963–64), Chicago Cubs (1965–66, 1969–70), Atlanta Braves (1966), Cincinnati Reds (1967–68), St. Louis Cardinals (1970) and Kansas City Royals (1970–72). He compiled a 63–69 record with 765 strikeouts and a 3.46 ERA in 1,1472/3 innings pitched. He gave up 1,010 hits and permitted 592 bases on balls.

== Early life ==
A native of Stanley, North Carolina, Abernathy was born on March 6, 1933, to Wade and Genora (McGinnis) Abernathy. He graduated from Stanley High School in 1951, where he played on the baseball team. As a high school freshman Abernathy injured his arm, tearing two shoulder muscles. This led him to change his pitching motion from an overhead delivery to a sidearm pitching style.

He led his high school to its first conference baseball title. He also played for Gastonia in American Legion baseball, leading that team to a state title and an appearance in the first national Legion tournament.

In 1953 he married Margie Clemmer. The couple had two sons, Ted Jr. and Todd.

== Professional baseball career ==
=== Washington Senators ===
Abernathy signed as an amateur free agent with the Senators in 1952.

He was assigned to the Class-D Roanoke Rapids Jays in 1952, where he had a 20–13 won–loss record, a 1.69 earned run average (ERA), with 23 complete games and six shutouts. In 1953, he was promoted to the Double-A Chattanooga Lookouts, where he played in only seven games, with a 4–1 record and another stellar ERA (1.56) in 52 innings pitched.

During the Korean War, Abernathy was drafted into the U.S. Army, serving with medics, driving an ambulance and repairing vehicles. He served at Fort McPherson, Georgia. He missed most of the 1953 season, and all of the 1954 season. Abernathy was discharged as a corporal in time to join the Senators for 1955 spring training.

Abernathy made his Major League debut for the American League (AL) Senators at age 22 on April 13, 1955, in 19–1 loss to the New York Yankees at Yankee Stadium. In the fourth inning, Abernathy relieved Mickey McDermott and struck out Andy Carey before giving up a home run to Mickey Mantle followed by a groundout by Yogi Berra. He stayed with the Senators all of 1955, with a 5–9 record and 5.96 ERA, starting 14 of the 40 games in which he appeared. He was assigned to the Triple-A Louisville Colonels in the American Association for the majority of 1956, going 12–16 with a 3.90 ERA in 31 games as a starting pitcher, striking out 212 batters in 231 innings pitched. He made the American Association All-Star team.

The Senators called him up at the end of the 1956 season, and he pitched in five games for the Senators, four as a starter. In late September, he suffered a serious arm injury, that would affect him with arm pain for the next three seasons. He was with the Senators for the 1957 season, starting 16 of 26 games in which he appeared, with a 2–10 record and 6.78 ERA. This was the last season he ever started an MLB game. Every one of his 34 MLB starting pitcher assignments came with the 1955–57 Senators, a struggling, second-division team in the American League. Abernathy threw seven complete games and two shutouts as a starter, but won only eight of 30 decisions during that three-year period.

In 1958, Abernathy played in the Senators minor league system, going 9–9, with a 4.71 ERA. In 1959, he pitched only three innings of minor league baseball, before undergoing therapy on his arm, and then finally elbow surgery. His surgeon told Abernathy it would take three years to fully recover. He returned in 1960 with a new pitching delivery, dropping his sidearm motion down even further to an underhand style, known as submarine pitching, to take pressure off of his arm. He had copied this style of pitching from Senators teammate Dick Hyde.

Other than pitching three innings for the Senators in 1960, who released him on May 17, 1960, he split the season between the Milwaukee Braves affiliated Double-A Austin Senators and Triple-A Louisville (now also affiliated with the Milwaukee Braves). Combined, he was able to pitch in 33 games, all in relief, with a 2.44 ERA.

=== Cleveland Indians and Chicago Cubs ===
At 28-years old, he started the 1961 season with the Braves' Triple-A Vancouver Mounties, but his contract rights were sold to the Cleveland Indians in July, finishing out the season with the Triple-A Salt Lake City Bees. In 1962, he pitched 45 games in relief for the Triple-A Jacksonville Suns, with a 5–2 record and 1.88 ERA. At 30-years old, he began the 1963 season with the Suns, pitching 26 innings in 14 games, with a 2–1 record and phenomenal 0.35 ERA. This was the last time he would pitch in the minor leagues until the very end of his career in 1973.

Abernathy was called up to the Indians at the end of May 1963. He appeared in 43 games in relief, with 12 saves, a 7–2 record and 2.88 ERA. His performance fell off significantly in 1964, and his rights were sold to the Chicago Cubs at the beginning of the 1965 season. In 1965, Abernathy recorded a major league-leading 31 saves (again for a second-division team), along with 104 strikeouts and a 2.57 ERA. He also led all major league pitchers in games pitched (84) and games finished (62). The 84 games pitched broke a major league record at the time.

In 1965, he was honored with The Sporting News NL Fireman of the Year Award. After a poor start to the 1966 season, however, the Cubs traded him in late May to the Atlanta Braves for Lee Thomas.

=== Atlanta Braves, Cincinnati Reds, Cubs ===
In 1966, he pitched in relief 38 times for the Braves, with a 4–4 record, 3.86 ERA and only four saves. After the season ended, the Braves exposed him in the Rule 5 draft, and he was claimed by the Cincinnati Reds.

Abernathy had his career best season in 1967 with the Reds. He had 28 saves, 88 strikeouts, and a 1.27 ERA, with a 6–3 record in 106.1 innings pitched. His 28 saves led all major league pitchers, as did his 61 games finished. He tied with Ron Perranoski for the National League lead in games played by a pitcher (70). For major league seasons where he pitched over 31 innings, he averaged career bests with 7.4 strikeouts per nine innings, 3.5 bases on balls per nine innings, and a minuscule .1 home runs per nine innings (giving up only one home run all season).

He again won The Sportings News NL Fireman of the Year Award. Abernathy came in 20th in NL most valuable player voting. In a player poll conducted by the Newspaper Enterprise Association (NEA) in 1967, the players themselves selected Abernathy as the relief pitcher on the first annual All-Players All-Star Baseball Team.

In 1968 with the Reds, Abernathy won 10 games with 13 saves, and had a 2.46 ERA. He led the NL in pitching appearances with 78. Abernathy believed he had to pitch frequently to be effective, and did not think he was used enough in the second half of the season, as Clay Carroll became the primary relief pitcher for the Reds. Before the start of the 1969 season, he was traded to the Cubs for Ken Myette, Bill Plummer and Clarence Jones. In 1969, he pitched in 56 games for the Cubs, with a 4–3 record, 3.16 ERA and three saves; but the team's primary closer was Phil Regan, who finished 49 games to Abernathy's 20, and had 17 saves.

=== Final playing years ===
In late May 1970, the Cubs traded Abernathy to the St. Louis Cardinals for Phil Gagliano. A little over one month later, the Cardinals traded Abernathy to the Kansas City Royals for Chris Zachary. Combined for all three teams in 1970, Abernathy had a 10–3 record, and a 2.60 ERA with 14 saves in 58 games pitched in relief. He pitched well in his final two major league seasons, with his third best career season in saves in 1971 (23), and ERAs of 2.56 in 63 games in 1971 and 1.70 in 45 games in 1972.

He was the oldest player in the AL in 1972, and the only submarine pitcher in either league. He did not encourage younger players to adopt his style, which is something he did out of necessity because of his injury history. At 40-years old, after being released by the Royals, Abernathy ended his professional career in 1973 with the Wilson Pennants of the Carolina League. He had been perplexed by his release because of his low ERA in 1972, assuming it was because of his age, and even though he had been looking into other work, had not quite gotten baseball out of his system. His career ended just a few miles from where it had started in Roanoke Rapids in 1952.

=== Career ===
In Abernathy's 14-year major league career, he pitched in 681 games (34 starts), with a 63–69 record and 149 saves in 1,148.1 innings pitched. His ERA was 3.46, and he averaged .5 home runs per nine innings, 4.6 bases on balls per nine innings, and 6.0 strikeouts per nine innings. He had a 16.6 WAR (wins above replacement).

== Personal life ==
After retiring from the game, Abernathy worked at Summey Building Systems in Dallas, North Carolina, and later worked with his son at his landscaping business, Todd Abernathy Landscaping, and was a member of the First United Methodist Church of Dallas. He enjoyed playing softball and tinkering with old cars and was active in several organizations including the Masonic Lodge, the Shriners and Major League Baseball's alumni society.

== Final years and death ==
During his later years, Abernathy suffered from Alzheimer's disease and lived at the Belaire Health Care Center in Gastonia, North Carolina. Ted Abernathy died at age 71 on December 16, 2004, in Gastonia. He is interred at the Garden of Four Seasons in Gaston Memorial Park, Gastonia, North Carolina.

== See also ==
- List of Major League Baseball annual saves leaders
