= Steve Collins (baseball) =

American baseball player and manager (born 1918)

- Shortstop/Manager
- Born: 1918
- Bats: Right Throws: Unknown

Stephen C. Collins was an American minor league baseball player-manager.

Infielder Collins spent eleven seasons in the minor leagues including a three-year stint as the player-manager for the Kinston Eagles of the Coastal Plain League (1947–1949). At the time, the Eagles were an affiliate of the Atlanta Crackers. Collins' squads were able to capture the Coastal Plain League crown in 1947 and made it to the championship series in the other two years. Contributing greatly to these teams was Collins himself who hit .353 with 91 RBI in 1947 and .311 with 90 RBI in 1948. He was named to the Coastal Plain League All-Star team for each of those seasons.

== Sources ==
- Articles
- The Professional Baseball Players Database 5.0
- Gaunt, Robert (1997). We Would Have Played Forever: The Story of the Coastal Plain Baseball League. Baseball America, Inc. ISBN 0-945164-02-5.
