= Wes Livengood =

American baseball player, scout, and manager (1910–1996)

- Pitcher
- Born: July 18, 1910; Salisbury, North Carolina, U.S.
- Died: September 2, 1996 (aged 86); Winston-Salem, North Carolina, U.S.
- Batted: Right Threw: Right

MLB debut
- May 30, 1939, for the Cincinnati Reds

Last MLB appearance
- July 2, 1939, for the Cincinnati Reds

MLB statistics
- Win–loss record: 0–0
- Earned run average: 9.53
- Strikeouts: 4
- Innings pitched: 5 2/3
- Stats at Baseball Reference

Teams
- Cincinnati Reds (1939)

Wesley Amos Livengood (July 18, 1910 – September 2, 1996) was an American professional baseball player, scout and manager, including some time spent as a minor league player-manager. A right-handed pitcher born in Salisbury, North Carolina, he stood 6 feet 2 inches (1.88 m) tall and weighed 172 pounds (78 kg).

Livengood attended Duke University and entered pro ball in 1932. He then spent 1933–36 out of organized baseball before returning to the minor leagues in 1937. Livengood broke into the big leagues with the Cincinnati Reds in 1939. He pitched a total of 5 2/3 innings for Cincinnati over five games as a reliever during the Reds' pennant-winning 1939 season.

He returned to the minors making stops in Knoxville, Durham, Portsmouth, and Milwaukee. He served in the Navy for two years during World War II where, among other things, he played baseball at Pearl Harbor.

After the war Livengood played more minor league ball through the 1952 season and sometimes served as the a player-manager, as he did for Kinston in 1951.

His best year was in 1938 when he went 21–9 with an ERA of 3.06 for the Class D Bassett Furnituremakers. Another outstanding campaign was 1943 when he went 18–10 for Milwaukee.

After his playing days were over, he managed in the minors and scouted for the Philadelphia Phillies for thirty years, where he discovered and/or signed players such as Don Cardwell, Jimmie Coker, and Dickie Noles.

He also owned and operated Carolinas Men's Shop and, later, the Livengood Furniture Company. He died at age 86 and is buried at Salem Cemetery in Winston-Salem.
