= Sparta, Virginia =

Unincorporated community in Virginia, United States

- Unincorporated community
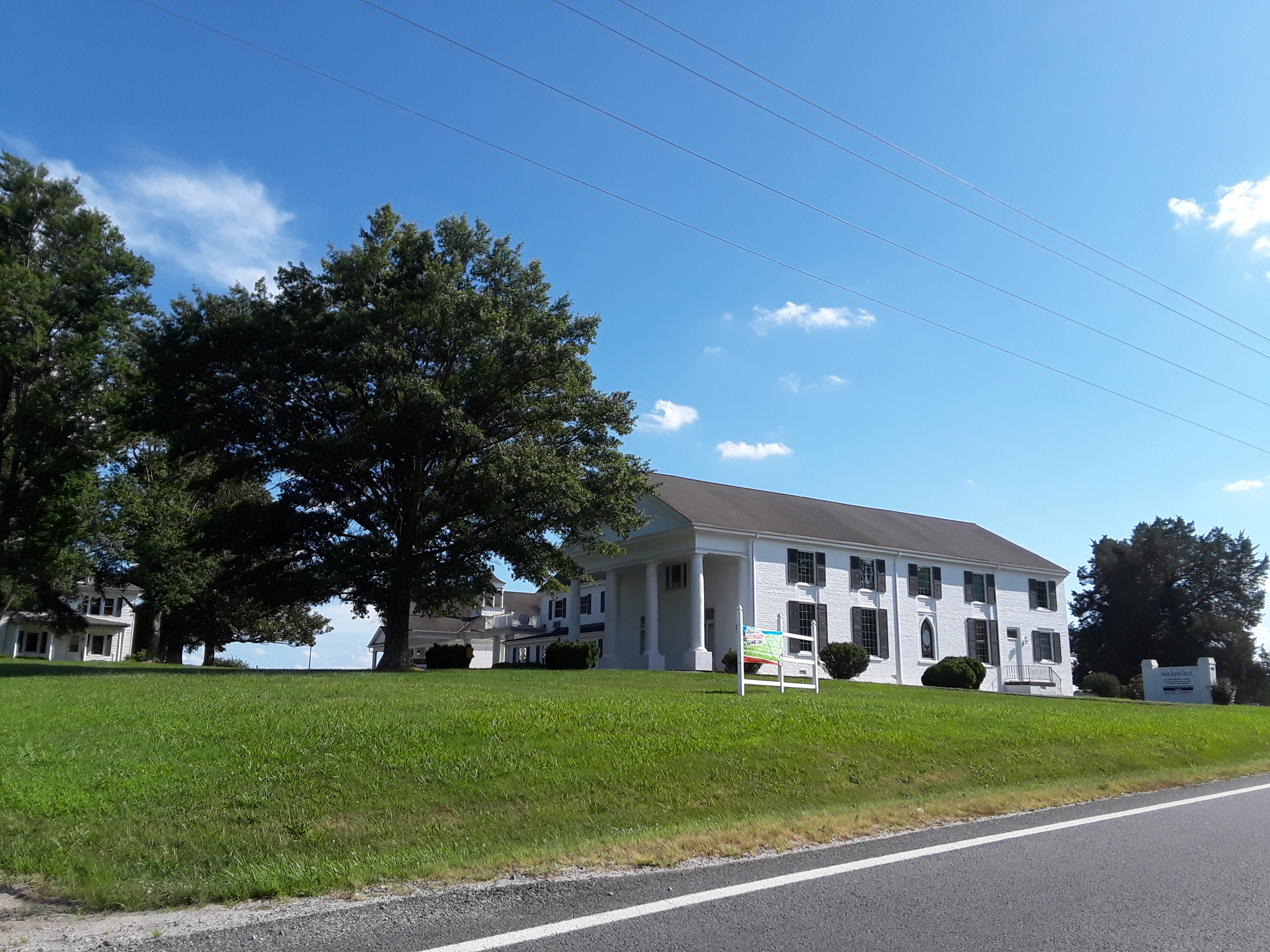
- Salem Baptist Church, Sparta, July 2018

- Location within Virginia Location within the United States
- Coordinates: 37°59′30″N 77°13′49″W
- Country: United States
- State: Virginia
- County: Caroline
- Elevation: 171 ft (52 m)
- Time zone: UTC−5 (Eastern (EST))
  - Summer (DST): UTC−4 (EDT)
- ZIP code: 22552
- Area code: 804
- GNIS feature ID: 1477776

Sparta is an unincorporated community in Caroline County, in the U.S. state of Virginia. The Sparta area code is 804.
