= Bunky Stewart =

American baseball player (1931-2007)

- Pitcher
- Born: January 7, 1931; Craven County, North Carolina, U.S.
- Died: October 3, 2007 (aged 76); Wilmington, North Carolina, U.S.
- Batted: Left Threw: Left

MLB debut
- May 4, 1952, for the Washington Senators

Last MLB appearance
- September 15, 1956, for the Washington Senators

MLB statistics
- Win–loss record: 5–11
- Earned run average: 6.01
- Strikeouts: 77
- Stats at Baseball Reference

Teams
- Washington Senators (1952–1956)

Veston Goff "Bunky" Stewart (January 7, 1931 – October 3, 2007) was an American professional baseball player, a pitcher for the Washington Senators between 1952 and 1956. He accumulated five wins, eleven losses, and three saves over 72 games pitched. The 6 ft (1.8 m), 155 lb (70 kg) left-hander was born in Jasper, Craven County, North Carolina, and attended East Carolina University.

Before debuting in the Major League, he played for the New Bern Bears of the Coastal Plain League. He played parts of four more seasons with the Senators, though he only played regularly in 1954 (29 games) and 1956 (33 games). In his final season, Stewart pitched 105 innings, winning five games, and saving two. He also hit .250 with 2 RBIs in 28 at bats in '56.

After his playing days, he worked in retail and in real estate. He died on October 3, 2007, in Wilmington, North Carolina.
