= Coastal Plain League (semi pro) =

US semi-professional baseball

The original Coastal Plain League was a semi-professional baseball circuit that operated in North Carolina from 1934 to 1935. The league's teams were composed primarily of college ballplayers, very similar to the current Coastal Plain League which was structured in 1997.

Teams of the cities of Ayden, Kinston, Greenville, New Bern, Snow Hill and Tarboro were represented in the league in 1934. Teams from Goldsboro and Williamston were added in 1935.

In the inaugural season, the Snow Hill club captured the regular season pennant with a 62–36 record. In the postseason they defeated New Bern in the first round and then clinched the champion trophy by defeating Tarboro, four games to one. In 1935, New Bern completed a four-game revenge sweep over Snow Hill to win the championship.

By 1937 the league decided to join organized baseball to become a professional baseball circuit. The league was assigned the classification of D, the lowest level of professional baseball, while preserving its name.
