= Joe Antolick =

American baseball player (1916-2002)

- Catcher
- Born: April 11, 1916; Hokendauqua, Pennsylvania, U.S.
- Died: June 25, 2002 (aged 86); Catasauqua, Pennsylvania, U.S.
- Batted: Right Threw: Right

MLB debut
- September 20, 1944, for the Philadelphia Phillies

Last MLB appearance
- September 26, 1944, for the Philadelphia Phillies

MLB statistics
- Batting average: .333
- Hits: 2
- Runs batted in: 0
- Stats at Baseball Reference

Teams
- Philadelphia Phillies (1944)

Joseph Antolick (April 11, 1916 – June 25, 2002) was an American professional baseball catcher and manager, who played in Major League Baseball (MLB) for the Philadelphia Phillies. He appeared in four games, in 1944, as a 28-year-old rookie. During his playing days, Antolick stood 6 feet (1.83 m) tall, weighing 185 pounds (84 kg); he batted and threw right-handed.

Antolick is one of many ballplayers who only appeared in the Majors during World War II. His pro career began in 1938 and extended through 1951, but the highest minor league level he reached was Class A (roughly equivalent to Double-A today) with the Utica Blue Sox of the Eastern League in 1945. A season earlier, he was recalled by the Phillies after the 1944 minor league season—which he spent with the Class B Wilmington Blue Rocks—for his big-league debut on September 20, 1944, in a home game against the Cincinnati Reds at Shibe Park. Facing ace right-hander Bucky Walters as a pinch hitter, he grounded out, Walters to first baseman Frank McCormick. Five days later, he started his only MLB game at catcher and collected his first hit, a single off the Chicago Cubs' Charlie Gassaway. Then, the following day, he relieved starting catcher Johnny Peacock and singled in his only at bat off Hank Wyse, one of only four Phillies' hits in a 15–0 loss.

In four games he was 2-for-6 (.333) with a walk and one run scored. In his three appearances as a catcher he handled 10 chances without making an error and participated in one double play.

From 1946–51, Antolick was a player-manager in the low minors. He died at the age of 86 in Catasauqua, Pennsylvania.
