= Tal Abernathy =

American baseball player (1921–2001)

- Pitcher
- Born: October 30, 1921; Bynum, North Carolina, U.S.
- Died: November 16, 2001 (aged 80); Charlotte, North Carolina, U.S.
- Batted: Right Threw: Left

MLB debut
- September 19, 1942, for the Philadelphia Athletics

Last MLB appearance
- April 29, 1944, for the Philadelphia Athletics

MLB statistics
- Win–loss record: 0–3
- Earned run average: 11.07
- Strikeouts: 13
- Stats at Baseball Reference

Teams
- Philadelphia Athletics (1942–1944)

Talmadge Lafayette Abernathy (October 30, 1921 – November 16, 2001), also known as Tal Abernathy, was an American professional baseball player whose playing career spanned eight seasons, including parts of three in Major League Baseball with the Philadelphia Athletics (1942–1944). Abernathy was a pitcher. Over his major league career, he went 0–3 with an 11.07 earned run average (ERA), one complete game and 13 strikeouts in seven games, two starts. Abernathy batted right-handed and threw right-handed.

Abernathy also played in the minor leagues. Over his career in the minors, Abernathy played with the Class-B Wilmington Blue Rocks (1942–1943); Class-A1, and later Double-A, Memphis Chickasaws (1944–1947); the Class-C Leaksville-Draper-Spray Triplets (1947); the Class-C Reidsville Luckies (1948); the Class-C, and later Class-B, Burlington Bees (1948–1949); and the Class-B Greensboro Patriots (1949). During his minor league career, Abernathy went 79–67 with a 3.39 ERA in 238 games. Abernathy also managed two minor league teams during the 1948 season.

== Amateur career ==
Abernathy attended Elon University from 1939 to 1941. In 1939, both Abernathy and future Major League Baseball player Ed Sauer attended Elon University. In October 1974, Abernathy was inducted into the Elon University Sports Hall of Fame, recognized because of his contribution as an athlete at the college.

Abernathy was selected as part of the United States national baseball team that represented the country at the 1941 Amateur World Series, held in Havana, Cuba. The U.S. team finished sixth in the tournament.

== Professional career ==
=== Philadelphia Athletics ===
Before the 1942 season, Abernathy was signed by the Philadelphia Athletics as an amateur free agent. Abernathy started his first professional season in 1942 with the Class-B Wilmington Blue Rocks. With the Blue Rocks, Abernathy went 8–6 with a 2.61 earned run average (ERA) in 27 games. He was a member of the Blue Rocks when they won the Interstate League pennant. During that season, Abernathy was called up to the Athletics at the major league level. He made his debut on September 19, 1942, against the Washington Senators. In what would be his only game that season, Abernathy pitched 2 2/3 innings and gave up three runs, all earned. On February 23, 1943, Abernathy re-signed with the Athletics.

Abernathy participated in spring training with the Athletics during the 1943 season. In May, Abernathy was cut from the Athletics roster after giving up seven earned runs, all earned, in one inning pitched.

Abernathy was then assigned to the Class-B Wilmington Blue Rocks where he went 16–10 with a 3.16 ERA in 38 games. He was tied for sixth in the Interstate League in wins. Abernathy made his return to the Athletics roster in September and finished the season with a record of 0–3 with a 12.89 ERA, one complete game and 10 strikeouts in five games, two starts. Abernathy spent what would prove to be his final season in the majors with the Athletics in 1944. In only one game, Abernathy gave up one earned run in one inning pitched.

=== Later career ===
After pitching one game with the Philadelphia Athletics in 1944, Abernathy started playing in the St. Louis Browns organization with the Class-A1 Memphis Chickasaws of the Southern Association. He went 6–6 with a 3.55 ERA in 23 games, 11 starts with the Chickasaws that season. In 1945, Abernathy continued playing with the Memphis Chickasaws. That season, he went 8–10 with a 3.65 ERA in 26 games, 20 starts. Abernathy was tied for first on Memphis in losses in 1945.

During the 1946 season, still a member of the Memphis Chickasaws who were now redefined as a Double-A level team, Abernathy went 3–3 with a 3.48 ERA in nine games, seven starts. In 1947, Abernathy played for both the Double-A Memphis Chickasaws and the Class-C Leaksville-Draper-Spray Triplets. With the Chickasaws, he went 1–0 in two games. Abernathy later joined the Triplets where he went 14–12 with a 3.18 ERA in 39 games. He led the Leaksville-Draper-Spray team in wins.

During the 1948 season, Abernathy made his managerial debut as the player-manager of two Carolina League teams; the Burlington Bees and the Reidsville Luckies. Combined between the two Class-C level teams, Abernathy went 13–10 with a 3.57 ERA in 37 games. During his tenure with the Bees, Abernathy was fined for throwing a baseball out of the ball park after getting upset over a call made by the umpire. After the incident, Abernathy apologized to his teammates and promised them that if he was ever fined again, he would buy them all a steak.

In 1949, Abernathy's final season in professional baseball, he split the season between the Class-B Burlington Bees and the Class-B Greensboro Patriots, both of the Carolina League. In 37 combined games, Abernathy went 10–10 with a 4.18 ERA.
