= Snake Henry =

American baseball player

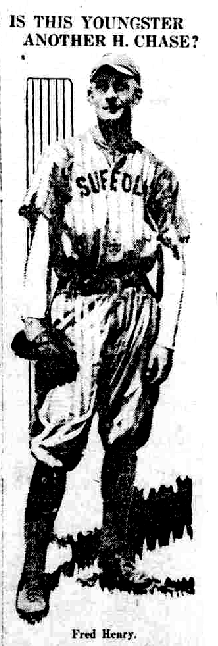
- Snake Henry with a minor league team, circa 1917.
- First baseman
- Born: July 19, 1895; Waynesville, North Carolina, U.S.
- Died: October 12, 1987 (aged 92); Wendell, North Carolina, U.S.
- Batted: Left Threw: Left

MLB debut
- September 15, 1922, for the Boston Braves

Last MLB appearance
- May 14, 1923, for the Boston Braves

MLB statistics
- Batting average: .187
- Home runs: 0
- Runs batted in: 7
- Stats at Baseball Reference

Teams
- Boston Braves (1922–1923)

Frederick Marshall "Snake" Henry (July 19, 1895 – October 12, 1987) was an American Major League Baseball first baseman and minor league manager.

Henry played in a total of twenty nine games for the Boston Braves during the 1922 and 1923 seasons. He compiled a .187 batting average with four doubles, one triple, and seven runs batted in.

Henry's greatest achievements in baseball were in the minor leagues where he compiled 3384 career hits (fifth all time in minor league history), 675 doubles, and 200 triples (both ranking him second all time).

He also saw service as a minor league manager including an explosive stint with the Kinston Eagles in 1939. During that year, Henry physically attacked an umpire on the field after a close play at third. The assault included a knee to the groin, shoving and much swearing. It precipitated a near riot from the fans, and a one-year suspension for Henry.

== Sources ==
- Career statistics from Baseball Reference · Baseball Reference (Minors) · Retrosheet · Baseball Almanac
- Kinston history page
- Gaunt, Robert (1997). We Would Have Played Forever: The Story of the Coastal Plain Baseball League. Baseball America, Inc. ISBN 0-945164-02-5.
