= Kinston Eagles (Coastal Plain League) =

- 1937–1952; Kinston, North Carolina

Minor league affiliations
- Previous classes: D (1937–1941, 1946–1952); semipro (1934–1936)
- Previous leagues: Coastal Plain League (1934–1941, 1946–1952)

Major league affiliations
- Previous teams: Detroit Tigers (1952); Boston Red Sox (1950); St. Louis Cardinals (1937–1939)

Minor league titles
- League titles: 1935, 1947

Team data
- Name: Kinston Eagles
- Ballpark: Grainger Stadium (1949–1952); Grainger Park (1934–1941, 1946–1948)

The Kinston Eagles were a Minor League Baseball team of the Coastal Plain League. They were located in Kinston, North Carolina. The team played its home games at Grainger Stadium, which opened in 1949 and holds 4,100 fans. Prior to that they played in Grainger Park.

The Eagles won the CPL Championship in 1947 as an affiliate of the Atlanta Crackers.

== History ==
=== Coastal Plain League ===
The Great Depression took a great toll on the minor leagues, with only thirteen teams operating across the U.S. at a 1933 low point. Like most, Kinston sat out the first few years of the Great Depression but reentered play for the 1934 season in the semi-professional Coastal Plain League. By 1937 the circuit had become a fully professional, Class D league as ranked by the National Association. The city remained in the Coastal Plain League continuously until it was disbanded after 1952. As a member of this affiliation, Kinston saw many playoff appearances and won league championships in 1935 and 1947. Among the superior talent during this period was a young player named Charlie "King Kong" Keller who is listed as among the top forty major league players of all-time in terms of on-base percentage (.410).

== Grainger Stadium ==
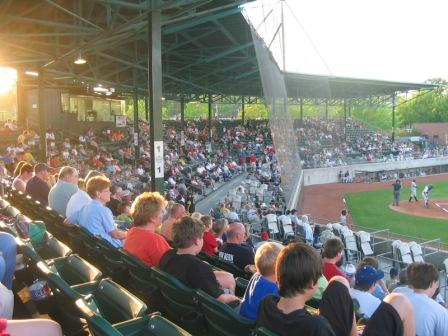
Grainger Grandstand, 2006.

From 1949 on, the Kinston Eagles played their home games at Grainger Stadium located at 400 East Grainger Avenue in Kinston. The original structure was built by architect John J. Rowland in 1949 at a cost of $170,000 inclusive of everything except the land. $150,000 of the money was raised by bond issue. A dedicatory plaque identifies the structure as "Municipal Stadium", but it has been called Grainger Stadium since it was first built.

== Season-by-season results ==
Year	Name	League	Level	Affiliation	Record	Manager	Playoffs
1934	Eagles	Coastal Plain	semipro		36–24	Bunn Hearn	Lost League Finals
1935	Eagles	Coastal Plain	semipro		41–26	Bunn Hearn	League Champs
1936	Eagles	Coastal Plain	semipro		40–32	Herschel Caldwell	Lost League Finals
1937	Eagles	Coastal Plain	D	St. Louis Cardinals	32–65	Bess/Taylor	
1938	Eagles	Coastal Plain	D	St. Louis Cardinals	60–50	Tommy West	Lost in 1st round
1939	Eagles	Coastal Plain	D	St. Louis Cardinals	65–59	Henry/Lucas/Herring	Lost League Finals
1940	Eagles	Coastal Plain	D		63–60	Sothern/Aerette	Lost League Finals
1941	Eagles	Coastal Plain	D		42–77	McHenry/DeMasi	
1946	Eagles	Coastal Plain	D		67–56	Frank Rodgers	Lost League Finals
1947	Eagles	Coastal Plain	D	Atlanta Crackers	74–65	Steve Collins	League Champs
1948	Eagles	Coastal Plain	D		80–59	Steve Collins	Lost League Finals
1949	Eagles	Coastal Plain	D		74–64	Steve Collins	Lost League Finals
1950	Eagles	Coastal Plain	D	Boston Red Sox	70–68	Wally Millies	Lost League Finals
1951	Eagles	Coastal Plain	D		79–47	Wes Livengood	Lost in 1st round
1952	Eagles	Coastal Plain	D	Detroit Tigers	76–47	Wayne Blackburn	Lost in 1st round

TABLE NOTES:

- The record for the 1938 team above were the actual wins and losses for that team. An ineligible player scandal caused the league office to award or take away wins and losses from teams based on their violations of the rules. The "official" adjusted record at the end of the season was 64–45.

== No Hitters ==
- Eddie Nowak (7/31/1939) vs the New Bern Bears

=== League histories ===
- Gaunt, Robert (1997). We Would Have Played Forever: The Story of the Coastal Plain Baseball League. Baseball America, Inc. ISBN 0-945164-02-5.
- Holaday, J. Chris (1998). Professional Baseball in North Carolina: An Illustrated City-by-City History, 1901–1996. McFarland & Company, Inc. ISBN 0-7864-0532-5.
- Lloyd, Johnson; Miles Wolff, eds. (2007). The Encyclopedia of Minor League Baseball, third ed. Baseball America, Inc. ISBN 978-1-932391-17-6.

=== Newspapers ===
- "The Kinston Daily Free Press". 1882–2011. – Issues for all seasons are available on microfilm at Lenoir Community College.
