= Goldsboro Goldbugs =

The Goldsboro Goldbugs were an Eastern Carolina League (1929) and Coastal Plain League (1937–1941, 1946–1949) baseball team based in Goldsboro, North Carolina, United States. Don Heffner played for the Goldsboro Goldbugs. The 1928 Goldsboro team won the Eastern Carolina championship playing as the Goldsboro Manufacturers.

After changing their moniker, Goldsboro continued minor league baseball play as members of the Class D Coastal Plain League. The Goldsboro Cardinals played in the 1950–1951 seasons as an affiliate of the St. Louis Cardinals. In their final season of play, the Goldsboro Jets concluded the tenure in the Coastal Plain League.
