= Fieldale Towlers =

- 1934–1936; Fieldale, Virginia

Minor league affiliations
- Class: Class D (1934–1936)
- League: Bi-State League (1934–1936)

Major league affiliations
- Team: Detroit Tigers (1936)

Team data
- Name: Fieldale Virginians (1934); Fieldale Towlers (1935–1936)
- Ballpark: Riverside Park (1934–1936)

The Fieldale Towlers was the primary moniker of the minor league baseball teams based in Fieldale, Virginia from 1934 to 1936. Fieldale teams played as members of the Class D level Bi-State League from 1934 to 1936. The Fieldale Towlers were an affiliate of the Detroit Tigers (1936).

Pro Football Hall of Fame member Joe Guyon was player/manager of the 1936 Fieldale Towlers.

== History ==
The Fieldale Virginians began minor league play as charter members of the 1934 Class D level Bi-State League. The Virginians finished their first season with a record of 36–41, placing 3rd in the six–team Bi-State League regular season under Manager Luther Hodge. The 1934 standings were: Danville-Schoolfield Leafs 53–25, Martinsville Manufacturers 46–29, Fieldale Virginians 36–41, Mount Airy Graniteers 33–43, Leaksville-Draper-Spray Triplets 32–45 and Mayodan Senators 29–46. Fieldale played their home games at Riverside Park.

The franchise was renamed as the Fieldale Towlers for the 1935 season. The moniker reflected the local industry of towel–producing textile mills. Continuing play in the Bi-State League, the Towlers ended the 1935 season with a record of 50–64, placing sixth in the eight–team Bi-State League regular season. Dixie Parker served as the Fieldale manager in 1935.

In their final season, the Fieldale Towlers became an affiliate of the Detroit Tigers. Fieldale finished the 1936 regular season with a record of 52–62, placing 7th in the Bi-State League standings. Joe Guyon, Red Smith and Jimmie Rimmer all served time as manager in 1936. Joe Guyon had a storied football career and was inducted into the Pro Football Hall of Fame in 1971. The Fieldale franchise folded from the Bi-State League following the 1936 season and were replaced by the South Boston Twins for the 1937 Bi-State League season. Fieldale, Virginak has not hosted another minor league franchise.

== The ballpark ==
From 1934 to 1936 Fieldale teams played home games at Riverside Park. Riverside Park had a ballpark capacity of 1,500, with field dimensions (Left, Center, Right) of: 325–380–325 (1936). Today, the site is known as Fieldale Park and has a baseball field that is still in use. The address is 188 Field Avenue, Fieldale, Virginia, 24089.

== Timeline ==
Year(s)	# Yrs.	Team	Level	League	Affiliate
1934	1	Fieldale Virginians	Class D	Bi-State League	None
1935	1	Fieldale Towlers	Class D	Bi-State League	None
1936	1	Fieldale Towlers	Class D	Bi-State League	Detroit Tigers

== Year-by-year records ==
Year	Record	Finish	Manager	Playoffs/Notes
1934	36–41	3rd	Luther Hodge	No playoffs held
1935	50–64	6th	Dixie Parker	No playoffs held
1936	52–62	7th	Joe Guyon / Red Smith / Jimmie Rimmer	No playoffs held

== Notable alumni ==
- Joe Guyon (1936, MGR) Pro Football Hall of Fame
- Jack Hallett (1936)
- Ralph Hodgin (1936)
- Joe Just (1936)
- Ken Keltner (1936) 7x MLB All-Star; Cleveland Indians Hall of Fame
- Boots Poffenberger (1935)
- Dixie Parker (1935, MGR)
- Red Smith (1936, MGR)
- Roy Vaughn (1935)
