= South Boston Wrappers =

- 1939–1940; South Boston, Virginia

Minor league affiliations
- Class: Class D (1937–1940)
- League: Bi-State League (1937–1940)

Major league affiliations
- Team: Boston Bees (1937)

Team data
- Name: South Boston Twins (1937); South Boston-Halifax Wrappers (1938); South Boston Wrappers (1939–1940)
- Ballpark: Fairgrounds Park (1937–1940)

The South Boston Wrappers were a minor league baseball team based in South Boston, Virginia. South Boston based teams played as members of the Class D level Bi-State League from 1937 to 1940, hosting home games at Fairgrounds Park. After playing as the "Twins" in their first season, they adopted the "Wrappers" nickname in 1938, while playing in partnership with Halifax, Virginia for that season. South Boston hosted minor league home games at Fairgrounds Park in South Boston.

The 1937 South Boston Twins were a minor league affiliate of the Boston Bees (Braves).

== History ==
The South Boston Twins began minor league play in becoming members of the 1937 Class D level Bi-State League. The "Twins" were a minor league an affiliate of the Boston Bees. The Bassett Furniture Makers (New York Yankees affiliate), Danville-Schoolfield Leafs (Boston Red Sox), Leaksville-Draper-Spray Triplets, Martinsville Manufacturers (St. Louis Cardinals), Mayodan Senators (Washington Senators), Mount Airy Reds (Pittsburgh Pirates) and Reidsville Luckies teams joined the Twins in beginning league play on April 22, 1937.

The teams' initial "Twins" nickname corresponds to the partnership with neighboring Halifax, Virginia, which resulted in a name change in 1938.

The Twins finished their first season of play with a record of 43–68, placing seventh in the eight–team Bi-State League regular season under manager James Shelton. South Boston finished 24.0 games behind the first place Bassett Furniture Makers in the final standings. South Boston did not qualify for the four-team playoffs eventually won by Bassett.

The South Boston-Halifax Wrappers continued play as members of the 1938 Bi-State League, as the name change also represented the partnership with neighboring Halifax, Virginia. The Wrappers again placed seventh in the standings, ending the 1938 regular season with a record of 43–77 and finishing 35.0 games behind the first place Bassett Furniture Makers. The team was managed by James Calleran and John Carey. South Boston-Halifax did not qualify for the four-team playoff, won again by Bassett.

The 1939 South Boston Wrappers placed seventh in the Bi-State League for the third consecutive season. With a record of 46–65, South Boston finished 22.5 games behind the first place Danville-Schoolfield Leafs, playing under manager Dixie Parker. With their seventh place finish, the Wrappers did not qualify for the playoffs. Danville-Schoolfield was the eventual league champion.

In their final season of play, The South Boston Wrappers finished fifth in the 1940 Bi-State League, playing the season under managers Jack Crosswhite and Allen Mobley. Ending the 1940 regular season with a record of 56–60, South Boston ended the season 16.5 games behind the pennant winning Bassett Furniture Makers. South Boston's Orville Nesselrode led the Bi-State league with 25 home runs. The Martinsville Manufacturers defeated Bassett in the playoff finals, as the Wrappers did not qualify for the playoffs. After the 1940 season the Bi-State League condensed to six teams from eight and the South Boston franchise permanently folded.

South Boston has not hosted another minor league team.

== The ballpark ==
South Boston teams were noted to have played minor league home games at Fairgrounds Park. With a capacity of 3,000 in 1939, the ballpark had dimensions of (Left, Center, Right): 310–345–315 in 1939. The ballpark was located on the grounds of the Halifax County Fairgrounds and South Boston Speedway.

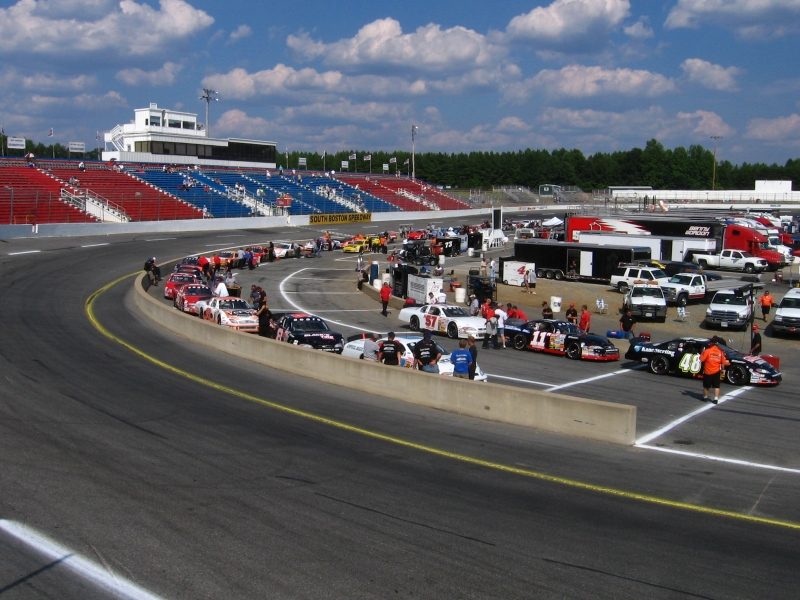
(2008) South Boston Speedway. South Boston, Virginia

== Timeline ==
Year(s)	# Yrs.	Team	Level	League	Affiliate	Ballpark
1937	1	South Boston Twins	Class D	Bi-State League	Boston Bees	Fairgrounds Park
1938	1	South Boston-Halifax Wrappers	Class D	Bi-State League	None	Fairgrounds Park
1939–1940	2	South Boston Wrappers	Class D	Bi-State League	None	Fairgrounds Park

== Year-by-year records ==
Year	Record	Finish	Manager	Playoffs/Notes
1937	43–68	7th	James Shelton	Did not qualify
1938	43–77	7th	James Calleran / John Carey	Did not qualify
1939	46–65	7th	Dixie Parker	Did not qualify
1940	56–60	5th	Jack Crosswhite / Allen Mobley	Did not qualify

== Notable alumni ==
- Joe Burns (1937–1938)
- Charlie Fuchs (1938–1939)
- Buster Maynard (1937)
- Dave Odom (1940)
- Dixie Parker (1939, MGR)
- Buck Rogers (1940)
- Neb Stewart (1939–1940)
- South Boston Twins players
- South Boston Wrappers players
- South Boston-Halifax Wrappers players
