= Martinsville Athletics =

- 1945–1949; (1934–1941, 1945–1949); Martinsville, Virginia

Minor league affiliations
- Class: Class D (1934–1941); Class C (1945–1948); Class B (1949)
- League: Bi-State League (1934–1941); Carolina League (1945–1949)

Major league affiliations
- Team: St. Louis Cardinals (1939); Philadelphia Phillies (1940–1941); Philadelphia Athletics (1945–1949)

Minor league titles
- League titles (2): 1940; 1948
- Wild card berths (7): 1934; 1937; 1939; 1940; 1941; 1945; 1948

Team data
- Name: Martinsville Manufacturers (1934–1941); Martinsville Athletics (1945–1949)
- Ballpark: English Field (1934–1941, 1945–1949)

The Martinsville Athletics (or the interchangeable "A's") were a minor league baseball team based in Martinsville, Virginia. From 1945 to 1949, the "Athletics" teams played as members of the Class C (1945–1948) and Class B level Carolina League as a minor league affiliate of the Philadelphia Athletics, winning the 1948 Carolina League championship.

The Martinsville "Manufacturers" preceded the Athletics in minor league play and were members of the Class D level Bi-State League from 1934 to 1941, winning the 1940 league championship. The Manufacturers played as a minor league affiliate of both the St. Louis Cardinals (1939) and Philadelphia Phillies (1940–1941).

The Martinsville teams all hosted home minor league games at English Field, which is still in use today, known as Hooker Field at Lou Whitaker Park.

Baseball Hall of Fame members Enos Slaughter and Heinie Manush were members of Martinsville teams. Slaughter played for the 1935 Manufacturers and Manush was the manager of the 1945 Athletics.

== History ==
=== 1934 to 1938 - Martinsville Manufacturers (Bi-State League) ===
The 1934 Martinsville "Manufacturers" were the first minor league team hosted in Martinsville, Virginia. The Manufacturers began minor league play as charter members of the 1934 Class D level Bi-State League. Martinsville joined with the Danville-Schoolfield Leafs, Fieldale Virginians, Leaksville-Draper-Spray Triplets, Mayodan Senators and Mount Airy Graniteers teams in beginning league play on May 3, 1934. With the 1934 season, Martinsville began playing their home minor league games at English Field, which still hosts baseball at the site today, known as Hooker Field at Lou Whitaker Park.

The Manufacturers finished their first season with a record of 46–29, placing second in the six–team Bi-State League regular season, playing the season under player/manager Jimmy Sanders, who had a notable season as a hitter. Martinsville finished 5.5 games behind the first place Danville-Schoolfield Leafs in the final regular season standings. Martinsville lost in the playoff final to Danville-Schoolfield 4 games to 1. Player/manager Jimmy Sanders won the Bi-State League batting championship, hitting .423 on the season. Overall, Sanders' .423 average was the highest batting average in any of the minor leagues in 1934 season, ahead of Phil Weintraub, who hit .401 for Nashville Vols in the Southern Association.

The Martinsville use of the "Manufacturers" nickname corresponds with local industry in the era. Martinsville was home to numerous towel–producing textile mills.

Continuing play in the Bi-State League, the Martinsville Manufacturers ended the 1935 season with a record of, 42–71 placing seventh in the eight–team Bi-State League regular season. Harold Bohl served as the Martinsville manager in 1935. Martinsville finished 28.0 games behind the first place Leaksville-Draper-Spray Triplets in the final standings and did not qualify for the playoffs, won by the Danville Leafs.

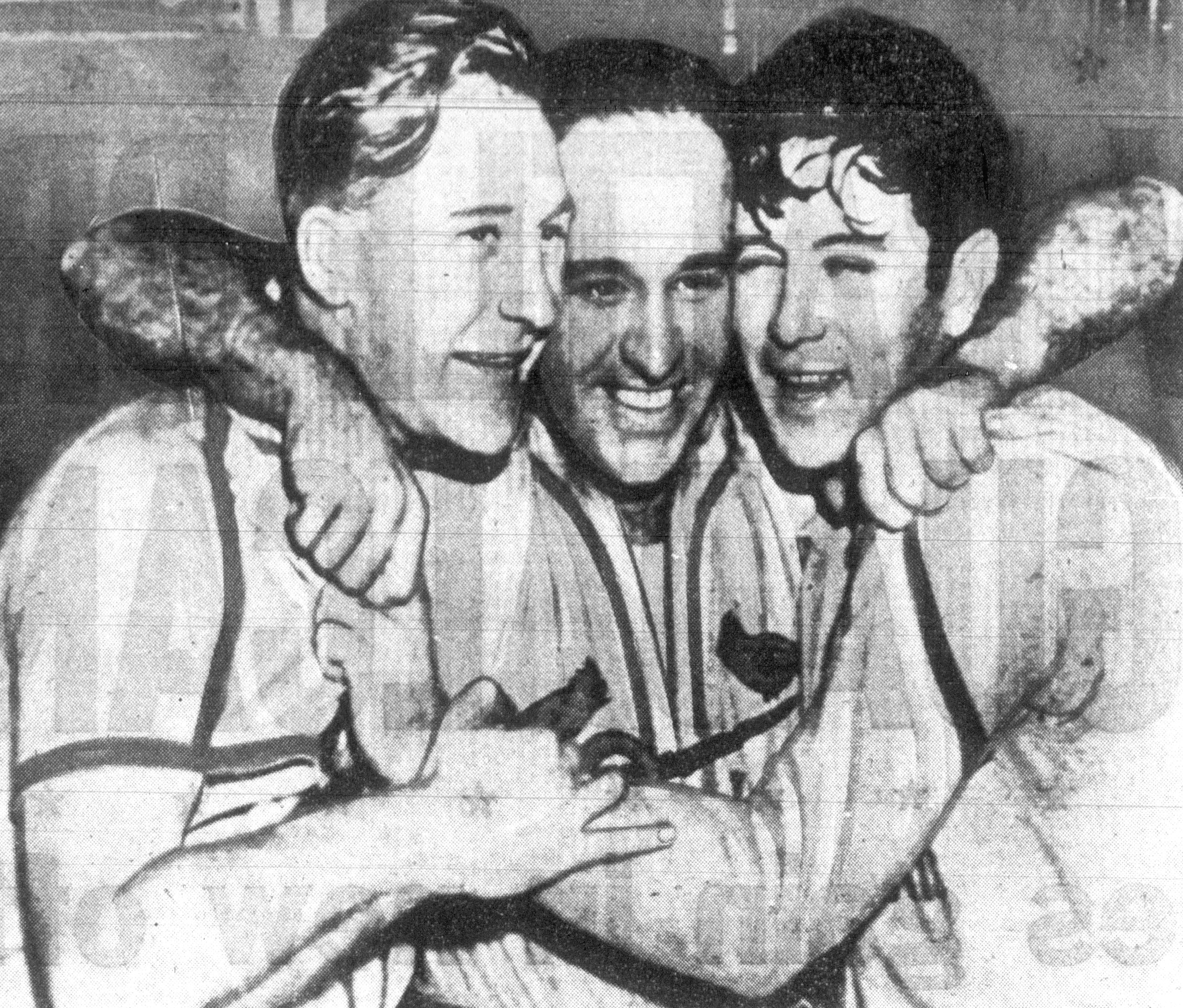
(1942) Whitey Kurowski, Enos Slaughter and Johnny Beazley celebrate the St. Louis Cardinals' 1942 World Series championship. Baseball Hall of Fame member Slaughter began his professional career with Martinsville in 1935.

Baseball Hall of Fame member Enos Slaughter played his first professional season with Martinsville in 1935. Slaughter was a native of Roxboro, North Carolina, where he was nicknamed "Country." In 1935, scout Billy Southworth signed Slaughter to a contract with the St. Louis Cardinals. In his first professional season, Slaughter was sent by the Cardinals to play for the Martinsville Manufacturers. Playing for Martinsville at age 19, Slaughter hit .273, with 25 doubles, 11 triples and 18 home runs in 109 games. Slaughter made his major league debut with the St. Louis Cardinals at the beginning of the 1938 season.

Pitcher Roy Vaughn played for Martinsville in 1935 in his final season as a player. Vaughn died in Martinsville in March 1937 at age 25.

The Martinsville Manufacturers finished the 1936 regular season with a record of 59–58, placing fourth in the Bi-State League regular season standings as Jimmy Sanders returned to manage Martinsville. Martinsville finished just 0.5 game behind the first place Bassett Furnituremakers in the final overall regular season standings of the eight-team league. Martinsville did not qualify for the playoff won by Bassett over Leaksville-Draper-Spray after Bassett had won the first half title and Leaksville-Draper-Spray won the second half title in a split season schedule.

Martinsville again finished in fourth place in the 1937 Bi-State League. Ending the regular season with a record of 63–50, the Manufacturers were managed by William Rea and Arnold Anderson. Martinsville finished 5.5 games behind the first place Bassett Furnituremakers in the final regular season standings of the eight-team league and qualified for the four-team playoffs. With their fourth-place finish, Martinsville qualified for the playoffs after the Mount Airy Reds franchise had folded during the season with a 52–11 record. Defeated the Mayodan Senators 3 games to 2 in the first round. Lost in the finals to Bassett in a seven-game series.

Continuing play in the 1938 Bi-State League, the Manufacturers ended the season with a record of 61–56 to finish in fifth place. Martinsville was managed by returning manager Arnold Anderson. Martinsville ended the regular season 15.5 games behind the first place Bassett Furnituremakers. The Manufacturers did not qualify for the playoffs won by Bassett.

=== 1939 to 1941 - Bi-State League championship / minor league affiliate ===
Martinsville qualified for the playoffs in the 1939 Bi-State League, as the Manufacturers became a minor league affiliate of the St. Louis Cardinals in the eight-team, Class D level league. The Manufacturers ended the regular season with a 61–52 to finish 4.5 gamed behind the first place Danville-Schoolfield Leafs. Ending the season in fourth place, Martinsville was managed by Jim Poole, Al Krupski and Harry Daughtry. In the four-team playoffs, Martinsville lost in the first round to the Leaksville-Draper-Spray Triplets, who defeated Martinsville 4 games to 1 en route to the league championship.

Jim Poole was a long-time manager in the minor leagues. Poole came to Martinsville in 1939 after having managed the rival Reidsville Luckies of the Bi-State League in 1938. After Poole left Martinsville during the 1939 season, he then became manager of the Landis Spinners of the North Carolina State League to complete the season.

The Martinsville Manufacturers won the 1940 Bi-State League championship, playing their championship season as a new minor league affiliate of the Philadelphia Phillies. Ending the regular season with a 68–49 record the Manufacturers ended the season in second place. The returning Harry Daughtry served as the Martinsville manager as the first place Bassett Furniture Makers finished 2.5 games ahead of second place Martinsville in the eight-team Class D level league. The Manufacturers won the Bi-State League championship by defeating the Danville-Schoolfield Leafs 4 games to 2 in the first round playoff series and then winning a 7-game series over Bassett in the finals.

Pitcher Charlie Frye played for Martinsville in both 1939 and 1940. Frye was called to the major leagues by the Philadelphia Phillies and made his major league debut on July 28, 1940, pitching 2 scoreless innings in relief against the Cincinnati Reds. Frye later served in World War II, in Company D, 221st Battalion of the US Army. Frye died on May 25, 1945.

The Martinsville Manufacturers played their final Bi-State Season in 1941, as the league reduced to a six-team league and Martinsville remained as a Philadelphia Phillies affiliate. With a regular season record of 63–49, Martinsville placed second, finishing 1.5 games behind the Leaksville-Draper-Spray Triplets, while playing the season under manager George Ferrell. The Mayodan Millers franchise folded before the end of the B-State League season The Manufacturers lost in first round to the Sanford Spinners 4 games to 3. Albert Behrends of Martinsville won the league batting title, hitting .378 and also led the league with 171 total hits. His Martinsville teammate Tom Burnette led the league with both 28 home runs and 114 RB1. The Manufacturers' player/manager George Ferrell tied Burnette with a co-league leading 114 RBI.

The Martinsville franchise did not return to the 1942 Bi-State League, as the six-team league played its final season before folding. The Burlington Bees, Rocky Mount Rocks and Wilson Tobs teams replaced Martinsville, Mayodan and Mount Airy in the 1942 league.

=== 1945 to 1949 - Martinsville Athletics (Carolina League) ===
The Martinsville franchise returned to minor league play in 1945, following the completion of World War II. The Bi-State League did not reform and the Martinsville "Athletics" became members of the eight-team, Class C level Carolina League, playing as a minor league affiliate of the Philadelphia Athletics. The Burlington Bees, Danville-Schoolfield Leafs (New York Giants affiliate), Durham Bulls (Boston Red Sox), Greensboro Patriots (Philadelphia Phillies), Leaksville-Draper-Spray Triplets (Chicago Cubs), Raleigh Capitals (Cincinnati Reds) and Winston-Salem Cardinals (St. Louis Cardinals) teams joined with Martinsville in the reformed Carolina League, which began play on April 26, 1945.

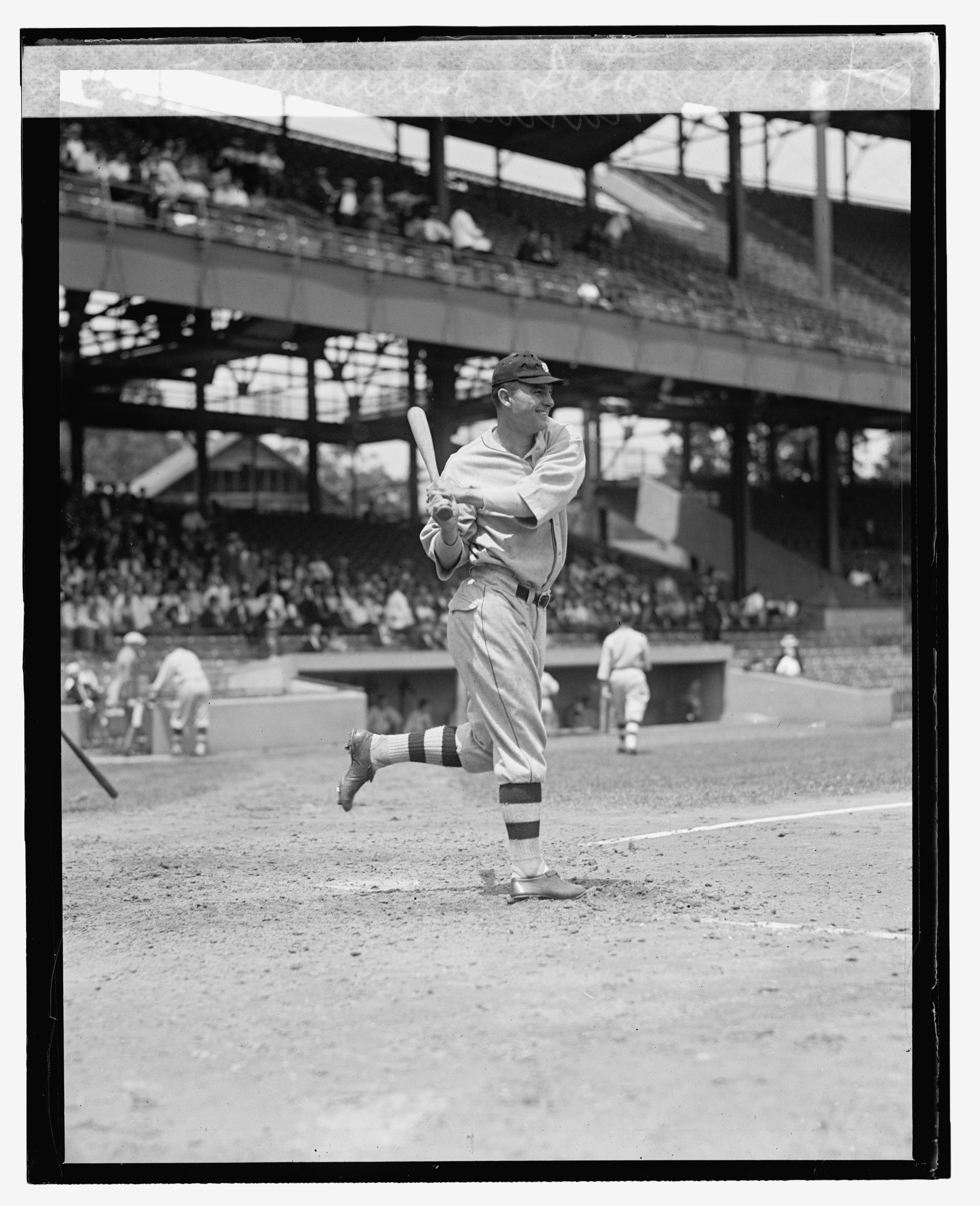
(1924) Heinie Manush, Detroit Tigers. A member of the Baseball Hall of Fame, Manush managed the 1945 Martinsville Athletics.

Baseball Hall of Fame member Heinie Manush became the Martinsville Athletics manager in 1945. A former star player, in 1944, Manush had been the manager of the Scranton Miners in the Eastern League. After managing the Athletics, Manush scouted for the Boston Braves until 1948, before becoming a bench coach for the Washington Senators during the 1953 and 1954 seasons.

In their first season of play, the Athletics qualified for the Carolina League playoffs, led by their hall of fame manager. The Athletics finished the 1945 with a record of 69–67, which gave Martinsville a third-place finish, with the team managed by Heinie Manush. The Athletics ended the season 24.0 games behind the first place Danville-Schoolfield Leafs in the final regular season standings. Martinsville lost in first round of the playoffs 4 games to 2 to the eventual Carolina League champion Danville

In the 1946 Carolina League, Martinsville did not qualify for the four-team playoffs. Continuing play in the eight-team Class C level Caroling League, the Athletics ended the season with a final record of 67–75 to finished in sixth place, playing the season under manager Cliff Bolton. Bolton had been a player for Martinsville in 1945 and was elevated to manager in 1946. Martinsville finished 18.0 games behind the first place Greensboro Patriots in the regular season standings. With their sixth place finish, the Athletics did not qualify for the playoffs, won by the Raleigh Capitals.

The Martinsville Athletics finished in last place in the 1947 Carolina League standings. Martinsville ended the regular season with a final record of 53–88. The team finished in eighth place and were managed by Joe Glenn and Woody Wheaton during the season. Martinsville ended the regular season 33.5 games behind the first place Burlington Bees in the standings. The Athletics did not qualify for the playoffs, won by the Raleigh Capitals.

Martinsville manager Joe Glenn had a career as a major league catcher. Glenn was born Joseph Michael Gurzensky, before changing his last name. Glenn had the unique distinction of having caught both Babe Ruth and Ted Williams, while they were pitching. Glenn was the catcher for Ruth during his last pitching game. On October 1, 1933, in the final game of the season, Ruth started and pitched a complete game in a 6-5 victory for the New York Yankees over the Boston Red Sox. Glenn later caught Ted Williams in Williams' only pitching appearance, which occurred at Fenway Park on August 24, 1940. With Glenn replacing Jimmy Foxx at catcher when Williams moved from left field to pitcher, Williams threw the final two innings for the Boston Red Sox against the Detroit Tigers in an 11-1 Tigers win.

In 1948, the Athletics rebounded from their last place finish in 1947 to capture the Bi-State League championship Martinsville had a regular season of 81–61 to finish in second place, playing under manager Eddie Morgan. The Athletics ended the season 3.0 games behind the first place Raleigh Capitols before their playoff run to the championship. In the first round of the playoffs, the Athletics defeated the Danville Leafs 4 games to 1 to advance. Martinsville became the 1948 Carolina League champions be defeating the Burlington Bees 4 games to 1 in the finals.

The Carolina League was upgraded to become a Class B level league in 1949 and the Athletics finished in last place one season after winning the championship. In their final season of Carolina League play, the Athletics ended the 1949 season in last place in the eight-team league, having remained as a Philadelphia Athletics affiliate throughout their league tenure. Martinsville ended the 1949 season with a record of 52–92, playing the season under manager George Staller. Martinsville ended their season 34.5 games behind the first place Danville Leafs. With their last place finish, Martinsville did not qualify for the playoffs won by the Burlington Bees.

Martinsville did not return to the 1950 Carolina League, replaced by the Fayetteville A's in the league. Fayetteville was an affiliate of the Philadelphia Athletics.

After the departure on the Athletics, Martinsville was without minor league baseball for nearly 40 years. The city next hosted minor league baseball in 1988, when the Martinsville Phillies began a tenure of play as members of the Appalachian League.

== The ballpark ==
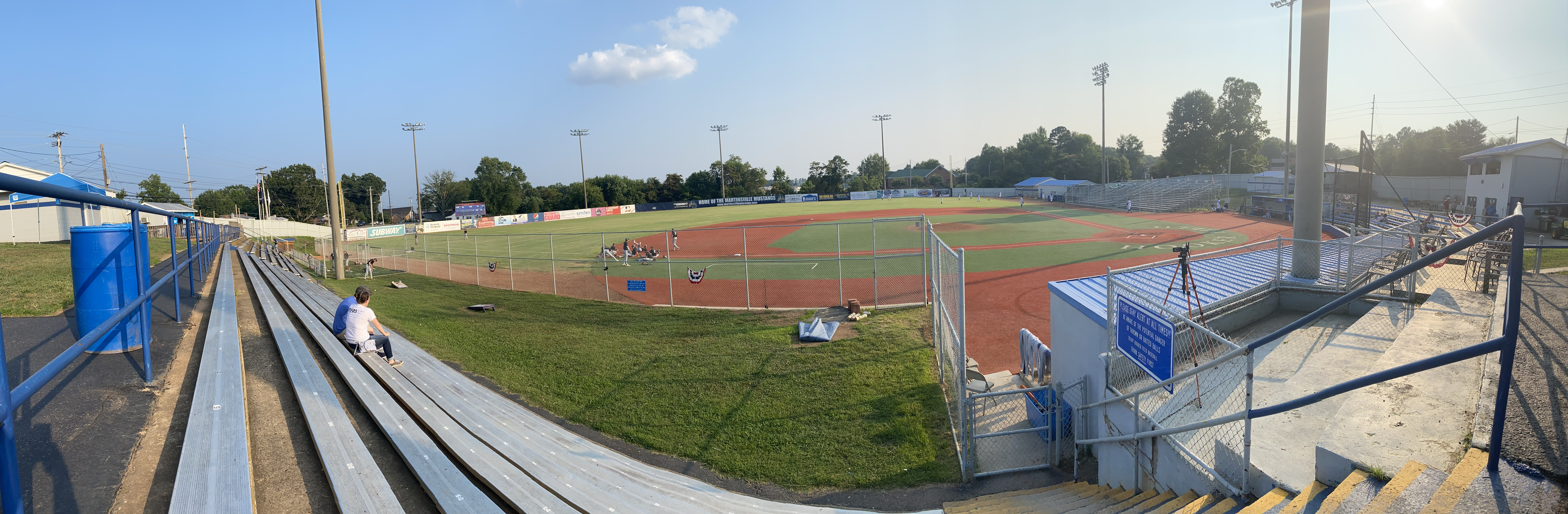
(2021) Hooker Field. Martinsville, Virginia. Today's Hooker Field site was previously called English Park and hosted the Martinsville minor league teams.

The Martinsville minor league teams played home games at English Park. Today the ballpark is called Hooker Field and serves as the home of the Martinsville Mustangs of the collegiate amateur Coastal Plain League.. In 2024, Hooker Field was renamed to become "Hooker Field at Lou Whitaker Park." An opening ceremony was held to rename the ballpark and honor Martinsville native Lou Whitaker, namesake of the ballpark. The ballpark is located at 450 Commonwealth Boulevard East in Martinsville, Virginia.

== Timeline ==
Year(s)	# Yrs.	Team	Level	League	Affiliate	Ballpark
1934–1938	5	Martinsville Manufacturers	Class D	Bi-State League	None	English Park
1939	1	Martinsville Manufacturers	Class D	Bi-State League	St. Louis Cardinals	English Park
1940–1941	2	Martinsville Manufacturers	Class D	Bi-State League	Philadelphia Phillies	English Park
1945–1948	4	Martinsville Athletics	Class C	Carolina League	Philadelphia Athletics	English Park
1949	1	Martinsville Athletics	Class B	Carolina League	Philadelphia Athletics	English Park

== Year-by-year records ==
Year	Record	Finish	Manager	Playoffs/Notes
Martinsville Manufacturers (Bi-State League)
1934	46–29	2nd	Jimmy Sanders	Lost League Finals
1935	42–71	7th	Harold Bohl	Did not qualify
1936	59–58	4th	Jimmy Sanders	Did not qualify
1937	63–50	4th	William Rea / Arnold Anderson	Lost League Finals
1938	61–56	5th	Arnold Anderson	Did not qualify
1939	61–52	4th	Jim Poole / Al Krupski / Harry Daughtry	Lost in 1st round
1940	68–49	2nd	Harry Daughtry	League champions
1941	63–49	2nd	George Ferrell	Lost in 1st round
Martinsville Athletics (Carolina League)
1945	69–67	3rd	Heinie Manush	Lost in 1st round
1946	67–75	6th	Cliff Bolton	Did not qualify
1947	53–88	8th	Joe Glenn / Woody Wheaton	Did not qualify
1948	81–61	2nd	Eddie Morgan	League champions
1949	52–92	8th	George Staller	Did not qualify

== Notable alumni ==
- Heinie Manush (1945, MGR) Inducted Baseball Hall of Fame, 1964
- Enos Slaughter (1935) Inducted Baseball Hall of Fame, 1985
- Orie Arntzen (1937)
- Gene Bearden (1935)
- Cliff Bolton (1945; 1946, MGR)
- Bob Bowman (1935)
- Earle Brucker Jr. (1949)
- Paul Busby (1940–1941)
- Harry Byrd (1945)
- Ed Clary (1935)
- Tom Clyde (1948)
- Pat Cooper (1947–1948)
- Zeb Eaton (1939)
- Slim Emmerich (1941)
- Charlie Frye (1939–1940)
- Joe Glenn (1947, MGR)
- Tom Kirk (1945)
- Mike Kume (1949)
- Bill Miller (1945)
- Eddie Morgan (1948, MGR)
- Sam Narron (1934)
- Jim Poole (1939, MGR)
- Danny Reynolds (1940–1941)
- Bob Rinker (1949)
- Jimmy Sanders (1934, 1936, MGR)
- Freddy Schmidt (1937–1938)
- Billy Shantz (1949)
- Billy Southworth Jr. (1935)
- George Staller (1949, MGR)
- Turkey Tyson (1940)
- Roy Vaughn (1935)
- Woody Wheaton (1947, MGR)
- Bob Wellman (1947)
- Ernie White (1937)

== See also ==
- Martinsville Manufacturers players
- Martinsville A's players
