= North Wilkesboro Flashers (baseball) =

- 1948–1950; North Wilkesboro, North Carolina

Minor league affiliations
- Class: Class D (1948–1950)
- League: Blue Ridge League (1948–1950)

Major league affiliations
- Team: None

Minor league titles
- League titles (1): 1949
- Wild card berths (2): 1948; 1949

Team data
- Name: North Wilkesboro Flashers (1948–1950)
- Ballpark: Memorial Park (1948–1950)

The North Wilkesboro Flashers were a minor league baseball team based in North Wilkesboro, North Carolina, United States. From 1948 to 1950, the "Flashers" played exclusively as members of the Class D level Blue Ridge League, winning the 1949 league championship. North Wilkesboro hosted home minor league games at Memorial Park. The team nickname was in reference to team manager Harry Lohman, whose nickname was "Flash."

== History ==
Minor league baseball was first hosted in North Wilkesboro, North Carolina in 1948, when the North Wilkesboro "Flashers" became as members of the six–team Class D level Blue Ridge League. The Galax Leafs, Leaksville-Draper-Spray Triplets, Mount Airy Graniteers, Radford Rockets and Wytheville Pioneers teams joined North Wilkesboro in beginning league play on May 1, 1948,

The North Wilkesboro use of the "Flashers" moniker was in reference to player/manager Henry Lohman, who was nicknamed "Flash." Lohman would manage the team in each of the three seasons of play.

The Flashers placed second in their first season of play and qualified for the playoffs. With a record of 72–54, playing under manager Henry Loman, North Wilkesboro finished 4.5 games behind the first place Galax Leafs in the regular season standings. North Wilkesboro lost in the first round of the playoffs, as the Mount Airy Graniteers defeated North Wilkesboro 3 games to 1 in the playoff series.

Following the 1948 season, the North Wilkesboro Flashers organization sought public sources for funding. The North Wilkesboro franchise sold stock shared to the public. Two hundred shares were issued at $100.00 each by "The North Wilkesboro Baseball Club, Inc."

The North Wilkesboro Flashers won the 1949 Blue Ridge League championship. The Flashers ended the 1949 Blue Ridge League regular season in fourth place. The Flashers ended the regular season with a 62–62 record, finishing 5.0 games behind the first place Mt. Airy Graniteers, while playing under managers Tom Daddino, the returning Henry Loman and Bernie Keating. In the playoffs, the North Wilkesboro Flashers defeated the Galax Leafs 4 games to 2 to advance. In the Finals, North Wilkesboro won the championship by defeating the Wytheville Statesmen 4 games to 1.

In their final season, the 1950 North Wilkesboro Flashers placed last in the Blue Ridge League standings. As the league played with six teams in its final season, the Flashers ended the 1950 season with a record of 40–76, placing sixth in the Blue Ridge League regular season standings. Playing under managers Bernie Loman and Henry Loman, North Wilkesboro finished 44.0 games behind the first place Elkin Blanketeers in the final standings. The Blue Ridge League permanently folded after the 1950 season.

North Wilkesboro, North Carolina has not hosted another minor league franchise.

== The ballpark ==
The North Wilkesboro Flashers were noted to have played minor league home games at Memorial Park. The site today is reportedly called William K. Newton Memorial Park.

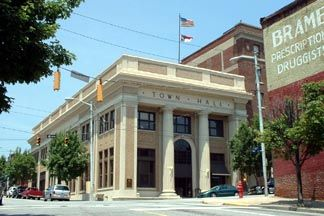
(2000) Town Hall. North Wilkesboro, North Carolina

== Timeline ==
Year(s)	# Yrs.	Team	Level	League	Ballpark
1948–1950	3	North Wilkesboro Flashers	Class D	Blue Ridge League	Memorial Park

== Year–by–year records ==
Year	Record	Finish	Manager	Playoffs/Notes
1948	72–54	2nd	Henry Loman	Lost in 1st round
1949	62–62	4th	Thomas Daddino / Henry Loman / Bernard Keating	League champions
1950	40–78	6th	Bernard Loman / Henry Loman	Did not qualify

== Notable alumni ==
- Paul Pryor (1948)
- North Wilkesboro Flashers players
