= Bi-State League =

Defunct baseball league in Virginia and North Carolina

- Classification: Class D (1936–1942)
- Sport: Minor League Baseball
- First season: 1934
- Folded: 1942
- President: J. Frank Wilson (1934); Dr. J.E. Taylor (1935); Jake Wells (1936); Win Clark (1937); Joseph Garrett (1938-1940); J. P. Wells (1941); Dr. T. S. Wilson (1942)
- No. of teams: 14
- Country: United States of America
- Most titles: 3 Bassett Furnituremakers; Danville Leafs/Danville-Schoolfield Leafs
- Related competitions: Bi-State League (1915)

The Bi-State League was an American baseball minor league formed in 1934 with teams in Virginia and North Carolina. The league held together for nine seasons, being represented by ten cities from North Carolina and eight from Virginia. Only the Leaksville-Draper-Spray Triplets, a team that was a combination of those three cities from North Carolina, was able to make the entire nine-year run. This combination also captured the league title in two seasons, 1935 and 1941. The squad from Bassett, Virginia, won four league titles during the span, coming out on top three times in a row, 1936, 1937, 1938 and closing it out with the 1940 pennant before losing in the finals. The league's final season was 1942, as it was not revived after World War II.

== List of teams ==
- Bassett, Virginia: Bassett Furnituremakers (1935–1940)
- Burlington, North Carolina: Burlington Bees (1942)
- Danville, Virginia: Danville Leafs (1934–1938)
- Danville, Virginia & Schoolfield, Virginia: Danville-Schoolfield Leafs (1939–1942)
- Fieldale, Virginia: Fieldale Virginians 1934; Fieldale Towlers (1935–1936)
- Leaksville, North Carolina, Draper, North Carolina, & Spray, North Carolina: Leaksville-Draper-Spray Triplets (1934–1942)
- Martinsville, Virginia: Martinsville Manufacturers (1934–1941)
- Mayodan, North Carolina: Mayodan Senators (1934, 1937; Mayodan Mills (1935); Mayodan Orphans (1936); Mayodan Millers (1938–1941)
- Mount Airy, North Carolina: Mount Airy Graniteers (1934, 1938–1941); Mount Airy Reds (1935–1937)
- Reidsville, North Carolina: Reidsville Luckies (1935–1940)
- Rocky Mount, North Carolina: Rocky Mount Rocks (1942)
- Sanford, North Carolina: Sanford Spinners (1941–1942)
- South Boston, Virginia & Halifax, Virginia: South Boston Twins (1937); South Boston-Halifax Wrappers (1938); South Boston Wrappers (1939–1940)
- Wilson, North Carolina: Wilson Tobs (1942)

== Standings & statistics ==
=== 1934 to 1938 ===
1934 Bi-State League

Team standings	W	L	PCT	GB	Managers
Danville Leafs	53	25	.679	-	Herb Brett
Martinsville Manufacturers	46	29	.613	5½	Jimmy Sanders
Fieldale Virginians	36	41	.468	16½	D. L. Hodge
Mount Airy Graniteers	33	43	.434	19	Cecil Harris / G. Thomas
Leaksville-Draper-Spray Triplets	32	45	.416	20½	Oscar Langley / Blackie Carter
Mayodan Senators	29	46	.387	22½	Zip Payne / Charles Eadmon / Monroe Mitchell

Playoff: Danville 4 games, Martinsville 1.

Player statistics
Player	Team	Stat	Tot	Player	Team	Stat	Tot
Jimmy Sanders	Martinsville	BA	.423	Cletus Voss	Fieldale	W	17
Woodrow Williams	Leaksville	Runs	86	Cletus Voss	Fieldale	SO	126
Zip Payne	Mayodan	Hits	134	Spencer Bruce	Danville	Pct	.813; 13-3
Eddie Weston	Mayodan	HR	26				

1935 Bi-State League

Team standings	W	L	PCT	GB	Managers
Leaksville-Draper-Spray Triplets	71	44	.617	-	Blackie Carter
Danville Leafs	68	46	.596	2½	Herb Brett
Bassett Furniture Makers	68	47	.591	3	Lefty Jenkins
Mount Airy Reds	67	47	.588	3½	Mickey Shader
Mayodan Mills	51	62	.451	19	Phil Lundeen
Fieldale Towlers	50	64	.439	20½	Dixie Parker
Martinsville Manufacturers	42	71	.372	28	Harold Bohl
Reidsville Luckies	39	75	.342	31½	Glenn Bickerstaff / L.J. Perry

Playoff: Danville 4 games, Bassett 3.

Player statistics
Player	Team	Stat	Tot	Player	Team	Stat	Tot
Ralph Hodgin	Fieldale	BA	.387	Fred Pipgras	Danville	W	25
Woody Williams	Leaksville	Runs	111	Jeff Jeffcoat	Leaksville	SO	222
Ralph Hodgin	Fieldale	Hits	187	Fred Pipgras	Danville	Pct	.806; 25-6
Blackie Carter	Leaksville	HR	30				

1936 Bi-State League

Team standings	W	L	PCT	GB	Managers
Bassett Furniture Makers	74	43	.632	-	Lefty Jenkins
Danville Leafs	74	45	.622	1	Herb Brett
Leaksville-Draper-Spray Triplets	65	51	.560	8½	Clyde Sukeforth
Martinsville Manufacturers	59	58	.504	15	Jimmy Sanders
Reidsville Luckies	54	61	.470	19	Jimmy Maus
Mount Airy Reds	53	63	.457	20½	Mickey Shader / Elbert Conway / Frank Packard
Fieldale Towlers	52	62	.456	20½	Joe Guyon / Red Smith
Mayodan Orphans	35	83	.297	39½	Phil Lundeen / Bill Ragsdale

Playoff: Bassett 4 games, Leaksville 2.

Player statistics
Player	Team	Stat	Tot	Player	Team	Stat	Tot
Gene Handley	Mt. Airy	BA	.403	Lefty Jenkins	Bassett	W	25
Ken Keltner	Fieldale	Runs	120	Weaver Nowlin	Leaksville	SO	167
Ken Keltner	Fieldale	Hits	175	Lefty Jenkins	Bassett	Pct	.833; 25-5
Woody Traylor	Danville	HR	34	Woody Traylor	Danville	RBI	120

1937 Bi-State League
schedule

Team standings	W	L	PCT	GB	Managers
Bassett Furniture Makers	68	45	.602	-	Ray White
Mayodan Senators	69	46	.600	-	Harry Daughtry
Danville Leafs	68	47	.591	1	Herb Brett
Martinsville Manufacturers	63	50	.558	5	Arnold Anderson
Mount Airy Reds	52	61	.460	16	Walt Novak
Reidsville Luckies	51	65	.440	18½	Charley Moore
South Boston Twins	43	68	.387	24	Jimmy Shelton
Leaksville-Draper-Spray Triplets	41	73	.360	27½	Clarence Blethen / Dave Lawless / Charles Wills

Playoff: Bassett 3 games, Danville 1; Martinsville 3 games, Mayodan 2, (one tie).
Finals: Bassett 4 games, Martinsville 3.

Player statistics
Player	Team	Stat	Tot	Player	Team	Stat	Tot
Doug Wheeler	Mayodan	BA	.359	Jesse Plummer	Mayodan	W	21
Doug Wheeler	Mayodan	Runs	111	Weaver Nowlin	Reidsville	SO	168
Cecil Payne	Mayodan	Hits	167	Jack Zerblis	Bassett	ERA	2.23
Doug Wheeler	Mayodan	RBI	71	Herb Leary	Reidsville	HR	29

1938 Bi-State League

Team standings	W	L	PCT	GB	Managers
Bassett Furniture Makers	76	40	.655	-	Walter Novak
Mayodan Millers	73	46	.613	4½	Harry Daughtry
Reidsville Luckies	71	48	.597	6½	Jim Poole
Danville Leafs	63	55	.534	14	Red Barnes
Martinsville Manufacturers	61	56	.521	15½	Arnold Anderson
Mount Airy Graniteers	49	69	.415	28	Dick Goldberg
South Boston-Halifax Wrappers	43	77	.358	35	James Calleran
Leaksville-Draper-Spray Triplets	37	82	.311	40½	Joe Feori

Playoff: Bassett 3 games, Reidsville 2; Danville 3 games, Mayodan 0.
Finals: Bassett 4 games, Danville 2.

Player statistics
Player	Team	Stat	Tot	Player	Team	Stat	Tot
Americo Rossomando	Bassett	BA	.390	Wes Livengood	Bassett	W	21
Ray Scantling	Reidsville	Runs	130	Raymon Voight	Reidsville	SO	200
Harry Lee Daughtry	Mayodan	Hits	174	Wes Livengood	Bassett	ERA	3.06
Ray Scantling	Reidsville	RBI	147	Ray Scantling	Reidsville	HR	33

=== 1939 to 1942 ===
1939 Bi-State League

Team standings	W	L	PCT	GB	Managers
Danville-Schoolfield Leafs	70	44	.614	-	Red Barnes
Leaksville-Draper-Spray Triplets	67	48	.583	3½	Arnold Anderson
Bassett Furnituremakers	60	51	.541	8½	Walter Novak
Martinsville Manufacturers	61	52	.540	8½	Jim Poole / Al Krupski; Harry Daughtry
Mayodan Millers	58	57	.504	12½	Harry Daughtry / Ramon Couto; Chink Outen
Reidsville Luckies	48	65	.425	21½	Watty Clark / Broaddus Culler
South Boston Wrappers	46	65	.414	22½	Dixie Parker
Mount Airy Graniteers	42	70	.375	27	Guy Lacy / Walter Stephenson

Playoff: Leaksville 4 games, Martinsville 1; Danville 4 games, Bassett 3.
Finals: Danville 4 games, Leaksville 2.

Player statistics
Player	Team	Stat	Tot	Player	Team	Stat	Tot
Sam Gentile	Danville	BA	.392	Joseph Weir	Danville	W	19
Jim Gruzdis	Leaksville	Runs	145	George Kadis	Danville	SO	199
Sam Gentile	Danville	Hits	199	Frank Hoerst	Mayodan	ERA	2.82
James Payne	Leaksville	RBI	126	Amerigo Scagliarini	Mayodan	HR	27

1940 Bi-State League

Team standings	W	L	PCT	GB	Managers
Bassett Furnituremakers	73	44	.624	-	Einar Sorenson
Martinsville Manufacturers	68	49	.581	5	Harry Daughtry
Mount Airy Graniteers	63	56	.529	11	Walter Novak
Danville-Schoolfield Leafs	59	58	.504	14	Red Barnes
South Boston Wrappers	56	60	.483	16½	Jack Crosswhite / H.A. Mobley
Leaksville-Draper-Spray Triplets	56	63	.471	18	Arnold Anderson
Mayodan Millers	53	66	.445	21	Pete Siciliano
Reidsville Luckies	43	75	.364	30½	Jim Callahan / Jim Gruzdis

Playoff: Martinsville 4 games, Danville 2; Bassett 4 games, Mt Airy 1.
Finals: Martinsville 4 games, Bassett 3.

Player statistics
Player	Team	Stat	Tot	Player	Team	Stat	Tot
Dan Amaral	Mayodan	BA	.387	Roy Peeler	Bassett	W	17
Alex Johnson	Mayodan	Runs	119	Flory Wojcik	Bassett	W	17
Alex Johnson	Mayodan	Hits	178	Flory Wojcik	Bassett	ERA	2.95
Clyde Vollmer	Bassett	RBI	117	Paige Dennis	Reid/Mt.Air	SO	187
Orville Nesselrode	South Boston	HR	25				

1941 Bi-State League

Team standings	W	L	PCT	GB	Managers
Leaksville-Draper-Spray Triplets	64	46	.582	-	Tim Murchison / Wes Ferrell
Martinsville Manufacturers	63	49	.563	2	George Ferrell
Danville-Schoolfield Leafs	64	50	.561	2	Elmer Yoter
Sanford Spinners	58	54	.518	7	Zeb Harrington
Mount Airy Graniteers	42	70	.375	23	Jimmy Maus
Mayodan Millers	25	47	.347	NA	Taylor Sanford

Mayodan disbanded July 18.
Playoff: Sanford 4 games, Martinsville 3,(one tie); Danville-Schoolfield, 4 games, Leaksville 1.
Finals: Sanford 4 games, Danville-Schoolfield 2.

Player Statistics
Player	Team	Stat	Tot	Player	Team	Stat	Tot
Albert Behrends	Martinsville	BA	.378	Dave Odom	Sanford	W	16
Richard Kalal	Danville	Runs	119	Charles Cuellar	Leaksville	W	16
Albert Behrends	Martinsville	Hits	171	Dave Odom	Sanford	SO	190
Tom Burnette	Martinsville	RBI	114	Roy Boles	Mt. Airy	Pct	.714; 10-4
Tom Burnette	Martinsville	HR	29	George Ferrell	Martinsville	RBI	114

1942 Bi-State League

Team standings	W	L	PCT	GB	Managers
Wilson Tobs	69	53	.566	-	Bill Herring
Sanford Spinners	62	59	.512	6½	Frank Rodgers
Rocky Mount Rocks	63	60	.512	6½	George Ferrell
Burlington Bees	62	62	.500	8	Rube Wilson
Leaksville-Draper-Spray Triplets	57	66	.463	12½	Zip Payne
Danville-Schoolfield Leafs	54	67	.446	14½	Elmer Yoter

Playoff: Rocky Mount 4 games, Wilson 3; Sanford 4 games, Burlington 1.
Finals: Rocky Mount 4 games, Sanford 1.

Player statistics
Player	Team	Stat	Tot	Player	Team	Stat	Tot
Richard Hoyle	Wilson	BA	.338	Charles Cuellar	Leaksville	W	22
Richard Hoyle	Wilson	Runs	108	Charles Cuellar	Leaksville	SO	204
George Biershenk	Rocky Mount	Hits	151	Charles Cuellar	Leaksville	ERA	1.67
George Ferrell	Rocky Mount	RBI	105	Harry Soufas	Rocky Mount	HR	29

== League champions ==
1934: Danville Leafs
1935: Danville Leafs
1936: Bassett Furniture Makers
1937: Bassett Furniture Makers
1938: Bassett Furniture Makers
1939: Danville-Schoolfield Leafs
1940: Martinsville Manufacturers
1941: Sanford Spinners
1942: Rocky Mount Rocks

== Sources ==
- Encyclopedia of Minor League Baseball, Lloyd Johnson, Miles Wolff. Publisher: Baseball America, 1993. Language: English. Format: Softcover, 420pp. ISBN 0-96371-891-6
