= Martinsville Phillies =

- 1988–1998; Martinsville, Virginia

Minor league affiliations
- Previous classes: A
- League: Appalachian League (1988–2003); Carolina League (1945–1949); Bi-State League (1934–1941)

Major league affiliations
- Previous teams: Houston Astros (1999–2003); Philadelphia Phillies (1940–1941; 1988–1998); Philadelphia A's (1945–1949), St. Louis Cardinals (1939)

Team data
- Previous names: Martinsville Astros (1999–2003); Martinsville A's (1945–1949); Martinsville Manufacturers (1934–1941)
- Colors: Red, White, Blue
- Previous parks: Hooker Field

The Martinsville Phillies were a short season minor league baseball team located in Martinsville, Virginia. Affiliated with the Philadelphia Phillies, they existed from 1988 to 1998, playing in the Appalachian League. They played their home games at Hooker Field. Martinsville was also home to the Martinsville Astros (1999–2003), Martinsville A's (1945–1949) and the Martinsville Manufacturers (1934–1941).

== Notable Martinsville alumni ==
- Gary Bennett
- Toby Borland
- Ricky Bottalico (1991) MLB All-Star
- Jason Boyd
- Bobby Estalella
- Tony Fiore
- Jason Kershner
- Mike Lieberthal (1990) 2 x MLB All-Star
- Ryan Madson
- Scott Rolen 7x MLB All Star; 1997 NL Rookie of the Year
- Jimmy Rollins (1996) 3x MLB All-Star; 2007 NL Most Valuable Player
- Carlos Silva (1996)
- Reggie Taylor
- Derrick Turnbow
- Bob Wells
- Ricky Williams

== Year-by-year record ==
Season-by-season results
Year	Record	Finish	Manager	Playoffs
1988	29–41	8th	Roly de Armas	
1989	29–38	8th	Roly de Armas	
1990	25–44	9th	Roly de Armas	
1991	27–41	7th	Roly de Armas	
1992	22–43	10th	Roly de Armas	
1993	22–46	10th	Ramon Henderson	
1994	32–36	6th	Ramon Henderson	
1995	30–37	6th	Ramon Henderson	
1996	20–47	8th	Ramon Henderson	
1997	29–39	9th	Kelly Heath	
1998	32–36	6th	Greg Legg	
