= Chink Outen =

American baseball player (1905–1961)

- Catcher
- Born: June 17, 1905; Mount Holly, North Carolina, U.S.
- Died: September 11, 1961 (aged 56); Durham, North Carolina, U.S.
- Batted: Left Threw: Right

MLB debut
- April 16, 1933, for the Brooklyn Dodgers

Last MLB appearance
- October 1, 1933, for the Brooklyn Dodgers

MLB statistics
- Batting average: .248
- Home runs: 4
- Runs batted in: 17
- Stats at Baseball Reference

Teams
- Brooklyn Dodgers (1933)

William Austin "Chink" Outen (June 17, 1905 – September 11, 1961) was an American professional baseball catcher. He played in Major League Baseball for the Brooklyn Dodgers in 1933, appearing in 93 games. Listed at 6 feet 0 inches (1.83 m) and 200 pounds (91 kg), he threw right-handed and batted left-handed.

Outen attended North Carolina State College, where he played college baseball for the Wolfpack. He played in the minor leagues from 1929 to 1939, appearing in over 1000 games. In the final season of his career, he was a player-manager for the Mayodan Millers in the Bi-State League. Outen was one of several baseball players in the first half of the 20th century with the nickname "Chink".
