= Martinsville Astros =

- 1999–2003; Martinsville, Virginia

Minor league affiliations
- Previous classes: A
- League: Appalachian League (1988–2003); Carolina League (1945–1949); Bi-State League (1934–1941)

Major league affiliations
- Previous teams: Houston Astros (1999–2003); Philadelphia Phillies (1940–1941; 1988–1998); Philadelphia A's (1945–1949), St. Louis Cardinals (1939)

Team data
- Previous names: Martinsville Phillies (1988–1998); Martinsville A's (1945–1949); Martinsville Manufacturers (1934–1941)
- Previous parks: Hooker Field

The Martinsville Astros were a short season minor league baseball team located in Martinsville, Virginia. The team was affiliated with the Houston Astros and played in the Appalachian League from 1999 to 2003. Martinsville was also home to the Martinsville Phillies (1988–1998), Martinsville A's (1945–1949) and the Martinsville Manufacturers (1934–1941).

== Ballpark ==
Beginning in 1988, the Martinsville home stadium was Hooker Field, located at 450 Commonwealth Boulevard in Martinsville, Virginia. The facility is still in use today. Previously, the A's and Manufacturers had played at Doug English Field.

== Alumni ==
=== Other Alumni ===
- Matt Albers (2002)
- Wandy Rodriguez (2001)
