= Blue Ridge League =

Minor league baseball leagues

- Sport: Baseball
- Founded: 1915
- Founder: Charles W. Boyer
- First season: 1915
- Folded: 9 February 1931
- No. of teams: 6 (1915–1917) (1920–1929); 4 (1918, 1930)
- Country: United States
- Last champion: Chambersburg Young Yanks
- Most titles: Hagerstown (5)
- Website: blueridgeleague.org

The Blue Ridge League was the name of two minor league baseball organizations that operated in the first half of the twentieth century in the United States.

== History ==
The first league operated for the better part of sixteen years, from 1915 through 1918, and 1920 to 1930. It was a Class D level league in the old classification system that ran from Class D up to Class Double-A, and had teams from Maryland, Pennsylvania and West Virginia.

The league was founded by Charles W. Boyer in 1915, as part of the National Association of Professional Baseball Leagues. Boyer, former president of the original South Atlantic League, served as the league president in the Blue Ridge League's inaugural season. Due to internal problems, Boyer resigned as president the first week of the 1916 season, being replaced by James Vincent Jamison Jr. Jamison was at the forefront of the league until it ceased its operations shortly before the beginning of the 1931 season.

Blue Ridge League play officially began in 1915 with six teams from Chambersburg, Frederick, Gettysburg, Hagerstown, Hanover and Martinsburg. The team to win the most games during the regular season was declared the pennant winner. Through the 1917 midseason, Chambersburg replaced Cumberland when this team refused to pay its annual forfeit fee. The league shrank from six teams to four in 1918, with teams representing Cumberland, Hagerstown, Martinsburg and Piedmont, and ultimately disbanded after three weeks of play due to the lack of players during World War I.

Due to the aftermath of the war and the 1918 flu pandemic, the Blue Ridge League did not resume operations until 1920, with Chambersburg, Frederick, Hagerstown, Hanover and Martinsburg rejoining the action, as well as the addition of the Waynesboro franchise to bring again the six-team format. Since 1928, the two teams with the best records competed in a series of play-off games to determine the League Champion. Gradually, six Major League Baseball franchises started their affiliation with the league, among others Cleveland Indians (Frederick), Detroit Tigers (Hanover), New York Yankees (Chambersburg), St. Louis Cardinals (Waynesboro) and Philadelphia Athletics (Martinsburg), Washington Senators (Hagerstown). But after the Wall Street crash of 1929, Detroit and St. Louis dropped their affiliations due to heavy financial losses. Only the teams of Chambersburg, Frederick, Hagerstown and Waynesboro returned in 1930, the Blue Ridge League's last season.

=== Cities/Teams/Years ===
Cities represented	Teams	Year(s)
Chambersburg, Pennsylvania	Chambersburg Maroons	1915–1917, 1920–1928
Chambersburg, Pennsylvania	Chambersburg Young Yanks	1929–1930
Cumberland, Maryland	Cumberland Colts	1917–1918
Frederick, Maryland	Frederick Hustlers	1915, 1917; 1920–1928
Frederick, Maryland	Frederick Champs	1916
Frederick, Maryland	Frederick Warriors	1929–1930
Gettysburg, Pennsylvania	Gettysburg Patriots; Gettysburg Ponies	1915; 1916–1917
Hagerstown, Maryland	Hagerstown Blues	1915
Hagerstown, Maryland	Hagerstown Terriers	1916–1918, 1922–1923
Hagerstown, Maryland	Hagerstown Champs	1920–1921
Hagerstown, Maryland	Hagerstown Hubs	1924–1930
Hanover, Pennsylvania	Hanover Hornets	1915
Hanover, Pennsylvania	Hanover Raiders	1916–1917, 1920–1929
Martinsburg, West Virginia	Martinsburg Champs	1915
Martinsburg, West Virginia	Martinsburg Blue Sox	1916–1917, 1922–1929
Martinsburg, West Virginia	Martinsburg Mountaineers	1920–1921
Piedmont, West Virginia; Westernport, Maryland	Piedmont-Westernport Drybugs	1918
Waynesboro, Pennsylvania	Waynesboro Red Birds	1928–1930
Waynesboro, Pennsylvania	Waynesboro Villagers	1921–1924; 1926–1927
Waynesboro, Pennsylvania	Waynesboro Cardinals	1925

=== Championship teams ===
- 1915 Frederick Hustlers
- 1916 Chambersburg Maroons
- 1917 Hagerstown Terriers
- 1918 Cumberland Colts
- 1919 Season suspended
- 1920 Hagerstown Champs
- 1921 Frederick Hustlers
- 1922 Martinsburg Blue Sox
- 1923 Martinsburg Blue Sox
- 1924 Martinsburg Blue Sox
- 1925 Hagerstown Hubs
- 1926 Hagerstown Hubs
- 1927 Chambersburg Maroons
- 1928 Hanover Raiders
- 1929 Hagerstown Hubs
- 1930 Chambersburg Young Yanks

=== Season records ===
==== Hitting ====
- Games: 118, Richard Zorman, Hanover (1929)
  118, Dan Tapson, Hanover (1929)
- Batting Average: .404, Roger "Doc" Cramer, Martinsburg (1929)
- At Bats: 466, Babe Phelps, Hagerstown (1930)
- Runs: 104, George Rawlings, Martinsburg (1923)
- Hits: 175, Babe Phelps, Hagerstown (1930)
- Doubles: 41, Holmes Diehl, Hagerstown (1925)
- Triples: 24, Joe Vosmik, Frederick (1929)
- Home Runs: 30, Hack Wilson, Martinsburg (1922)
- Extra Base Hits: 62, Babe Phelps, Hagerstown (1930)
  62, John Vosmik, Frederick (1929)
- Total Bases: 300, Babe Phelps, Hagerstown (1930)
- Sacrifices: 39, John Boyle, Hagerstown, (1925)
- Stolen Bases: 47, Walter Kimmick, Waynesboro (1921)
- Walks: 100, George Scheiminant, Hagerstown (1925)
- Struck Out: 77, Louis Allen, Hanover (1928)

==== Pitching ====
- Games: 39, Frank Fraley, Frederick (1929)
- Complete Games: 22, Frank Ulrich, Waynesboro (1923)
- Wins: 25, Earl Howard, Hagerstown (1917)
  25, Alan Clarke, Waynesboro (1921)
- Losses: 17, Stephen Woodgie, Chambersburg (1922)
- Best Percentage: .889 (16–2), Lester Shatzer, Chambersburg (1927)
- Innings Pitched: 274, Alan Clarke, Waynesboro (1921)
- Win Streak: 8, Abe Welcher, Hagerstown (1915)
- Strikeouts: 258, Alan Clarke, Waynesboro (1921)
- Hit Batsmen: 29, Alan Clarke, Waynesboro (1921)
- Bases on Balls: 163, Joe Zubris, Hagerstown (1925)

=== No-Hitters ===
Year	Date	Pitcher	Team	Opposition	Score
1915	August 3	Edward Stricker	Chambersburg	Gettysburg	1–0
1916	June 28	Wick Winslow	Hagerstown	Chambersburg	4–0
1916	August 25	Earl Howard	Hagerstown	Gettysburg	4–0
1924	July 5	Walt Halas	Hanover	Chambersburg	5–1
1926	August 3	Chuck Warden	Waynesboro	Hagerstown	3–0

== Second League ==
Another Blue Ridge League operated between 1946 and 1950. It was located in North Carolina and Virginia and was rated as a D-level league. The Presidents in the history of the league were Joe Ryan (1946), Stanley F. Radke (1947-'48), Judge E. C. Bivins (1948-'49) and John B. Spiers (1950). In 1946, the team with the best winning record was declared the pennant winner. From 1947 through 1950, the two teams with the best records faced in a series of play-off games to determine the League Champion.

=== Cities/Teams/Years ===
Cities represented	Teams	Year(s)
Abingdon, Virginia	Abingdon Triplets	1948
Bassett, Virginia	Bassett Statesmen	1950
Elkin, North Carolina	Elkin Blanketeers	1949–1950
Galax, Virginia	Galax Leafs	1946–1950
Leaksville, Draper, Spray, North Carolina	Leaksville-Draper-Spray Triplets	1948
Lenoir, North Carolina	Lenoir Red Sox	1946–1947
Mount Airy, North Carolina	Mount Airy Graniteers	1946–1950
North Wilkesboro, North Carolina	North Wilkesboro Flashers	1948–1950
Radford, Virginia	Radford Rockets	1946–1950
Salem, Virginia	Salem Friends	1946
Wytheville, Virginia	Wytheville Pioneers	1948
Wytheville, Virginia	Wytheville Statesmen	1949–1950

=== Championship teams ===
- 1946 Salem Friends/Lenoir Red Sox #
- 1947 Galax Leafs
- 1948 Galax Leafs
- 1949 Mount Airy Graniteers
- 1950 Elkin Blanketeers
1. Salem moved to Lenoir in the midseason

== Sources ==
- Minor League Baseball Standings: All North American Leagues, through 1999 – Benjamin Barrett Sumner. Publisher: McFarland & Company, 2000. Format: Hardcover, 726pp. Language: English. ISBN 0-7864-0781-6
- Encyclopedia of Minor League Baseball: The Official Record of Minor League Baseball – Lloyd Johnson, Miles Wolff, Steve McDonald. Publisher: Baseball America, 1997. Format: Paperback, 672pp. Language: English. ISBN 0-9637189-7-5
- The Blue Ridge League: Images of Baseball – Robert B. Savitt. Publisher: Arcadia Publishing, 2011. Format: Softcover, 127pp. Language: English. ISBN 978-0-7385-8239-9
