= Forest Home, Alabama =

Unincorporated community in Alabama, United States

- Unincorporated community
- Location within the state of Alabama Forest Home, Alabama (the United States)
- Coordinates: 31°51′44″N 86°50′33″W
- Country: United States
- State: Alabama
- County: Butler
- Elevation: 433 ft (132 m)
- Time zone: UTC-6 (Central (CST))
  - Summer (DST): UTC-5 (CDT)
- ZIP code: 36030
- Area code: 334

Forest Home is an unincorporated community in Butler County, Alabama. It has a post office with the 36030 ZIP code.

== Geography ==
Forest Home is located at 31.86237°N 86.84275°W and has an elevation of 433 feet (132 m).

== Notable person ==
- Dixie Parker, baseball player
