= Brokaw, Wisconsin =

- Village
- Motto: Rising by the river
- Location of Brokaw in Marathon County, Wisconsin.
- Coordinates: 45°1′42″N 89°39′23″W
- Country: United States
- State: Wisconsin
- County: Marathon
- Incorporated: 1903

Government
  - Type: Former Village

Area
  - Total: 1.21 sq mi (3.13 km^{2})
  - Land: 1.03 sq mi (2.68 km^{2})
  - Water: 0.17 sq mi (0.45 km^{2})
- Elevation: 1,220 ft (372 m)

Population (2010)
  - Total: 251
  - Estimate (2017): 248
  - Density: 240/sq mi (92.6/km^{2})
- Time zone: UTC-6 (Central (CST))
  - Summer (DST): UTC-5 (CDT)
- Area codes: 715 & 534
- FIPS code: 55-09975
- GNIS feature ID: 1562231

Brokaw is a former village in Marathon County, Wisconsin, United States. It is part of the Wausau, Wisconsin Metropolitan Statistical Area. The population was 251 at the 2010 census. Brokaw merged with the village of Maine on October 1, 2018 after the village became deeply in debt as the result of the closure of a paper mill in the former village.

== Geography ==
Brokaw is located at 45°1′42″N 89°39′23″W (45.028457, -89.656366).

According to the United States Census Bureau, the village has a total area of 1.23 square miles (3.19 km^{2}), of which 1.07 square miles (2.77 km^{2}) is land and 0.16 square miles (0.41 km^{2}) is water.

== Demographics ==
Historical population
Census	Pop.	Note	%±
1910	458		—
1920	493		7.6%
1930	514		4.3%
1940	477		−7.2%
1950	380		−20.3%
1960	319		−16.1%
1970	312		−2.2%
1980	298		−4.5%
1990	224		−24.8%
2000	107		−52.2%
2010	251		134.6%
2018 (est.)	245		−2.4%
U.S. Decennial Census

=== 2010 census ===
As of the census of 2010, there were 251 people, 123 households, and 66 families living in the village. The population density was 234.6 inhabitants per square mile (90.6/km^{2}). There were 138 housing units at an average density of 129.0 per square mile (49.8/km^{2}). The racial makeup of the village was 97.6% White, 1.6% Asian, 0.4% from other races, and 0.4% from two or more races. Hispanic or Latino of any race were 2.4% of the population.

There were 123 households, of which 19.5% had children under the age of 18 living with them, 35.0% were married couples living together, 13.0% had a female householder with no husband present, 5.7% had a male householder with no wife present, and 46.3% were non-families. 33.3% of all households were made up of individuals, and 5.7% had someone living alone who was 65 years of age or older. The average household size was 2.04 and the average family size was 2.59.

The median age in the village was 32.9 years. 13.9% of residents were under the age of 18; 12.9% were between the ages of 18 and 24; 32.3% were from 25 to 44; 25.2% were from 45 to 64; and 15.9% were 65 years of age or older. The gender makeup of the village was 45.8% male and 54.2% female.

=== 2000 census ===
As of the census of 2000, there were 107 people, 47 households, and 24 families living in the village. The population density was 108.6 people per square mile (41.7/km^{2}). There were 49 housing units at an average density of 49.7 per square mile (19.1/km^{2}). The racial makeup of the village was 98.13% White, 0.93% Native American, and 0.93% from two or more races. Hispanic or Latino of any race were 1.87% of the population.

There were 47 households, out of which 17.0% had children under the age of 18 living with them, 38.3% were married couples living together, 6.4% had a female householder with no husband present, and 48.9% were non-families. 38.3% of all households were made up of individuals, and 21.3% had someone living alone who was 65 years of age or older. The average household size was 2.28 and the average family size was 2.92.

In the village, the population was spread out, with 17.8% under the age of 18, 15.0% from 18 to 24, 30.8% from 25 to 44, 19.6% from 45 to 64, and 16.8% who were 65 years of age or older. The median age was 35 years. For every 100 females, there were 101.9 males. For every 100 females age 18 and over, there were 109.5 males.

The median income for a household in the village was $27,083, and the median income for a family was $54,167. Males had a median income of $26,458 versus $25,000 for females. The per capita income for the village was $28,290. There were 20.8% of families and 21.5% of the population living below the poverty line, including 50.0% of under eighteens and 17.6% of those over 64.

== History ==
In the 1880s, the Wausau Boom Company built a dam on the Wisconsin River near the present location of the village, and in 1903 the Village of Brokaw was incorporated. The community began to develop in the early 20th century around the Wausau Paper Mills. It was founded by paper company owner Norman Brokaw.

== Notable people ==
- Red Smith, MLB player, NFL player and assistant coach, head coach of the Georgetown Hoyas football team and Wisconsin Badgers football team, athletic director of Seton Hall University.
