= Van Fletcher =

American baseball player (1924–2010)

- Pitcher
- Born: Alfred Vanoide Fletcher; August 6, 1924; East Bend, North Carolina
- Died: March 17, 2010 (aged 85); Yadkinville, North Carolina
- Batted: Right Threw: Right

MLB debut
- April 12, 1955, for the Detroit Tigers

Last MLB appearance
- May 30, 1955, for the Detroit Tigers

MLB statistics
- Win–loss record: 0–0
- Earned run average: 3.00
- Strikeouts: 4
- Innings pitched: 12
- Stats at Baseball Reference

Teams
- Detroit Tigers (1955)

Alfred Vanoide Fletcher (August 6, 1924 – March 17, 2010) was an American professional baseball player. The right-handed pitcher appeared in nine games for the Detroit Tigers of Major League Baseball in 1955. He stood 6 feet 2 inches (1.88 m) tall and weighed 185 pounds (84 kg).

== Early life ==
Fletcher was born in East Bend, North Carolina, in 1924. His parents were Wesley E. and Rhett Fletcher. He volunteered for the United States Army and fought in World War II in the European Theater of Operations.

== Career ==
After the war, Fletcher was signed by the St. Louis Cardinals' organization. Beginning in 1949, he played for several minor league baseball teams, including the Elkin Blanketeers, Vancouver Capilanos, and Seattle Rainiers. In August 1954, the Detroit Tigers acquired him from the Rainiers.

In nine games (all in relief during the opening six weeks of the 1955 season) and 12 full innings pitched, he allowed 13 hits, two bases on balls, and ten runs—but only four were earned. He struck out four. He did not record a decision.

After spending the 1957 season with the Birmingham Barons, Fletcher retired from baseball. He returned to Yadkin County where he worked as a building contractor in the Winston-Salem and Yadkinville areas. He also farmed tobacco for many years.

== Personal life ==
Fletcher coached little league baseball in the 1960s and 1970s. He married Rilla Whitaker, and the couple had two sons.

Fletcher died in Yadkinville on March 17, 2010, at the age of 85.
