= Jacksonville Baseball Complex =

Baseball diamond in Jacksonville, Texas, US

Coordinates: 31.9536°N 95.2809°W

- Interactive map of Jacksonville Baseball Complex
- Full name: Jacksonville Baseball Complex
- Location: Jacksonville, Texas

Tenants
- Jacksonville Jax (West Dixie League) (1934–1935) (East Texas League) (1936–1940, 1946) (Lone Star League) (1947) (Gulf Coast League) (1950)

The Jacksonville Baseball Complex was a baseball diamond that once existed in Ragsdale Park in Jacksonville, Texas, and was the home of the Jacksonville Jax. The Jacksonville Rodeo Arena now occupies the site. Home plate was in the northwest corner of the square block.

== Location ==
The site of the former ballpark and present-day rodeo arena is situated on the corner of Mulberry and Bridge streets in Jacksonville.

== Sources ==
- "Texas Almanac 2008–2009," The Dallas Morning News, c.2008
