= Martinsville Mustangs =

Baseball team in Martinsville, US

- Logo

Information
- League: Coastal Plain League (West)
- Location: Martinsville, Virginia
- Ballpark: Hooker Field
- Founded: 2005
- Colors: Navy Blue; Vegas Gold
- Mascot: Mo
- Ownership: City of Martinsville
- Management: Next P.L.A.N. Athletics
- President: Jason Davis
- General manager: Connor Akeman
- Website: martinsvillemustangs.com

The Martinsville Mustangs are a baseball team in the Coastal Plain League, a collegiate summer baseball league. The team plays its home games at Hooker Field in Martinsville, Virginia. The Mustangs first started participating in the Coastal Plain League during the 2005 season.

== History ==
The pre-professional baseball team was founded in 2005 after the Martinsville Astros relocated following the 2003 season. In 2004, the City Council of Martinsville approved an effort to return baseball to Hooker Field with a city-owned franchise in the Coastal Plain League. In an October 2004 press conference, the council approved the purchase of a franchise and announced that then-city communications director Matt Hankins would serve as team president and lead the development of the team, including naming the team, hiring a general manager and selecting a coach, under the supervision of Assistant City Manager Wade Bartlett.

Hankins solicited public suggestions for a team name, drawing over 200 different responses and narrowing the list to six finalists. Using focus groups and community research, the list of potential mascots was narrowed to two: the Mallards or the Mustangs. He worked with Roanoke PR firm John Lambert Associates to develop potential logos, and worked with the Martinsville Bulletin to gather public input on the two choices. Based on nearly 80 percent support, the City announced that its baseball team would be known as the Martinsville Mustangs.

In 2010, the Mustangs hired Jim Taipalus, the former operations director for the Yuma Scorpions under the ownership of Dave Kaval, current president of the Athletics of Major League Baseball. During Taipalus' tenure with the Mustangs he decreased the team's expenses by 22% while increasing team revenue through multiple record breaking nights in attendance and game day revenue. Through Jim's leadership and creativity at the end of the 2011 season, the Martinsville Mustangs achieved their highest game day revenue in the franchises eight year history.

Additionally, the Mustangs overall attendance for the season had risen to 39,544 with an average game attendance of 1,582 per night a 55% percent increase from the previous season ranking the club 8th overall in the country for year to year attendance gains. According to BallParkBiz.com the Martinsville Mustangs were ranked 6th in Coastal Plains League and 24th overall in the nation out of over 700 summer pre-minor league baseball teams in the country for total attendance.

In November 2012, the city selected Team Cole & Associates to manage the Mustangs for the 2013 season. In October 2015, Team Cole & Associates sold the management contract to the Coastal Plain League for the remaining contract. That expired after the 2019 season. The city reached a management agreement with Martinsville Baseball & Sports to cover the 2020 season. Next P.L.A.N. Athletics became the managing partner of the franchise on September 1, 2021.
