= Radford Rockets =

Minor league baseball team based in Virginia

- 1946–1950; Radford, Virginia

Minor league affiliations
- Class: Class D (1946–1950)
- League: Blue Ridge League (1946–1950)

Major league affiliations
- Team: None

Minor league titles
- League titles (0): None
- Wild card berths (3): 1947; 1948; 1950

Team data
- Name: Radford Rockets (1946–1950)
- Ballpark: Radford High School Park (1946–1950)

The Radford Rockets were a minor league baseball team based in Radford, Virginia. From 1946 to 1950, the Radford Rockets played exclusively as members of the Class D level Blue Ridge League, qualifying for the playoffs on three occasions. The Rockets hosted home minor league games at the Redford High School Park.

== History ==
Minor league baseball was first hosted in Radford, Virginia in 1946. The Radford "Rockets" became charter members of the four–team Class D level Blue Ridge League. The Galax Leafs, Mount Airy Graniteers and Salem Friends joined Radford as charter members in beginning 1946 league play, which commenced on May 1, 1946.

In their first season of play, the 1946 Radford Rockets finished in third place in the final Blue Ridge League standings. The Rockets ended the season with a record of 53–55, playing under manager Ed Martin. The Rockets finished 19.0 games behind the first place Salem Friends/Lenoir Red Sox in the final standings. Radford pitcher Harry Cohick led the Blue Ridge League with 16 wins.

The 1947 Radford Rockets again placed third in the regular season standings, as the four-team Blue Ridge League implemented a new playoff system. Radford ended the regular season with a record of 49–66, playing under managers Eddie Guinther and Sam Gibson and finishing 22.0 games behind the first place Galax Leafs. In the playoffs, Radford lost in first round as the Galax Leafs defeated the Rockets three games to one in their playoff series.

Continuing Blue Ridge League play in 1948, the Radford Rockets again placed third, qualifying for the playoffs as the league expanded to six teams. With a regular season record of 68–55, playing under manager Ray Rudisill, the Radford Rockets finished 7.0 games behind the first place Galax Leafs in the regular season standings. Radford lost in the first round of the playoffs as the Galax Leafs swept Radford in three games in their playoff series. John Moore of Radford led the league with 193 strikeouts, while teammate Clifton Haywood led the league with both 109 runs and 175 total hits.

The Radford Rockets finished last in the six–team 1949 Blue Ridge League. The 1949 Radford Rockets ended the Blue Ridge League regular season in sixth place with a 55–71 record, finishing 13.0 games behind the first place Mt. Airy Graniteers, while playing under managers Bob Thompson, Frank Cirelli and Garland Braxton. Radford did not qualify for the playoffs. Lloyd Wilcox of Radford led the league with 15 home runs, while Radford teammate John Moore led the league with a 2.11 ERA.

In their final season, the 1950 Radford Rockets placed fourth in the Blue Ridge League standings and qualified for the playoffs. The Rockets ended the 1950 season with a record of 52–70, playing under managers Garland Braxton and Stephen Sloboda. Radford finished 34.0 games behind the first place Elkin Blanketeers in the six–team Blue Ridge League final regular season standings. In their final games, the Rockets lost their first round playoff series to the Mount Airy Graniteers 3 games to 1.

The Blue Ridge League permanently folded after the 1950 season. Radford, Virginia has not hosted another minor league franchise.

== The ballpark ==
The Radford Rockets were noted to have played minor league home games at the Radford High School Park. The ballpark was located within Wildwood Park (est. 1929), with the ballpark located on a parcel that adjoins the area behind Radford High School. Today, the Radford High School teams play at a new ballpark constructed in 2011. Radford High School is located at 50 Dalton Drive, Radford, Virginia.

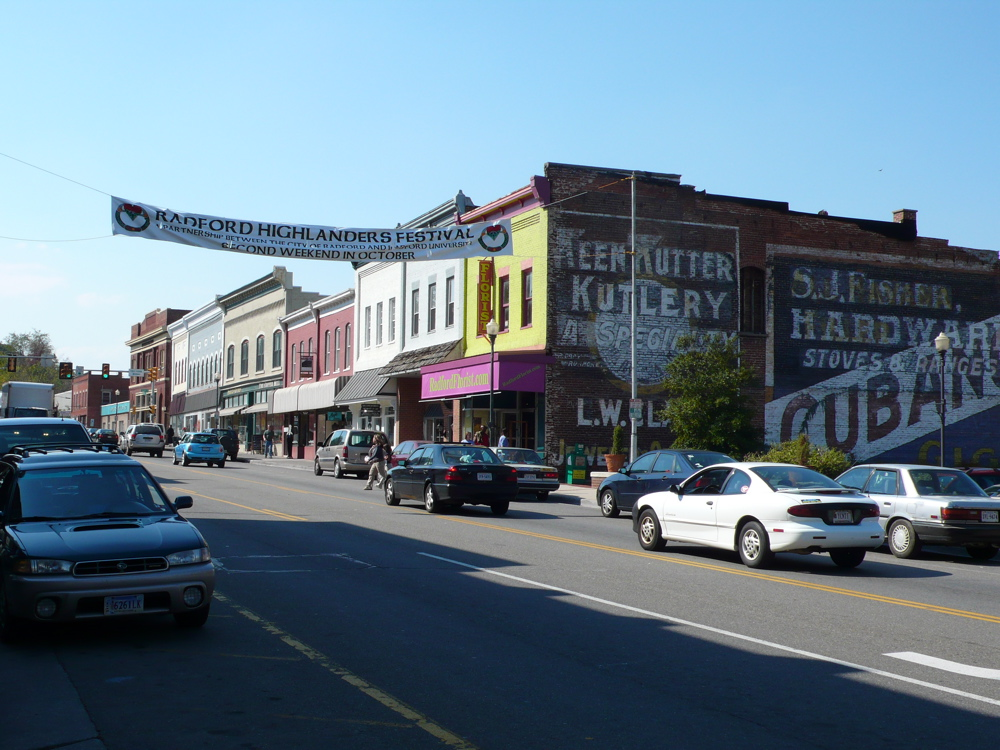
(2008) Main Street. National Register of Historic Places. Radford, Virginia

== Timeline ==
| Year(s) | # Yrs. | Team | Level | League | Ballpark |
|---|---|---|---|---|---|
| 1946–1950 | 5 | Radford Rockets | Class D | Blue Ridge League | Radford High School Park |

== Year–by–year records ==
| Year | Record | Finish | Manager | Playoffs/Notes |
|---|---|---|---|---|
| 1946 | 53–55 | 3rd | Ed Martin | No playoffs held |
| 1947 | 49–66 | 3rd | Eddie Guinther / Sam Gibson | Lost in 1st round |
| 1948 | 68–55 | 3rd | Ray Rudisill | Lost in 1st round |
| 1949 | 55–71 | 6th | Bob Thompson; Frank Cirelli / Garland Braxton | Did not qualify |
| 1950 | 52–70 | 4th | Garland Braxton / Stephen Sloboda | Lost in 1st round |

== Notable alumni ==
- Garland Braxton (1949–1959, MGR) 1928 AL ERA Leader
- Sam Gibson (1947, MGR)
- John Glenn
- Tom Gorman (1946)
- Bob Porterfield (1946) MLB All–Star
- Ed Sadowski (1948, 1950)

=== See also ===
Radford Rockets players
