= Red Smith (American football/baseball) =

American baseball player (1904-1978)

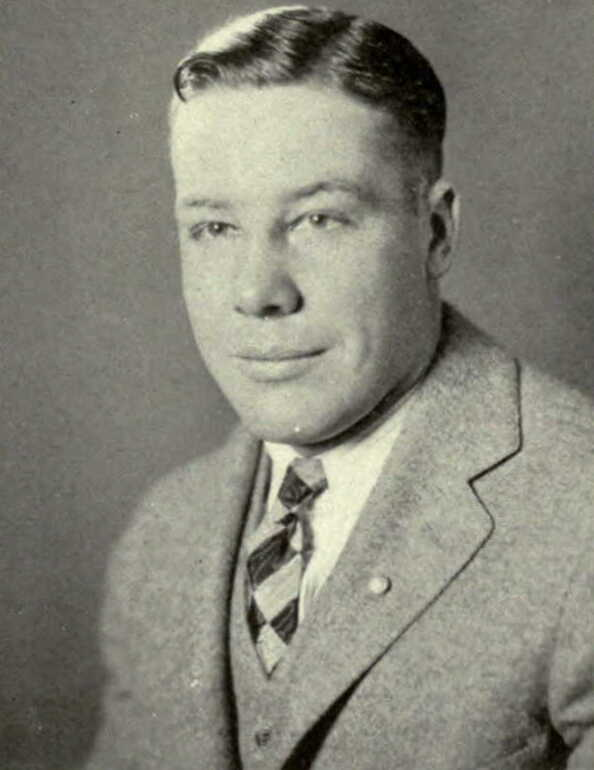
- Smith c. 1927
- Catcher
- Born: May 18, 1904; Brokaw, Wisconsin, U.S.
- Died: March 8, 1978 (aged 73); Sylvania, Ohio, U.S.
- Batted: Right Threw: Right

MLB debut
- May 27, 1927, for the New York Giants

Last MLB appearance
- May 27, 1927, for the New York Giants

MLB statistics
- Games played: 1
- At bats: 0
- Total chances: 1
- Errors: 0
- Stats at Baseball Reference

Teams
- New York Giants (1927)
Football career
Profile
Position	Guard
Career information
College	Notre Dame
Career history
1927	Green Bay Packers
1928	New York Giants
1928	New York Yankees
1929	Green Bay Packers
1930	Newark Tornadoes
1931	New York Giants
Awards and highlights
NFL champion (1929)
Stats at Pro Football Reference

Richard Paul "Red" Smith (May 18, 1904 – March 8, 1978) was an American player and coach in both professional baseball and professional football. A native of Brokaw, Wisconsin, Smith stood 5 ft 9 in (175 cm) tall, and weighed 215 pounds (98 kg). A catcher in baseball, he batted and threw right-handed. He played under three of the early 20th century's most famous American sporting coaches—football's Knute Rockne and Curly Lambeau, and baseball's John McGraw.

After attending Kaukauna High School in Kaukauna, Wisconsin, Smith attended the University of Notre Dame, where he played football for Rockne and captained the Fighting Irish varsity baseball team. In 1927, he turned professional in both sports. He appeared in one game for the New York Giants of baseball's National League, where he recorded one putout and made no errors in the field, but did not record an official at bat. He was then farmed to the Jersey City Skeeters of the AA International League. That turned out to be Smith's only game as a Major League Baseball player, although he played in the minor leagues throughout much of the next decade. In the autumn of 1927, he also turned professional in football with the Green Bay Packers of the National Football League (NFL), where he played five games. In the NFL, he also played for the New York football Giants and the New York football Yankees, appearing in 37 total games and playing in the offensive backfield and as a guard.

Smith continued as a coach in both sports after his playing career ended. He was the head baseball coach at Georgetown University (1930) at Seton Hall University (1931–1932) and an assistant coach for the Packers and Giants from 1936 to 1944.

In baseball, he managed in three Class D minor leagues—the Bi-State League, KITTY League and Wisconsin State League—from 1936 to 1938 and in 1941–42. He also served as a coach for the Milwaukee Brewers of the American Association (1939–40; 1943–44). In 1945, he returned to the majors as a coach for the pennant-winning Chicago Cubs, working under Charlie Grimm, who had been his skipper in Milwaukee. Smith served on the Cub coaching staff through 1949. He then returned to the minor-league Brewers as the team's business manager, briefly filling in as manager in 1952, and moved with the franchise to Toledo, Ohio, when it became the Toledo Sox in 1953. He left baseball in 1955, when the Toledo franchise moved to Wichita, Kansas. He then worked in the brewery industry.

Smith died in a suburb of Toledo in 1978 at age 73. Every January, a fund raising banquet named in Smith's honor is held in Appleton, Wisconsin.
