= Jackie Reid =

Hershel N. "Jackie" Reid (March 27, 1899 in Boyd, Texas – January 5, 1971. Buried in Boyd Cemetery, Texas) was an American long-time minor league baseball pitcher, winning nearly 300 games. He also served as a minor league manager for a few years.

== Playing career ==
Reid began his playing career in 1921, at the age of 22. He won over 15 games in a season ten times, and he won over 20 games in a season three times - in 1923, with the Marshall Indians, with whom he went 20–8 in 235 innings of work; in 1936, when he went a combined 22–8 with a 2.83 ERA in 45 games split between the Jacksonville Jax and Fort Worth Cats; and in 1937, when he went 22-16 for the Fort Worth Cats. Overall, he posted a record of 294–227, and current records indicate that his career ERA was 2.70, however that is inaccurate as multiple seasons in which he pitched are missing ERA information. He played his final season in 1941.

== Managing career ==
He managed the Marshall Indians for part of the 1923 season, replacing incumbent manager Hick Munsell and being replaced by Johnny Jones. He replaced Jimmy Sanders in 1935 as manager of the Jacksonville Jax, leading the league to become league champions that season. In 1938, he replaced Cecil Coombs as manager of the Fort Worth Cats, and in 1948 he replaced Babe Peebles as manager of the Gainesville Owls.
