= Galax Leafs =

- 1946–1950; Galax, Virginia

Minor league affiliations
- Class: Class D (1946–1950)
- League: Blue Ridge League (1946–1950)

Major league affiliations
- Team: New York Giants (1950)

Minor league titles
- League titles (1): 1947
- Conference titles (1): 1948
- Wild card berths (2): 1949; 1950

Team data
- Name: Galax Leafs (1946–1950)
- Ballpark: Felts Park (1946–1950)

The Galax Leafs were a minor league baseball team based in Galax, Virginia. From 1946 to 1950, the Galax Leafs played exclusively as members of the Class D level Blue Ridge League, winning the 1947 championship and 1948 pennant. The Galax Leafs were a minor league affiliate of the New York Giants in 1950. The Leafs hosted minor league home games at Felts Park.

== History ==
Minor league baseball began in Galax, Virginia in 1946, when the Galax "Leafs" became charter members of the four–team Class D level Blue Ridge League. The Mount Airy Graniteers, Radford Rockets and Salem Friends teams joined Galax as charter members in beginning 1946 league play, which commenced on May 1, 1946.

The Galax, Virginia use of the "Leafs" moniker corresponds to local plant life. The "Galax Leaf," a type of green, waxy leaf is indigenous to the region. Today, Galax, Virginia is host of the annual musical Galax & Leaf Festival.

In their first season of play, the 1946 Galax Leafs finished last in the final Blue Ridge League standings. The Rockets ended the season with a record of 30–78, to place fourth, playing under manager Rex Phillips. The Leafs finished the season 42.0 games behind the first place Salem Friends/Lenoir Red Sox team, as no playoffs were held. Joining the Leafs during the season from Mount Airy, Eddie Morgan led the Blue Ridge League with both 16 home runs and 127 RBI.

The 1947 Galax Leafs won the Blue Ridge League championship. As the league implemented a new playoff system, Galax ended the regular season with a record of 77–47 and finished 3.5 games ahead the second place Mount Airy Graniteers, with Eddie Morgan serving as player/manager. In the first round of the playoffs, the Leafs defeated the Radford Rockets 3 games to 1 in their series to advance. In the Finals, the Galax Leafs defeated the Lenoir Red Sox in seven games to win the championship. Player/manager Eddie Morgan hit a league leading .375 with 11 home runs and a league leading 103 RBI in leading Galax to the championship.

Continuing Blue Ridge League play in 1948, the Galax Leafs won the pennant as the league expanded to six teams. With a record of 75–48, playing under manager Harold Kase, the Leafs finished 4.5 games ahead of the second place North Wilkesboro Flashers in the regular season standings. In the first round of the playoffs, Galax defeated the Radford Rockets 3 games to 0 to advance. In the Finals, the Mount Airy Graniteers defeated Galax Leafs 4 games to 3. Pitcher Cecil Warren of Galax led the Blue Ridge league with 21 wins.

The Galax Leafs placed second in the six–team 1949 Blue Ridge League. The Leafs ended the Blue Ridge League regular season with a 66–61 record, finishing 2.5 games behind the first place Mt. Airy Graniteers, while playing under managers Bob Latshaw and Steve Sloboda. In the playoffs, the North Wilkesboro Flashers defeated Galax Leafs 4 games to 2.

In their final season, the 1950 Galax Leafs became a minor league affiliate of the New York Giants. The Leafs ended the 1950 Blue Ridge League regular season with a record of 68–50, playing under manager James Grigg. Galax finished 16.0 games behind the first place Elkin Blanketeers in the six–team Blue Ridge League final regular season standings. In their final games, the Galax Leafs lost their playoff series to Elkin 3 games to 0. The Blue Ridge League permanently folded after the 1950 season. Bob Horan of Galax led the Blue Ridge with 14 home runs, 104 runs and 153 total hits, while Leafs' teammate Mitchell Mozejko led the league with 18 wins.

Galax, Virginia has not hosted another minor league franchise.

== The ballpark ==
The Galax Leafs were noted to have played minor league home games at Felts Park. The ballpark was reportedly a 2,500 seat ballpark. Today, Felts Park is still in use as a public park with ballfields. The park is located at 601 South Main Street, Galax, Virginia.

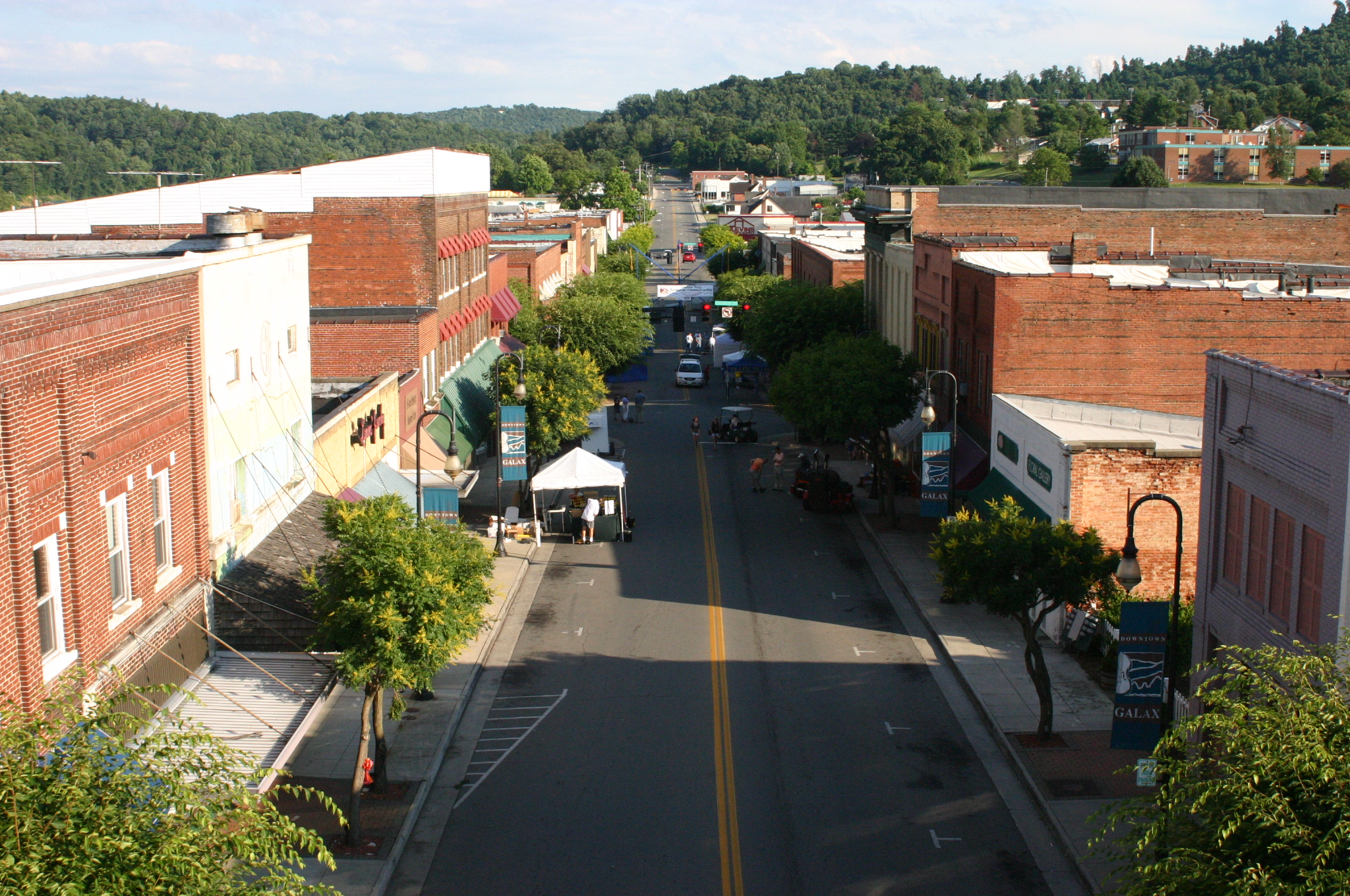
(2007) Main Street. National Register of Historic Places. Galax, Virginia

== Timeline ==
Year(s)	# Yrs.	Team	Level	League	Affiliate	Ballpark
1946–1949	5	Galax Leafs	Class D	Blue Ridge League	None	Felts Park
1950	1	Galax Leafs	Class D	Blue Ridge League	New York Giants	Felts Park

== Year-by-year records ==
Year	Record	Finish	Manager	Playoffs/Notes
1946	30–78	4th	Rex Phillips	No playoffs held
1947	77–47	1st	Eddie Morgan	League champions
1948	75–48	1st	Harold Kase	Lost in finals
1949	66–61	2nd	Bob Latshaw / Steve Sloboda	Lost in 1st round
1950	68–50	3rd	James Grigg	Lost in first round

== Notable alumni ==
- Eddie Morgan (1946), (1947, MGR)
- Jack Warner (1946)

=== See also ===
Galax Leafs players
