= Mount Airy Graniteers =

- (1934-1941, 1946-1950); Mount Airy, North Carolina

Minor league affiliations
- Previous classes: Class D
- Previous leagues: Blue Ridge League (1946–1950); Bi-State League (1934-1941)

Major league affiliations
- Previous teams: Pittsburgh Pirates (1937); Cincinnati Reds (1935-1936)

Minor league titles
- League titles (2): 1948; 1950

Team data
- Previous names: Mount Airy Graniteers (1938-1950); Mount Airy Reds (1935-1937); Mount Airy Graniteers (1934)

The Mount Airy Graniteers were a minor league baseball Class D team that represented the city of Mount Airy, North Carolina. The team played under two different names in two leagues over their 13 non-consecutive seasons spanning 1934–1950. The club joined the Bi-State League for the 1934 season. In 1935, the Graniteers changed its name to the Mount Airy Reds and continued to operate in the league through 1937.

During that span, Mount Airy had affiliation agreements with the Cincinnati Reds (1935–1936) and the Pittsburgh Pirates (1937). Then, the team changed its name again to Mount Airy Graniteers and played uninterrupted until the 1941 season. After that, the city was without a professional club for the next four years.

In 1946, the Graniteers resurrected in a new circuit, the Blue Ridge League (1946–1950), playing there uninterrupted until the 1950 season.

One of their most popular players was outfielder Gene Handley, who won a batting crown title with a .403 batting average in 1936. Other major contribution came from pitcher Bob Bowman, who posted a 30-11 record and a 2.91 ERA from 1946–48, including a 17-4 mark with a 3.29 ERA and 197.0 innings pitched in 1947.

In its storied 13-year history, surviving the ups and downs during wartime and postwar times, the team won championship titles in 1948 and 1950, while reaching the postseason in 1940, 1947 and 1949. Since 1950, no other team based in Mount Airy has participated in professional baseball.

== Season-by-season ==
Year	League	Record	W-L %	Finish	GB	Manager	Playoffs
1934	BIST	33-43	.434	4th of six	19	Cecil Harris; G. Thomas	
1935	BIST	67-47	.588	4th of eight	3½	Mickey Shader	
1936	BIST	53-63	.457	6th of eight	20½	Mickey Shader; Elbert Conway; Frank Packard	
1937	BIST	52-61		5th of eight	16	Walter Novak	
1938	BIST	49-69	.415	6th of eighth	28	Dick Goldberg	
1939	BIST	42-70	.375	8th of eight	27	Guy Lacy; Walter Stephenson	
1940	BIST	63-56	.529	3rd of eight	11	Walter Novack	Lost in first round (vs. Bassett Furnituremakers, 4 Games to 1)
1941	BIST	42-70	.375	5th of six	23	Jimmy Maus	
1946	BLRI	59-45	.567	2nd of four	11	Eddie Morgan	No postseason
1947	BLRI	72-52	.581	2nd of four	3½	Chubby Dean	Lost in first round (vs. Lenoir Red Sox 3 games to 1)
1948	BLRI	65-58	.528	4th of six	10	Noel Casbier	League champions (vs. Galax Leafs 4 games to 3); Won in first round (vs. North Wilkesboro Flashers 3 games to 1)
1949	BLRI	68-58	.540	1st of six	–	Frank Essick; Phil Lundeen; Pete Treece; Okey Flowers	Lost in first round (vs. Wytheville Statesmen 4 games to 2)
1950	BLRI	71-48	.596	2nd of six	13½	Zip Payne; Joe Roseberry	League champions (vs. Elkin Blanketeers, 4 games to 0); Won in first round (vs. Radford Rockets 3 games to 1)

== MLB alumni ==
- Bob Bowman
- Pat Cooper
- Jess Cortazzo
- Woody Crowson
- Chubby Dean
- Vance Dinges
- Bill Donovan
- Joe Gantenbein
- Gene Handley
- Frank Kalin
- Ernie Kish
- Ray Kolp
- Guy Lacy
- Whitey Moore
- Ray Shore
- Walt Stephenson

== See also ==
- Mount Airy Graniteers players
- Mount Airy Reds players
