= Hooker Field =

Baseball stadium in Martinsville, Virginia, United States

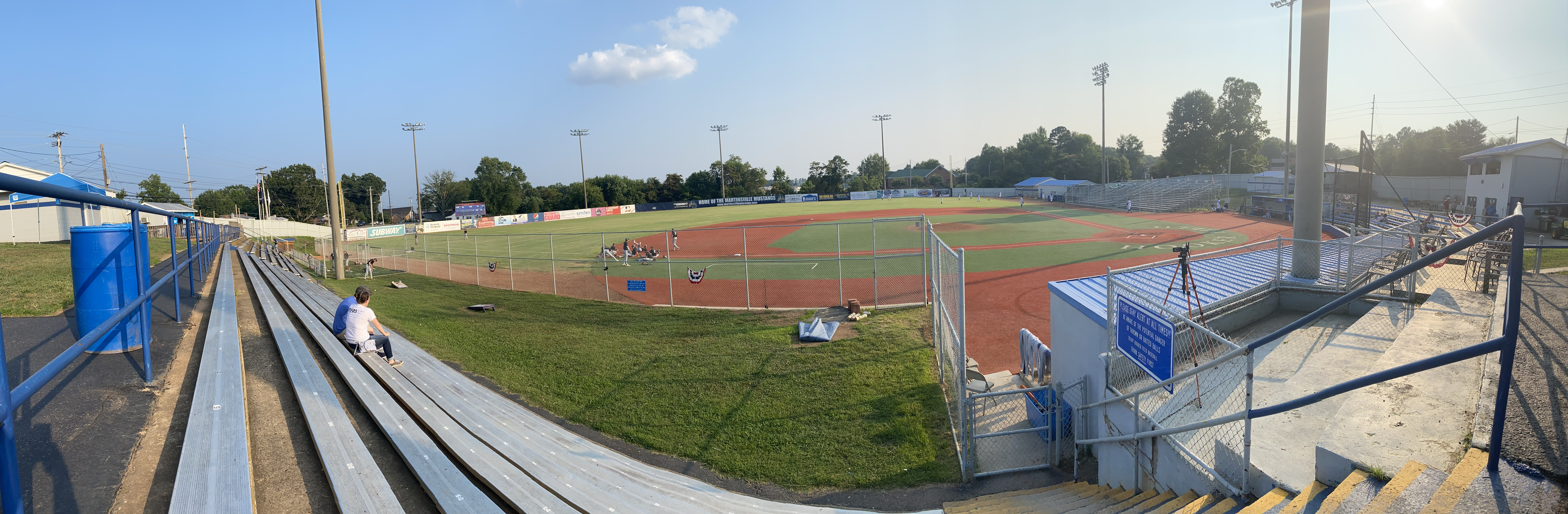

- Location within Virginia Location within the United States
- Interactive map of Hooker Field
- Former names: English Field
- Address: 450 Commonwealth Blvd East; Martinsville, Virginia 24112
- Coordinates: 36.69665°N 79.85391°W
- Owner: City of Martinsville
- Surface: Field turf infield; grass outfield
- Field size: Left field: 330 ft (100 m); Center field: 400 ft (120 m); Right field: 330 ft (100 m)

Construction
- Opened: 1988

Tenants
- Martinsville Phillies (ApL) 1988-1998; Martinsville Astros (ApL) 1999-2003; Martinsville Mustangs (CPL) 2005-present PHCC Patriots (NJCAA DII)

Hooker Field is a stadium in Martinsville, Virginia. It is primarily used for baseball and is the home of the Martinsville Mustangs of the Coastal Plain League and the Patrick & Henry Community College Patriots. The ballpark has a capacity of 3,200 people. It opened in 1988 and was the home field of the Appalachian League Martinsville Phillies from 1988 through 1998 and the Martinsville Astros from 1999 to 2003.
