= Blackie Carter =

American baseball player (1902–1976)

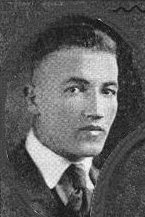
- Outfielder
- Born: September 30, 1902; Langley, South Carolina, U.S.
- Died: September 10, 1976 (aged 73); Greenville, South Carolina, U.S.
- Batted: Right Threw: Right

MLB debut
- October 3, 1925, for the New York Giants

Last MLB appearance
- September 26, 1926, for the New York Giants

MLB statistics
- Batting average: .190 (4-for-21)
- Home runs: 1
- Runs scored: 4
- Stats at Baseball Reference

Teams
- New York Giants (1925–1926)

Otis Leonard "Blackie" Carter (September 30, 1902 – September 10, 1976) was an American professional baseball player. He played briefly in Major League Baseball for the New York Giants during 1925 and 1926, appearing in six games.

Carter attended Furman University, where he was captain of the 1923 Furman Purple Hurricane football team. He had a lengthy minor league career from 1923 to 1940, during which he appeared in over 1700 games. From 1933 to 1940, Carter was minor-league player-manager in the Piedmont League, Bi-State League, South Atlantic League and North Carolina State League. He was also a scout for the Brooklyn Dodgers. After his baseball career, he worked for an industrial belt manufacturing company in Kingsport, Tennessee. Carter died in 1976; he was survived by his wife and three daughters.
