= Leaksville–Draper–Spray Triplets =

Minor League Baseball team

- 1934–1948; (1934-1942, 1945-1948); Draper, North Carolina

Minor league affiliations
- Class: Class D (1934-1948)
- League: Bi-State League (1934-1942); Carolina League (1946-1947); Blue Ridge League (1948)

The Class D Leaksville–Draper–Spray Triplets was a Minor League Baseball team who played in three different leagues between the 1934 and 1948 seasons. The team was a combination of three separate towns from North Carolina (now Eden, Rockingham County, North Carolina).

The Triplets played from 1934 through 1942 in the Bi-State League.

The team joined the Carolina League in 1945, playing there three years before moving to the Blue Ridge League in 1948. In June of that year, the team moved to the town of Abingdon, Virginia, to become the Abingdon Triplets, folding at the end of the season.

== Team history ==
Year	Record	Finish	Manager	Playoffs
1934	32-45	5th	Oscar Langley; Blackie Carter	
1935	71-44	1st	Blackie Carter	
1936	65-51	3rd	Clyde Sukeforth	Lost Finals
1937	41-73	8th	Clarence Blethen; Dave Lawless; Charles Willis	
1938	37-82	8th	Joe Feori	
1939	67-48	2nd	Arnold Anderson	Lost finals
1940	56-63	6th	Arnold Anderson; Jimmy Mundo	
1941	64-46	1st	Tim Murchison; Wes Ferrell	Lost in 1st round
1942	57-66	5th	Zip Payne	
1945	66-70	5th	Jackie Warner	
1946	57-85	8th	Mickey O'Neil	
1947	59-82	7th	George Granger	
1948	43-81	6th	Bernard Loman; Joe Santomauro	

== Affiliations ==
Brooklyn Dodgers	1936
Wilkes-Barre Barons	1937
Cleveland Indians	1939
Chicago Cubs	1945

== Major League Baseball alumni ==
- Tal Abernathy
- Fred Archer
- Blackie Carter
- George Cisar
- Jess Cortazzo
- Charlie Cuellar
- Wes Ferrell
- Joe Frazier
- John Glenn
- Dixie Howell
- George Jeffcoat
- Jim Mooney
- Bill Nagel
- Jim Pearce
- Ray Poat
- Carr Smith
- Ray Shore
- Rocky Stone
- Clyde Sukeforth
- Forrest Thompson
- Woody Williams

== Sources ==
- Minor League Baseball Standings: All North American Leagues, through 1999 – Benjamin Barrett Sumner. Publisher: McFarland & Company, 2000. Format: Hardcover, 726pp. Language: English. ISBN 0-7864-0781-6
- Encyclopedia of Minor League Baseball: The Official Record of Minor League Baseball – Lloyd Johnson, Miles Wolff, Steve McDonald. Publisher: Baseball America, 1997. Format: Paperback, 672pp. Language: English. ISBN 0-9637189-7-5
