= Jimmy Sanders (baseball) =

James Raburn Sanders (September 3, 1902 – December 1975) was a successful minor league baseball player and manager. He was born in Penfield, Georgia, United States. In 1935, he was given the title of United States minor league baseball batting champion for the year of 1934. He also received a Louisville Slugger trophy because of this.

== Playing career ==
Sanders played from 1923 to 1939, hitting .314 in 1,849 games. He collected 2,150 hits – 405 of which were doubles, 151 of which were triples and 101 of which were home runs. He also stole 368 bases. He led the 1926 South Atlantic League with 42 stolen bases, and the 1928 Central League with 29 stolen bases. As well, he led the 1927 Western Association with 14 triples. In 1934, Sanders led all of the minor leagues with a .423 average.

== Managerial career ==
Sanders managed from 1934 to 1939. He managed the Martinsville Manufacturers in 1934 and 1936, the Jacksonville Jax in 1935, the Daytona Beach Islanders in 1937 and 1938 and the New Iberia Cardinals from 1938 to 1940. He was replaced by Jackie Reid in 1935 and by Harrison Wickel in 1938. As Wickel took Sander's job with the Islanders in 1938, Sanders took Wickel's job with the Cardinals, so effectively it was a managerial trade.
