= Dave Odom (baseball) =

American baseball player (1918–1987)

- Pitcher
- Born: June 5, 1918; Dinuba, California, US
- Died: November 19, 1987 (aged 69); Myrtle Beach, South Carolina, US
- Batted: Right Threw: Right

MLB debut
- May 31, 1943, for the Boston Braves

Last MLB appearance
- September 13, 1943, for the Boston Braves

MLB statistics
- Win–loss record: 0–3
- Earned run average: 5.27
- Strikeouts: 17
- Stats at Baseball Reference

Teams
- Boston Braves (1943)

David Everett Odom (June 5, 1918 – November 19, 1987) was an American professional baseball pitcher. He played part of the 1943 season in Major League Baseball (MLB) for the Boston Braves.

He studied at USC, Chapman College, and finally at NC State.

Odom began playing professional baseball in 1936 at age 18 for the Class D Jamestown Jimmies of the Northern League. He completed his baseball career with the Class C Greensboro Patriots of the Carolina League 10 years later.

== Personal life ==
Odom married Biddie Biddix on September 27, 1939.
