= Wytheville Statesmen =

Minor league baseball team in Virginia, US

The Wytheville Statesmen were a minor league baseball team located in Wytheville, Virginia. The Statesmen played as members of the Appalachian League from 1949 to 1950 and 1953 to 1955.

== Affiliations ==
The Statesmen were affiliated with the following major league teams:

Year	Affiliation(s)
1954	Baltimore Orioles
1953	St. Louis Browns
