= Elkin Blanketeers =

- 1949–1952; (Elkin, North Carolina)

Minor league affiliations
- Class: Class D (1949–1952)
- League: Blue Ridge League (1949–1950); North Carolina State League (1951–1952)

Major league affiliations
- Team: None

Minor league titles
- League titles (0): None
- Conference titles (1): 1950
- Wild card berths (2): 1951; 1952

Team data
- Name: Elkin Blanketeers (1949–1952)
- Ballpark: Elkin Memorial Park (1949–1952)

The Elkin Blanketeers were a minor league baseball team based in Elkin, North Carolina. The Blanketeers played as members of the Class D level Blue Ridge League from 1949 to 1950 and North Carolina State League from 1951 to 1952, winning the 1950 pennant.

Elkin hosted minor league home games at Elkin Memorial Park. A Blanketeers player was married at home plate before a game in 1950.

== History ==
The 1949 Elkin Blanketeers were the first minor league baseball team in Elkin, North Carolina. The minor league team was directly preceded by the local semipro team, the Chatham Blanketeers. The Chatham Manufacturing Company was a primary local business that engaged in the manufacturing of blankets. A top selling product was the wollen "Chatham Blanket," corresponding with the Eklin use of the "Blanketeers." moniker."

The Elkin Blanketeers began play as members of the Class D level Blue Ridge League in 1949. Harvey Laffoon, publisher of The Elkin Tribune newspaper, was a principal owner of the franchise.

The 1949 Elkin Blanketeers ended their first Blue Ridge League season with a 62–65 record. Elkin placed 5th in the six–team Blue Ridge League regular season standings, finishing 6.5 games behind the 1st place Mt. Airy Graniteers. Wayne Harris served as manager, his first of three seasons managing the team. The minor league Blanketeers continued to play at Elkin Memorial Park and had 1949 season attendance of 33,000, an average of 520 per home game.

The 1950 Elkin Blanketeers won the Blue Ridge League Pennant in the final season for the league. The Blanketeers ended the 1950 season with a record of 82–32, placing 1st in the Blue Ridge League regular season standings, playing under manager Wayne Harris. Elkin finished 13.5 games ahead of the 2nd place Mt. Airy Graniteers. In the Playoffs, Elkin swept the Galax Leafs in three games. In the Finals, the Mount Airy Graniteers swept the Elkin Blanketeers in four games. Season attendance at Elkin Memorial Park was 21,578 an average of 379. The Blue Ridge League folded after the 1950 season, as did the Elkin franchise.

In mid-season 1951, the Elkin Blanketeers were revived. On July 18, 1951, the Landis Spinners of the Class D level North Carolina State League relocated to Elkin and the Elkin Blanketeers resumed play. The Landis Spinners had a 44–36 record at the time of the move.

The 1951 Landis Spinners/Elkin Blanketeers team finished the North Carolina State League regular season with an overall record of 67–59, placing 3rd in the eight–team league, finishing 23.0 games behind the champion High Point-Thomasville Hi-Toms. Fred Chapman served as manager in both locations. In the 1951 Playoffs, High Point-Thomasville defeated Landis/Elkin 4 games to 1. Overall season attendance was 22,780.

In their final season, The 1952 Elkin Blanketeers finished the regular season with a record of 45–64. Elkin placed 4th in the North Carolina State Leagues, which had reduced to six teams. Wayne Harris returned as the manager. In the Playoffs, the Mooresville Moors defeated Elkin Blanketeers 4 games to 1. The final season of minor league play Elkin Memorial Park saw season attendance of 16,322, an average of 299 per contest. The North Carolina State League permanently folded after the 1952 season.

Elkin, North Carolina has not hosted another minor league franchise.

== The ballpark ==
The Elkin Blanketeers were noted to have played minor league home games at Elkin Memorial Park. The ballpark had a capacity of 1,500 in 1950. In 1950, the ballpark hosted the wedding of Blanketeers player Shorty Brown, who married Jo Barnette at home plate. Elkin Memorial Park was located at Memorial Park Drive & James Street, Elkin, North Carolina.

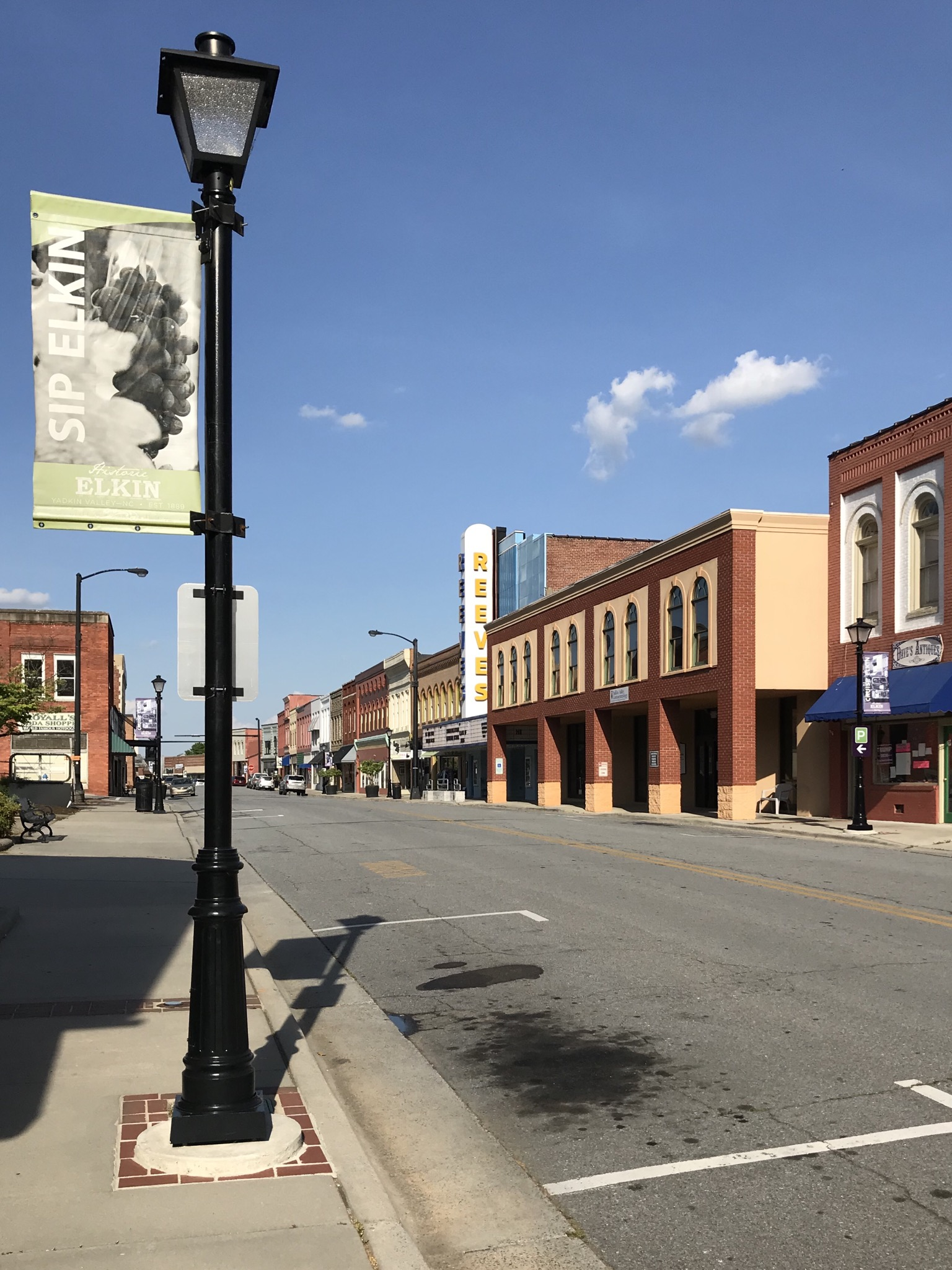
(2020) Downtown. Elkin, North Carolina.

== Timeline ==
Year(s)	# Yrs.	Team	Level	League	Ballpark
1949–1950	2	Elkin Blanketeers	Class D	Blue Ridge League	Memorial Park
1951–1952	2	Elkin Blanketeers	Class D	North Carolina State League	Memorial Park

== Year–by–year records ==
Year	Record	Finish	Manager	Playoffs/Notes
1949	62–65	7th	Wayne Harris	Did not qualify
1950	82–32	1st	Wayne Harris	Lost League Finals
1951	67–59	3rd	Fred Chapman	Lost in 1st Round; Landis (44–36) moved to Elkin July 18
1952	45–64	4th	Wayne Harris	Lost in 1st Round

== Notable alumni ==
- Fred Chapman (1951, MGR)
- Van Fletcher (1949–1950)
- John Pyecha (1950)

== See also ==
Elkin Blanketeers players
