= Roy Vaughn =

American baseball player (1911–1937)

- Pitcher
- Born: September 4, 1911; Sedalia, Missouri
- Died: March 1, 1937 (aged 25); Martinsville, Virginia
- Batted: Both Threw: Right

MLB debut
- July 1, 1934, for the Philadelphia Athletics

Last MLB appearance
- July 5, 1934, for the Philadelphia Athletics

MLB statistics
- Games played: 2
- Innings pitched: 4.1
- Earned run average: 2.08
- Stats at Baseball Reference

Teams
- Philadelphia Athletics (1934)

Clarence LeRoy Vaughn (September 4, 1911 – March 1, 1937) was a pitcher in Major League Baseball. He played for the Philadelphia Athletics in 1934.
