= Tim Murchison =

American baseball player (1896–1962)

- Pitcher
- Born: October 8, 1896; Liberty, North Carolina, U.S.
- Died: October 20, 1962 (aged 66); Liberty, North Carolina, U.S.
- Batted: Right Threw: Left

MLB debut
- June 21, 1917, for the St. Louis Cardinals

Last MLB appearance
- May 3, 1920, for the Cleveland Indians

MLB statistics
- Games played: 3
- Innings pitched: 6
- Earned run average: 0.00
- Stats at Baseball Reference

Teams
- St. Louis Cardinals (1917); Cleveland Indians (1920)

Thomas Malcolm Murchison (October 8, 1896 – October 20, 1962) was an American Major League Baseball pitcher who played for two seasons. He pitched for the St. Louis Cardinals in 1917 and the Cleveland Indians in 1920.

Murchison attended Sylvan High School in Snow Camp, North Carolina, where he played on the schools baseball team. Following high school, he played baseball at Guilford College for two years in 1915 and 1917, where he was teammates with Tom Zachary. The 1917 Guilford College baseball team finished as the state collegiate champions, going 12–1 overall. Following his last Major League Baseball game, he embarked on a long career as a player and manager in semipro baseball.
