= Woody Williams (infielder) =

American baseball player (1912–1995)

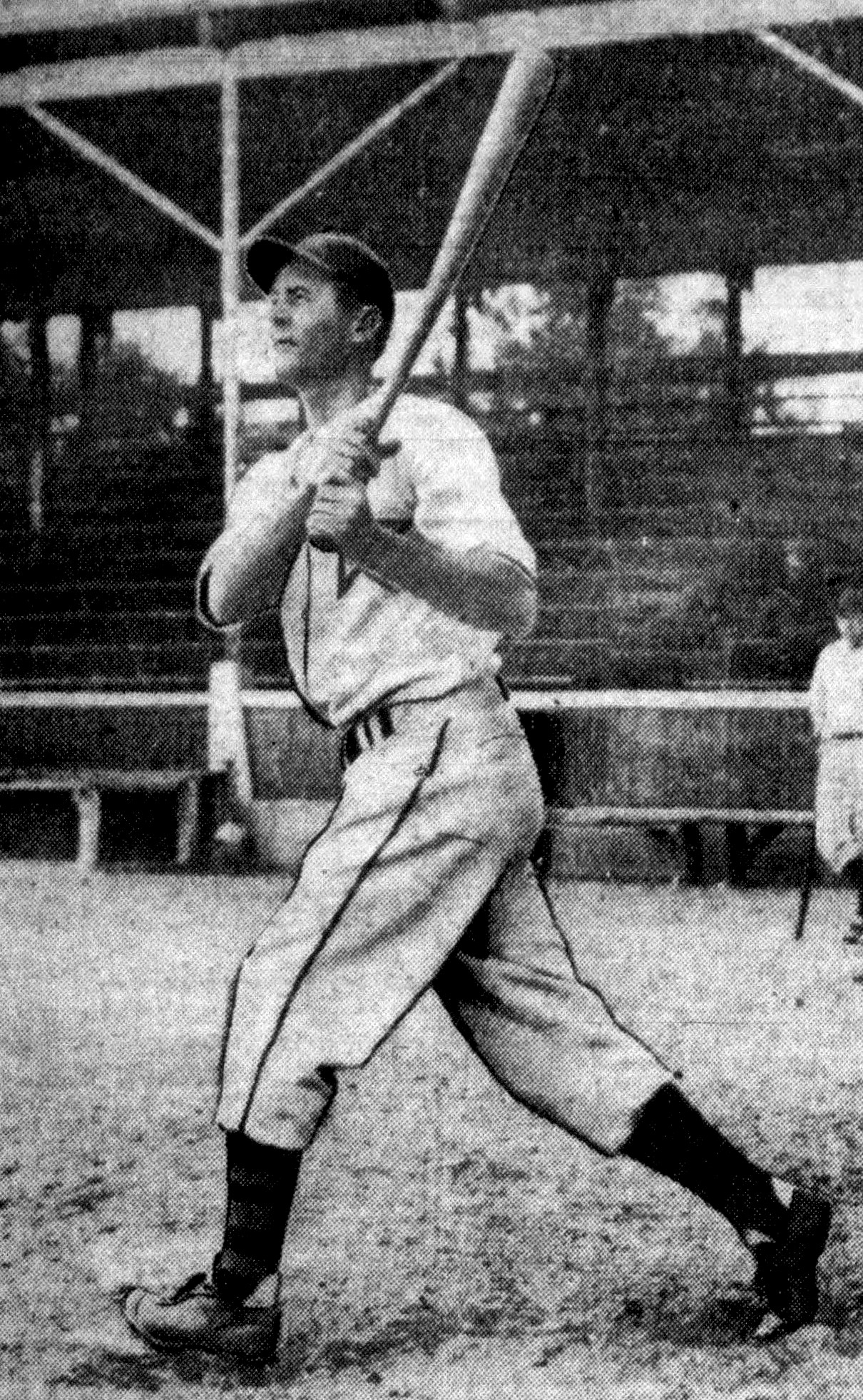
- Williams with the Hollywood Stars, circa 1946
- Second baseman
- Born: August 21, 1912; Pamplin, Virginia, U.S.
- Died: February 24, 1995 (aged 82); Appomattox, Virginia, U.S.
- Batted: Right Threw: Right

MLB debut
- September 5, 1938, for the Brooklyn Dodgers

Last MLB appearance
- September 30, 1945, for the Cincinnati Reds

MLB statistics
- Batting average: .250
- Hits: 314
- Runs batted in: 79
- Stats at Baseball Reference

Teams
- Brooklyn Dodgers (1938); Cincinnati Reds (1943–1945)

Woodrow Wilson Williams (August 21, 1912 – February 24, 1995) was an American Major League Baseball second baseman who played for the Brooklyn Dodgers and Cincinnati Reds from 1938 to 1945. In 1949, he was the manager of the Poughkeepsie Chiefs in the Colonial League.
