= Mayodan Millers =

The Mayodan Millers was the final and primary name of the Bi-State League baseball team based in Mayodan, North Carolina, United States that played from 1934 to 1941. They were affiliated with the Philadelphia Phillies in 1939. The franchise previously played in the Bi-State League as the Mayodan Senators (1934, 1937), Mayodan Mills (1935) and Mayodan Orphans (1936).
