= Dixie Parker =

American baseball player (1895-1972)

- Catcher
- Born: April 24, 1895; Forest Home, Alabama, U.S.
- Died: May 15, 1972 (aged 77); Tuscaloosa, Alabama, U.S.
- Batted: Left Threw: Right

MLB debut
- July 28, 1923, for the Philadelphia Phillies

Last MLB appearance
- October 6, 1923, for the Philadelphia Phillies

MLB statistics
- Games played: 4
- At-bats: 5
- Hits: 1
- RBI: 1
- Batting average: .200
- Stats at Baseball Reference

Teams
- Philadelphia Phillies (1923)

Douglas Woolley Parker (April 24, 1895 – May 15, 1972) was an American catcher in Major League Baseball who played for the Philadelphia Phillies during the 1923 season. Listed at 5' 11", Weight: 160 lb., Parker batted and threw right handed. He was born in Forest Home, Alabama.

Parker played briefly for the 1923 Phillies, forming part of a catcher tandem that included Butch Henline, Dink O'Brien and Jimmy Wilson.

He also spent parts of 16 minor league seasons spanning 1918–1941, while playing or managing for 17 teams in 13 different leagues.

Parker died in Tuscaloosa, Alabama, at the age of 77.
