= Bassett Furnituremakers =

- 1935–1950; (1935–1940, 1950); Bassett, Virginia

Minor league affiliations
- Previous classes: Class D (1935–1940, 1950)
- Previous leagues: Bi-State League (1935–1940); Blue Ridge League (1950)

Major league affiliations
- Previous teams: Brooklyn Dodgers (1940); Cincinnati Reds (1939); New York Yankees (1936–1937)

Minor league titles
- League titles: 3 1936, 1937, 1938

Team data
- Previous names: Bassett Furnituremakers (1935–1940); Bassett Statesman (1950)
- Previous parks: Riverside Park (1935–1940, 1950)

The Bassett Furnituremakers were a minor league baseball team based in Bassett, Virginia, USA that played from 1935 to 1940. Bassett was a member of the Bi-State League (1935–1940) and the Blue Ridge League (1950). Bassett was an affiliate of the Brooklyn Dodgers (1940), Cincinnati Reds (1939) and New York Yankees (1936–1937). Baseball Hall of Fame member Phil Rizzuto played for Bassett in 1937, his first professional season.

== History ==
The Bassett Furnituremakers made the league playoffs in each year of their existence. Bassett won three consecutive league championship from 1936 to 1938. They won the championships under a different manager – the 1936 Bi-State League Championship under Ernie Jenkins, the 1937 championship under Ray White and the third, in 1938, under Walter Novak.

From 1936 to 1937, the Bassett Furnituremakers were an affiliate of the New York Yankees. In 1938 Bassett was an affiliate of the Cincinnati Reds, and in 1939, the Brooklyn Dodgers.

They were one of only two baseball teams to ever play professionally in Bassett. They were followed in 1950 by the Bassett Statesman, who played a partial 1950 season in the Class D Blue Ridge League. The Wytheville Statesman moved to Bassett on July 27, 1950 due to the polio epidemic.

Baseball Hall of Fame shortstop Phil Rizzuto played for the 1937 Bassett Furnituremakers. In his first professional season, Rizzuto helped Bassett to the league championship, hitting .310 with 5 home runs in 64 games at age 19. Of his season in Bassett, Rizzuto remarked, "The people were so nice, but they couldn’t understand me with my Brooklyn accent, and I couldn’t understand them with their Southern accent."

== The ballpark ==
Bassett teams played at Riverside Park. Riverside Park had a capacity of 1,800 (1939). The field dimensions were (Left, Center, Right) 325-387-325 (1939). The ballpark was located on Riverside Drive.

== Notable alumni ==
- Phil Rizzuto (1937) Inducted Baseball Hall of Fame, 1994
- Al Gettel (1937)
- Clyde Vollmer (1939-1940)
- Mickey Witek (1935)
