= 1937 Washington Senators season =

1937 Washington Senators
- League: American League
- Ballpark: Griffith Stadium
- City: Washington, D.C.
- Record: 73–80 (.477)
- League place: 6th
- Owners: Clark Griffith and William Richardson
- Managers: Bucky Harris
- Radio: WJSV (Arch McDonald)

The 1937 Washington Senators won 73 games, lost 80, and finished in sixth place in the American League. They were managed by Bucky Harris and played home games at Griffith Stadium.

== Offseason ==
- January 29, 1937: Red Kress, Carl Reynolds and cash were traded by the Senators to the Minneapolis Millers for Jimmy Wasdell.

== Regular season ==
=== Season standings ===
American League
Team	W	L	Pct.	GB	Home	Road
New York Yankees	102	52	.662	—	57‍–‍20	45‍–‍32
Detroit Tigers	89	65	.578	13	49‍–‍28	40‍–‍37
Chicago White Sox	86	68	.558	16	47‍–‍30	39‍–‍38
Cleveland Indians	83	71	.539	19	50‍–‍28	33‍–‍43
Boston Red Sox	80	72	.526	21	44‍–‍29	36‍–‍43
Washington Senators	73	80	.477	28½	43‍–‍35	30‍–‍45
Philadelphia Athletics	54	97	.358	46½	27‍–‍50	27‍–‍47
St. Louis Browns	46	108	.299	56	25‍–‍51	21‍–‍57

=== Record vs. opponents ===
1937 American League record Sources:
Team	BOS	CWS	CLE	DET	NYY	PHA	SLB	WSH
Boston	—	10–12	11–11	12–10–1	7–15	17–3	15–7	8–14–1
Chicago	12–10	—	10–12	8–14	9–13	15–7	18–4	14–8
Cleveland	11–11	12–10	—	11–11	7–15–1	13–9	18–4–1	11–11
Detroit	10–12–1	14–8	11–11	—	9–13	14–8	15–7	16–6
New York	15–7	13–9	15–7–1	13–9	—	14–8	16–6–1	16–6–1
Philadelphia	3–17	7–15	9–13	8–14	8–14	—	11–11	8–13–3
St. Louis	7–15	4–18	4–18–1	7–15	6–16–1	11–11	—	7–15
Washington	14–8–1	8–14	11–11	6–16	6–16–1	13–8–3	15–7	—

=== Notable transactions ===
- April 4, 1937: Al Simmons was purchased by the Senators from the Detroit Tigers for $15,000.
- May 2, 1937: Shanty Hogan was traded by the Senators to Indianapolis Indians for Johnny Riddle. The trade was voided on May 20, with the players returned to their original teams.
- June 21, 1937: Shanty Hogan was released by the Senators.

=== Roster ===
1937 Washington Senators
Roster
Pitchers: -- Red Anderson; 18 Pete Appleton; 11 Joe Cascarella; 21,32 Ken Chase; 14 Syd Cohen; 15 Jimmie DeShong; 12 Wes Ferrell; 16 Carl Fischer; 20 Bucky Jacobs; 35 Joe Kohlman; 36 Joe Krakauskas; 20,33 Dick Lanahan; 19 Ed Linke; 12 Bobo Newsom; 11,21 Bill Phebus; 17 Monte Weaver	Catchers: 10 Herb Crompton; 10 Rick Ferrell; 20 Milt Gray; 38 Mike Guerra; 8 Shanty Hogan; 9 Wally Millies; -- Johnny Riddle; 26,88 Alex Sabo; Infielders: 16 Jimmy Bloodworth; 27 Ossie Bluege; 7 Joe Kuhel; 2 Buddy Lewis; -- Jerry Lynn; 24 John Mihalic; 1 Buddy Myer; 5 Cecil Travis; -- Frank Trechock; 26 Jimmy Wasdell	Outfielders: 4 Mel Almada; 25 George Case; 4 Ben Chapman; 25 Jesse Hill; 3 Al Simmons; 31 Fred Sington; 6 John Stone	Manager: 30 Bucky Harris; Coaches: 28 Nick Altrock; 29 Earl McNeely

== Player stats ==
= Indicates team leader

=== Batting ===
==== Starters by position ====
Note: Pos = Position; G = Games played; AB = At bats; H = Hits; Avg. = Batting average; HR = Home runs; RBI = Runs batted in

Pos	Player	G	AB	H	Avg.	HR	RBI
C	Rick Ferrell	86	279	64	.229	1	32
1B	Joe Kuhel	136	547	155	.283	6	61
2B	Buddy Myer	125	430	126	.293	1	65
SS	Cecil Travis	135	526	181	.344	3	66
3B	Buddy Lewis	156	668	210	.314	10	79
OF	Al Simmons	103	419	117	.279	8	84
OF	Mel Almada	100	433	134	.309	4	33
OF	John Stone	139	542	179	.330	6	88

==== Other batters ====
Note: G = Games played; AB = At bats; H = Hits; Avg. = Batting average; HR = Home runs; RBI = Runs batted in

Player	G	AB	H	Avg.	HR	RBI
Fred Sington	78	228	54	.237	3	36
Wally Millies	59	179	40	.223	0	28
Ben Chapman	35	130	34	.262	0	12
Ossie Bluege	42	127	36	.283	1	13
Jimmy Wasdell	32	110	28	.255	2	12
John Mihalic	38	107	27	.252	0	8
Jesse Hill	33	92	20	.217	1	4
George Case	22	90	26	.289	0	11
Shanty Hogan	21	66	10	.152	0	5
Jimmy Bloodworth	15	50	11	.220	0	8
Johnny Riddle	8	26	7	.269	0	3
Milt Gray	2	6	0	.000	0	0
Frank Trechock	1	4	2	.500	0	0
Herb Crompton	2	3	1	.333	0	0
Mike Guerra	3	3	0	.000	0	0
Jerry Lynn	1	3	2	.667	0	0
Alex Sabo	1	0	0	----	0	0

=== Pitching ===
==== Starting pitchers ====
Note: G = Games pitched; IP = Innings pitched; W = Wins; L = Losses; ERA = Earned run average; SO = Strikeouts

Player	G	IP	W	L	ERA	SO
Jimmie DeShong	37	264.1	14	15	4.90	86
Wes Ferrell	25	207.2	11	13	3.94	92
Monte Weaver	30	188.2	12	9	4.20	44
Bobo Newsom	11	67.2	3	4	5.85	39
Bill Phebus	6	40.2	3	2	2.21	12
Joe Krakauskas	5	40.0	4	1	2.70	18
Joe Kohlman	2	13.0	1	0	4.15	3

==== Other pitchers ====
Note: G = Games pitched; IP = Innings pitched; W = Wins; L = Losses; ERA = Earned run average; SO = Strikeouts

Player	G	IP	W	L	ERA	SO
Pete Appleton	35	168.0	8	15	4.39	62
Ed Linke	36	128.2	6	1	5.60	61
Ken Chase	14	76.1	4	3	4.13	43
Carl Fischer	17	72.0	4	5	4.38	30
Joe Cascarella	10	32.1	0	5	8.07	10
Dick Lanahan	6	11.1	0	1	12.71	2
Red Anderson	2	10.2	0	1	6.75	3

==== Relief pitchers ====
Note: G = Games pitched; W = Wins; L = Losses; SV = Saves; ERA = Earned run average; SO = Strikeouts

Player	G	W	L	SV	ERA	SO
Syd Cohen	33	2	4	4	3.11	22
Bucky Jacobs	11	1	1	0	4.84	8

== Farm system ==
Level	Team	League	Manager
A1	Chattanooga Lookouts	Southern Association	Clyde Milan, Bill Rodgers and Calvin Griffith
A	Trenton Senators	New York–Pennsylvania League	Bud Shaney and Spencer Abbott
B	Charlotte Hornets	Piedmont League	Lee Head, Bill Rodgers and Alex McColl
B	Jacksonville Tars	Sally League	Alex McColl and Bill Steinecke
B	Selma Cloverleafs	Southeastern League	Babe Ganzel
D	Mayodan Senators	Bi-State League	Harry Daughtry
D	Salisbury Indians	Eastern Shore League	Jake Flowers
D	Sanford Lookouts	Florida State League	Bill Rodgers and Lee Head

LEAGUE CHAMPIONS: Salisbury
