= Goldsboro Giants =

Minor league baseball team Goldsboro, North Carolina, US

- 1908–1910; Goldsboro, North Carolina

Minor league affiliations
- Class: Class D (1908–1910)
- League: Eastern Carolina League (1908–1910)

Major league affiliations
- Team: None

Minor league titles
- League titles (0): None

Team data
- Name: Goldsboro Giants (1908–1910)
- Ballpark: Goldsboro Athletic Park (1908–1910)

The Goldsboro Giants were a minor league baseball team based in Goldsboro, North Carolina. From 1908 to 1910, the "Giants" played exclusively as members of the Class D level Eastern Carolina League.

The Goldsboro Giants teams hosted home minor league home games at the Goldsboro Athletic Park.

== History ==
=== 1908: Charter members Eastern Carolina League ===
In 1908, the Giants were the first minor league team based in Goldsboro. The Goldsboro Giants began minor league play, when the team became charter members of the six–team, Class D level Eastern Carolina League. The Kinston, New Burn, Raleigh Red Birds, Wilmington Sailors and Wilson Tobacconists teams joined Goldsboro in beginning league play on June 8, 1908.

The Goldsboro franchise was formed with funds raised by the "Goldsboro Athletic Association" with A. W. Edgerton serving as president of the association.

Beginning Eastern Caroling League play in 1908, the Giants did not qualify for the playoffs in a split season schedule. The Giants ended the Eastern Carolina League regular season with an overall record of 29–28, placing third in the final standings and finishing 8 ½games behind Wilson, with E. E. Kling serving as manager. The league played a split-season schedule and Wilmington won second half pennant, meeting the Wilson Tobacconists, winners of the first half pennant in the finals. The finals were won by Wilson.

=== 1909 & 1910: Eastern Carolina League ===
Continuing Eastern Caroling League play in their second season of play, the Giants finished in fifth place under manager H. E. Kling. Goldsboro ended the 1909 season with a record of 43–46 to finish 7.0 games behind the first place Wilson Tobacconists (50–39) in the final standings of the six–team league. Goldsboro pitcher Harry Otis led the Eastern Carolina League with 19 wins.

In their final season of play, the 1910 Giants again placed fifth in the Eastern Carolina League overall standings. Goldsboro ended the season with a record of 39-44 and did not qualify for the playoff in the split season format. The Giants were managed by M. J. Kelley and finished 7½ games behind the first place Fayetteville Highlanders in the overall standings. Fayetteville won the playoff over the Rocky Mount Railroaders. The Giants' Curly Brown won the Eastern Carolina League batting championship, hitting .290.

The Eastern Carolina League folded after the 1910 season, before the league reformed in 1928. The Goldsboro Manufacturers resumed minor league play in Goldsboro when the Eastern Carolina league reformed.

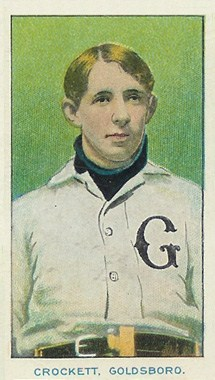
(1910) Davey Crockett. Goldsboro baseball card

== The ballpark ==
The Goldsboro Giants hosted home minor league home games at the Goldsboro Athletic Park. The team drew crowds of up to 1,200, with most crowds reported to be around 400.

== Timeline ==
Year(s)	# Yrs.	Team	Level	League	Ballpark
1908–1910	3	Goldsboro Giants	Class D	Eastern Carolina League	Goldsboro Athletic Park

== Year–by–year records ==
Year	Record	Finish	Manager	Playoffs/Notes
1908	29–28	3rd	E. E. Kling	Did not qualify
1909	43–46	5th	H. E Kling	No playoffs held
1910	39–44	5th	M. J. Kelley	Did not qualify

== Notable alumni ==
- Curly Brown (1910)
- Davey Crockett (1909–1910)
- Charlie Gettig (1900)
- Mike Handiboe (1910)
- Ray Morgan (1910)
- Harry Otis (1909)
- Steve Yerkes (1908)

== See also ==
- Goldsoro Giants players
