= Davey Crockett (baseball) =

American baseball player (1875–1961)

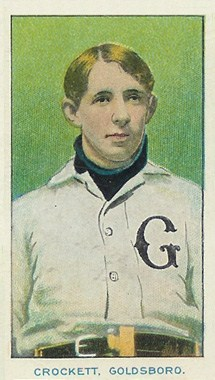
- First baseman
- Born: October 5, 1875; Roanoke, Virginia, U.S.
- Died: February 23, 1961 (aged 85); Charlottesville, Virginia, U.S.
- Batted: Left Threw: Right

MLB debut
- July 11, 1901, for the Detroit Tigers

Last MLB appearance
- August 12, 1901, for the Detroit Tigers

MLB statistics
- Batting average: .284
- Home runs: 0
- Runs batted in: 14
- Stats at Baseball Reference

Teams
- Detroit Tigers (1901)

Daniel Solomon "Davey" Crockett (October 5, 1875 – February 23, 1961) was an American baseball player and manager. He played professional baseball as a first baseman for 19 years from 1894 to 1912, including 28 games in Major League Baseball for the Detroit Tigers during team's inaugural season in the major leagues. He also served as the manager of the Staunton/Harrisonurg Lunatics of the Virginia Mountain League in 1914.

== Early years ==
Crockett was born in Roanoke, Virginia, in 1875.

== Professional baseball ==
Crockett played for the 1901 Detroit Tigers. In 28 games, he collected 29 hits in 104 at bats for a .284 batting average. He also had 14 RBIs, 10 runs scored, two doubles, two triples, and a .336 on-base percentage.

In addition to his one season in Major League Baseball, Crockett played in the minor leagues from 1894 to 1912, including stints with the Roanoke Magicians of the Virginia League (1894–1895), the Davenport River Rats (1902–1906) and Clinton Infants (1907), both in the Three-Eye League, Goldsboro Giants of the Eastern Carolina League (1909–1910), and Cleveland Counts of the Appalachian League (1911–1912). He also served as the manager of the Staunton/Harrisonburg Lunatics of the Virginia Mountain League in 1914.

== Later years ==
After retiring from baseball, Crockett returned to Virginia. He died in 1961 at age 85 in Charlottesville, Virginia, and is interred at Evergreen Burial Park.
