= Wilmington Sailors =

- 1908–1910; Wilmington, North Carolina

Minor league affiliations
- Class: Class D (1908–1910)
- League: Eastern Carolina League (1908–1910)

Major league affiliations
- Team: None

Minor league titles
- League titles (0): None
- Conference titles (1): 1908

Team data
- Name: Wilmington Sailors (1908–1910)
- Ballpark: Hilton Park (1908–1910)

The Wilmington Sailors were a minor league baseball team based in Wilmington, North Carolina. From 1908 to 1910, the Sailors played exclusively as members of the Class D level Eastern Carolina League, winning the 1908 pennant. Wilmington hosted minor league home games at Hilton Park.

== History ==
The Wilmington Sailors were preceded in minor league play by the 1901 Wilmington Giants, who played the season as members of the Virginia-North Carolina League.

In 1908, the Wilmington "Sailors" resumed minor league play, as the team became members of the six–team, Class D level Eastern Carolina League. The Goldsboro Giants, Kinston, New Bern, Raleigh Red Birds and Wilson Tobacconists teams joined Wilmington in beginning league play on June 8, 1908.

The Wilmington's "Sailors" nickname corresponds with local geography and industry, as the city is located on the Atlantic Ocean, hosting an historic port, shipbuilding and recreational boating. The city has long been a port and a strategic naval site, serving home to the Port of Wilmington.

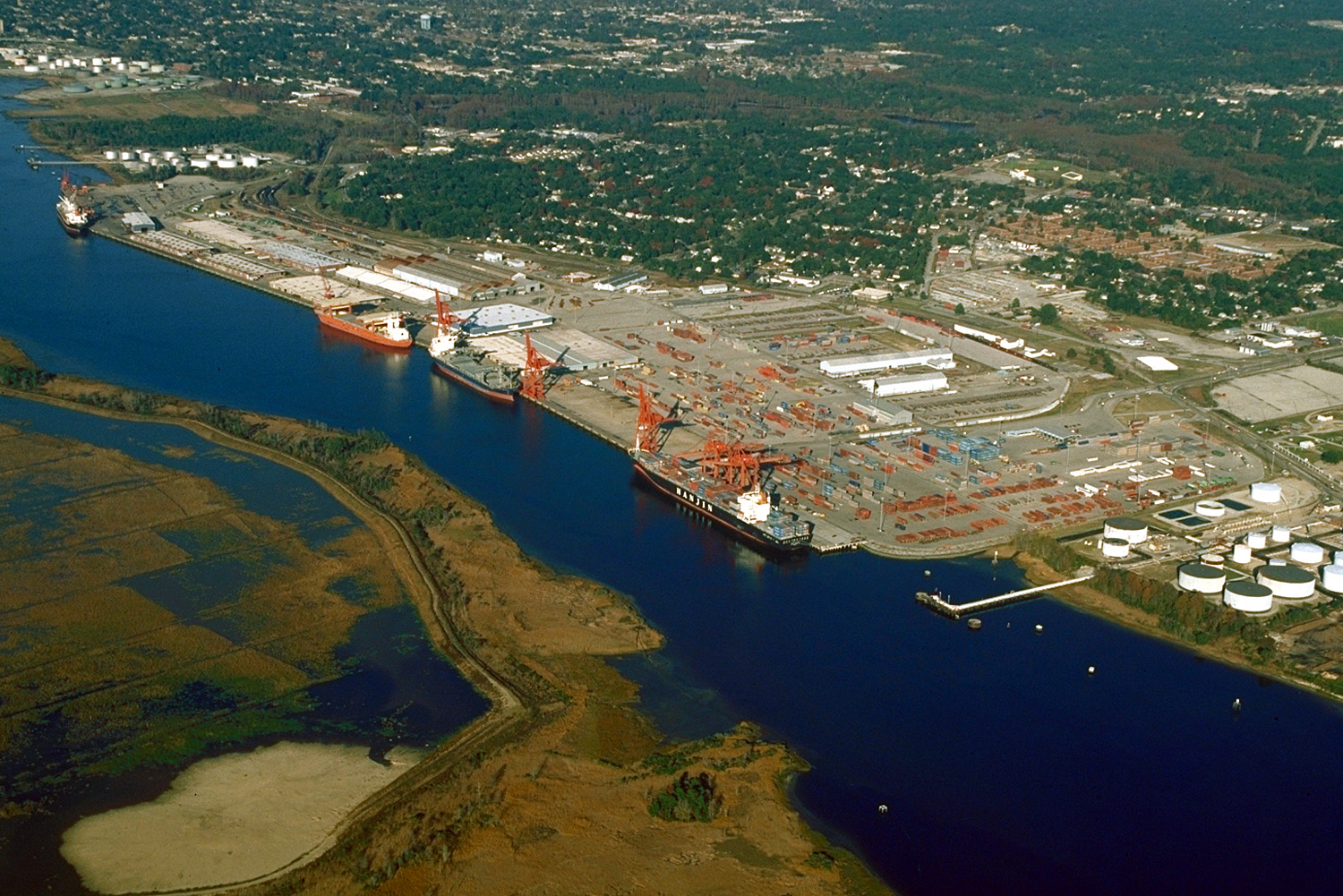
(1987) Port of Wilmington. Wilmington North Carolina.

Beginning Eastern Caroling League play in 1908, the Wilmington Sailors qualified for the Finals. The Sailors ended the Eastern Carolina League regular season with an overall record of 35-21, placing second in the final standings and finishing 2.0 games behind Wilson, with Wally Smith serving the Sailors' manager. The league played a split-season schedule and Wilmington won second half pennant. Meeting the Wilson Tobacconists, winners of the first half pennant in the finals, Wilmington lost. Wilson defeated the Sailors two games to one. Pitcher Harvey Bussey of Wilmington led the Eastern Carolina League with 14 wins.

Continuing Eastern Caroling League play in their second season of play, the Sailors again finished in second place under returning manager Dick Smith. Wilmington finished the 1909 season with a record of 50–40 to finish just 0.5 game behind the Wilson Tobacconists (50–39) in the final standings of the six–team league.

In their final season of play, the Sailors placed third in the 1910 Eastern Carolina League overall standings. Wilmington ended the season with a record of 42-43 and did not qualify for the playoff in the split-season format. Wilmington was managed by Bert Kila and finished 5.5 games behind the first place Fayetteville Highlanders in the overall standings. Fayetteville won the playoff over the Rocky Mount Railroaders.

Wilmington next hosted minor league baseball in 1928, when the Eastern Carolina league reformed, with the pennant winning Wilmington Pirates as a member.

== The ballpark ==
The Wilmington Sailors hosted home minor league home games at Hilton Park. The ballpark was located on Hilton Street, near Cornelius Harnett Drive. Today, an oak tree in Hilton Park, believed to be over 300 years old is decorated every year as a Christmas tree.

== Timeline ==
| Year(s) | # Yrs. | Team | Level | League | Ballpark |
|---|---|---|---|---|---|
| 1908–1910 | 3 | Wilmington Sailors | Class D | Eastern Carolina League | Hilton Park |

== Year–by–year records ==
| Year | Record | Finish | Manager | Playoffs/Notes |
|---|---|---|---|---|
| 1908 | 35–21 | 2nd | Dick Smith | Won 2nd half pennant Lost in Finals |
| 1909 | 50–40 | 2nd | Dick Smith | No playoffs held |
| 1910 | 42–43 | 3rd | Bert Kite | Did not qualify |

== Notable alumni ==
- Morrie Rath (1908)
- Wilmington Sailors players
