= Rocky Mount Railroaders =

- 1909–1910; Rocky Mount, North Carolina

Minor league affiliations
- Class: Class D (1909–1910)
- League: Eastern Carolina League (1909–1910)

Major league affiliations
- Team: None

Minor league titles
- League titles (0): None
- Conference titles (1): 1910

Team data
- Name: Rocky Mount Railroaders (1909–1910)
- Ballpark: League Park (1909–1910)

The Rocky Mount Railroaders were a minor league baseball team based in Rocky Mount, North Carolina. In 1909 and 1910, the "Railroaders" played exclusively as members of the Class D level Eastern Carolina League, winning a 1910 split-season pennant in the six-team league.

The Railroaders hosted minor league home games at League Park. Today, the ballpark site is known as Kite Park.

Olympian and Pro Football Hall of Fame member Jim Thorpe played baseball for the Railroaders in both 1909 and 1910. Thorpe was forced to return his Gold Medals won in the 1912 Olympic Games when his professional baseball play with Rocky Mount was discovered by the International Olympic Committee. This ruling was overturned in by the IOC 1982 and his gold medals were returned to his family. Today, a historical marker is placed in Rocky Mount honoring his minor league baseball play in the city.

== History ==
=== Railroaders beginnings ===
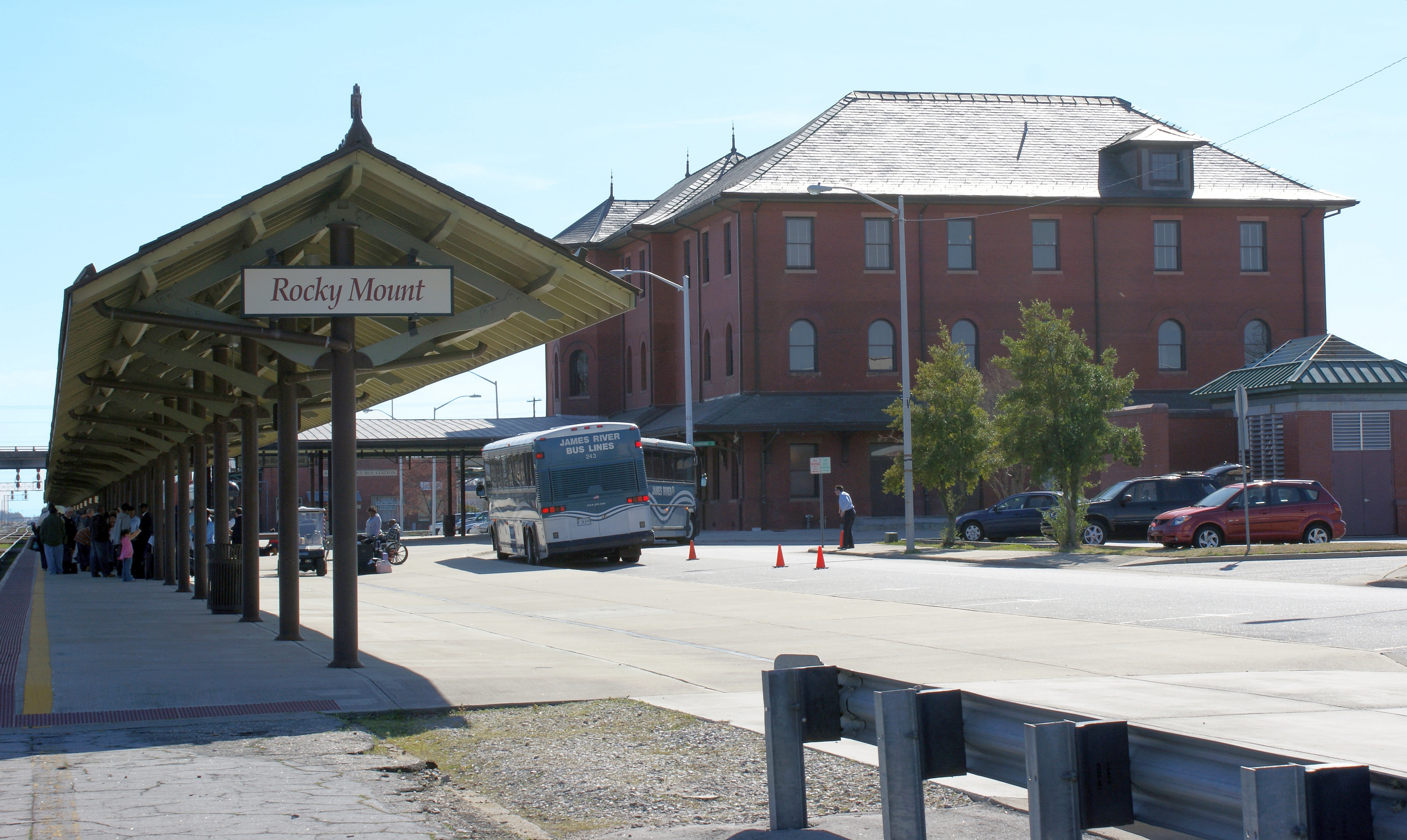
(2009) Rocky Mount Train Station. Constructed in 1893, the station is listed on the National Register of Historic Places as a contributing property to the Rocky Mount Central City Historic District.

Rocky Mount first hosted minor league baseball in 1909, when the Rocky Mount "Railroaders" were formed and began minor league play as members of the six–team, Class D level Eastern Carolina League, in the second season of play for the league. Rocky Mount and the newly formed Fayetteville Highlanders franchise joined the returning Goldsboro Giants, Raleigh Red Birds, Wilmington Sailors and Wilson Tobacconists teams in beginning league play on June 3, 1909. The Eastern Carolina League was first formed in 1908 as a six-team league. The new Rocky Mount and Fayetteville teams replaced the folded Kinston and New Bern franchises in the league.

The Rocky Mount "Railroaders" nickname corresponds to local history and industry in the region in the era. The Norfolk—Rocky Mount Line was constructed in 1893 at the junction with the Atlantic Coast Line Railroad's main line in Rocky Mount. Rocky Mount became the northern headquarters of the Atlantic Coast Line Railroad, which established major repair shops and yard facilities in the city, employing many railroad workers at their facilities. In 1900, Rocky Mount's population was around 3,000 and on February 28, 1907, with a population around 7,500 when the city was officially incorporated. Today the city's railroad history is still present, Rocky Mount is home to the Rocky Mount Railroad Museum.

=== Jim Thorpe ===
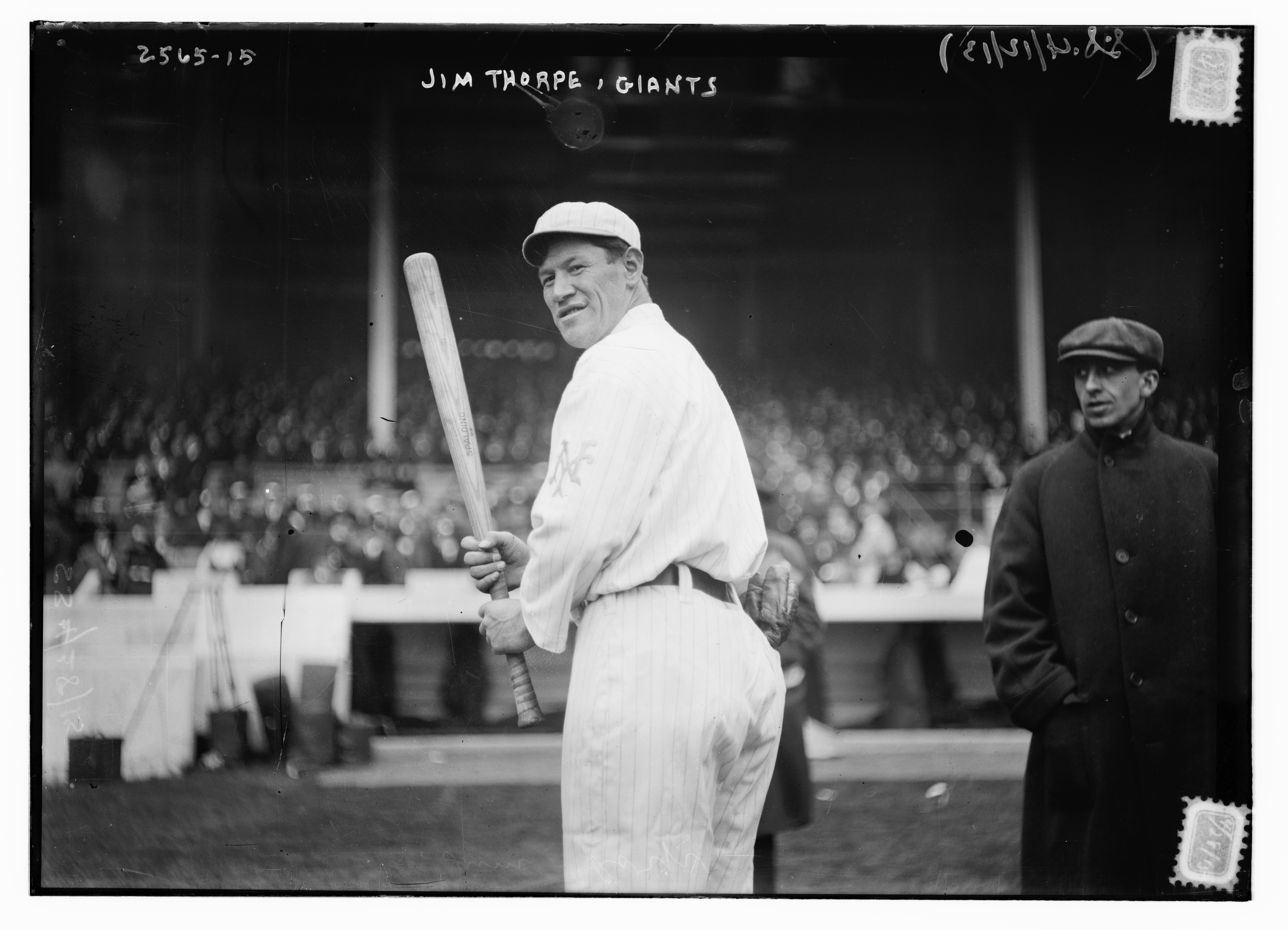
(1913) Jim Thorpe, New York Giants. Thorpe played for the Railroaders in 1909 and 1910, his first professional baseball seasons. Thorpe won two gold medals for the United States in the 1912 Olympic Games and was later inducted into the Pro Football Hall of Fame.

At age 22, Jim Thorpe played for Rocky Mount in his first professional baseball seasons before going on to forge a professional football career and make the 1912 United States Olympic. Later, because of his participation in professional baseball in Rocky Mount and the amateur rules in the era, Thorpe was forced to relinquish the gold medals he won representing the United States of America in the 1912 Olympic Games. Thorpe won both the pentathlon and the newly created decathlon competitions in the Olympic games.

In 1913, Thorpe's gold medals were stripped by the International Olympic Committee, after the IOC learned that Thorpe had taken expense money for playing baseball, violating contemporary Olympic amateurism rules. Almost 70 years later, in 1982, the IOC reversed course and ruled that Thorpe's disqualification had been improper, as no protest against Thorpe's eligibility had been brought within the required 30 days. The IOC then reinstated Thorpe's gold medals. The medals were presented to his children in 1983, an event that occurred 30 years after Thorpe's death. Lastly, in 2022, the IOC declared Thorpe as the sole winner of the pentathlon and decathlon events after extensive consultations with his former competitors' families who said they had always viewed Thorpe as the winner. After the original ruling against Thorpe, Norway’s Ferdinand Bie, the pentathlon original second-place finisher, was awarded the gold medal. But Bie refused to accept the gold medal and never changed his mind.

After beginning his professional baseball career at age 22 with Rocky Mount in 1909, Thorpe played 29 games with Rocky Mount in 1910 hitting .237, before moving to the Fayetteville Highlanders where he played 16 games. Coincidently, the two teams met in the 1910 finals, won by Fayetteville. It was said that Thorpe had difficulty hitting the curve ball in baseball.

While playing for Rocky Mount, Thorpe lived in a rented room at the Cooper Home, which was located on Western Avenue and no longer exists. He paid $5 per month for rent.

Thorpe later made his professional baseball debut with the New York Giants in 1913 and he played six major league seasons. Thorpe began playing professional football in 1915. When the National Football League was formed in 1920, Thorpe was named as the first president of the league, while continuing as an NFL player through 1928. Thorpe was elected into the Por Football Hall of Fame in 1963. In 1950, Thorpe was selected by The Associated Press as the greatest athlete of the half-century, receiving 252 of the 393 first-place votes from sportswriters and broadcasters. Second place was Babe Ruth with 86 first-place votes.

Today there is a historical marker placed at Church Street and Falls Road in Rocky Mount that honors Jim Thorpe's baseball play with the Railroaders.

=== 1909 and 1910 Eastern Carolina League play ===
In the era, the Railroaders players ate pre-game meals at the Cambridge Hotel in Rocky Mount before heading to the ballpark for home games. The team dressed at the hotel and then walked to the ballpark. Youngsters who helped carry their equipment were given free admission to the game.

The Railroaders were owned by William Eaton Fenner, who was a local businessman in the tobacco industry. Five starting players for the 1909 Rocky Mount team were from Pennsylvania, three from Villanova University and two from the Carlisle Indian Industrial School. The Villanova trio were the Rocky Mount catcher/manager Joe Walsh, second baseman John Murray, and center fielder Martin O’Gara. Left fielder Joseph Libby and pitcher/player Jim Thorpe were both 22-year-olds signed from the Carlisle Indian Industrial School.

Beginning Eastern Caroling League play in their first season of play, the Railroaders finished in last place, playing the season under managers W. B. Fenner and Joe Walsh. The Rocky Mount Railroaders ended the 1909 season with a record of 27–61 to finish 22.5 games behind the first place Wilson Tobacconists (50–39) in the final standings of the six–team league.

While pitching for Rocky Mount on July 14, 1909, Jim Thorpe pitched a complete game in the Railroaders' 3–1 victory over the Wilmington Sailors. The game was played in 90-degree heat. Catcher/manager Joe Walsh suffered from heat exhaustion during the game at League Park in Rocky Mount and had to be given time to recover. A Wilmington player fainted in the heat while playing the outfield during the game. Thorpe played in 44 games for Rocky Mount and batted .254 in 1909. As a pitcher, his record was 9-10 for the last place team. Thorpe's baseball salary was $60 per month.

During the 1909 season, there were controversies between the Rocky Mount and Wilson teams. First, accusations were levied by the Wilson franchise that Rocky Mount had used ineligible players during the season. In a game against Wilson on August 10, 1909, Rocky Mount manager Joe Walsh took his team off the field and forfeited the game after accusing the Wilson pitcher of doctoring the baseballs and being unsuccessful in convincing the umpire to take action. This decision created negative press against Rocky Mount in the Wilson newspaper. Soon after the August 10 incident, the Wilson newspaper accused the Rocky Mount team of conspiring to deny the Wilson team the pennant, making the accusation that the Railroaders were losing to Wilson’s rivals on purpose, only to play hard in games against Wilson. Sworn affidavits were compiled, and a league meeting was called. No action was taken by the league.

In their final season of play, the 1910 Rocky Mount Railroaders rebounded from their last place finish the season before and qualified for the Eastern Carolina League finals. Rocky Mount placed fourth in the 1910 Eastern Carolina League overall standings. The Railroaders ended the season with a record of 43-45 and qualified for the playoff in the split-season format by winning the second half pennant. Rocky Mount was managed by Marty Phelan and James Connors and finished 6.0 games behind the first place Fayetteville Highlanders in the overall standings. Fayetteville won the first half pennant in the split season schedule. Meeting in the finals, Fayetteville won the playoff series against the Rocky Mount Railroaders 4 games to 1.

In the final game of their playoff series, Rocky Mount was at bat and trailing Fayetteville 2-1 in the 9th inning. Fayetteville turned a triple play to end the game and the season.

After the 1910 baseball season, Jim Thorpe returned to the Carlisle Indian Industrial School for the 1911 football season.

The Eastern Carolina League did not return to play in 1911. The league later reformed in 1928, with the Rocky Mount Buccaneers team as a member.

After the Eastern Carolina League folded following the 1910 season, Rocky Mount next hosted minor league baseball in 1915, when the Rocky Mount Carolinians began a tenue of play as members of the Class C level Virginia League, winning the league pennant in their first season. Beginning in 1915, the Rocky Mount minor league teams began playing home games at Municipal Stadium in Rocky Mount, which hosted minor league teams through 1980. The stadium is still in use today.

== The ballpark ==
The Rocky Mount Railroaders teams of 1909 and 1910 hosted home minor league home games at League Park in Rocky Mount. In the era, the ballpark was located at Edgecombe Street at Branch Street and Marigold Street in Rocky Mount. Today, the site hosts Kite Park. A water tower was constructed at Kite Park in 1934. Kite Park is located at 431 Marigold Street in Rocky Mount, North Carolina.

== Timeline ==
Year(s)	# Yrs.	Team	Level	League	Ballpark
1909–1910	2	Rocky Mount Railroaders	Class D	Eastern Carolina League	League Park

== Year–by–year records ==
Year	Record	Finish	Manager	Playoffs/Notes
1909	27–61	6th	W. B. Fenner / Joe Walsh	Did not qualify
1910	43–45	4th	Marty Phelan / James Connors	Won 2nd half pennant Lost in Finals

== Notable alumni ==
- Jim Thorpe (1909–1910) Inducted Pro Football Hall of Fame, 1963
- Rocky Mount Railroaders players
