= Eastern Carolina League =

- Classification: Class D (1908–1910, 1928–1929)
- Sport: Minor League Baseball
- First season: 1908
- Folded: 1929
- President: J. W. Washington (1908); Dr. Joel D. Whitaker (1909–1910); William G. Bramham (1928–1929)
- No. of teams: 19
- Country: United States of America
- Most titles: 2 Wilson Tobacconists
- Related competitions: Blue Ridge League; Carolina Association

The Eastern Carolina League was a Minor League Baseball affiliation which operated in the eastern part of North Carolina in the early part of the 20th century. The league had two distinct periods of operation: 1908 to 1910, and a revival of the league in 1928 and 1929. It was classified as a Class D league.

A notable player in the league was Jim Thorpe—it was his involvement with the Eastern Carolina League that cost him his amateur status and his 1912 Summer Olympics metals.

== Eastern Carolina League champions ==
- 1908 – Wilson Tobacconists †
- 1909 – Wilson Tobacconists
- 1910 – Fayetteville Highlanders
- 1928 – Goldsboro Manufacturers
- 1929 – Rocky Mount Buccaneers

† In late August 1908, Eastern North Carolina was hit by what is now known as Tropical Storm #5. The playoffs were abandoned with Wilmington leading Wilson 2 games to 1.

== Cities represented ==
- Fayetteville, NC: Fayetteville Highlanders 1909–1910
- Goldsboro, NC: Goldsboro Giants 1908–1910; Goldsboro Manufacturers 1928; Goldsboro Goldbugs 1929
- Greenville, NC: Greenville Tobacconists 1928–1929
- Kinston, NC: Kinston 1908; Kinston Eagles 1928–1929
- New Bern, NC: New Bern 1908
- Raleigh, NC: Raleigh Red Birds 1908–1910
- Rocky Mount, NC: Rocky Mount Railroaders 1909–1910; Rocky Mount Buccaneers 1928–1929
- Wilmington, NC: Wilmington Sailors 1908–1910; Wilmington Pirates 1928–1929
- Wilson, NC: Wilson Tobacconists 1908–1910

== Standings & statistics ==
=== 1908 to 1910 ===
1908 Eastern Carolina League 1908 schedule
Team name	W	L	PCT	GB	Managers
Wilson Tobacconists	36	18	.667	–	Earl Holt
Wilmington Sailors	35	21	.625	2	Dick Smith
Goldsboro Giants	29	28	.509	8½	H.E. Kling
Raleigh Red Birds	23	36	.390	15½	George "King" Kelly / Frank Thompson; Wallace Warren
New Bern	5	16	.238	NA	NA
Kinston	6	12	.333	NA	Lloyd Wooten

New Bern and Kinston withdrew July 15
Playoffs: Abandoned August 27 due to bad weather. Wilmington was leading Wilson 2 games to 1.

Player statistics
Player	Team	Stat	Tot	Player	Team	Stat	Tot
Earl Holt	Wilson	BA	.286	Harvey Bussey	Wilmington	W	14
Walker Moore	Wilson	Runs	28	Fred Anderson	Wilson	SO	120
Walker Moore	Wilson	Hits	57	Hatton Ogle	Wilson	Pct	.846; 11–2
L. Fox	Kinston/Raleigh	HR	3				

1909 Eastern Carolina League 1909 schedule
Team name	W	L	PCT	GB	Managers
Wilson Tobacconists	50	39	.562	–	Earl Holt
Wilmington Sailors	50	40	.556	½	Dick Smith
Fayetteville Highlanders	49	41	.544	1½	Charles Moss / Charles Clancy
Raleigh Red Birds	49	41	.544	1½	Richard Crozier
Goldsboro Giants	43	46	.486	7	H. E. Kling
Rocky Mount Railroaders	27	61	.307	22½	W. B. Fenner / Joe Walsh

Playoffs: Wilson awarded championship after ineligible player violations were enacted.

Player statistics
Player	Team	Stat	Tot	Player	Team	Stat	Tot
Bill Schumaker	Fayetteville	BA	.340	Harry Otis	Goldsboro	W	19
Pete Clemens	Fayetteville	Runs	46	Bill Luyster	Fayetteville	Pct	.786; 11–3
Charlie Armstrong	Wilson	Hits	76				

1910 Eastern Carolina League 1910 schedule
Team name	W	L	PCT	GB	Managers
Fayetteville Highlanders	47	37	.560	–	Charles Clancy
Wilson Tobacconists	44	39	.530	2½	Charles McGeehan
Wilmington Sailors	42	43	.494	5½	Bert Kite / L.T. Mills
Rocky Mount Railroaders	43	45	.489	6	M.J. Phelan / James Connors
Goldsboro Giants	39	44	.470	7½	William "King" Kelley
Raleigh Red Birds	38	45	.458	8½	Richard Crozier

Playoffs: Fayetteville 4 games, Rocky Mount 1.

Player statistics
Player	Team	Stat	Tot	Player	Team	Stat	Tot
Curly Brown	Goldsboro	BA	.294	Bunny Hearn	Wilson	W	16
J. T. Mullins	Fayetteville	Runs	40	Erskine Mayer	Fayetteville	Pct	.882; 15–2
Pete Clemens	Raleigh	Hits	74				

=== 1928 to 1929 ===
1928 Eastern Carolina League
Team name	W	L	PCT	GB	Managers
Wilmington Pirates	68	46	.596	–	Hal Weafer
Goldsboro Manufacturers	66	48	.579	2	Jim Teague
Rocky Mount Buccaneers	55	56	.495	11½	Charles McMillan
Kinston Eagles	55	59	.482	13	Paul Bennett / Marty Walters
Fayetteville Highlanders	53	60	.469	14½	Lee Gooch / Pooly Hubert
Greenville Tobacconists	43	71	.377	25	Taylor Jolliff / Tom Abbott

Playoffs: Goldsboro 4 games, Wilmington 2

Player statistics
Player	Team	Stat	Tot	Player	Team	Stat	Tot
Frank Roscoe	Wilmington	BA	.387	Ralph Carver	Goldsboro	W	17
Charles Hamel	Goldsboro	Runs	101	Bobo Newsom	Greenville/Wilmington	SO	114
Frank Roscoe	Wilmington	Hits	154	Eddie Alsobrook	Fayetteville/Rocky Mt.	ERA	2.70
Frank Roscoe	Wilmington	RBI	101	Ralph Carver	Goldsboro	PCT	.944; 17–1
Frank Roscoe	Wilmington	HR	36				

1929 Eastern Carolina League
Team name	W	L	PCT	GB	Managers
Rocky Mount Buccaneers	69	47	.595	–	Zip King / Charles Moore
Goldsboro Goldbugs	68	50	.576	2	Jim Teague / Spoke Emery
Wilmington Pirates	67	52	.563	3½	Hal Weafer
Fayetteville Highlanders	55	62	.470	14½	Cy Chisholm / Marty Walters
Greenville Tobacconists	45	68	.398	22½	Lester Bangs / Guy Smith; Dan Pasquella
Kinston Eagles	46	71	.393	23½	Clarence Roper

Playoffs: Rocky Mount 4 games, Wilmington 2

Player statistics
Player	Team	Stat	Tot	Player	Team	Stat	Tot
Clarence Roper	Kinston	BA	.368	Edward Heller	Goldsboro	W	17
Sam Fayonsky	Rocky Mount	Runs	94	Eddie Alsobrook	Rocky Mount	W	17
Roland Robins	Wilmington	Hits	154	Edward Heller	Goldsboro	ERA	2.37
Tom Young	Fayette/Wilmington	RBI	89	Henry Thormahlen	Wilmington	SO	135
Tom Young	Fayette/Wilmington	HR	21	Henry Thormahlen	Wilmington	PCT	.875; 14–2
