= Kinston Eagles (Eastern Carolina League) =

Kington Eagles
- 1928–1929; Kinston, North Carolina

Minor league affiliations
- Class: Class D (1928–1929)
- League: Eastern Carolina League (1928–1929)

Major league affiliations
- Team: None

Minor league titles
- League titles (0): None
- Wild card berths (0): None

Team data
- Name: Kinston Eagles (1928–1929)
- Ballpark: Grainger Park (1928–1929)

The Kinston Eagles were a minor league baseball team based in Kinston, North Carolina.

In 1928 and 1929, the Eagles played as members of the six–team, Class D level Eastern Carolina League. The 1927 Kinston Eagles of the Class B level Virginia League immediately preceded the 1928 team. The 1934 Kinston Eagles resumed play as members of the Class D level Coastal Plain League.

The Kingston Eagles teams hosted home minor league games at Grainger Park.

== History ==
After first hosting minor league baseball in 1908, the Kinston Eagles of the Eastern Carolina League were preceded by the 1927 Kinston Eagles of the Class B level Virginia League. The franchise then joined the Eastern Carolina League in 1928. Kinston was briefly a member of the 1908 Eastern Carolina League before folding on July 15, during the 1908 season. The Eastern Carolina League continued play until folding after the 1910 season.

Continuing minor league baseball play, the 1928 Kinston Eagles again became members of the reformed, six–team Class D level Eastern Carolina League. The Fayetteville Highlanders, Goldsboro Manufacturers, Greenville Tobacconists, Rocky Mount Buccaneers and Wilmington Pirates teams joined Kinston in beginning league play on April 25, 1928.

In their first season of play in the new league, the Kingston Eagles the regular season in fourth place. The Eagles ended the season with a record of 55–59, playing in the six–team Eastern Carolina League. The Kinston managers in 1937 were Paul Bennett and Marty Walters, as the Eagles finished 13.0 games behind the first place Wilmington Pirates in the final standings. The Eagles did not qualify for the playoff, won by the Goldsboro Manufacturers over Wilmington.

In their final season of play, the 1929 Kinston Eagles finished in last place in the six–team Eastern Carolina League standings. Playing the season under manager Clarence Roper, the Eagles ended the season with a record of 46–71 to placing sixth and finish 23.5 games behind the first place Rocky Mount Buccaneers. Kinston did not qualify for the playoff won by Rocky Mount over Wilmington. Player/manager Clarence Roper won the league batting title, leading the Eastern Carolina League with a .368 batting average.

The Eastern Carolina League permanently folded following the 1929 season. Kinston next hosted minor league baseball when the 1937 Kinston Eagles resumed play as members of the Class D level Coastal Plain League.

Through 2023, Kinston hosted the Down East Wood Ducks of the Class A level Carolina League, who were a minor league affiliate of the Texas Rangers. Kinston began Carolina League play in 1956.

== The ballpark ==
In 1928, the Kinston Eagles began hosting home minor league games at Grainger Park. The ballpark was adjacent to Grainger High School and was torn down following the 1949 season. Grainger Park was located on Summit Avenue. Grainger Stadium opened in 1949 as the replacement for Grainger Park. The ballpark is still in use today.

== Timeline ==
Year(s)	# Yrs.	Team	Level	League	Ballpark
1928–1929	2	Kinston Eagles	Class D	Eastern Carolina League	Grainger Park

== Year–by–year records ==
Year	Record	Finish	Manager	Playoffs/Notes
1928	55–59	4th	Paul Bennett / Marty Walters	Did not qualify
1929	46–71	6th	Clarence Roper	Did not qualify

== Notable alumni ==
No players on the 1928 or 1929 Kinston Eagles advanced to the major leagues.

== See also ==
Kinston Eagles players
