= Greenville Greenies =

- 1928–1951; (1928–1929, 1934–1941, 1946–1951); Greenville, North Carolina

Minor league affiliations
- Class: Class D (1928–1929, 1937–1941, 1946–1951)
- League: Eastern Carolina League (1928–1929); Coastal Plain League (1934–1941, 1946–1951)

Major league affiliations
- Team: Washington Senators (1939)

Minor league titles
- League titles (1): 1949
- Conference titles (1): 1939

Team data
- Name: Greenville Tobacconists (1928–1929); Greenville Greenies (1934–1941, 1946–1949); Greenville Robins (1950–1951)
- Ballpark: Elm Street Park (1934–1937); Third Street Park (1938–1940); Guy Smith Stadium (1941, 1946–1951)

The Greenville Greenies were a minor league baseball team based in Greenville, North Carolina. The Greenies played as members of the Coastal Plain League from 1934 to 1941, having been preceded by the Greenville Tobacconists, who played as members of the Eastern Carolina League in 1928 and 1929. Following World War II, the Greenies resumed play in the Class D Coastal Plain League from 1946 to 1949 before being renamed the Greenville Robins for the 1950 and 1951 seasons.

The 1939 Greenville Greenies were a minor league affiliate of the Washington Senators.

The Greenville minor league teams hosted games at three ballparks, playing at Elm Street Park (1934–1937), Third Street Park (1938–1940) and Guy Smith Stadium (1941, 1946–1951). Elm Street Park and Guy Smith Stadium are still in use today.

== History ==
=== 1928 to 1929 Eastern Carolina League ===
The first minor league baseball team in Greenville, North Carolina was the 1928 Greenville Tobacconists. The Tobacconists played as members of the Class D level Eastern Carolina League.

In their first season of play, the Greenville Tobacconists finished last in the 1928 six–team Eastern Carolina League, which had reformed. Greenville finished 43–71, playing the season under Managers James Jolliff and Tom Abbott. Greenville [laced sixth in the league standings, behind the Fayetteville Highlanders (53–60), Goldsboro Manufacturers (66–48), Kinston Eagles (55–59), Rocky Mount Buccaneers (55–56) and Wilmington Pirates (68–46).

Continuing play in the 1929 Eastern Carolina League, Greenville had three different managers and finished in fifth place. The Tobacconists had a record of 45–68 under Lester Bangs, Guy Smith and Dan Pasquella. The Eastern Carolina League permanently folded after the 1929 season.

=== 1934 to 1941 Coastal Plain League ===
In 1934, Greenville resumed minor league play, as the Greenville Greenies began play as charter members of the Independent six–team Coastal Plain League.

The Coastal Plain League became classified as a Class D League for the 1937 season. The Greenville Greenies ended the season with a record of 40–58, finishing in seventh place in the eight–team Coastal Plain League. Their manager in 1937 was Bo Farley.

Under managers Alfred Joyner and Halley Wilson, the Greenville Greenies finished the 1938 season with a record of 45–68, placing seventh in the Coastal Plain League. The team began play at Third Street Park.

In 1939, the Greenville Greenies won the 1939 Coastal Plain League pennant as the Greenville franchise became a Washington Senators minor league affiliate. With a Record of 75–47, Greenville placed first in the Coastal Plain League regular season, playing under manager Halley Wilson, In the 1939 playoffs, the Kinston Eagles defeated the Greenville Greenies 4 games to 2.

The 1940 Greenville Greenies finished with a record of 53–71, to place seventh in the Coastal Plain League standings under returning manager Halley Wilson. The 1940 season was their last at Third Street Park.

The Greenville Greenies advanced to the 1941 Coastal Plain League Finals. Playing at Guy Smith Stadium, the Greenies had a record of 64–54, placing second in the regular season under returning player/manager Halley Wilson. In the 1941 Coastal Plain League playoffs, the Greenville Greenies defeated the New Bern Bears 4 games to 2 and advanced. In the Finals, the Wilson Tobs defeated Greenville 4 games to 2.

=== 1946 to 1951 Coastal Plain League ===
The 1946 Greenville Greenies returned to play after the Coastal Plain League was idle in the 1942–1945 seasons due to World War II. The Greenies ended the season with a 58–67 record in the regular season, placing sixth in the eight–team league. The 1946 manager was Virgil Payne. Returning to play at Guy Smith Stadium, season attendance was 62,354, an average of 998 per game.

Greenville finished in last place in the 1947 Coastal Plain League regular season standings. The Greenies' regular season record of 58–82 placed the team eighth in the Coastal Plain League final standings. The 1947 Greenville Greenies were managed by John Pare, Larry Baldwin and Ordie Timm. Continuing play at Guy Smith Stadium, Greenville drew 66,316 fans for the season.

The 1948 Greenville Greenies again finished in last place in the Coastal Plain League standings. The Greenville Greenies finished 50–89 and placed eighth in the Coastal Plain League final standings. The team again had three managers: Bill Phebus, Izzy Cohen and Kelly Kee. Their home attendance at Guy Smith Stadium was 60,938, an average of 877 per game.

The 1949 Greenville Greenies won the Coastal Plain League Championship. The Greenies finished the regular season with a 71–67 record, placing fourth in the Coastal Plain League under player/manager Fred Williams, qualifying for the playoffs. In the first round of the 1949 Coastal Plain League playoffs, Greenville defeated the Rocky Mount Leafs 4 games to 2 and advanced. In the 1949 Finals, the Greenville Greenies beat the Kinston Eagles 4 games 2 to win the 1949 championship. Season attendance was 72,420, a per-game average of 1,050.

Greenville remained in the 1950 Coastal Plain League, playing with the new Greenville Robins moniker. With a Coastal Plain League regular season record of 67–70, the Robins placed sixth in the Coastal Plain League final standings, missing the playoffs. The Robins' manager was Randy Heflin. Season attendance was 49,140.

The 1951 Greenville Robins folded from the Coastal Plain League mid-season. The Greenville Robins and Tarboro A's both folded from the league on June 6, 1951. The Robins had a 10–24 record under manager John Streza when the franchise folded. Playing their last season at Guy Smith Stadium, Greensville had overall attendance of 5,932, an average of 349 per game, during the partial season.

In 2024 the Greenville became the home of the amateur Greenville Yard Gnomes of the collegiate summer baseball Coastal Plain League, playing their home games at Guy Smith Stadium.

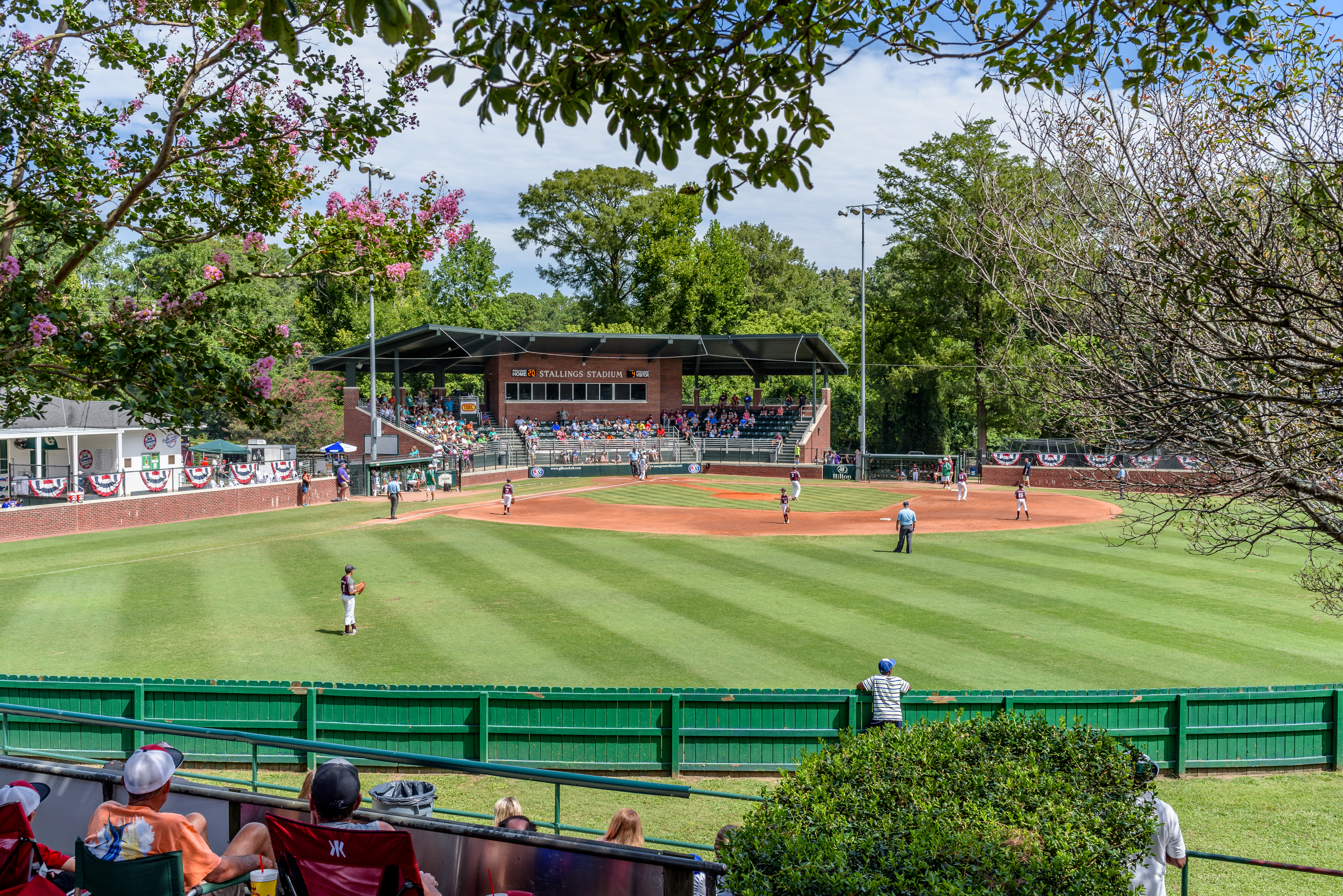
(2017) Elm Street Park. Greenville, North Carolina.

== The ballparks ==
Early Greenville minor league teams played home minor league games at Elm Street Park through 1937. Also called High School Park, the ballpark had a capacity of 1,200. Elm Street Park is still in use today and has a lighted youth baseball field and other youth baseball fields. Elm Street Park is located at 1058 South Elm Street, Greenville, North Carolina.

From 1938 to 1940, the Greenville Greenies minor league teams played home games at Third Street Park. The ballpark had a capacity of 1,500 in 1938 and 3,000 in 1940. The field dimensions were (Left, Center, Right): 320–390–320.

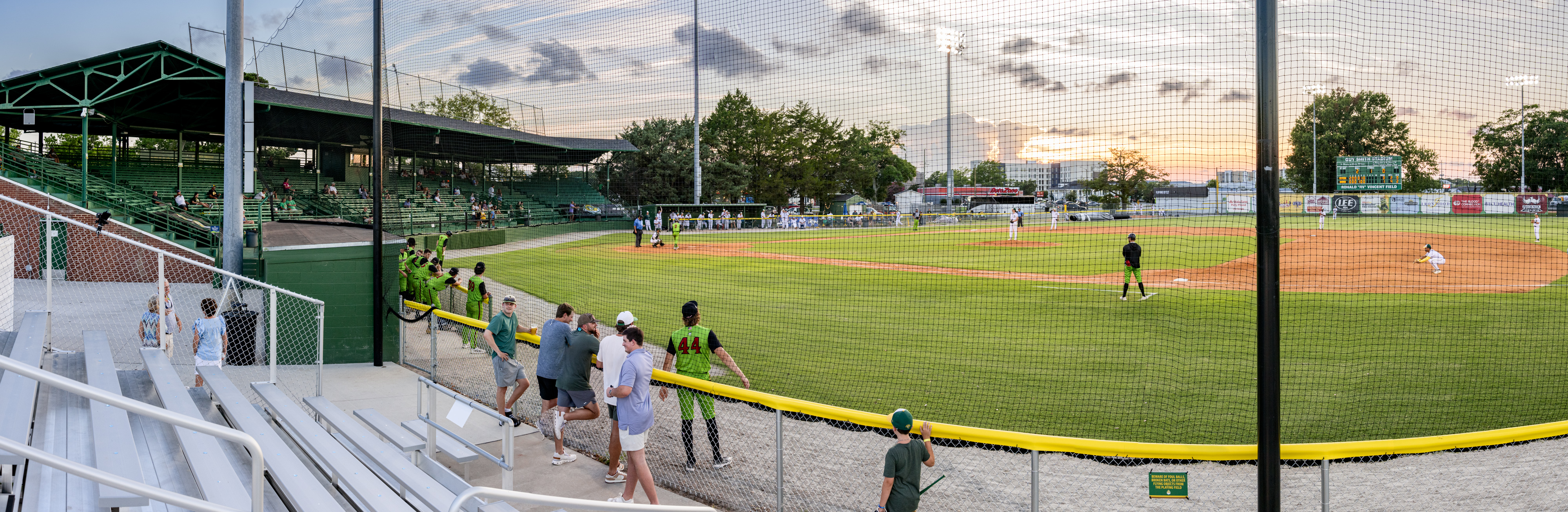
(2024) Greeneville Yard Gnomes game. Guy Smith Stadium.

Beginning in 1941, Greenville minor league teams hosted home games at Guy Smith Stadium. The ballpark was built in 1939 for $50,000 as a Works Project Administration Project. Guy Smith Stadium is located within Guy Smith Park and is still in use as a baseball stadium. The location is 1051 Moye Boulevard in Greenville, North Carolina.

== Timeline ==
Year(s)	# Yrs.	Team	Level	League	Affiliate	Ballpark
1928–1929	2	Greenville Tobacconists	Class D	Eastern Carolina League	None	Elm Street Park
1934–1937	2	Greenville Greenies	Class D	Coastal Plain League	None	Elm Street Park
1938	1	Greenville Greenies	Class D	Coastal Plain League	None	Third Street Park
1939	1	Greenville Greenies	Class D	Coastal Plain League	Washington Senators	Third Street Park
1940	1	Greenville Greenies	Class D	Coastal Plain League	None	Third Street Park
1941	1	Greenville Greenies	Class D	Coastal Plain League	None	Guy Smith Stadium
1946–1949	4	Greenville Greenies	Class D	Coastal Plain League	None	Guy Smith Stadium
1950–1951	2	Greenville Robins	Class D	Coastal Plain League	None	Guy Smith Stadium

== Notable alumni ==
- Johnny Allen (1928) MLB All-Star
- Luis Arroyo (1948) 2x MLB All-Star
- Fred Caligiuri (1937–1940)
- Bo Farley (1937, MGR)
- Randy Heflin (1950, MGR)
- Bobo Newsom (1928) 4x MLB All-Star
- Bill Phebus (1948, MGR)
- Vinnie Smith (1938–1939)
- Sid Varney (1949)
- Fred Williams (1949, MGR)

== See also ==
- Greenville Greenies players
