= Bucky Jacobs =

American baseball player (1913-1990)

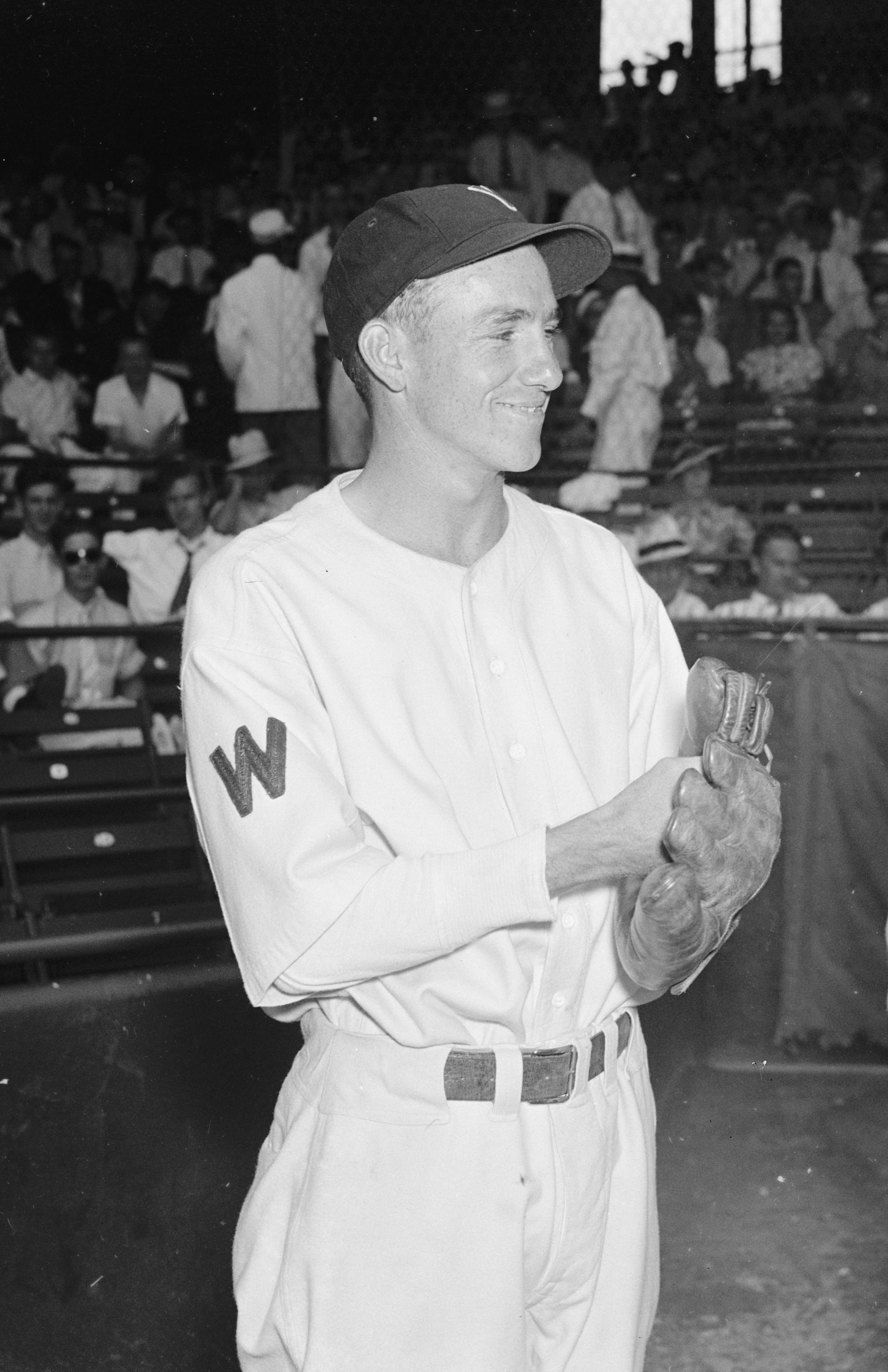
- Pitcher
- Born: March 21, 1913; Altavista, Virginia
- Died: June 15, 1990 (aged 77); Richmond, Virginia
- Batted: Right Threw: Right

MLB debut
- June 27, 1937, for the Washington Senators

Last MLB appearance
- June 1, 1940, for the Washington Senators

MLB statistics
- Win–loss record: 1–2
- Earned run average: 4.91
- Strikeouts: 15
- Stats at Baseball Reference

Teams
- Washington Senators (1937, 1939–1940)

Newton Smith "Bucky" Jacobs (March 21, 1913 – June 15, 1990) was a Major League Baseball pitcher who played for three seasons. He played for the Washington Senators for 11 games during the 1937 Washington Senators season, then for 11 combined games in 1939 and 1940. He played college baseball at the University of Richmond.
