= Erskine Mayer =

American baseball player (1889–1957)

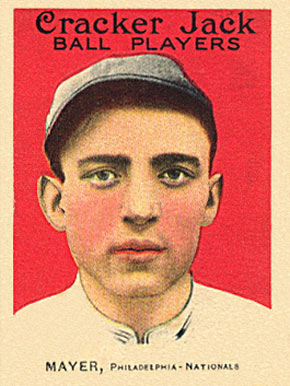
- Pitcher
- Born: January 16, 1889; Atlanta, Georgia, U.S.
- Died: March 10, 1957 (aged 68); Los Angeles, California, U.S.
- Batted: Right Threw: Right

MLB debut
- September 4, 1912, for the Philadelphia Phillies

Last MLB appearance
- September 27, 1919, for the Chicago White Sox

MLB statistics
- Win–loss record: 91–70
- Earned run average: 2.96
- Strikeouts: 482
- Stats at Baseball Reference

Teams
- Philadelphia Phillies (1912–1918); Pittsburgh Pirates (1918–1919); Chicago White Sox (1919)

Jacob Erskine Mayer (born James Erskine Mayer, January 16, 1889 – March 10, 1957) was an American professional baseball player who played for three different Major League Baseball teams during the 1910s. In his eight-year career, Mayer played for the Philadelphia Phillies, the Pittsburgh Pirates, and the Chicago White Sox.

A right-handed pitcher, Mayer's repertoire of pitches included a curveball which he threw from a sidearm angle. As a result of his curveball, then Brooklyn Dodgers manager Wilbert Robinson called Mayer "Eelskine" because the pitch was "so slippery."

Mayer won 20 games in a single season in both 1914 and 1915. He appeared in the 1915 World Series as a member of the Phillies and in the 1919 World Series as a member of the White Sox, a series noted for the Black Sox Scandal.

He was 91–70 in his career, with a 2.96 ERA. He was one of the all-time best Jewish pitchers in major league history through 2010, 3rd career-wise in ERA (behind only Barney Pelty and Sandy Koufax), 7th in wins, and 10th in strikeouts (482).

== Early life ==
Mayer was born in Atlanta, Georgia, and was Jewish. His paternal grandparents were Jews who immigrated to the US from Germany, and his father Isaac was a concert pianist and music teacher, and composed an opera in Hebrew. His maternal grandmother traced her ancestry back to the Mayflower, and converted to Judaism. His mother was born Henrietta Frankel. Both of his parents were Jewish.

Mayer attended the Georgia Military Academy. Mayer then enrolled at the Georgia Institute of Technology in 1907 in order to study engineering. During his years at Georgia Tech, Mayer pitched on the Yellow Jackets baseball team.

In 1910, after three years of school, Mayer left Georgia Tech to pursue a career in professional baseball. He was not the only one in his family to pursue a career in baseball. Sam Mayer, Erskine Mayer's older brother, appeared in 11 games for the 1915 Washington Senators.

== Minor league career ==
When Mayer left Georgia Tech in 1910, he signed first with the Atlanta Crackers and then with the Class D level Fayetteville Highlanders of the Eastern Carolina League. Mayer led the league with an .882 winning percentage (15–2), and the Highlanders won the league championship.

In 1911, Mayer played for the Albany Babies of the South Atlantic League where he won 14 games and lost 13. In 1912, Mayer joined the Portsmouth Pirates of the Virginia League. While with Portsmouth, Mayer won 26 games and lost just 9.

== Major league career ==
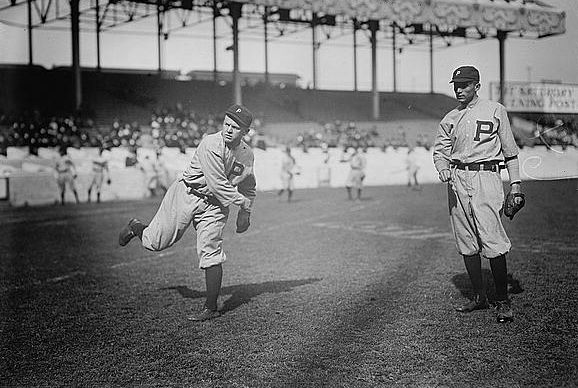
Otto Knabe and Erskine Mayer (right), 1913

On September 4, 1912, Mayer made his major league debut as a member of the Philadelphia Phillies in their game against the New York Giants. Mayer appeared in seven games that season, starting one and losing his only decision of the year.

Mayer spent his first full season in the major leagues in 1913. Unfortunately, Mayer's pitching was marked by a dubious moment. In the ninth inning of the Phillies August 18 game against the Chicago Cubs, Mayer set the Major League Baseball record for consecutive hits allowed (9). It was a record that remained unmatched for less than 24 hours as teammate Grover Cleveland Alexander repeated the feat the very next day.

1914 was the first of Mayer's back-to-back 20 win seasons, as he won 21 games, 7th-most in the National League. That year, Honus Wagner became the second member of the 3,000 hit club when he hit a double off Mayer. Wagner is the only player to get his 3,000th career hit off a pitcher who won 20 games that same season.

1915 was a successful year both for Mayer and for the Phillies. Mayer recorded 21 wins (3rd in the National League), 20 complete games, a .583 won-loss percentage (10th in the league), 114 strikeouts (9th in the league), and a 2.36 earned run average. Meanwhile, the Phillies won their first ever National League pennant with a 90-win season. Unfortunately for Mayer, the Phillies lost the 1915 World Series to the Boston Red Sox. Mayer started two games in that Series, and lost in his only decision. Mayer's first start came in Game 2; it marked the first time a Jewish player had appeared in a World Series game. Woodrow Wilson, then President of the United States, attended the game, the first time a United States President attended a World Series game.

1916 Mayer won seven games, but lost seven as well. 1917 was a better year for him. Mayer won 11 games against only six losses, had a .647 win–loss percentage (6th in the league), and had a 2.76 earned run average. In 1918, Mayer won seven games in 13 appearances for the Phillies. However, he was traded to the Pittsburgh Pirates for Elmer Jacobs in July, 1918. In 15 appearances for the Pirates, Mayer went 9–3 with a 2.26 earned run average. He finished with a combined record of 16–7 (his 16 wins were 7th in the National League) with a 2.65 earned run average and 18 complete games, and his .696 win–loss percentage was third-best in the league, as on defense he tied for the lead league among pitchers with a perfect fielding percentage.

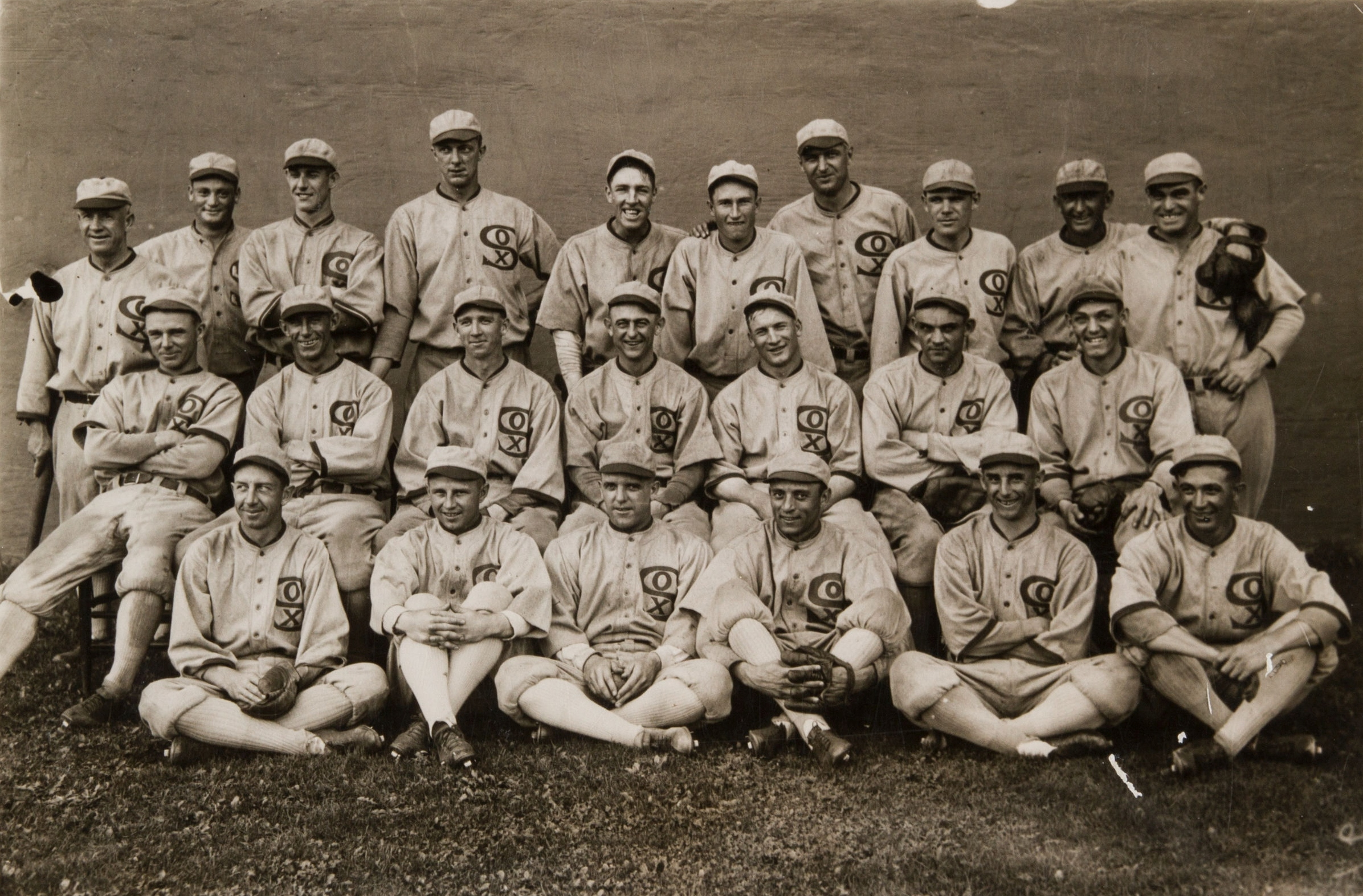
The 1919 Chicago White Sox, with Mayer in the bottom row, third from the right

Mayer started the 1919 season with the Pirates; however, in August of that year, the Chicago White Sox selected him off waivers. In exchange, the Pirates received $2,500 ($46,400 today). Mayer appeared in six regular season games for the White Sox and also pitched one inning in game 5 of the 1919 World Series. It was the final appearance of his major league career. When he retired after the season, he had won 91 games, 12 of them by shutout, with a 2.96 earned run average while pitching 93 complete games.

Mayer was a better than average hitting pitcher, posting a .185 batting average (84-for-453) with 39 runs, 2 home runs, 28 RBI and 28 bases on balls. Defensively, he recorded a .967 fielding percentage.

In 1920, Mayer played in one game for the minor league Atlanta Crackers of the Southern Association. He retired shortly thereafter. Three years later, in 1923, he briefly served as an umpire in the South Georgia League.

He was one of the all-time best Jewish pitchers in major league history through 2010, 3rd in career ERA (behind only Barney Pelty and Sandy Koufax), 7th in wins (91; directly behind Barney Pelty), and 10th in strikeouts (482; directly behind Scott Schoeneweis).

== Post-professional life ==
After retiring from professional sports, Mayer moved to Los Angeles. While there, he opened a cigar store. On March 10, 1957, he died of a heart attack. He was buried in Forest Lawn Memorial Park Cemetery in nearby Glendale, California.

== See also ==
- List of Jewish Major League Baseball players
- List of World Series starting pitchers
