= Guy Smith Stadium =

American sports venue

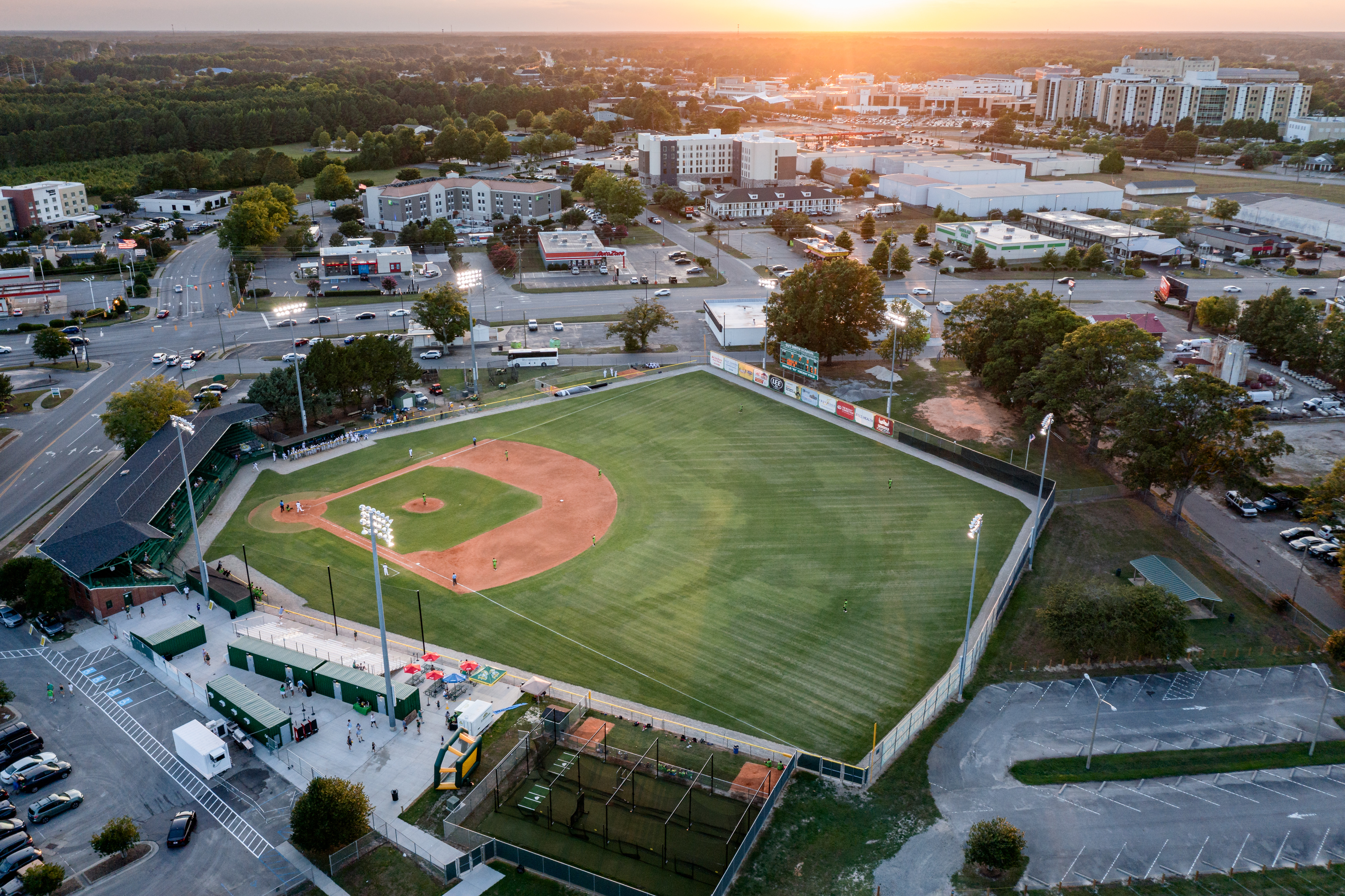
- Guy Smith Stadium in 2024

- Location within North Carolina Location within the United States
- Interactive map of Guy Smith Stadium
- Address: 1051 Moye Boulevard; Greenville, North Carolina
- Coordinates: 35°36′08″N 77°23′43″W
- Owner: City of Greenville
- Operator: City of Greenville
- Capacity: 3,000 (1939); 2,100 (1950); 1,500 (2024)
- Surface: Grass
- Field size: 320-365-320 (1939); 320-390-320 (1940)

Construction
- Opened: 1939
- Renovated: 2024
- Cost: $50,000 (1939) $1 million (2024)
- Builder: Works Project Administration

Tenants
- Greenville Yard Gnomes (CPL) 2024–present JH Rose High School; Greenville Greenies (CPL (D)) 1939–1941, 1946–1951; East Carolina Pirates football (NCAA) 1939–1941, 1946–1948

Guy Smith Stadium is a sports stadium in Greenville, North Carolina. It is primarily used for baseball and is the home of the Greenville Yard Gnomes, a collegiate summer baseball team in the Coastal Plain League.

Guy Smith Stadium was built by the Works Project Administration for $50,000 in 1939 (equivalent to $1,157,000 in 2025). The ballpark is located within Guy Smith Park at 1051 Moye Boulevard. In 2022, the baseball field at the stadium was officially named Ronald “RV” Vincent Field for the long-time JH Rose High School baseball coach who is the all-time winningest coach in North Carolina high school baseball history.

The Greenville Greenies played minor league baseball at the stadium as members of the Coastal Plain League (Class D) (1939–1941, 1946–1951). The Greenville Yard Gnomes started playing collegiate summer baseball at the stadium in the Coastal Plain League in the 2024 season. Stadium renovations for the 2024 season, at a cost of $1 million, include new seats, additional restroom facilities and concessions, a new hitting tunnel, and a new batting cage.
