= Greenville Yard Gnomes =

Coastal Plain League baseball team

- Logo

Information
- League: Coastal Plain League (East Division)
- Location: Greenville, North Carolina
- Ballpark: Guy Smith Stadium
- Founded: 2024
- Colors: Green and gold
- Mascot: Gnomeo
- Ownership: Jerry Petitt
- General manager: John McCormick
- Coach: Jack Schaffer
- Website: yardgnomesbaseball.com

The Greenville Yard Gnomes are a collegiate summer baseball team playing in the Coastal Plain League (CPL). The team plays its home games at Guy Smith Stadium in Greenville, North Carolina. The team began play in the CPL in the 2024 season and competes in the league's East division.

== History ==
In January 2023, representatives from Capitol Broadcasting Company reached out to the City of Greenville expressing interest in locating a new expansion Coastal Plain League team in Greenville to play collegiate summer baseball at Guy Smith Stadium. Capitol Broadcasting, a Raleigh-based media company and owner of the Durham Bulls and Holly Springs Salamanders, had previously acquired the CPL in fall 2022. Following several months of discussions, on April 20, 2023, Greenville's City Council voted unanimously to approve a letter of intent between the City of Greenville and Capitol Broadcasting Company to host a new Coastal Plain League baseball team at the city's Guy Smith Stadium. On May 11, 2023, the city council unanimously approved a 10-year lease of Guy Smith Stadium to Capitol Broadcasting and included an agreement for $1 million of stadium improvements funded 50–50 between the City of Greenville and Capitol Broadcasting.

In fall 2023, a naming contest was held to select a name for the expansion team. On January 24, 2024, the Coastal Plain League and Capitol Broadcasting unveiled the name of the team as the Greenville Yard Gnomes. In addition to unveiling the team name, the Yard Gnomes also announced the hiring of Michael Villafana as the inaugural general manager.

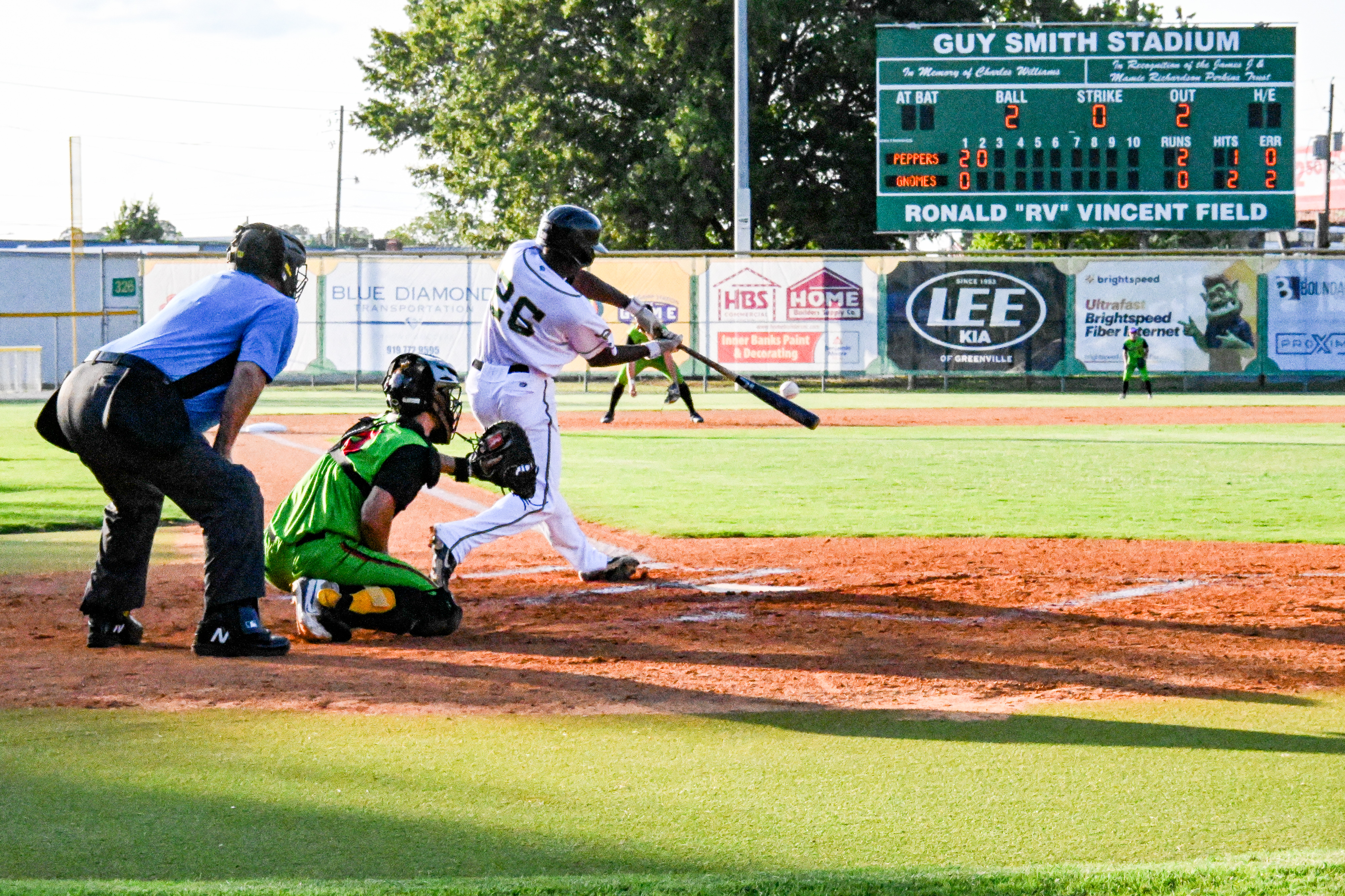
Greenville Yard Gnomes game at Guy Smith Stadium

The Yard Gnomes began play in the 2024 season, marking the return of summer baseball to Guy Smith Stadium after 73 years. The Greenville Greenies were a minor league baseball team that played from 1928 to 1951, including two stints in the original Coastal Plain League between 1934 and 1941, and again between 1946 and 1951. The Greenies played their home games at Guy Smith Stadium between 1941 and 1951.

Prior to the start of the 2024 season, Jack Schaffer was announced as the Yard Gnomes field manager. The team announced Schaffer would return as field manager for the 2025 season in January 2025 and for the 2026 season in November 2025.

The team's inaugural game was played on Friday, May 24, 2024, against the Tri-City Chili Peppers at home at Guy Smith Stadium. The Yard Gnomes finished the 2024 season with 12–34 record.

In November 2024, Capitol Broadcasting sold the franchise to CHA Baseball Management Company, a group led by Jerry Petitt, founder of the Coastal Plain League. The sale fulfilled a prior commitment made when Capitol Broadcasting acquired the CPL in 2022, under which the Petitt family retained the right to own a league franchise in the future. The City of Greenville approved a transfer of the lease for Guy Smith Stadium to Petitt on November 14, 2024.

On November 26, 2024, the Yard Gnomes announced John McCormick as the team's new general manager. McCormick replaced Michael Villafana, who was named general manager of the Holly Springs Salamanders.

== Branding and identity ==
The Coastal Plain League and Capitol Broadcasting unveiled the team name and brand on January 24, 2024, after an extensive public naming contest. The name Yard Gnomes was a variation on Garden Gnomes, one of five finalist names from the fall 2023 naming contest. "Yard" is a reference to a baseball field while "Gnomes" draws on the mythical lore of creatures guarding buried treasure, connecting to the pirate imagery of nearby East Carolina University. Team colors include gold (also a nod to the ECU Pirates) and green (Greenville and the Greenies). The Yard Gnomes' logo features local references including a wooden bat shaped like North Carolina with a skull-and-crossbones at Greenville's location as well as fonts used by the Greenies.

== Seasons ==
Season	Head Coach	Record	Postseason Record
2024	Jack Schaffer	12–34	—
2025	Jack Schaffer	20–26	—
Overall Record: 32–60 .348		Division Titles: 0	

== Stadium ==
Since its founding, the Yard Gnomes have played their home games at Guy Smith Stadium. Prior to the Yard Gnomes' inaugural season in 2024, the stadium underwent a $1 million renovation that added seats, restrooms, concessions, a hitting tunnel, and batting cage. The cost of the renovations were split between the City of Greenville and then-team owner Capitol Broadcasting.

== Alumni ==
These former Yard Gnomes were selected in the MLB Draft:

Player	School	Drafted	Parent Club	Season(s) with Yard Gnomes	Highest Level Reached	MLB Debut
JC Vanek	Chipola College	Round 14, 428th overall (2025)	Kansas City Royals	2024	Single-A	
