= Bill Phebus =

American baseball player (1909-1989)

- Pitcher
- Born: August 2, 1909; Cherryvale, Kansas, U.S.
- Died: October 11, 1989 (aged 80); Bartow, Florida, U.S.
- Batted: Right Threw: Right

MLB debut
- September 6, 1936, for the Washington Senators

Last MLB appearance
- May 16, 1938, for the Washington Senators

MLB statistics
- Win–loss record: 3–2
- Strikeouts: 18
- Earned run average: 3.31
- Stats at Baseball Reference

Teams
- Washington Senators (1936–1938)

Raymond William Phebus (August 2, 1909 – October 11, 1989) was an American Major League Baseball pitcher. He played parts of three seasons in the majors, from 1936 until 1938, for the Washington Senators.

After his playing career ended, Phebus briefly managed in minor league baseball. He was the manager of the Greenville Greenies in 1948 and the Dublin Green Sox in 1949.
