= Evergreen Burial Park =

Cemetery in Roanoke, Virginia

Coordinates: 37.26132°N 79.970614°W

- Interactive map of Evergreen Burial Park

Details
- Established: 1916
- Location: 1307 Summit Avenue SW, Raleigh Court, Roanoke, Virginia
- Country: USA
- Owned by: Evergreen Memorial Trust
- No. of graves: Over 25,000
- Website: https://evergreenburialpark.com/
- Find a Grave: Evergreen Burial Park

Evergreen Burial Park is a cemetery located at 1307 Summit Avenue, SW in the Raleigh Court neighborhood of Roanoke, Virginia. The cemetery began in 1916 in what was then Roanoke County.

The cemetery was designed by the Hare and Hare design firm of Kansas City, Missouri. There were nearly 25,000 burials in the 54-acre (220,000 m^{2}) cemetery by late 2011. A walking tour is available highlighting some of the more interesting individuals and stories of the social history of Roanoke.
