= Jerry Lynn (baseball) =

American baseball player (1916-1972)

- Second baseman
- Born: April 14, 1916; Scranton, Pennsylvania
- Died: September 25, 1972 (aged 56); Scranton, Pennsylvania
- Batted: Right Threw: Right

MLB debut
- September 19, 1937, for the Washington Senators

Last MLB appearance
- September 19, 1937, for the Washington Senators

MLB statistics
- Games played: 1
- At bats: 3
- Hits: 2
- Stats at Baseball Reference

Teams
- Washington Senators (1937)

Jerome Edward Lynn (April 14, 1916 – September 25, 1972) was a Major League Baseball second baseman. He played for the Washington Senators in 1937.

== Biography ==
Lynn began his professional baseball career in 1934. In 1936, he joined the Salisbury Indians of the Eastern Shore League and became their regular second baseman. The team became famous for forfeiting 21 wins at the start of the season before coming back to win the pennant. Lynn won the league batting title with a .342 average and was a unanimous selection to the all-star team. He was sold to the Senators at the end of the season. In his only major league game, he had two hits in three at-bats, one of them a double.

The following season, Lynn was sent to Charlotte of the Piedmont League. He played two seasons in the Class A Eastern League before spending 1941–1945 in the service. His last season in professional baseball was 1948.
