= Frank Trechock =

American baseball player (1915–1989)

- Shortstop
- Born: December 24, 1915; Windber, Pennsylvania, U.S.
- Died: January 16, 1989 (aged 73); Minneapolis, Minnesota, U.S.
- Batted: Right Threw: Right

MLB debut
- September 19, 1937, for the Washington Senators

Last MLB appearance
- September 19, 1937, for the Washington Senators

MLB statistics
- Games played: 1
- At bats: 4
- Hits: 2
- Stats at Baseball Reference

Teams
- Washington Senators (1937)

Frank Adam Trechock (December 24, 1915 – January 16, 1989) was an American professional baseball player who appeared in one game in Major League Baseball as a shortstop for the Washington Senators on September 19, 1937. Trechock's nine-year playing career began before World War II, and was interrupted by two years of service (1944 and 1945) in the United States Army.

== Biography ==
Trechock was a native of Windber, Pennsylvania, who batted and threw right-handed, stood 5 feet 10 inches (1.78 m) tall and weighed 175 pounds (79 kg). The 1937 season was Trechock's first in pro ball. After batting .338 with 19 home runs and 84 runs batted in in 96 games in the Class D Eastern Shore League, he was called to Washington in September and inserted into the Senator lineup at Griffith Stadium on Sunday afternoon, the 19th. Trechock singled twice in four at bats, participated in two double plays and committed two errors in the field. Both of his safeties came against Baseball Hall of Fame pitcher Ted Lyons of the Chicago White Sox.

His one day in the majors resulted in a .500 career batting average and a .750 fielding percentage. After 1939, the remainder of his career was spent at the highest level of minor league baseball. He retired after the 1951 campaign and died in Minneapolis, Minnesota on January 16, 1989, aged 73. He was buried in Fort Snelling National Cemetery.
