= Rocky Mount Pines =

- 1909–1980; (1980, 1962–1975, 1946–1952, 1936–1942, 1927–1929, 1920–1924, 1915–1917, 1909–1910); Rocky Mount, North Carolina

Minor league affiliations
- Class: Class A (1963–1975; 1980); Class B (1920–1924; 1936–1940; 1962); Class C (1915–1917; 1927); Class D (1909–1910; 1928–1929; 1941–1942; 1946–1952)
- League: Carolina League (1962–1975; 1980); Coastal Plain League (1946–1952); Bi-State League (1942); Coastal Plain League (1941); Piedmont League (1936–1940); Eastern Carolina League (1928–1929); Piedmont League (1927); Virginia League (1915–1917; 1920–1924); Eastern Carolina League (1909–1910)

Major league affiliations
- Team: Unaffiliated (1980; 1946–1952; 1941–1942); Philadelphia Phillies (1973–1975); Detroit Tigers (1965–1972); Washington Senators (1964); Cincinnati Reds (1962–1963); Boston Red Sox (1936–1940); Brooklyn Dodgers (1929); Unaffiliated prior to 1929

Minor league titles
- League titles (6): 1915; 1929; 1942; 1946; 1966; 1975

Team data
- Name: Rocky Mount Pines (1980); Rocky Mount Phillies (1973–1975); Rocky Mount Leafs (1941; 1947–1952; 1962–1963; 1965–1972); Rocky Mount Senators (1964); Rocky Mount Rocks (1942; 1946); Rocky Mount Red Sox (1936–1940); Rocky Mount Buccaneers (1927–1929); Rocky Mount Broncos (1924); Rocky Mount Tar Heels (1916–1917; 1920–1923); Rocky Mount Carolinians (1915); Rocky Mount Railroaders (1909–1910)
- Ballpark: Municipal Stadium

The Rocky Mount Pines was an American minor league baseball team located in Rocky Mount, North Carolina which competed in the Class A Carolina League for the 1980 season. They were the 42nd and final team to represent Rocky Mount in minor league baseball during the 20th century, beginning in 1909.

== History ==
The 1980 Rocky Mount Pines were unaffiliated with any Major League Baseball franchise or farm system, and played their home games at Municipal Stadium. The Pines were formed by owner Lou Haneles and led by manager Mal Fichman, and represented the return of professional baseball to Rocky Mount since the departure of the Rocky Mount Phillies in 1975.

The low light of the 1980 season came on August 29 when Durham Bulls pitcher Rick Behenna no-hit the Pines in an 8-0 victory. The Pines finished their lone season with a record of only 24 wins and 114 losses, the worst mark in Carolina League history. The Pines had losing streaks of 18, 14, 13, and 11 games, and drew a total 26,702 fans for the season. The franchise relocated the next year to Hagerstown, Maryland as the Hagerstown Suns (now the Frederick Keys).

=== Rocky Mount minor league history prior to 1980 ===
Rocky Mount minor league teams played as members of the Carolina League (1962–1975; 1980), Coastal Plain League (1946–1952), Bi-State League (1942), Coastal Plain League (1941), Piedmont League (1936–1940), Eastern Carolina League (1928–1929), Piedmont League (1927), Virginia League (1915–1917; 1920–1924), and Eastern Carolina League (1909–1910).

In addition to the Rocky Mount Phillies of 1973–1975, previous clubs were known as the Rocky Mount Senators (1964), Rocky Mount Rocks (1942; 1946), Rocky Mount Red Sox (1936–1940), Rocky Mount Buccaneers (1927–1929), Rocky Mount Broncos (1924), Rocky Mount Tar Heels (1916–1917; 1920–1923), Rocky Mount Carolinians (1915) and the original Rocky Mount Railroaders (1909–1910).

Rocky Mount teams were an affiliate of the Philadelphia Phillies (1973–1975), Detroit Tigers (1965–1972), Washington Senators (1964), Cincinnati Reds (1962–1963), Boston Red Sox (1936–1940) and Brooklyn Dodgers (1929). Rocky Mount won six league championships: in 1915, 1929, 1942, 1946, 1966 and 1975.

== The ballpark ==
Rocky Mount teams played at Municipal Stadium. Municipal Stadium was also Known "Briles Field" (1946), "Tar Heel Park" (1920-1929), and "Briles Park" (1915). The ballpark had a capacity of 4,500 (1920), 2,800 (1923), 3,200 (1936), 3,500 (1950) and 4,500 (1971). The field dimensions were (Left, Center, Right) 350-430-350 (1923), 300-430-350 (1936) and 350-350-346 (1971). The ballpark is still in use today, hosting youth baseball. The location is South Howell Street & O'Berry Street, Rocky Mount, North Carolina. The 1980 team played SEVERAL games in Wilson, NC at Fleming Stadium

== 1980 season results ==
Year	Name	League	Level	Affiliation	Record	Manager	Attendance	Playoffs	Most Valuable Player
1980	Pines	Carolina	A	Unaffiliated	24-114	Mal Fichman	26,702	None	Steve Swain

== Notable alumni (all 20th Century minor league teams) ==
=== Baseball Hall of Fame alumni ===
- Heinie Manush (1940, MGR) Inducted, 1964
- Tony Pérez (1962) Inducted, 2000
- Jim Thorpe (1909-1910) Inducted Pro Football Hall of Fame, 1963

=== Notable alumni ===
- Jim Bagby, Jr.
- Bill Butler
- Casey Cox
- Jack DiLauro
- Dick Drago
- Al Glossop
- Earl Johnson
- Gene Lamont
- Jim Leyland
- Elliott Maddox
- Lee May
- Eddie Pellagrini
- Johnny Pesky
- Greg Pryor
- Leon Roberts
- Jim Rooker
- Vern Ruhle
- Stan Spence
- Bobby Thomson
- César Tovar
- Bill Voiselle
- Charlie Wagner

== See also ==
- Rocky Mount Phillies
