= Curly Brown =

American baseball player (1888–1968)

- Pitcher
- Born: December 9, 1888; Spring Hill, Kansas, U.S.
- Died: June 10, 1968 (aged 79); Spring Hill, Kansas, U.S.
- Batted: Left Threw: Left

MLB debut
- September 8, 1911, for the St. Louis Browns

Last MLB appearance
- June 1, 1915, for the Cincinnati Reds

MLB statistics
- Win–loss record: 3–8
- Earned run average: 4.20
- Strikeouts: 52
- Stats at Baseball Reference

Teams
- St. Louis Browns (1911–1913); Cincinnati Reds (1915)

Charles Roy "Curly" Brown (December 9, 1888 – June 10, 1968) was an American professional baseball player. He was a left-handed pitcher over parts of four seasons (1911–13, 1915) with the St. Louis Browns and Cincinnati Reds. For his career, he compiled a 3–8 record, with a 4.20 earned run average, and 52 strikeouts in 128 2/3 innings pitched.
