= Harry Otis =

American baseball player (1886-1976)

- Pitcher
- Born: October 5, 1886; West New York, New Jersey
- Died: January 29, 1976 (aged 89); Teaneck, New Jersey
- Batted: Right Threw: Left

MLB debut
- September 5, 1909, for the Cleveland Naps

Last MLB appearance
- September 29, 1909, for the Cleveland Naps

MLB statistics
- Win–loss record: 2–2
- Earned run average: 1.37
- Strikeouts: 6
- Stats at Baseball Reference

Teams
- Cleveland Naps (1909)

Harry George Otis (October 5, 1886 – January 29, 1976) nicknamed "Cannonball" was an American Major League Baseball pitcher who played for one season. He pitched five games for the Cleveland Naps during the 1909 Cleveland Naps season.
