= Fayetteville, North Carolina minor league baseball history =

Fayetteville, North Carolina minor league baseball teams
- 1909–1956; (1909–1911, 1928–1929, 1946–1956); Fayetteville, North Carolina

Minor league affiliations
- Class: Class D (1909–1911, 1928–1929); Class B (1947–1948, 1952–1956)
- League: Eastern Carolina League (1909, 1911, 1928–1929); Eastern Carolina Association (1910); Coastal Plain League (1946); Tri-State League (1947–1948); Tobacco State League (1949); Carolina League (1950–1956)

Major league affiliations
- Team: Chicago Cubs (1946–1948); Philadelphia Athletics (1950–1953); Baltimore Orioles (1955); Cleveland Indians (1956)

Minor league titles
- League titles (4): 1910; 1948; 1953; 1956

Team data
- Name: Fayetteville Highlanders (1909–1911, 1928–1929); Fayetteville Cubs (1946–1948); Fayetteville Scotties (1949); Fayetteville Athletics (1950–1952); Fayetteville Hilanders (1953–1956); Fayetteville Woodpeckers (2019 -present)
- Ballpark: Cape Fear Fairgrounds Park (1909–1911); Highland Park Base Ball Grounds (1928–1929); Pittman Stadium (1946–1956)

Minor league baseball teams based in Fayetteville, North Carolina played between 1910 and 1956. Fayetteville teams played as members of the 1910 Eastern Carolina Association, the Eastern Carolina League in 1909, 1911, 1928 to 1929 and Carolina League from 1953 to 1956. The early minor league teams preceded today's Fayetteville Woodpeckers, who resumed minor league play in 2019, as members of the Carolina League.

The Fayetteville Hilanders were minor league affiliates of the Philadelphia Athletics in 1953, Baltimore Orioles in 1955 and Cleveland Indians in 1956.

Jim Thorpe, Olympic Champion and Pro Football Hall of Fame member played for the 1910 Fayetteville Highlanders.

== History ==
Beginning in 1909, Fayetteville first hosted minor league baseball, when the Fayetteville Highlanders joined the Eastern Carolina League, playing at Cape Fear Fairgrounds Park. The Fayetteville Highlanders continued as members of the Eastern Carolina League (1909, 1911, 1928–1929) and Eastern Carolina Association (1910). The Highlanders captured the 1910 Eastern Carolina Association Championship. Jim Thorpe, Olympic Champion and Pro Football Hall of Fame inductee played for the 1910 championship team.

The Fayetteville Cubs (1946–1948) were members of the Coastal Plain League (1946) and Tri-State League (1947–1948), playing at Pittman Stadium. The Fayetteville Cubs were an affiliate of the Chicago Cubs and captured the 1948 Tri-State League Championship.

In 1947, Rocky Marciano traveled to Fayetteville with friends to try out for the Fayetteville Cubs team. Marciano lasted three weeks before being cut from the team. He then returned home to Brockton, Massachusetts and began his professional boxing career.

In 1949, the Fayetteville Scotties played as members of Tobacco State League.

The Fayetteville Athletics began play in the 1950 Carolina League, finishing 47–106 in their first season. They were an affiliate of the Philadelphia Athletics (1950–1952). The Athletics had a regular season record of 59–79 in 1951 and 93–73 in 1952, finishing in seventh place both seasons.

The 1953 Fayetteville Hilanders continued play in the Carolina league. The Hilanders captured Carolina League Championships in 1953 (86–51) and 1956 (78–71). The Hilanders were affiliates of the Philadelphia Athletics (1953), Baltimore Orioles (1955) and Cleveland Indians (1956).

Minor league baseball returned in 1987 when the Fayetteville Generals began play as members of the Class A level South Atlantic League as a minor league affiliate of the Detroit Tigers. Today, the Fayetteville Woodpeckers are an affiliate of the Houston Astros and continue play as members of the Class A Carolina League.

== The ballparks ==
The 1909 and 1911 Highlanders were noted to have played home minor league games at Cape Fear Fairgrounds Park. The ballpark was located on Gillespie Street in Fayetteville, North Carolina. today, the site has a marker for a Babe Ruth home run, that has his first professional home run, hit in a March 1914 spring training game.

The Highland Park Base Ball Grounds was referenced to have hosted the Highlanders in 1928 and 1929. Highland Park Base Ball Grounds had a capacity of 300 and was located at Grove (3B) Street at Cross Creek in Fayetteville, North Carolina. It was on the Cape Fear River. Today, the site hosts the Cape Fear Botanical Gardens.

Beginning in 1946, Fayetteville teams were noted to have played home games at Pittman Stadium. The ballpark had a capacity of 4,000 (1950) and dimensions of (Left, Center, Right): 350-400-330. It was located on Bragg Boulevard in Fayetteville, North Carolina. For a time, it was known as Cumberland Memorial Stadium.

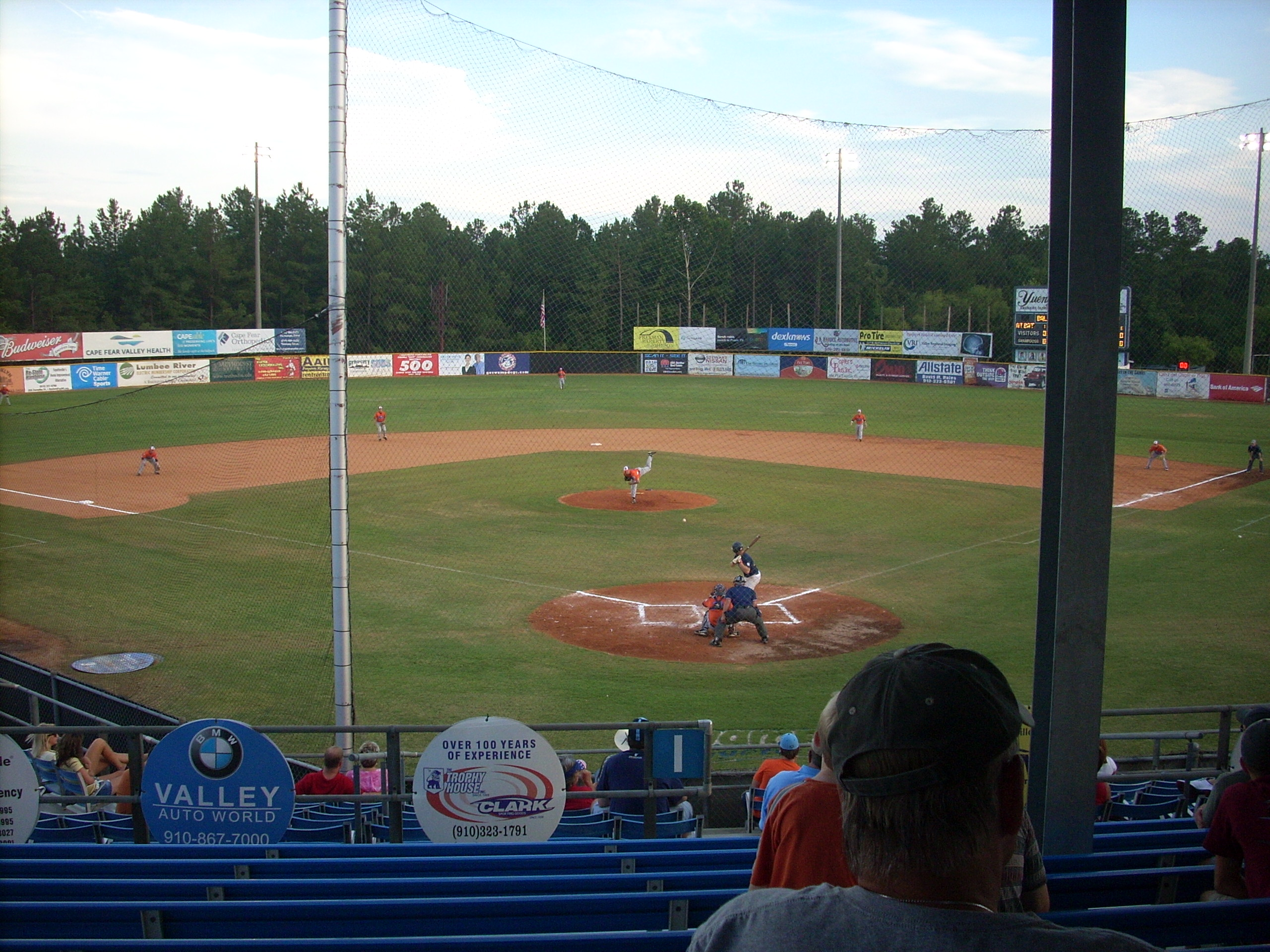
(2011) J. P. Riddle Stadium. Fayetteville, North Carolina

== Notable alumni ==
- Johnny Allen (1928) MLB All-Star
- Jim Brosnan (1948)
- Smoky Burgess (1947) 9x MLB All-Star; Cincinnati Reds Hall of Fame
- Jack McKeon (1955, MGR) Manager: 2003 World Series Champion - Florida Marlins; 2× NL Manager of the Year (1999, 2003);San Diego Padres Hall of Fame
- Erskine Mayer (1910)
- Van Mungo (1929) 5x MLB All-Star
- Dan Osinski (1956)
- Arnie Portocarrero (1950)
- Aaron Robinson (1954-1955, MGR) MLB All-Star
- Jim Thorpe (1910) Olympic Champion; Pro Football Hall of Fame
- Pep Young (1928)

== See also ==
Fayetteville Highlanders players

== See also ==
- Fayetteville, North Carolina
