= 2025 Tampa Bay Rowdies season =

Tampa Bay Rowdies
2025 season
- Chairman: Stuart Sternberg (until September 30); Patrick Zalupski (since September 30)
- Head coach: Steve Coleman (interim)
- Stadium: Al Lang Stadium
- USL Championship: Conference: 10th Overall: 19th
- USL Cup playoffs: DNQ
- U.S. Open Cup: Round of 32
- USL Cup: Group stage
| Home colors | Away colors | Third colors |

The 2025 Tampa Bay Rowdies season was the Tampa Bay Rowdies' sixteenth season of existence, their ninth in the United Soccer League, and seventh in the USL Championship. Including the previous Tampa Bay Rowdies, this was their 32nd season of a franchise in the Tampa Bay metro area with the Rowdies moniker. Including the now-defunct Tampa Bay Mutiny, this was the 37th season of professional soccer in the Tampa Bay region.

In celebration of the 50th anniversary of the founding of the original NASL Tampa Bay Rowdies, the club utilized retro uniforms that take inspiration from the original team's uniforms, alongside a unique crest. Co-insiding with their anniversary, the club was able to return to long-time home stadium Al Lang Stadium, having to have completed the 2024 season at IMG Academy due to damage caused by Hurricane Helene.

During early April, due to poor performance, the club fired second year head coach Robbie Neilson, replacing him with assistant coach Steve Coleman in the interim. In the middle of the season, as a part of a deal mainly revolving the Tampa Bay Rays, the Rowdies were sold by long time owner Stuart Sternberg to an ownership group headed by Patrick Zalupski.

== Club ==
=== Roster ===
As of June 9, 2025

| Squad No. | Name | Nationality | Position(s) | Since | Date of birth (age) | Signed from | Games played | Goals scored |
Goalkeepers
| 24 | Bill Hamid | (United States) | GK | 2025 | November 25, 1990 (age 35) | (United States) Miami FC | | 0 |
| 35 | Caleb Klepacz | (United States) | GK | 2025 | May 9, 2008 (age 17) | (United States) Tampa Bay United Rowdies SC | | 0 |
| 41 | Ethan Bandré | (United States) | GK | 2025 | September 14, 1998 (age 27) | (United States) Colorado Rapids | | 0 |
Defenders
| 2 | Robert Castellanos | (United States) | DF | 2025 | May 11, 1998 (age 27) | (United States) Sporting Kansas City | | |
| 3 | Forrest Lasso | (United States) | DF | 2023 | May 11, 1993 (age 32) | (Sweden) GIF Sundsvall | | |
| 14 | Thomas Vancaeyezeele | (French Guiana) | DF | 2025 | July 27, 1994 (age 31) | (United States) Hartford Athletic | | |
| 26 | Joey Skinner | (United States) | DF | 2025 | March 28, 2003 (age 22) | (United States) Nashville SC | | |
| 27 | Laurence Wyke | (England) | DF | 2025 | September 20, 1996 (age 29) | (United States) Phoenix Rising FC | | |
| 33 | Aarón Guillén | (Mexico) | DF | 2020 | June 23, 1993 (age 32) | (United States) North Carolina FC | | |
| 34 | Matheus De Jesus | (United States) | DF | 2024 | December 16, 2005 (age 20) | (United States) Tampa Bay Rowdies U23 | | |
Midfielders
| 4 | Lewis Hilton | (England) | MF | 2020 | October 22, 1993 (age 32) | (United States) Saint Louis FC | | |
| 8 | Ollie Bassett | (Northern Ireland) | MF | 2025 | March 6, 1998 (age 27) | (Canada) Atlético Ottawa | | |
| 10 | Leo Fernandes | (Brazil) | MF | 2017 | December 23, 1991 (age 34) | (United States) Philadelphia Union | | |
| 11 | Blake Bodily | (United States) | MF | 2024 | January 13, 1998 (age 28) | (United States) San Diego Loyal | | |
| 17 | Daniel Crisostomo | (United States) | MF | 2024 | January 16, 1997 (age 29) | (United States) Los Angeles FC 2 | | |
| 18 | Nathan Worth | (United States) | MF | 2024 | February 26, 2007 (age 19) | (United States) FC Tulsa | | |
| 20 | Nick Moon | (United States) | MF | 2024 | May 31, 1996 (age 29) | (United States) San Diego Loyal | | |
| 47 | Luis Álvarez | (Argentina) | MF | 2025 | January 25, 2003 (age 23) | (United States) Charlotte Independence | | |
Forwards
| 7 | Pacifique Niyongabire | (Burundi) | RW | 2024 | March 15, 2000 (age 25) | (Canada) Valour FC | | |
| 9 | Manuel Arteaga | (Venezuela) | CF | 2024 | June 17, 1994 (age 31) | (United States) Phoenix Rising FC | | |
| 21 | Endri Mustali | (United States) | CF | 2024 | June 7, 2007 (age 18) | (United States) Tampa Bay United Rowdies SC | | |
| 28 | Eddie Munjoma | (Canada) | LW | 2025 | May 11, 2001 (age 24) | On loan from (United States) Nashville SC | | |
| 36 | Alex Rodriguez | (United States) | CF | 2025 | November 20, 2006 (age 19) | (United States) Florida Premier FC | | |

=== Team management and staff ===
Front Office
| Owner | (United States) Stuart Sternberg |
| Head of Soccer Operations | (Argentina) Nico Castillo |
| Vice President | (United States) Ryan Helfrick |
| Vice chairman | (United States) Matthew Silverman |
| Vice chairman | (United States) Brian Auld |

Coaching Staff
| Head Coach | (United States) Steve Coleman (interim) |
| Goalkeeping Coach | (England) Stuart Dobson |
| Assistant Coach | (England) Nicky Law |
| Assistant Coach | (England) Russell Stirling |
| Performance Coach | (Colombia) Carlos Wheeler |

== Competitions ==
=== Friendlies ===
| February 8 Preseason 1 | Tampa Bay Rowdies | 6—2 | Philadelphia Union II | Clearwater, Florida |
| 1:00 PM | Bassett; MacPherson; Arteaga; Pacius, Fernandes | Report |

| February 11 Preseason 2 | Tampa Bay Rowdies | 0—1 | New England Revolution | Bradenton, Florida |
| 12:00 PM | | | Panayotou 10' | Stadium: IMG Academy |

| February 15 Preseason 3 | Tampa Bay Rowdies | 1—3 | CF Montréal | Auburndale, Florida |
| 6:00 PM | Pacius 66' | | Vilsaint 29', 54'; Ibrahim 67' | Stadium: Lake Myrtle Sports Complex |

| February 19 Preseason 4 | Tampa Bay Rowdies | 3–0 | Tormenta FC | Tampa, Florida |
| 1:30 PM | MacPherson 7'; Arteaga 19' trialist 2nd half' | | | Stadium: Waters Training Facility |

| February 22 Preseason 5 | Tampa Bay Rowdies | 0–0 | USF Bulls | Florida |
| 7:30 PM | | | | Stadium: Al Lang Stadium |

| February 28 Preseason 6 | Tampa Bay Rowdies | 4–0 | Naples United | Tampa, Florida |
| 5:00 PM | Arteaga 10', 37'; Bassett 23'; Pacius 54' | | (yellow card) 81' | Stadium: Waters Training Facility |

| June 11 Midseason | Tampa Bay Rowdies (United States) | 0–7 | (Portugal) Benfica | Tampa, Florida |
| 10:00 AM | | | | Stadium: Waters Training Facility |

=== USL Championship ===
==== Standings ====
| Pos | Team | Pld | W | L | T | GF | GA | GD | Pts | Qualification |
|---|---|---|---|---|---|---|---|---|---|---|
| 8 | Detroit City FC | 30 | 9 | 11 | 10 | 33 | 35 | −2 | 37 | Playoffs |
| 9 | Indy Eleven | 30 | 10 | 15 | 5 | 44 | 52 | −8 | 35 | |
| 10 | Tampa Bay Rowdies | 30 | 9 | 14 | 7 | 43 | 50 | −7 | 34 | |
| 11 | Miami FC | 30 | 8 | 16 | 6 | 29 | 44 | −15 | 30 | |
| 12 | Birmingham Legion FC | 30 | 5 | 13 | 12 | 36 | 50 | −14 | 27 | |

Source: USL Championship Standings
Rules for classification: 1) head-to-head points; 2) head-to-head goal differential; 3) points-per-game within conference; 4) total wins; 5) total goal differential; 6) total goals scored; 7) points earned against top four Conference finishers; 8) disciplinary points; 9) coin toss or drawing of lots

==== Match results ====
On December 19, 2024, the USL Championship released the regular season schedule for all 24 teams.

===== March =====
| March 8 1 | Las Vegas Lights FC | 1–0 | Tampa Bay Rowdies | Las Vegas, Nevada |
| 7:00 PM | Pinzon 74' | Report | | Stadium: Cashman Field; Attendance: 3,258; Referee: Brandon Stevis |

| March 15 2 | FC Tulsa | 1–0 | Tampa Bay Rowdies | Tulsa, Oklahoma |
| 7:00 PM CDT | Seagrist 73' | Report | | Stadium: ONEOK Field; Attendance: 3,621 |

| March 22 3 | Miami FC | 1–2 | Tampa Bay Rowdies | Miami, Florida |
| 7:00 pm EDT | Bonfiglio 2'; Verón (yellow card) 51'; Blanco (yellow card) 56'; Mercado (yellow card) 73' (red card) 90+3'; Celeste (yellow card) 87' | Report | Pacius 31'; Crisostomo 45+2' (yellow card) 76'; Bodily (yellow card) 64'; Bassett (yellow card) 67'; Arteaga (yellow card) 90+3' | Stadium: South Dade Kia Field at Pitbull Stadium; Attendance: 1,012; Referee: Alex Billeter |

===== April =====
| April 5 4 | Charleston Battery | 2–1 | Louisville City FC | Mount Pleasant, SC |
| | Jennings 45'+1' (pen.); Myers 73' | Report | Pacius 75' | Stadium: Patriots Point Soccer Complex; Attendance: 3,510; Referee: Joshua Encarnación |

| April 12 5 | Tampa Bay Rowdies | 1–2 | Loudoun United FC | St. Petersburg, Florida |
| 4:30 PM EDT | Pacius 90'+4' | Report | Aboukoura 69' (pen.); Leggett 85' | Stadium: Al Lang Stadium; Attendance: 6,088; Referee: Brandon Stevis |

| April 19 6 | Tampa Bay Rowdies | 1–2 | Louisville City FC | St. Petersburg, Florida |
| | Bassett 58' | Report | Davila 69'; Gleadle 74' | Stadium: Al Lang Stadium; Attendance: 6,263; Referee: Elijio Arreguin |

===== May =====
| May 3 7 | Tampa Bay Rowdies | 2–2 | Birmingham Legion FC | St. Petersburg, Florida |
| | Fernandes 26' (pen.); Niyongabire 90+3'; Lasso (yellow card) 90+6' | Report | Martínez 70'; Trejo 76'; Tabortetaka (yellow card) 90+5' | Stadium: Al Lang Stadium; Attendance: 4,504; Referee: Abdou Ndiaye |

| May 10 8 | Tampa Bay Rowdies | 1–3 | Charleston Battery | St. Petersburg, Florida |
| | Pacius 77' | Report | Jennings 7' (pen.); Myers 19', 28' | Stadium: Al Lang Stadium; Attendance: 5,273; Referee: Gerald Flores |

| May 17 9 | Tampa Bay Rowdies | 0–3 | Rhode Island FC | St. Petersburg, Florida |
| 7:30PM | Lasso (yellow card) 19'; Wyke (yellow card) 21' (yellow-red card) 78' | Report | Holstad 45+5'; Herivaux 73' (yellow card) 90'; Fuson 87'; Shapiro-Thompson (yellow card) 90+1' | Stadium: Al Lang Stadium; Attendance: 4,810; Referee: Elvis Osmanovic |

| May 24 10 | Lexington SC | 1–1 | Tampa Bay Rowdies | Lexington, Kentucky |
| | Ajago 31'; Greene (yellow card) 35'; Burks (yellow card) 71' | Report | Arteaga 62' | Stadium: Lexington SC Stadium; Attendance: 4,533; Referee: Matthew Corrigan |

===== June =====
| June 7 11 | Louisville City FC | 2–1 | Tampa Bay Rowdies | Louisville, Kentucky |
| | Goodrum 7'; Serrano 16' | Report | Pacius 31' | Stadium: Lynn Family Stadium; Attendance: 8,147; Referee: Trevor Wiseman |

| June 14 12 | Tampa Bay Rowdies | 2–1 | Miami FC | St. Petersburg, Florida |
| | Guillen 74'; Arteaga 90'+2' | Report | Bonfiglio 42' | Stadium: Al Lang Stadium; Attendance: 4,717; Referee: Luis Arroyo |

| June 21 13 | Pittsburgh Riverhounds SC | 2–1 | Tampa Bay Rowdies | Pittsburgh, Pennsylvania |
| | Vancaeyezeele 15' (o.g.); Williams 20' | Report | Arteaga 40' | Stadium: Highmark Stadium; Attendance: 5,028; Referee: Natalie Simon |

| June 25 14 | Tampa Bay Rowdies | 3–1 | Indy Eleven | St. Petersburg, Florida |
| 9:00 PM EST | Arteaga (penalty missed) 54'; Guillén (yellow card) 55'; Bodily 60'; Moon 69'; Wyke 90+3'; Pacius (yellow card) 90+5' | Report | Kizza (yellow card) 43'; Foster 45+1', (yellow card) 66'; Rendón (yellow card) 45+4'; Hogan (yellow card) 68'; Lindley (yellow card) 82' | Stadium: Al Lang Stadium; Attendance: 3,692; Referee: Jeremy Scheer |

===== July =====
| July 12 15 | San Antonio FC | 1–0 | Tampa Bay Rowdies | San Antonio, Texas |
| | Berrón (yellow card) 43'; Haakenson 90+5' | Report | Forrest Lasso (yellow card) 29' (yellow-red card) 67'; Wyke (yellow card) 51'; Guillén (yellow card) 83' | Stadium: Toyota Field; Attendance: 5,969; Referee: Edson Carvajal |

| July 16 16 | Hartford Athletic | 0–1 | Tampa Bay Rowdies | Hartford, Connecticut |
| | | Report | Vancaeyezeele (yellow card) 24'; Fernandes (yellow card) 55'; Pacius 83'; Wyke (yellow card) 90+1'; Hilton (yellow card) 90+3' | Stadium: Trinity Health Stadium; Attendance: 5,500; Referee: Cristian Campo Hernández |

===== August =====
| August 2 17 | Indy Eleven | 1–3 | Tampa Bay Rowdies | Indianapolis, IN |
| | Ofeimu 44' | Report | Pacius 12'; Alvarez 57'; Skinner 90+8' | Stadium: Carroll Stadium; Attendance: 9,107; Referee: Abdou Ndiaye |

| August 9 18 | North Carolina FC | 2–1 | Tampa Bay Rowdies | Cary, North Carolina |
| | Conway 39'; Pérez 45'+6' (pen.) | Report | Hilton 23' | Stadium: WakeMed Soccer Park; Attendance: 2,500; Referee: Muhammad Kaleia |

| August 16 19 | Tampa Bay Rowdies | 1–1 | Phoenix Rising FC | St. Petersburg, Florida |
| | Arteaga 75' | Report | Rizzo 73' | Stadium: Al Lang Stadium; Attendance: 4,547; Referee: Muhammad Hassan |

| August 23 20 | Detroit City FC | 2–0 | Tampa Bay Rowdies | Hamtramck, MI |
| 7:00 PM EDT | Diouf 30'; Smith 39' | Report | | Stadium: Keyworth Stadium; Attendance: 6,686; Referee: John Matto |

| August 30 21 | Tampa Bay Rowdies | 2–1 | Pittsburgh Riverhounds SC | St. Petersburg, Florida |
| 7:30 PM | Hilton 64'; Pacius 75' | Report | Ahl 2' | Stadium: Al Lang Stadium; Attendance: 4,375; Referee: Servando Berna Rico |

===== September =====
| September 6 22 | Tampa Bay Rowdies | 0–2 | Sacramento Republic FC | St. Petersburg, Florida |
| 7:30 PM | | Report | López 29'; Cicerone 90'+1' | Stadium: Al Lang Stadium; Attendance: 3,820; Referee: Matthew Thompson |

| September 13 23 | Tampa Bay Rowdies | 3–3 | Colorado Springs Switchbacks FC | St. Petersburg, Florida |
| 7:30 PM | Marie 8'; Pacius 21'; Castellanos 25' | Report | Tejada 17', 32'; Micaletto 58' | Stadium: Al Lang Stadium; Attendance: 3,734; Referee: Luis Arroyo |

| September 17 24 | Birmingham Legion FC | 1–4 | Tampa Bay Rowdies | Birmingham, Alabama |
| 7:00 PM | McCartney 12' | Report | Arteaga 64'; Marie 68', 89'; Álvarez 90'+8' | Stadium: Protective Stadium; Attendance: 5,113; Referee: John Griggs |

| September 20 25 | Tampa Bay Rowdies | 2–2 | North Carolina FC | St. Petersburg, Florida |
| 7:00 PM | Arteaga 37'; Pacius 82' | Report | Conway 14'; Anderson 90'+5' | Stadium: Al Lang Stadium; Attendance: 5,160; Referee: Corbyn May |

| September 28 26 | Loudoun United FC | 2–2 | Tampa Bay Rowdies | Leesburg, Virginia |
| 7:00 PM | Aboukoura 90'+1' (pen.); Tubbs 90'+6' | Report | Arteaga 56' (pen.); Skinner 90'+8' | Stadium: Segra Field; Attendance: 2,640; Referee: Thomas Snyder |

===== October =====
| October 4 27 | Tampa Bay Rowdies | 4–0 | Monterey Bay FC | St. Petersburg, Florida |
| | Pacius 35', 73'; Crisostomo 62'; Arteaga 88' | Report | | Stadium: Al Lang Stadium; Attendance: 4,778; Referee: Brandon Stevis |

| October 11 28 | Rhode Island FC | 5−0 | Tampa Bay Rowdies | Pawtucket, Rhode Island |
| | Williams 8' 45+1' (pen.); Stoneman (yellow card) 10'; Fuson 28' (yellow card) 90+1'; Dikwa 69'; Rodriguez 88' | Report | Guillén (yellow card) 78'; Arteaga (yellow card) 80' | Stadium: Centreville Bank Stadium; Attendance: 10,621; Referee: Jeremy Scheer |

| October 18 29 | Tampa Bay Rowdies | 3−2 | Hartford Athletic | St. Petersburg, Florida |
| 7:30 PM EDT | Arteaga 8'; Pacius 25'; Méndez 56' | Report | Ngalina 45+2', 90+2' | Stadium: Al Lang Stadium; Attendance: 4,527; Referee: Elton García |

| October 25 30 | Tampa Bay Rowdies | 1–1 | Detroit City FC | St. Petersburg, Florida |
| 7:30 PM EDT | Lasso (yellow card) 55'; Pacius 81' | Report | Ry. Williams (yellow card) 42'; LeFlore 58'; Michael Bryant (soccer) (yellow card) 71'; Amoo-Mensah (yellow card) 90+6' | Stadium: Al Lang Stadium; Attendance: 7,326; Referee: Elijio Arreguin |

=== USL Cup ===
The Rowdies participated in the second edition of the USL Cup, the first edition to feature teams from both the USL Championship and League One.

==== Standings ====
| Pos | Lg | Team | Pld | W | PKW | PKL | L | GF | GA | GD | Pts | Qualification |
|---|---|---|---|---|---|---|---|---|---|---|---|---|
| 1 | USL1 | Greenville Triumph SC | 4 | 3 | 0 | 0 | 1 | 6 | 3 | +3 | 9 | Advance to knockout stage |
| 2 | USLC | Tampa Bay Rowdies | 4 | 2 | 0 | 1 | 1 | 8 | 6 | +2 | 7 | |
| 3 | USL1 | South Georgia Tormenta FC | 4 | 2 | 0 | 1 | 1 | 8 | 7 | +1 | 7 | |
| 4 | USLC | Miami FC | 4 | 1 | 1 | 0 | 2 | 7 | 9 | −2 | 5 | |
| 5 | USLC | Charleston Battery | 4 | 1 | 1 | 0 | 2 | 5 | 6 | −1 | 5 | |

Updated to match(es) played on July 26, 2025. Source: USL

==== Group stage ====
| April 26, 2025 | Tampa Bay Rowdies | 3–3 (3–4 p) | Miami FC | St. Petersburg, Florida |
| 7:30 PM EDT | Pacius 8'; Castellanos 28'; Arteaga 32' | Report | Blanco 57' (pen.); Zárate 60'; Melano 77' | Stadium: Al Lang Stadium; Attendance: 5,103; Referee: Benjamin Meyer |
| | Penalties |
| | Bassett (penalty scored); Arteaga (penalty scored); Fernandes (penalty scored); Crisostomo (penalty missed); Mustali (penalty missed); Worth (penalty missed) | | (penalty missed) Akinyode; (penalty scored) Lawrence; (penalty scored) Gavilanes; (penalty scored) Celeste; (penalty missed) Cardona; (penalty scored) Hoyos |

| May 31, 2025 | Tampa Bay Rowdies | 2–1 | South Georgia Tormenta FC | St. Petersburg, Florida |
| 7:30 PM EDT | Pacius 79'; Bassett 90+4' | Report | Vivas 28' | Stadium: Al Lang Stadium; Attendance: 3,789; Referee: Atahan Yaya |

| July 4, 2025 | FC Naples | 0–2 | Tampa Bay Rowdies | Naples, Florida |
| 8:00 PM EDT | Ferrin (yellow card) 74'; Cisneros (yellow card) 76' | Report | Vancaeyezeele (yellow card) 26'; Pacius 38'; Arteaga 60'; Lasso (yellow card) 61'; Wyke (yellow card) 90+3' | Stadium: Paradise Coast Sports Complex Stadium; Attendance: 3,472; Referee: Calin Radosav |

| July 26, 2025 | Charleston Battery | 2–1 | Tampa Bay Rowdies | Mount Pleasant, South Carolina |
| 7:30 PM EDT | Ycaza (yellow card) 39'; Castellanos og' (45+4); Myers 71' | Report | Bodily (yellow card) 40'; Hilton (yellow card) 45+1'; Crisostomo (yellow card) 63'; Skinner 90+1' | Stadium: Patriots Point Soccer Complex; Attendance: 3,599; Referee: Thomas Snyder |

=== U.S. Open Cup ===
The Rowdies, as a member of the second division USL Championship, entered the U.S. Open Cup in the Third Round based on its performance in the 2024 USL Championship season.

| April 16, 2025 | FC Naples (USL1) (Florida) | 1–1 (a.e.t.) (8–9 p) | Tampa Bay Rowdies (USLC) (Florida) | Naples, Florida |
| 7:00 p.m. EDT | Prpa 27' | Report | Niyongabire 26' | Stadium: Paradise Coast Sports Complex Stadium; Attendance: 3,418; Referee: Muhammad Hassan |
| | Penalties |
| | Henderlong (penalty scored); Onen (penalty scored); Dengler (penalty scored); Heckenberg (penalty missed); Cerro (penalty scored); Pasnik (penalty scored); Evans (penalty scored); Torrellas (penalty scored); Fernandes (penalty scored); Cisneros (penalty missed) | | Bassett (penalty scored); Fernandes (penalty missed); MacPherson (penalty scored); Crisotomo (penalty scored); Pacius (penalty scored); Mustali (penalty scored); Castellanos (penalty scored); Skinner (penalty scored); Vancaeyezeele (penalty scored); Lasso (penalty scored) |

| May 7, 2025 | Tampa Bay Rowdies (Florida) | 0–5 | (Florida) Orlando City SC | St. Petersburg, Florida |
| 7:30 p.m. EDT | | Report | Caraballo 34', 36'; Enrique 42'; McGuire 59'; Þórhallsson 90' | Stadium: Al Lang Stadium; Attendance: 3,735; Referee: Natalie Simon |
