= 2025 Miami FC season =

Miami FC
2025 season
- Owner: Riccardo Silva
- Head coach: Gastόn Maddoni
- Stadium: Pitbull Stadium; Miami, Florida
- USL Championship: Eastern Conf.: 12th Overall: 24th
- U.S. Open Cup: Second Round
- Top goalscorer: League: Kevin Hoyos (1 goal); All: Francisco Bonfiglio (14 goals)
- Highest home attendance: 1,394
- Lowest home attendance: 1,027
- Biggest win: MIA 4–1 NAP (3/18) USOC
- Biggest defeat: MIA 0–2 DET (3/8) USLC
- All statistics correct as of 16:49, March 20, 2025 (UTC).

The 2025 Miami FC season was the club's sixth season in the USL Championship, the second-tier of American soccer, and eleventh overall.

== Roster ==
As of December 26, 2024

Appearances and goals are career totals from all-competitions and leagues.

No.	Name	Nationality	Position	Date of birth (age)	Signed from	Signed in	Contract ends	Apps.	Goals
Goalkeepers
1	Khadim Ndiaye	(Senegal)	GK	April 12, 2000 (age 25)	(Bulgaria) FC Hebar Pazardzhik	2023		12	0
Defenders
2	Allan Aniz	(Brazil)	DF	May 11, 2003 (age 22)	(Brazil) SC Internacional U-20	2024		2	0
3	Jordan Ayimbila	(Ghana)	DF	February 14, 2001 (age 25)	Las Vegas Lights FC	2023		21	0
4	Nicolás Cardona	(Puerto Rico)	DF	February 11, 1999 (age 27)	Chattanooga Red Wolves SC	2023		30	0
13	Daltyn Knutson	(United States)	DF	March 1, 1997 (age 29)	Tormenta FC	2024	2025	32	0
29	Alejandro Mitrano	(Venezuela)	DF	April 4, 1998 (age 27)	Las Vegas Lights FC	2024	2025	34	0
	Bolu Akinyode	(Nigeria)	MF	May 30, 1994 (age 31)	El Paso Locomotive FC	2025		98	2
Midfielders
99	Allen Gavilanes	(United States)	MF	August 24, 1999 (age 26)	Greenville Triumph SC	2023	2025	34	5
Forwards
19	Michael Lawrence	(United States)	FW	July 10, 1999 (age 26)	Miami FC	2024	2025	18	3
50	Roberto Molina	(El Salvador)	FW	January 28, 2001 (age 25)	Indy Eleven	2024	2024	27	1

=== Staff ===
- (Argentina) Gastόn Maddoni – Head coach
- (Argentina) Matias Farao – Assistant coach
- (Argentina) Cristian Blanco – Goalkeeper coach
- (United States) Lucas Vaeza – Strength and performance coach

== Transfers ==
=== In ===
#	Pos.	Player	Signed from	Details	Date	Source
21	DF	(Nigeria) Bolu Akinyode	(United States) El Paso Locomotive FC	Free transfer	January 21, 2025	
2	DF	(United States) Jonathan Ricketts	(United States) Sacramento Republic FC	Transfer, undisclosed details	January 22, 2025	
	MF	(Argentina) Matías Romero	(Argentina) Instituto Atlético Central Córdoba	Free transfer	January 27, 2025	
17	FW	(Puerto Rico) Ricardo Rivera	(Dominican Republic) O&M FC	Free transfer	January 30, 2025	
10	MF	(Argentina) Sebastián Blanco	(Argentina) San Lorenzo de Almagro	Free transfer	January 31, 2025	
26	FW	(Argentina) Lucas Melano	(Azerbaijan) Neftçi PFK	Free transfer	February 5, 2025	
	MF	(Argentina) Diego Mercado	(Argentina) Ferro Carril Oeste	Free transfer	February 6, 2025	
6	DF	(Israel) Walid Yacoubou	(United States) Memphis 901 FC	Free transfer	February 7, 2025	
28	GK	(United States) Bill Hamid	(United States) Virginia Dream FC	Free transfer	February 10, 2025	
29	FW	(United States) Kevin Hoyos	Unattached	Free transfer	February 11, 2025	
11	MF	(Argentina) Deian Verón	(Argentina) Estudiantes de La Plata	Free transfer	February 13, 2025	
16	MF	(Puerto Rico) Gerald Díaz	(Puerto Rico) Academia Quintana	Free transfer	February 16, 2025	
30	MF	(Argentina) Cristian Vázquez	Vinotinto F.C. Ecuador	Free transfer	February 18, 2025	
22	MF	(Argentina) Francesco Celeste	(Venezuela) Zamora F.C.	Free transfer	February 20, 2025	
12	GK	(Germany) Rafael Martell	(Argentina) Club Atlético Brown	Free transfer	February 21, 2025	
	FW	(Argentina) Tobías Zárate	(Greece) Athlitiki Enosi Larissa F.C.	Free transfer	February 26, 2025	
	FW	(Argentina) Francisco Bonfiglio	(Argentina) Club Atlético Tucumán	Free transfer	February 27, 2025	

=== Out ===
#	Pos.	Player	Signed to	Details	Date	Source
5	MF	(Jamaica) Joey DeZart	Unattached	End of contract	November 30, 2024	
15	DF	(Nigeria) Mujeeb Murana	Unattached	End of contract	November 30, 2024	
17	FW	(United States) Khalid Balogun	(United States) Lexington SC	End of loan	November 30, 2024	
18	DF	(Colombia) Junior Palacios	Unattached	End of contract	November 30, 2024	
30	MF	(Haiti) Christopher Jean-Francois	(United States) Miami FC Academy	End of academy contract	November 30, 2024	
31	GK	(Uruguay) Felipe Rodriguez	(United States) Miami FC Academy	End of academy contract	November 30, 2024	
33	MF	(United States) Lucas De Paula	(United States) Miami FC Academy	End of academy contract	November 30, 2024	
34	DF	(Spain) Marco Santana	(United States) Miami FC Academy	End of academy contract	November 30, 2024	
35	FW	(Haiti) Sébatien Joseph	(United States) Miami FC Academy	End of academy contract	November 30, 2024	
50	FW	(El Salvador) Roberto Molina	Unattached	End of contract	November 30, 2024	
7	FW	(Brazil) Luis "Luisinho" Pedro	(Brazil) Esporte Clube São Luiz	Mutual contract termination	December 26, 2024	
8	MF	(Brazil) Gabriel Cabral	(United States) South Georgia Tormenta FC	Contract option not extended	December 26, 2024	
9	FW	(Colombia) Isaac Zuleta	Unattached	Contract option not extended	December 26, 2024	
12	GK	(United States) Daniel Gagliardi	Unattached	Contract option not extended	December 26, 2024	
14	DF	(United States) Daniel Barbir	(United States) Lexington SC	Transfer	December 26, 2024	
23	FW	(Italy) Rocco Genzano	Unattached	Mutual contract termination	December 26, 2024	
11	FW	(Cuba) Frank López	(United States) El Paso Locomotive FC	Transfer, undisclosed details	January 22, 2025	
16	MF	(Italy) Manuel Botta	(Italy) FBC Gravina	Free transfer	January 30, 2025	

=== Loan out ===
#	Pos.	Player	Loaned to	Details	Date	Source
3	DF	(Ghana) Jordan Ayimbila	(United States) Chattanooga Red Wolves SC	Season-long	February 24, 2025	

== Friendlies ==
February 14 Preseason	Miami FC	5–0	FIU Panthers	Miami, Florida
1:00 pm EST	Blanco 10'; Rivera 50', 80'; Trialist 55'; Hoyos 67'	Report		Stadium: FIU Soccer Stadium

February 22 Preseason	Barry Buccaneers	0–2	Miami FC	Miami Shores, Florida
11:00 am EST		Report	Gavilanes 50'; Rivera 60'	Stadium: Buccaneer Field

February 25 Preseason	Miami FC	3–1	Palm Beach Atlantic Sailfish	Miami, Florida
1:00 pm EST	Gavilanes 25'; Díaz 50'; Ricketts 60'	Report	Goal	Stadium: FIU Intramural Field

February 28 Preseason	Miami FC	2–3	Miami United FC	Miami, Florida
8:30 am EST	Cardona 25'; Hoyos 50'	Miami FC Report; Miami United Report	Morales; Mazzetta	Stadium: FIU Intramural Field
Note: Two games, the first was a full 90 minutes, which Miami United won 3–2, and a second game of 45 minutes between academy players, which Miami United won 3–1.

== Competitive ==
=== USL Championship ===
==== Standings — Eastern Conference ====
Pos	Team	Pld	W	L	T	GF	GA	GD	Pts	Qualification
1	Louisville City FC (S)	30	22	1	7	56	19	+37	73	Playoffs
2	Charleston Battery	30	19	6	5	62	32	+30	62	Playoffs
3	North Carolina FC	30	13	11	6	40	39	+1	45	Playoffs
4	Pittsburgh Riverhounds SC (C)	30	12	10	8	32	28	+4	44 (Note: Pittsburgh Riverhounds SC are ahead of Hartford Athletic on head-to-head points. PGH 6, HFD 0.)	Playoffs
5	Hartford Athletic	30	13	12	5	48	36	+12	44	Playoffs
6	Loudoun United FC	30	12	12	6	45	48	−3	42	Playoffs
7	Rhode Island FC	30	10	12	8	29	28	+1	38	Playoffs
8	Detroit City FC	30	9	11	10	33	35	−2	37	Playoffs
9	Indy Eleven	30	10	15	5	44	52	−8	35	
10	Tampa Bay Rowdies	30	9	14	7	43	50	−7	34	
11	Miami FC	30	8	16	6	29	44	−15	30	
12	Birmingham Legion FC	30	5	13	12	36	50	−14	27	

Source: USL Championship Standings
(C) Champions; (S) Players' Shield winner

==== Results summary ====
Overall								Home						Away					
Pld	W	D	L	GF	GA	GD	Pts	W	D	L	GF	GA	GD	W	D	L	GF	GA	GD
21	6	5	10	22	31	−9	23	3	3	6	13	19	−6	3	2	4	9	12	−3

Last updated: August 23, 2025.
Source: Match reports

==== Matches ====
March 8 1	Miami FC	0–2	Detroit City FC	Miami, Florida
7:00 pm EST	Blanco (yellow card) 17'; Romero (yellow card) 30'; Bonfiglio (yellow card) 39', (red card) 42'; Díaz (yellow card) 69'; Ricketts (yellow card) 77'; (yellow card) 85'	Report	Polisi (yellow card) 24'; Bryant 31'; Rutz 87'	Stadium: South Dade Kia Field at Pitbull Stadium; Attendance: 1,394

March 15 2	Miami FC	1–3	Indy Eleven	Miami, Florida
6:30 pm EDT	Hoyos 65'; Celeste (yellow card) 67'; Romero (yellow card) 90+1'	Report	Blake 3' (pen.); Quinn 18'; Hogan 35'	Stadium: South Dade Kia Field at Pitbull Stadium; Attendance: 1,027

March 22 3	Miami FC	1–2	Tampa Bay Rowdies	Miami, Florida
7:00 pm EDT	Bonfiglio 2'; Verón (yellow card) 51'; Blanco (yellow card) 56'; Mercado (yellow card) 73' (red card) 90+3'; Celeste (yellow card) 87'	Report	Pacius 31'; Crisostomo 45+2' (yellow card) 76'; Bodily (yellow card) 64'; Bassett (yellow card) 67'; Arteaga (yellow card) 90+3'	Stadium: South Dade Kia Field at Pitbull Stadium; Attendance: 1,012; Referee: Alex Billeter

March 29 4	Miami FC	0–1	New Mexico United	Miami, Florida
7:00 pm EDT	Melano (yellow card) 34'	Report	Vargas (yellow card) 45+3'; Fernando 70'	Stadium: South Dade Kia Field at Pitbull Stadium; Attendance: 1,006; Referee: Alejo Calume

April 12 5	San Antonio FC	1–2	Miami FC	San Antonio, Texas
7:30 pm CDT	Paredes (yellow card) 45+1'; Blanco (yellow card) 45+2'; Crognale (yellow card) 65'; Hernandez (yellow card) 90+10'	Report	Mercado (yellow card) 8'; Knutson 25' (yellow card) 87'; Bonfiglio 27'; Vázquez (yellow card) 34'; Romero (yellow card) 50'; Hamid (yellow card) 75'; Mitrano (yellow card) 85'; Verón (yellow card) 90+10'	Stadium: Toyota Field; Attendance: 7,078; Referee: Alex Beehler

April 19 6	Miami FC	2–1	North Carolina FC	Miami, Florida
7:00 pm EDT	Bonfiglio 18'; Knutson 26'; Mercado (yellow card) 30'; Zárate (yellow card) 82'	Report	Hodge (yellow card) 25'; Craig 45+2'	Stadium: South Dade Kia Field at Pitbull Stadium; Attendance: 1,103; Referee: Atahan Yaya

May 4 7	Monterey Bay FC	1–1	Miami FC	Seaside, California
4:00 pm PDT	Paul 9' (yellow card) 17'; Guzmán (yellow card) 60'	Report	Zárate (yellow card) 19'; Ricketts (yellow card) 50'; Bonfiglio 87'; Rivera (yellow card) 90+5'	Stadium: Cardinale Stadium; Attendance: 4,179; Referee: Brad Jensen

May 17 8	Miami FC	2–1	Loudoun United FC	Miami, Florida
7:30 pm EST	Bonfiglio 4'; Vázquez (yellow card) 19'; Blanco (yellow card) 25'; Melano 34' (yellow card) 50'; Ricketts (yellow card) 79'; Mercado (yellow card) 90+1'; Verón (yellow card) 90+4'; Zárate (yellow card) 90+5' (red card) 90+8'	Report	Nyeman (yellow card) 12'; Abdellatif Aboukoura 26' (pen.) (yellow card) 79'	Stadium: South Dade Kia Field at Pitbull Stadium; Attendance: 1,257; Referee: Muhammad Kaleia

May 24 9	Miami FC	1–2	Birmingham Legion FC	Miami, Florida
7:00 pm EST	Bonfiglio 39' (yellow card) 70'; Melano (yellow card) 45+1'	Report	Pasher 48'; Damus 74'; Suárez (yellow card) 84'; Van Oekel (yellow card) 90+7'	Stadium: South Dade Kia Field at Pitbull Stadium; Attendance: 1,011; Referee: Natalie Simon

June 7 10	Rhode Island FC	0–1	Miami FC	Pawtucket, RI
7:00PM	Herivaux (yellow card) 56'; Holstad (yellow card) 74'	Report	Vázquez (yellow card) 7'; Bent (yellow card) 33'; Blanco 54'; Bonfiglio (yellow card) 73'; Akinyode (yellow card) 90+6'	Stadium: Centreville Bank Stadium; Attendance: 7,508; Referee: Calin Radosav

June 14 11	Tampa Bay Rowdies	2–1	Miami FC	St. Petersburg, Florida
	Guillen 74'; Arteaga 90'+2'	Report	Bonfiglio 42'	Stadium: Al Lang Stadium; Attendance: 4,717; Referee: Luis Arroyo

June 18 12	Miami FC	1–0	Charleston Battery	Miami, Florida
	Romero 51'	Report		Stadium: Pitbull Stadium; Attendance: 927; Referee: Luis Arroyo

June 21 14	Detroit City FC	2–0	Miami FC	Hamtramck, MI
4:00 PM EDT	Cedeño 44'; Sheldon (yellow card) 52'; Smith (penalty missed) 62'; Diouf 90+5'	Report	Vázquez (yellow card) 7'; Ricketts (yellow card) 30'; Mercado (yellow card) 38'; Lawrence (red card) 86'	Stadium: Keyworth Stadium; Attendance: 6,004; Referee: Brandon Stevis

July 5 14	Miami FC	2–2	FC Tulsa	Miami, Florida
7:00 PM EDT	Bonfiglio 17' (pen.), 65'; Romero (red card) 45+4'	Report	Calheira 13' (pen.); Goldthorp 45+1'	Stadium: Pitbull Stadium; Attendance: 1,008; Referee: John Matto

July 12 15	Miami FC	1–1	Lexington SC	Miami, Florida
	Bonfiglio 24'	Report	Burke 90'+3'	Stadium: Pitbull Stadium; Attendance: 1,014; Referee: Elvis Osmanovic

July 19 16	Charleston Battery	0−1	Miami FC	Mount Pleasant, South Carolina
	Romero 51'	Report		Stadium: Patriots Point Soccer Complex; Attendance: 927; Referee: Luis Arroyo

July 19 17	Pittsburgh Riverhounds SC	1–1	Miami FC	Pittsburgh, Pennsylvania
	Ahl 90'+5'	Report	Bonfiglio 83'	Stadium: Highmark Stadium; Attendance: 5,095; Referee: John Griggs

August 6 18	Hartford Athletic	2–0	Miami FC	Hartford, Connecticut
	Moreira 46'; Dieng 73' (Pen.)	Report		Stadium: Trinity Health Stadium; Attendance: 5,365; Referee: Thomas Snyder

August 9 19	Miami FC	0–0	El Paso Locomotive FC	Miami, Florida
	Veron (yellow card) 77' (yellow-red card) 90'+6'	Report		Stadium: Pitbull Stadium; Attendance: 1,496; Referee: Elton García

August 16 20	Miami FC	2–4	Louisville City FC	Miami, Florida
7:30 PM	Melano 22'; Knutson 25'	Report	Goodrum 12', 23'; Mcfadden 63'; Wilson 80'	Stadium: Pitbull Stadium; Attendance: 1,233; Referee: Rodrigo Albuquerque

August 23 21	Indy Eleven	3−2	Miami FC	Indianapolis, Indiana
7:00 PM EST	Blake 45+1' 69'; Hogan 51'	Report	Bonfiglio 21'; Hoyos 90+1'	Stadium: Carroll Stadium; Attendance: 9,942; Referee: Carlos Rodriguez

August 30 22	Loudoun United FC	3–1	Miami FC	Leesburg, Virginia
7:00 PM EDT	Ricketts 6' (o.g.); Ordóñez 53'; Ryan 90'	Report	Bonfiglio 25'	Stadium: Segra Field; Attendance: 2,553; Referee: Ekaterina Koroleva

September 6 23	Miami FC	0–1	Hartford Athletic	Miami, Florida
7:30 PM		Report	Panayotou 54'	Stadium: Pitbull Stadium; Attendance: 1,202; Referee: Muhammad Hassan

September 13 24	Las Vegas Lights FC	0–0	Miami FC	Las Vegas, Nevada
10:30 PM		Report		Stadium: Cashman Field; Attendance: 3,576; Referee: Abdou Ndiaye

September 19 25	Miami FC	0−1	Rhode Island FC	Miami, Florida
7:00 PM	Bonfiglio (yellow card) 52'; Knutson (yellow card) 86'; Yacoubou (yellow card) 90'	Report	Kwizera 68' (pen.); Bacharach (yellow card) 82'	Stadium: FIU Soccer Stadium / Leyva Family Field; Attendance: 768; Referee: Cristian Campo

September 26 26	North Carolina FC	1–0	Miami FC	Cary, North Carolina
	Conway 13'	Report		Stadium: WakeMed Soccer Park; Attendance: 3,774; Referee: Edson Carvajal

October 4 27	Miami FC	3–0	Pittsburgh Riverhounds SC	Miami, Florida
7:00 PM	Zárate 48', 59'; Gavilanes 82'	Report	Ahl 22'	Stadium: Pitbull Stadium; Attendance: 2,033; Referee: Drew Klemp

October 11 28	Louisville City FC	1–0	Miami FC	Louisville, Kentucky
7:30 PM	Ownby 88'	Report		Stadium: Lynn Family Stadium; Attendance: 10,237; Referee: Amin Hadzic

October 19 29	Birmingham Legion FC	2–3	Miami FC	Birmingham, Alabama
	Paterson 15'; Damus 66'	Report	Bonfiglio 8'; Ricketts 22'; Campisi (red card) 23'; Zárate 38'	Stadium: Protective Stadium; Referee: Robert Vincze

October 25 30	Sacramento Republic FC	0–1	Miami FC	Sacramento, California
10:00 PM		Report	Knutson 87'	Stadium: Heart Health Park; Attendance: 11,569; Referee: Joe Surgan

=== USL Cup ===
On December 12, 2024, the United Soccer League announced an expansion of the USL Cup, known as the Jägermeister Cup for sponsorship reasons. All clubs from the second division USL Championship and third division USL League One will compete in a world cup style, interleague competition.

Miami was drawn into Group 6.

==== Standings — Group 6 ====
Pos	Lg	Team	Pld	W	PKW	PKL	L	GF	GA	GD	Pts	Qualification
1	USL1	Greenville Triumph SC	4	3	0	0	1	6	3	+3	9	Advance to knockout stage
2	USLC	Tampa Bay Rowdies	4	2	0	1	1	8	6	+2	7	
3	USL1	South Georgia Tormenta FC	4	2	0	1	1	8	7	+1	7	
4	USLC	Miami FC	4	1	1	0	2	7	9	−2	5	
5	USLC	Charleston Battery	4	1	1	0	2	5	6	−1	5	
6	USL1	FC Naples	4	1	0	0	3	4	7	−3	3	

Updated to match(es) played on July 26, 2025. Source: USL

==== Results summary ====
Overall								Home						Away					
Pld	W	D	L	GF	GA	GD	Pts	W	D	L	GF	GA	GD	W	D	L	GF	GA	GD
4	2	0	2	7	9	−2	6	1	0	1	4	4	0	1	0	1	3	5	−2

Last updated: July 27, 2025.
Source: Match reports

==== Matches ====
===== Group stage =====
April 26	Tampa Bay Rowdies	3–3 (3–4 p)	Miami FC	St. Petersburg, Florida
7:30 PM EDT	Pacius 8'; Castellanos 28'; Arteaga 32'; Guillén (yellow card) 56'	Report	Blanco 57' (pen.); Zárate 60'; Melano (yellow card) 69' (goal) 77'; Bonfiglio (yellow card) 82'; Knutson (yellow card) 84'	Stadium: Al Lang Stadium; Attendance: 5,103; Referee: Benjamin Meyer
	Penalties
	Bassett (penalty scored); Arteaga (penalty scored); Fernandes (penalty scored); Crisostomo (penalty missed); Mustali (penalty missed); Worth (penalty missed)		(penalty missed) Akinyode; (penalty scored) Lawrence; (penalty scored) Gavilanes; (penalty scored) Celeste; (penalty missed) Cardona; (penalty scored) Hoyos

May 31	Miami FC	3–2	FC Naples	University Park, Florida
7:30 PM EDT	Ricketts 36'; Mercado 50'; Lawrence 76'	Report	O'Connor 44'; Cisneros 47'	Stadium: South Dade Kia Field at Pitbull Stadium; Attendance: 1,208; Referee: Greg Dopka

June 28	Greenville Triumph SC	2–0	Miami FC	Greenville, South Carolina
7:00 PM EDT	Robles 46'; Anguiano 85'	Report		Stadium: Paladin Stadium; Attendance: 2,085; Referee: Edson Carvajal

July 26	Miami FC	1–2	South Georgia Tormenta FC	University Park, Florida
7:00 PM EDT	Hoyos 41'	Report	Tunbridge 54'; Doyle 60'	Stadium: South Dade Kia Field at Pitbull Stadium; Attendance: 1,024; Referee: Jeremy Scheer

=== U.S. Open Cup ===
The Miami FC, as a member of the second division USL Championship, entered the U.S. Open Cup in the First Round based on the club's performance in the 2024 USL Championship season.

March 15 First Round	Miami FC (Florida)	4–1	(Florida) Naples United FC	Miami, Florida
7:00 pm EDT	Knutson (yellow card) 35'; Bonfiglio 41', 45+1'; Gavilanes 66'; Zárate 69'	Report	Furione (yellow card) 45+3'; Marisi (yellow card) 49'; Moreno (yellow card) 81', (goal) 83'	Stadium: FIU Soccer Stadium; Referee: Edson Carvajal

April 1 Second Round	Inter Miami II (Florida)	0–1	(Florida) Miami FC	Fort Lauderdale, Florida
7:30 pm EDT	Abadia-Reda (yellow card) 13'; Ferraina (yellow card) 69'; Fung (yellow card) 75'; Basabe (yellow card) 82'	Report	Mercado (yellow card) 47'; Ricketts (yellow card) 64'; Bonfiglio 84'; Verón (yellow card) 89'; Bent (yellow card) 90+5'	Stadium: Chase Stadium; Attendance: 1,500; Referee: Jonathan Bilinski

April 16 Third Round	Indy Eleven (Indiana)	1–0 (a.e.t.)	(Florida) Miami FC	Indianapolis, Indiana
7:30 pm EDT	Neidlinger (yellow card) 5'; Soumaoro (yellow card) 27'; Ofeimu (yellow card) 61'; White 120+3'	Report	Gavilanes (yellow card) 41'; Cardona (yellow card) 42'; Knutson (yellow card) 51'	Stadium: Michael A. Carroll Stadium; Attendance: 4,366; Referee: Calin Radosav
