= 2025 Loudoun United FC season =

Loudoun United FC
2025 season
- Head coach: Ryan Martin
- Stadium: Segra Field
- USL Championship: Conference: 6th
- USLC Playoffs: Conference Quarter-Finals
- U.S. Open Cup: Third round
- USL Cup: Quarterfinals
Home colors	Away colors

The 2025 season was Loudoun United FC's seventh season of existence, and their seventh in the second-division of American soccer, the USL Championship. During the season, Loudoun qualified for the first post-season appearance in franchise history, ultimately bowing out of the playoffs in the Eastern Conference Quarter-Finals.

== Club ==
=== Roster ===
As of September 10, 2025

Note: Flags indicate national team as defined under FIFA eligibility rules; some limited exceptions apply. Players may hold more than one non-FIFA nationality.

No.	Pos.	Nation	Player
3	DF	USA	Keegan Tingey
4	MF	USA	Tommy McCabe
5	DF	FRA	Yanis Leerman
6	DF	CAN	Kwame Awuah
8	MF	USA	Moses Nyeman
9	FW	GUA	Arquímides Ordóñez
10	MF	FRA	Florian Valot
11	FW	EGY	Abdellatif Aboukoura
12	MF	USA	Drew Skundrich
13	MF	USA	Alex Nagy
14	FW	USA	Zach Ryan
15	FW	NZL	Riley Bidois
16	DF	USA	Cole Turner

No.	Pos.	Nation	Player
17	MF	POR	Pedro Santos
19	MF	ETH	Surafel Dagnachew
20	MF	USA	Ben Mines
21	DF	NGA	Bolu Akinyode
22	DF	USA	Robby Dambrot
23	GK	FRA	Hugo Fauroux
24	DF	USA	Jacob Erlandson
26	MF	GUY	Omari Glasgow (on loan from Chicago Fire)
30	GK	USA	Ryan Jack
32	DF	USA	Garrison Tubbs
33	DF	ITA	Luca Piras
89	GK	USA	Lorenzo Herrera-Rauda

Signed to first team contract with D.C. United.
Signed from youth academy.

=== Out on loan ===
Note: Flags indicate national team as defined under FIFA eligibility rules; some limited exceptions apply. Players may hold more than one non-FIFA nationality.

No.	Pos.	Nation	Player
1	GK	USA	Dane Jacomen (on loan to Westchester SC)

=== Staff ===
As of September 4, 2025

Executive
Executive Business Officer	(United States) Angela Baroni Berzonsky
Team President	(England) Karl Sharman
General Manager	(Germany) Niko Eckart
Assistant GM & Soccer Operations Manager	(United States) Logan Angert
Director of Scouting	(Canada) Alen Marcina
Technical staff
Head Coach	(United States) Ryan Martin
First Assistant Coach	(Argentina) Victor Lonchuk
Assistant Coach	(United States) Jonathan Rojas
Assistant Coach	(United States) Zachary Johnson
Assistant Coach	(United States) Kristi Beckman
Goalkeeping Coach	(Poland) Jack Stefanowski
Head Athletic Trainer	(United States) Drazan Vukovic
Equipment Manager	(United States) Bryan Pineda

== Competitions ==
=== USL Championship ===
==== Standings ====
Pos	Team	Pld	W	L	T	GF	GA	GD	Pts	Qualification
4	Pittsburgh Riverhounds SC (C)	30	12	10	8	32	28	+4	44 (Note: Pittsburgh Riverhounds SC are ahead of Hartford Athletic on head-to-head points. PGH 6, HFD 0.)	Playoffs
5	Hartford Athletic	30	13	12	5	48	36	+12	44	Playoffs
6	Loudoun United FC	30	12	12	6	45	48	−3	42	Playoffs
7	Rhode Island FC	30	10	12	8	29	28	+1	38	Playoffs
8	Detroit City FC	30	9	11	10	33	35	−2	37	Playoffs

Source: USL Championship Standings
Rules for classification: 1) head-to-head points; 2) head-to-head goal differential; 3) points-per-game within conference; 4) total wins; 5) total goal differential; 6) total goals scored; 7) points earned against top four Conference finishers; 8) disciplinary points; 9) coin toss or drawing of lots
(C) Champions

==== Match results ====
On December 19, 2024, the USL Championship released the regular season schedule for all 24 teams.

March 8, 2025 1	Birmingham Legion FC	1–3	Loudoun United FC	Birmingham, Alabama
8:00 PM EDT		Report		Stadium: Protective Field

March 15, 2025 2	North Carolina FC	1–2	Loudoun United FC	Cary, North Carolina
8:00 PM EDT		Report		Stadium: WakeMed Soccer Park

March 22, 2025 3	Louisville City FC	2–0	Loudoun United FC	Louisville, Kentucky
4:00 PM EDT		Report		Stadium: Lynn Family Stadium

March 29, 2025 4	Loudoun United FC	2–0	Rhode Island FC	Leesburg, Virginia
7:00 PM EDT		Report		Stadium: Segra Field

April 5, 2025 5	Loudoun United FC	2–0	Hartford Athletic	Leesburg, Virginia
7:30 PM EDT		Report		Stadium: Segra Field

April 12, 2025 6	Tampa Bay Rowdies	1–2	Loudoun United FC	St. Petersburg, Florida
4:30 PM EDT				Stadium: Al Lang Stadium

April 19, 2025 7	Loudoun United FC	2–1	Pittsburgh Riverhounds SC	Leesburg, Virginia
7:30 PM EDT				Stadium: Segra Field

May 3, 2025 8	Las Vegas Lights FC	1–0	Loudoun United FC	Las Vegas, Nevada
10:30 PM EDT				Stadium: Cashman Field

May 10, 2025 9	Loudoun United FC	5–1	Lexington SC	Leesburg, Virginia
7:30 PM EDT				Stadium: Segra Field

May 17, 2025 10	Miami FC	2–1	Loudoun United FC	Miami, Florida
7:30 PM EDT	Bonfiglio 4'; Vázquez (yellow card) 19'; Blanco (yellow card) 25'; Melano 34' (yellow card) 50'; Ricketts (yellow card) 79'; Mercado (yellow card) 90+1'; Verón (yellow card) 90+4'; Zárate (yellow card) 90+5' (red card) 90+8'	Report	Nyeman (yellow card) 12'; Abdellatif Aboukoura 26' (pen.) (yellow card) 79'	Stadium: Pitbull Stadium; Attendance: 1,257; Referee: Muhammad Kaleia

June 7, 2025 11	Loudoun United FC	1–1	Charleston Battery	Leesburg, Virginia
	Nyeman 67'	Report	Myers 43'	Stadium: Segra Field; Attendance: 1,523; Referee: Nabil Bensalah

June 14, 2025 12	Loudoun United	3–2	Detroit City FC	Leesburg, VA
6:00 PM EDT	Aboukoura 38', 45'+ 4'; Ryan 64'	Report	Morris 22'; Bryant 52'	Stadium: Segra Field; Attendance: 1,433; Referee: Abdou Ndiaye

June 20, 2025 13	Hartford Athletic	3–0	Loudoun United FC	Hartford, Connecticut
7:30 PM EDT	Mamadou 16'; Edwards 43' (pen.) 56'	Report		Stadium: Trinity Health Stadium; Attendance: 5,500; Referee: Elijio Arreguin

June 25, 2025 15	Loudoun United FC	1–4	Louisville City FC	Leesburg, Virginia
6:00 PM EDT	Aboukoura 32' (Pen.); Leerman (red card) 45'+1'	Report	Moguel 25'; McCabe 57' (o.g.); Wilson 78'; Lopez 90'+1'	Stadium: Segra Field; Attendance: 583; Referee: Joshua Encarnación

July 3, 2025 15	Loudoun United FC	0–0	Orange County SC	Leesburg, Virginia
7:00 PM EDT	Ryan (red card) 31'	Report		Stadium: Segra Field; Attendance: 3,871; Referee: Benjamin Meyer

July 13, 2025 16	Pittsburgh Riverhounds SC	2–2	Loudoun United FC	Pittsburgh, Pennsylvania
5:00 PM EDT	Williams 12' (pen.); Mertz 73'	Report	Bidois 7'; Mines 90'+2'	Stadium: Highmark Stadium; Attendance: 4,339; Referee: Elton García

July 19, 2025 17	Loudoun United FC	0–2	Oakland Roots SC	Leesburg, Virginia
7:00 PM EDT		Report	Hackshaw 22'; Wilson 27'	Stadium: Segra Field; Attendance: 2,069; Referee: Gerald Flores

August 1, 2025 18	FC Tulsa	3–2	Loudoun United FC	Tulsa, Oklahoma
8:30 PM EDT	Calheira 43'; Lukić 84'; Colli 90+5'	Report	Bidois 14'; Leerman 67'	Stadium: ONEOK Field; Attendance: 3,871; Referee: Corbyn May

August 9, 2025 19	Rhode Island FC	0–0	Loudoun United FC	Pawtucket, Rhode Island
7:00 PM EDT		Report		Stadium: Centreville Bank Stadium; Attendance: 8,514; Referee: Natalie Simon

August 16, 2025 20	Loudoun United	3–2	Indy Eleven	Leesburg, VA
7:00 PM EDT	Awuah (yellow card) 43'; Ordóñez 63', (yellow card) 74', (goal) 86'; Ryan 82'	Report	Williams (yellow card) 38'; Musa 51'; Amoh 78', (yellow card) 90+3'	Stadium: Segra Field; Attendance: 2,413; Referee: Atahan Yaya

August 25, 2025 21	Charleston Battery	4–1	Loudoun United FC	Mt. Pleasant, South Carolina
5:00 EDT	Kelly 15'; Jennings 18'; Rodriguez 53'; Myers 63'	Report	Dambrot 71'	Stadium: Patriots Point Soccer Complex; Attendance: 4,070; Referee: Elton García
Note: Match rescheduled from August 23 due to inclement weather.

August 30, 2025 22	Loudoun United FC	3–1	Miami FC	Leesburg, Virginia
7:00 PM EDT	Ricketts 6' (o.g.); Ordóñez 53'; Ryan 90'	Report	Bonfiglio 25'	Stadium: Segra Field; Attendance: 2,553; Referee: Ekaterina Koroleva

September 6, 2025 23	El Paso Locomotive FC	1−2	Loudoun United FC	El Paso, Texas
7:30 PM EDT	Ortiz 66' (red card)	Report	Mines 2'; Skundrich 11'	Stadium: Southwest University Park; Attendance: 4,720; Referee: Matthew Corrigan

September 13, 2025 24	Loudoun United FC	2−5	San Antonio FC	Leesburg, Virginia
7:00 PM EDT	Ordóñez 21'; Santos (red card); Souahy 63' (o.g.)	Report	Medranda 58'; Patino 61'; J. Hernandez 77' 90+10'; Neville 90'	Stadium: Segra Field; Attendance: 2,820; Referee: Matthew Thompson

September 20, 2025 25	Phoenix Rising FC	2–2	Loudoun United FC	Phoenix, Arizona
10:30 PM EDT	Leerman 80' (o.g.); Sainté 90'+10'	Report	Valot 9'; Mines 45'+9'	Stadium: Phoenix Rising Soccer Stadium; Attendance: 4,715; Referee: Rodrigo Albuquerque

September 28, 2025 26	Loudoun United FC	2–2	Tampa Bay Rowdies	Leesburg, Virginia
7:00 PM EDT	Aboukoura 90'+1' (pen.); Tubbs 90'+6'	Report	Arteaga 56' (pen.); Skinner 90'+8'	Stadium: Segra Field; Attendance: 2,640; Referee: Thomas Snyder

October 4, 2025 27	Loudoun United FC	0–1	Birmingham Legion FC	Leesburg, Virginia
5:00 PM EDT	Ryan (red card) 90'+4'	Report	Paterson 29' (pen.)	Stadium: Segra Field; Attendance: 2,681; Referee: Edson Carvajal

October 11, 2025 28	Detroit City FC	0–1	Loudoun United FC	Hamtramck, Michigan
4:00 PM EDT		Report	Bidois 90'+1'	Stadium: Keyworth Stadium; Attendance: 6,285; Referee: Luis Arroyo

October 18, 2025 29	Indy Eleven	2–1	Loudoun United FC	Indianapolis, Indiana
8:00 PM EDT	Rendón 11', 54'	Report	Lindley 65' (o.g.)	Stadium: IU Michael A. Carroll Track & Soccer Stadium; Attendance: 10,163; Referee: Brandon Stevis

October 25, 2025 30	Loudoun United FC	0–1	North Carolina FC	Leesburg, Virginia
5:00 PM EDT		Report	Anderson 58'	Stadium: Segra Field; Attendance: 4,204; Referee: Brad Jensen

=== 2025 USL Championship playoffs ===
Loudoun United finished the season as the sixth seed in the Eastern Conference table, enough for them to earn a spot in the USLC playoffs for the first time in franchise history. Scheduled away to play third seed North Carolina FC, Loudoun ultimately lost 1–0, ending their season.

November 1, 2025 East Quarter-Finals	North Carolina FC	1–0	Loudoun United FC	Cary, North Carolina
7:30 PM ET	Anderson 6'	Report		Stadium: First Horizon Stadium at WakeMed Soccer Park; Attendance: 2,005; Referee: Natalie Simon

=== U.S. Open Cup ===
Loudoun United played in the 110th edition of the U.S. Open Cup. Entering the tournament in the first round alongside half the teams in the USL Championship, the club was drawn as visitors against amateur club West Chester United SC of the United Soccer League of Pennsylvania. After 3–2 win after scoring three unanswered goals in a row, the club played at home against Virginia Super Soccer League club Virginia Dream FC, which they won 4–2. Loudoun were ultimately eliminated from the cup during the Third Round, losing 2–1 to fellow USL Championship club Louisville City FC.

==== Match result ====
March 18	West Chester United SC (USLPA) (Pennsylvania)	2–3	(Virginia) Loudoun United FC (USLC)	Wayne, Pennsylvania
7:30 PM EDT	Elkahloun 18' (pen.); Roby 68'	Report	Bidois 37', 61'; Sorto 49' (pen.)	Stadium: YSC Sports; Attendance: 120; Referee: Joshua Encarnación

April 2	Loudoun United FC (USLC) (Virginia)	4–2	Virginia Dream FC (VSSL)	Leesburg, Virginia
6:30 PM EDT	Bidois 42'; Mines 59'; Ryan 77', 90+2'	Report	Akinkoye 50'; Likulia 86'	Stadium: Segra Field; Referee: Marie Durr

April 15	Louisville City FC (USLC) (Kentucky)	2–1	(Virginia) Loudoun United FC (USLC)	Louisville, Kentucky
7:00 p.m. EDT	Perez 18'; Gleadle 28'	Report	Aboukoura 90'	Stadium: Lynn Family Stadium; Attendance: 2,642; Referee: Elivis Osmanovic

=== USL Cup ===
Loudoun United participated in the second edition of the USL Cup, the first edition to feature teams from both the USL Championship and League One.

==== Standings ====
Pos	Lg	Team	Pld	W	PKW	PKL	L	GF	GA	GD	Pts	Qualification
1	USLC	Loudoun United FC	4	2	1	1	0	5	3	+2	9	Advance to knockout stage
2	USL1	Charlotte Independence	4	2	1	1	0	8	4	+4	9	
3	USLC	Louisville City FC	4	3	0	0	1	8	4	+4	9	
4	USLC	Lexington SC	4	1	0	1	2	6	5	+1	4	
5	USLC	North Carolina FC	4	1	1	0	2	3	4	−1	5	

Updated to match(es) played on July 26, 2025. Source: USL

==== Group stage ====
April 26, 2025	Lexington SC	0–1	Loudoun United FC	Lexington, Kentucky
6:00 PM EDT	Adedokun (yellow card) 22'; Hafferty (yellow card) 73'	Report	McCabe (yellow card) 65'; Erlandson 90+6'	Stadium: Lexington SC Stadium; Attendance: 3,417; Referee: Alyssa Nichols

May 31, 2025	Loudoun United FC	2–1	Louisville City FC	Leesburg, Virginia
6:00 PM EDT	Aboukoura 14'; Ryan 59'	Report	Pérez 20'	Stadium: Segra Field; Referee: Thomas Snyder

June 28, 2025	Loudoun United FC	1–1 (4–3 p)	Charlotte Independence	Leesburg, Virginia
6:00 PM EDT	Aboukoura 63'	Report	Marou 73'	Stadium: Segra Field; Attendance: 1,029; Referee: Elvis Osmanovic
	Penalties
	Tingey (penalty missed); Aboukoura (penalty scored); Mines (penalty scored); Turner (penalty scored); Leerman (penalty scored)		(penalty scored) Fonseca; (penalty scored) Spielman; (penalty missed) Ngah; (penalty scored) Chaney; (penalty missed) Marou

July 25, 2025	North Carolina FC	1–1 (5–3 p)	Loudoun United FC	Cary, North Carolina
7:30 PM EDT	Perez 90+13'	Report	Bidois 36'	Stadium: First Horizon Stadium at WakeMed Soccer Park; Attendance: 1,602; Referee: John Matto
	Penalties
	Perez (penalty scored); Mentzingen (penalty scored); Maldonado (penalty scored); Dolabella (penalty scored); Conway (penalty scored)		(penalty scored) Tingey; (penalty missed) Mines; (penalty scored) Nagy; (penalty scored) Skundrich

==== Knockouts ====
August 20	Loudoun United FC	0–0 (2–4 p)	Sacramento Republic FC	Leesburg, Virginia
7:00 PM EDT		Report		Stadium: Segra Field; Attendance: 1,057; Referee: Abdou Ndiaye
	Penalties
	Tingey (penalty scored); Aboukoura (penalty missed); Ryan (penalty missed); Glasgow (penalty scored)		(penalty missed) Bennett; (penalty scored) Ross; (penalty scored) Edwards; (penalty scored) Benítez; (penalty scored) Parano

== Statistics ==
=== Top scorers ===
Rank	Position	No.	Name	USLC	US Open Cup	USL Cup	Total
1	FW	11	(Egypt) Abdellatif Aboukoura	11	1	2	14
2	FW	15	(New Zealand) Riley Bidois	4	3	1	8
2	FW	14	(United States) Zach Ryan	5	2	1	8
4	FW	9	(Guatemala) Arquímides Ordóñez	3	0	0	3
4	MF	20	(United States) Ben Mines	2	1	0	3
6	FW	7	(United States) Wesley Leggett	2	0	0	2
6	DF	3	(United States) Keegan Tingey	2	0	0	2
8	9 players with 1 goal						
Total				36	8	5	49

|}

- Last updated: September 2, 2025
- Source: Loudoun United FC Player Stats

== See also ==
- 2025 D.C. United season
