= 2026 Loudoun United FC season =

Loudoun United FC
2026 season
- Head coach: Anthony Limbrick
- Stadium: Segra Field
- USL Championship: 11th
- USLC Playoffs: DNQ
- U.S. Open Cup: Second round
- USL Cup: Group stage
- Top goalscorer: Two players (8)
- Highest home attendance: 3,080 (July 3, against Sporting Club Jacksonville)
- Lowest home attendance: 971 (March 21, against Miami FC)
- Average home league attendance: 2,771
Home colors	Away colors

The 2026 Loudoun United season was Loudoun United FC's eighth season of existence, and their eighth in the second-division of American soccer, the USL Championship.

== Club ==
=== Roster ===
As of September 10, 2026

Note: Flags indicate national team as defined under FIFA eligibility rules; some limited exceptions apply. Players may hold more than one non-FIFA nationality.

No.	Pos.	Nation	Player
2	DF	USA	Noah Adnan
4	DF	USA	Aidan O'Connor
5	DF	CAN	Salvatore Mazzaferro
6	DF	CAN	Kwame Awuah
7	MF	BDI	Pacifique Niyongabire
8	MF	USA	James Murphy
9	FW	USA	Eddy Davis III (on loan from Philadelphia Union)
10	MF	POR	Pedro Santos
11	FW	EGY	Abdellatif Aboukoura
12	DF	USA	Ezra Armstrong
13	GK	USA	Jordan Farr
16	MF	USA	Jack Panayotou (on loan from New England Revolution)
17	FW	GUY	Liam Butts (on loan from Atlanta United 2)

No.	Pos.	Nation	Player
18	MF	GEO	Giorgi Lomtadze
19	FW	USA	Richie Aman
20	MF	CAN	Sean Young
21	DF	NGR	Bolu Akinyode
22	MF	MEX	Christian Torres (on loan from Tapatío)
23	MF	USA	Akil Watts
24	DF	USA	Jacob Erlandson
28	MF	CAN	Rida Zouhir
33	DF	ITA	Luca Piras
38	DF	USA	Liam Barrus
39	FW	BRA	Marcos Dias
40	GK	USA	Ryan Conner
41	GK	USA	Ethan Bandré

Signed to first team contract with D.C. United
Signed from youth academy
Signed to 25-Day contract

=== Staff ===
As of January 24, 2025

Executive
Team President	(England) Karl Sharman
Sporting Director	(Canada) Alen Marcina
Director of Soccer Operations	(United States) Logan Angert
Technical staff
Head Coach	(Australia) Anthony Limbrick
Assistant coach	(Croatia) Dario Pot
Health and Fitness Coach	(United States) Drew Skundrich
Goalkeeping Coach	(Poland) Jack Stefanowski
Head Athletic Trainer	(United States) Connor Millina
Equipment Manager	Miguel Velasquez
Video Analyst	Alex Gent

== Competitions ==
=== USL Championship ===
==== Standings ====
Pos	Team	Pld	W	L	T	GF	GA	GD	Pts
9	Indy Eleven	30	9	14	7	35	41	−6	34
10	Birmingham Legion FC	30	6	12	12	40	46	−6	30
11	Loudoun United FC	30	6	11	13	40	46	−6	31
12	Brooklyn FC	30	5	19	6	34	63	−29	21
13	Sporting Club Jacksonville	30	3	22	5	32	78	−46	14

Updated to match(es) played on October 24, 2026. Source: USL Championship Standings
Rules for classification: 1) total wins against conference opponents; 2) goal differential against conference opponents; 3) goals scored against conference opponents; 4) head-to-head points against conference opponents; 5) points per game against conference opponents; 6) points per game against non-conference opponents; 7) fewest disciplinary points; 8) coin toss or drawing of lots

==== Match results ====
On December 16, 2025, the USL Championship released the schedule for all 25 teams for both the regular season and the USL Cup.

All times are in Eastern Time.

March 7, 2026 1	Rhode Island FC	Postponed	Loudoun United FC	Pawtucket, Rhode Island
				Stadium: Centreville Bank Stadium
Note: Postponed due to Winter Storm Impact, rescheduled for October 14.

March 14, 2026 2	Loudoun United FC	2–3	Pittsburgh Riverhounds SC	Leesburg, Virginia
3:00 PM		Report		Stadium: Segra Field; Attendance: 1,696

March 21, 2026 3	Loudoun United FC	0–0	Miami FC	Leesburg, Virginia
3:00 PM		Report		Stadium: Segra Field; Attendance: 971

March 28, 2026 4	Tampa Bay Rowdies	3–1	Loudoun United FC	St. Petersburg, Florida
7:30 PM		Report		Stadium: Pitbull Stadium; Referee: Alex Billeter

April 4, 2026 5	Loudoun United FC	2–2	Birmingham Legion FC	Leesburg, Virginia
5:00 PM		Report		Stadium: Segra Field; Attendance: 1,168; Referee: Joe Surgan

April 10, 2026 6	Loudoun United FC	3–3	Louisville City FC	Leesburg, Virginia
6:30 PM		Report		Stadium: Segra Field; Attendance: 1,287; Referee: Igor Bych

April 18, 2026 7	Hartford Athletic	0–0	Loudoun United FC	Hartford, Connecticut
7:00 PM		Report		Stadium: Trinity Health Stadium; Attendance: 2,745; Referee: Atahan Yaya

May 2, 2026 8	Loudoun United FC	2-2	Oakland Roots SC	Leesburg, Virginia
5:00 PM		Report		Stadium: Segra Field

May 9, 2026 9	Brooklyn FC	0–1	Loudoun United FC	Brooklyn, New York
7:00 PM		Report	Úlfarsson 26'	Stadium: Maimonides Park; Attendance: 1,533; Referee: John Griggs

May 23, 2026 10	Loudoun United FC	0–0	Detroit City FC	Leesburg, Virginia
6:00 PM				Stadium: Segra Field

May 30, 2026 11	Monterey Bay FC	4–1	Loudoun United FC	Seaside, California
10:00 PM	Bidois 5', 62' (pen.); Leggett 11'; Nadje 86'	Report	Ordóñez 47'	Stadium: Cardinale Stadium; Attendance: 3,346; Referee: Brandon Stevis

June 13, 2026 12	Loudoun United FC	1–4	Rhode Island FC	Leesburg, Virginia
6:00 PM	Erlandson (yellow card) 35'; Úlfarsson 58'; Ordóñez (yellow card) 67'; Akinyode (yellow card) 77'	Report	J. Williams 22'; Scardina 48'; Bacharach (yellow card) 63'; Afonso (yellow card) 68' (goal) 71'; Atkinson 89'	Stadium: Segra Field; Attendance: 1,500; Referee: Edson Carvajal

June 20, 2026 13	Birmingham Legion FC	1–1	Loudoun United FC	Birmingham, Alabama
8:00 PM	Tregarthen 89'	Report	Aboukoura 67'	Stadium: Protective Stadium; Attendance: 2,662; Referee: Alyssa Pennington

June 24, 2026 14	Charleston Battery	4–1	Loudoun United FC	Mt. Pleasant, South Carolina
7:00 PM	Foster 14'; Swan 41'; Ycaza 51' (pen.); Kelly 86'	Report	Piras 81'	Stadium: Patriots Point Soccer Complex; Attendance: 3,246; Referee: Kevin Broadley

July 3, 2026 15	Loudoun United FC	2–2	Sporting Club Jacksonville	Leesburg, Virginia
7:00 PM	Ordóñez 81'; Aboukoura 90+1'	Report	Sadlier 45+1'; Jääskeläinen 90+3'	Stadium: Segra Field; Attendance: 3,080; Referee: Mario Maric

July 18, 2026 16	Loudoun United FC	1–1	Tampa Bay Rowdies	Leesburg, Virginia
7:00 PM	Úlfarsson 82'	Report	Dolabella 21' (pen.)	Stadium: Segra Field; Attendance: 1,100; Referee: Deny Kulasinac

July 25, 2026 17	Indy Eleven	0–1	Loudoun United FC	Indianapolis, Indiana
7:00 PM		Report	Aboukoura 60'	Stadium: Carroll Stadium; Attendance: 9,234; Referee: Servando Berna Rico

August 1, 2026 18	Loudoun United FC	2–0	Hartford Athletic	Leesburg, Virginia
7:00 PM	Aboukoura 45+3'; Úlfarsson 73'	Report		Stadium: Segra Field; Attendance: 1,617; Referee: Benjamin Meyer

August 8, 2026 19	Loudoun United FC	0–1	Charleston Battery	Leesburg, Virginia
7:00 PM		Report	Blackstock 64'	Stadium: Segra Field; Attendance: 1,522; Referee: Robert Vincze

August 15, 2026 20	Detroit City FC	0–0	Loudoun United FC	Hamtramck, Michigan
7:00 PM		Report		Stadium: Keyworth Stadium; Attendance: 7,239; Referee: Muhammad Kaleia

August 22, 2026 21	Loudoun United FC	0–0	New Mexico United	Leesburg, Virginia
7:00 PM		Report	Quiah (yellow card) 10' (yellow-red card) 31'	Stadium: Segra Field; Attendance: 2,466; Referee: Erick Lezama

August 29, 2026 22	El Paso Locomotive FC	4–1	Loudoun United FC	El Paso, Texas
7:00 PM	Rubín 5', 30', 40' (pen.); Sainté 90+1'	Report	Aboukoura 17'	Stadium: Southwest University Park; Attendance: 5,808; Referee: Jorge Escobar

September 4, 2026 23	Loudoun United FC	4–5	Colorado Springs Switchbacks FC	Leesburg, Virginia
7:00 PM	Davis 38', 52', 60'; Mahoney 87' (o.g.); Murphy (yellow card) 8' (yellow-red card) 90+5'	Report	Bennett 17', 90+7' (pen.); Fjeldberg 50'; Creek 84'; Amoh 90+1'	Stadium: Segra Field; Attendance: 1,854; Referee: Joshua Encarnación

September 12, 2026 24	Pittsburgh Riverhounds SC	1–0	Loudoun United FC	Pittsburgh, Pennsylvania
7:00 PM	Bassett 8'	Report		Stadium: Highmark Stadium; Attendance: 5,150; Referee: John Griggs

September 19, 2026 25	Louisville City FC	v	Loudoun United FC	Louisville, Kentucky
7:00 PM	Serrano Lopez 38'; Donovan 45'	Report	Davis 5'	Stadium: Lynn Family Stadium; Attendance: 9,528; Referee: Nabil Bensalah

September 26, 2026 26	Sporting Club Jacksonville	1–4	Loudoun United FC	Jacksonville, Florida
7:00 PM	Kuzain 30'	Report	Davis 4', 73'; Torres 56', 58'	Stadium: Hodges Stadium; Attendance: 1,198; Referee: Cristian Campo Hernández

October 3, 2026 27	Loudoun United FC	1–1	Indy Eleven	Leesburg, Virginia
6:00 PM	Farr 90+5'	Report	Rendón 44'	Stadium: Segra Field; Attendance: 2,479; Referee: Gerald Flores

October 10, 2026 28	Miami FC	0–2	Loudoun United FC	Miami, Florida
7:00 PM		Report	Davis 85', 90+7'	Stadium: Pitbull Stadium; Referee: Jorge Escobar

October 14, 2026 1	Rhode Island FC	1–0	Loudoun United FC	Pawtucket, Rhode Island
	Scardina 3'; Tsukada (yellow card) 61' (yellow-red card) 78'	Report		Stadium: Centreville Bank Stadium; Attendance: 7,092; Referee: Alyssa Pennington
Note: Rescheduled match from March 7.

October 18, 2026 29	Birmingham Legion FC	0–0	Loudoun United FC	Birmingham, Alabama
5:00 PM		Report		Stadium: Protective Stadium; Attendance: 3,121; Referee: Stephen Foster

October 25, 2026 30	Loudoun United FC	4–3	Brooklyn FC	Leesburg, Virginia
7:00 PM	Zouhir 3'; Aboukoura 47'; Murphy 65'; Butts 88'	Report	Obregón 17', 23' (pen.); Okiyoshi 45+3'	Stadium: Segra Field; Attendance: 2,950; Referee: José Lara

=== U.S. Open Cup ===
Loudoun United played in the 111th edition of the U.S. Open Cup. Entering the tournament in the first round, the club was drawn as visitors against amateur club West Chester United SC of the United Soccer League of Pennsylvania, who Loudoun played against last year in the Open Cup.

==== Match result ====
March 17 First Round	West Chester United SC (USLPA) (Pennsylvania)	1–2	(Virginia) Loudoun United FC (USLC)	Wayne, Pennsylvania
7:30 PM EDT	Amspacher (yellow card) 68'; Robinson (yellow card) 72'; Martin 84'	Report	Dias 3'; Amoh 21'; Murphy (yellow card) 90+1'; Young (yellow card) 90+2'	Stadium: YSC Sports

April 1 Second Round	(Virginia) Richmond Kickers (USL1)	1–0	(Virginia) Loudoun United FC (USLC)	Richmond, Virginia
6:30 PM EDT	Sasankhah (yellow card) 84'; Pannholzer (yellow card) 90+3'; Dourado 90+6'; Fillion (yellow card) 90+11'	Report	Dias (yellow card) 86'	Stadium: City Stadium; Referee: Matthew Corrigan

=== USL Cup ===
Loudoun United participated in the third edition of the USL Cup, and the second edition to feature teams from both the USL Championship and League One.

==== Standings ====
Pos	Lg	Team	Pld	W	PKW	PKL	L	GF	GA	GD	Pts
2	USLC	Charleston Battery	4	2	1	1	0	8	3	+5	9
3	USLC	Pittsburgh Riverhounds SC	4	2	0	2	0	6	1	+5	8
4	USL1	Greenville Triumph SC	4	1	0	0	3	4	7	−3	3
5	USLC	Loudoun United FC	4	1	0	0	3	4	7	−3	3
6	USL1	Richmond Kickers	4	1	0	0	3	3	9	−6	3

==== Group stage ====
April 25	Loudoun United FC	1–2	Charleston Battery	Leesburg, Virginia
6:00 p.m.	Santos 27'	Report	Berry 16'; Smith 90+2'	Stadium: Segra Field; Attendance: 1,227; Referee: Deny Kulasinac

June 6, 2026	Loudoun United FC	2-0	Richmond Kickers	Leesburg, Virginia
6:00 PM				Stadium: Segra Field

June 10, 2026	Greenville Triumph SC	3-1	Loudoun United FC	Greenville, South Carolina
7:00 PM				Stadium: GE Vernova Park
Note: Originally scheduled for May 15, 2026 but the date was moved for an unspecified reason.

July 11, 2026	Pittsburgh Riverhounds SC	2–0	Loudoun United FC	Pittsburgh, Pennsylvania
5:00 PM	Amann 19' (pen.); Dikwa 66'	Report		Stadium: F.N.B. Stadium; Attendance: 5,027; Referee: Kalilou Jarju

== See also ==
- 2026 D.C. United season
