= Sergio Zárate =

Argentine footballer

Personal information
- Full name: Sergio Fabián Zárate Riga
- Date of birth: 14 October 1969 (age 57)
- Place of birth: Haedo, Argentina
- Position: Midfielder

Senior career*
Years	Team	Apps	(Gls)
1987–1990	Vélez Sarsfield	72	(13)
1991–1992	1. FC Nürnberg	42	(9)
1992–1993	Ancona	11	(2)
1993–1994	1. FC Nürnberg	27	(13)
1994	Hamburger SV	11	(1)
1995–1997	Necaxa	93	(29)
1997–1998	Club América	28	(6)
1998–1999	Necaxa	33	(10)
1999–2000	Vélez Sarsfield	8	(1)
2000–2001	Puebla	36	(6)
2002–2003	Deportivo Merlo	11	(1)
Total		372	(91)

International career
1992	Argentina	1	(0)
- * Club domestic league appearances and goals

Sergio Fabián Zárate Riga (born 14 October 1969) is an Argentine former professional footballer who played as a midfielder. He spent most of his career in the Bundesliga and the Primera División de México apart from his native Argentina.

== Club career ==
Born in Haedo, Morón Partido, Zárate started his career with Vélez Sarsfield where he spent four years in the Argentinian Primera División. He then moved to Europe where he would eventually make 80 appearances in the Bundesliga for 1. FC Nürnberg and Hamburger SV as well as a season in Italy with Ancona. In 1995 Zárate moved to Mexico where he played 190 games for Necaxa, Club América and Puebla during two stints.

== International career ==
Zárate won his only international cap for Argentina in 1992.

== Personal life ==
Sergio is the eldest of five brothers of whom four became professional footballers; Ariel played in Spain for Málaga among other teams, Rolando (also an Argentinian international) and youngest brother Mauro is a U-20 World Cup winner. Sergio works as an agent for his brothers. Sergio's nephew, Tobías, also became a professional footballer.
