= Rolando Zárate =

Argentine footballer and sports agent

Personal information
- Full name: Rolando David Zárate Riga
- Date of birth: 6 August 1978 (age 48)
- Place of birth: Haedo, Argentina
- Height: 1.82 m (6 ft 0 in)
- Position: Centre forward

Youth career
- Vélez Sarsfield

Senior career*
| Years | Team | Apps | (Gls) |
| 1997–2006 | Vélez Sarsfield | 102 | (44) |
| 1998 | → Terrassa (loan) | 2 | (0) |
| 1999–2000 | → Real Madrid B (loan) | 33 | (21) |
| 1999–2000 | → Real Madrid (loan) | 6 | (1) |
| 2001 | → Murcia (loan) | 21 | (6) |
| 2001–2002 | → Ciudad Murcia (loan) | 34 | (12) |
| 2002–2003 | → Livingston (loan) | 33 | (9) |
| 2004 | → Ittihad (loan) | 1 | (0) |
| 2006 | Tigres | 7 | (0) |
| 2007 | Monterrey | 10 | (1) |
| 2007 | River Plate | 7 | (1) |
| 2008 | Barcelona SC | 23 | (5) |
| 2009–2010 | Vélez Sarsfield | 27 | (5) |
| 2010–2011 | Huracán | 34 | (6) |
| 2011–2012 | Defensa y Justicia | 5 | (1) |
| Total | | 345 | (112) |

International career
| 2005 | Argentina | 2 | (1) |
- * Club domestic league appearances and goals

Rolando David Zárate Riga (born 6 August 1978) is an Argentine former professional footballer who played as a centre forward, and is a sports agent.

== Club career ==
Born in Haedo, Buenos Aires Province, Zárate spent most of his career for Club Atlético Vélez Sarsfield, representing the club in two different spells. He made his professional debut in 1997, playing in only 17 Primera División games in his first two seasons combined.

Zárate moved to Spain in 1998, going on to remain in that country for the following four years, always on loan: he started out at Terrassa FC in the third division, joining Real Madrid Castilla in the same level the following year. His impressive scoring form prompted Real Madrid boss Vicente del Bosque to promote him to the main squad, and he scored three official goals for them (one in La Liga and two in the Copa del Rey); between 2001 and 2002 he represented Ciudad de Murcia and its neighbours Real Murcia, respectively in divisions three and two.

Zárate played with Livingston in the 2002–03 season, still owned by Vélez. He netted twice on his debut in the Scottish Premier League, a 3–2 home win against Motherwell, and eventually proved instrumental as the Livi Lions retained their division status.

Zárate's last loan would be with Ittihad FC in Saudi Arabia. Again with Vélez, he scored 13 times in the 2004 Clausura Tournament, adding eight in the following year's Apertura. In the subsequent Clausura, Roly netted seven goals as his team won the national championship for the first time in seven years.

In the following years, Zárate played in Mexico for two teams, also representing Club Atlético River Plate without any impact. On 25 July 2009, he re-signed with Vélez on a free transfer after a period of trial, from Ecuador's Barcelona Sporting Club, but was released during that year due to injury to his spinal cord; he returned to training in early 2010 and, eventually, signed a new one-year deal.

For 2010–11, 32-year-old Zárate joined Club Atlético Huracán in the top flight, for free. At the end of the campaign, the side were tied with Gimnasia y Esgrima de La Plata for the second-to-last position in the relegation ranking, and thus needed to play a tiebreaker, losing it 2–0.

Following Huracán's relegation, Zárate's contract at the Parque Patricios ended and he signed with another club in the second division, Defensa y Justicia, again on a free transfer. After his retirement he became a football agent, representing Maximiliano Romero among others and arranging his December 2017 transfer of Romero from Vélez to PSV Eindhoven.

== International career ==
Zárate made his debut for Argentina on 9 March 2005, a friendly match with Mexico in which the former only fielded players from the domestic league. He scored in a 1–1 draw, in Los Angeles.

Also in that year, Zárate made his second and last appearance, playing 15 minutes in a 2–1 win in Bolivia for the 2006 FIFA World Cup qualifiers.

=== International goals ===
Scores and results list Argentina's goal tally first, score column indicates score after Zárate goal.

International goal scored by Rolando Zárate
| No. | Date | Venue | Opponent | Score | Result | Competition | Ref. |
|---|---|---|---|---|---|---|---|
| 1 | 9 March 2005 | Memorial Coliseum, Los Angeles, United States | Mexico | 1–0 | 1–1 | Friendly | |

== Personal life ==
Zárate has three brothers, all footballers: younger Mauro and older Sergio and Ariel, with the first two eventually representing the Argentina national team. Rolando's son, Tobías, also became a professional footballer.

== Honours ==
Vélez Sársfield

- Argentine Primera División: 1998 Clausura, 2005 Clausura

Individual

- Argentine Primera División: Top scorer 2004 Clausura (13 goals)
