= Ariel Zárate =

Argentine footballer and manager

Personal information
- Full name: Ariel Silvio Zárate Riga
- Date of birth: 13 July 1973 (age 53)
- Place of birth: Buenos Aires, Argentina
- Height: 1.74 m (5 ft 9 in)
- Position: Attacking midfielder

Youth career
- Vélez Sarsfield

Senior career*
Years	Team	Apps	(Gls)
1996	Toluca	9	(0)
1996–1997	Riccione	13	(5)
1997–1998	Cádiz	50	(13)
1998–2002	Málaga	89	(9)
2000	→ Elche (loan)	21	(6)
2002–2003	Xerez	38	(11)
2003–2005	Elche	47	(2)
2005–2006	Deportivo Morón	34	(11)
2007	Tristán Suárez	16	(3)
2007–2011	All Boys	77	(6)
Total		394	(66)

Managerial career
- 2014–2015: Deportivo Merlo
- * Club domestic league appearances and goals

Ariel Silvio Zárate Riga (born 13 July 1973) is an Argentine former professional footballer who played mainly as an attacking midfielder, and a manager.

Only having made his debut in the Primera División in his own country well past his 30s, he spent the vast majority of his professional career in Spain, mainly with Málaga which he represented in three full La Liga seasons.

== Career ==
After completing his formation at Club Atlético Vélez Sarsfield, Buenos Aires-born Zárate began playing professionally in Mexico with Club Toluca. He then had a stint with lowly A.S.D. Riccione 1929 of Italy and spent seven years in Spain, with Cádiz CF, Málaga CF (helping the Andalusia team achieve promotion to La Liga in 1999), Elche CF and Xerez CD.

Subsequently, Zárate returned to Argentina, playing for modest clubs Deportivo Morón, C.S.D. Tristán Suárez and All Boys. He helped the latter to the Primera B Metropolitana championship in his first season.

As All Boys returned to the Primera División in 2010 after an absence of nearly 40 years, Zárate made his debut in the competition in a 1–0 home loss against Racing Club de Avellaneda for the campaign's Apertura, aged 37 years and 25 days. Following his retirement, he acted as their general manager.

== Personal life ==
Zárate's son luca debuted in admiral Brown yesterday and "el chino " had three brothers, all footballers: younger Rolando and Mauro and older Sergio, with all of them eventually representing the Argentina national team. Ariel's nephew, Tobías, also became a professional footballer.
