= Woobens Pacius =

Haitian footballer (born 2001)

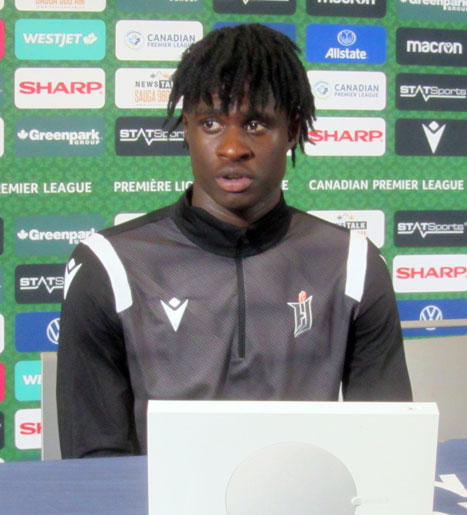
- Pacius in 2022

Personal information
- Date of birth: May 11, 2001 (age 25)
- Place of birth: Terrebonne, Quebec, Canada
- Height: 1.85 m (6 ft 1 in)
- Position: Forward

Team information
- Current team: Rouen

Youth career
- FC L'Assomption
- 2017–2021: CF Montréal

Senior career*
Years	Team	Apps	(Gls)
2021–2023	Forge FC	73	(26)
2024–2026	Nashville SC	12	(0)
2024	→ Huntsville City FC (loan)	17	(8)
2025	→ Tampa Bay Rowdies (loan)	29	(14)
2026–	Rouen	8	(1)

International career^{‡}
2025–	Haiti	1	(0)
- * Club domestic league appearances and goals as of November 7, 2026 ‡ National team caps and goals as of October 13, 2025

Woobens Pacius (born May 11, 2001) is a professional footballer who plays for Ligue 3 club Rouen. Born in Canada, he plays for the Haiti national team. Pacius formerly played for Canadian Premier League club Forge FC and Major League Soccer club Nashville SC.

== Early life ==
Pacius is a native of Terrebonne, Quebec. He played youth soccer with FC L'Assomption, later joining the Montreal Impact Academy (later known as CF Montreal Academy) in 2017. From 2018 to 2019, a series of knee injuries sidelined him for a year and a half. He was invited to the pre-season camp for the first team ahead of the 2021 season. After attending the pre-season, he was not offered a first team contract, giving him the option of either joining the CF Montreal U23 team or leaving the club.

== Club career ==
=== Forge FC ===
On August 8, 2021, Pacius signed with Canadian Premier League club Forge FC. He made his debut the same day, coming on as a substitute against Atlético Ottawa. On August 25, he scored his first and second professional goals against Atlético Ottawa in a 4–0 victory. During his debut season, Pacius won multiple man of the match awards. Forge advanced to the CPL final, but were defeated by Pacific FC.

Remaining with Forge in 2022, he continued his goal-scoring prowess, with a streak of seven goals in six games, including a hat trick on July 19 against FC Edmonton and being named CPL Player of the Month for July. On August 6, 2022, he scored the fastest goal in Forge's history with a second-minute goal against HFX Wanderers FC. He led Forge in scoring with ten regular season goals in 2022, finishing fourth in the overall league scoring race. He scored in both legs of the playoff semi-finals against Cavalry FC, helping Forge reach the championship match, where they won the championship. At the end of the 2022 season, he was nominated for the CPL U21 Player of the Year award. He finished as the club's top scorer in 2022 with 13 goals across all competitions, including a stretch of seven goals in six games.

Forge subsequently picked up Pacius' club option for the 2023 season. On September 3, 2023, he scored a hat-trick in a 3–0 victory over Vancouver FC. In October 2023, despite missing out on the CPL play-off final due to an injury, he was a part of the Forge squad that won their fourth league title, following a 2–1 win over Cavalry FC. In December, Pacius announced that he was leaving the club after two and a half seasons, upon the expiry of his contract. Over his time with Forge, he scored 32 goals in 93 appearances, across all competitions.

=== Nashville SC ===
On February 15, 2024, Pacius signed as a free agent with Major League Soccer club Nashville SC on a two-year contract, with options for the 2026 and 2027 seasons. He made his debut with the second team, Huntsville City FC, in MLS Next Pro on June 8, scoring his first goal. On September 15, 2024, he scored a hat trick for Huntsville in a 6–3 victory over Atlanta United 2. The performance earned him MLS Next Pro Player of the Matchweek honours.

==== Loan to Tampa Bay Rowdies ====
In January 2025, Pacius was loaned to the Tampa Bay Rowdies in the USL Championship for the 2025 season.

=== Rouen ===
On 17 August 2026, Pacius transferred to Ligue 3 club Rouen for an undisclosed fee. Nashville SC retained a sell-on percentage as part of the deal.

== International career ==
Born in Canada, Pacius is of Haitian descent. In 2016, he was invited to an identification camp for the Canada U15 team.

In October 2024, Pacius announced that he was interested in representing Haiti at international level. He received his first call-up to the Haiti senior team for their 2026 FIFA World Cup qualification matches in October 2025.

== Personal life ==
In November 2023, Pacius became a Brand Ambassador for World Vision Canada.

== Career statistics ==
=== Club ===
As of match played 24 February 2025

Appearances and goals by club, season and competition
Club	Season	League			National cup (Note: Includes Canadian Championship, U.S. Open Cup)		Continental		Other		Total	
Club	Season	Division	Apps	Goals	Apps	Goals	Apps	Goals	Apps	Goals	Apps	Goals
Forge FC	2021	Canadian Premier League	18	6	1	1	6 (Note: Appearances in CONCACAF League)	0	2 (Note: Appearances in Canadian Premier League play-offs)	1	27	8
Forge FC	2022	Canadian Premier League	27	10	3 (Note: Includes one appearance in 2020 Canadian Championship, which was delayed to 2022 because of the COVID-19 pandemic)	1	2 (Note: Appearances in CONCACAF Champions League)	0	2	2	34	13
Forge FC	2023	Canadian Premier League	28	10	3	1	—		0	0	31	11
Forge FC	Total		73	26	7	3	8	0	4	3	92	32
Nashville SC	2024	Major League Soccer	0	0	—		—		—		0	0
Nashville SC	2026	Major League Soccer	7	0	0	0	3 (Note: Appearances in CONCACAF Champions Cup)	2	—		10	2
Nashville SC	Total		7	0	0	0	3	2	—		10	2
Huntsville City FC (loan)	2024	MLS Next Pro	17	8	—		—		—		17	8
Tampa Bay Rowdies (loan)	2025	USL Championship	29	14	2	0	—		4 (Note: Appearances in USL Cup)	3	35	17
Career total			126	48	9	3	11	2	8	6	154	59

=== International ===
As of match played 13 October 2025

Appearances and goals by national team and year
National team	Year	Apps	Goals
Haiti	2025	1	0
Total		1	0
