= Kevin Hoyos =

American soccer player (born 1993)

Personal information
- Full name: Kevin John Hoyos Manzur
- Date of birth: 25 February 1993 (age 33)
- Place of birth: Fountain Valley, California, U.S.
- Height: 1.80 m (5 ft 11 in)
- Positions: Midfielder; forward

Team information
- Current team: Miami FC
- Number: 29

Youth career
- 2007–2012: Estudiantes LP

Senior career*
Years	Team	Apps	(Gls)
2012–2015	Estudiantes LP	0	(0)
2013	→ CD Victoria (loan)	15	(7)
2014	→ Tristán Suárez (loan)	6	(2)
2015	→ Villa San Carlos (loan)	29	(3)
2016	Fénix	1	(0)
2016	Unión Villa Krause	1	(0)
2017	Vida		
2017–2019	Parrillas One		
2020	San Miguel	5	(1)
2021	Marathón	12	(4)
2022–2023	América de Quito	44	(11)
2025–2026	Miami FC	9	(2)
- * Club domestic league appearances and goals as of 23:13, 26 October 2025 (UTC)

Kevin John Hoyos Manzur (born 25 February 1993) is an American professional soccer player who plays as a midfielder.

== Career ==
Kevin Hoyos was born in Fountain Valley, California. He is son of Argentine parents and brother of the also footballer Michael Hoyos. In 2006, he and his brother began to play with a youth club in their hometown in the U.S., the Irvine Strikers. After three years with the Strikers, both Hoyos brothers moved to West Coast FC, where they spent two years before transferring to Estudiantes de La Plata, the club with which both debuted professionally. After three and a half years with Estudiantes, Kevin left the club in July 2013 and joined C.D. Victoria in Honduras.

== Personal ==
His parents were from Don Torcuato in Buenos Aires province. Hoyos, who holds dual USA-Argentine citizenship, is the third USA player to play in the Argentine top league, after Renato Corsi, who played for Argentinos Juniors and other teams in the 1980s, and Bryan Gerzicich, who played for Arsenal in 2006. His older brother, Michael, is also American and currently plays for OFI in the Super League Greece.
