= Cristian Vázquez =

Argentine professional footballer

Personal information
- Full name: Cristian Matías Vázquez
- Date of birth: 11 November 1998 (age 27)
- Place of birth: Buenos Aires, Argentina
- Height: 1.70 m (5 ft 7 in)
- Position: Midfielder

Team information
- Current team: Miami FC
- Number: 30

Youth career
- Deportivo Español

Senior career*
Years	Team	Apps	(Gls)
2017–2023	Deportivo Español	32	(0)
2024	Vinotinto	7	(1)
2025–	Miami FC	27	(0)
- * Club domestic league appearances and goals as of 23:07, 26 October 2025 (UTC)

Cristian Matías Vázquez (born 11 November 1998) is an Argentine professional footballer who plays as a midfielder for Miami FC.

== Career ==
Vázquez's career got underway in Primera B Metropolitana with Deportivo Español. He made his professional debut in June 2017 during a 2–0 victory over Barracas Central, in what was his sole appearance in the 2016–17 season. Four appearances followed in 2017–18, prior to the midfielder appearing twenty-seven times in 2018–19 as they were relegated to Primera C Metropolitana.

== Career statistics ==
As of 28 May 2019.

Appearances and goals by club, season and competition
Club	Season	League			Cup		League Cup		Continental		Other		Total	
Club	Season	Division	Apps	Goals	Apps	Goals	Apps	Goals	Apps	Goals	Apps	Goals	Apps	Goals
Deportivo Español	2016–17	Primera B Metropolitana	1	0	0	0	—		—		0	0	1	0
Deportivo Español	2017–18	Primera B Metropolitana	4	0	0	0	—		—		0	0	4	0
Deportivo Español	2018–19	Primera B Metropolitana	27	0	0	0	—		—		0	0	27	0
Career total			32	0	0	0	—		—		0	0	32	0
