= Sebastián Blanco =

Argentine footballer

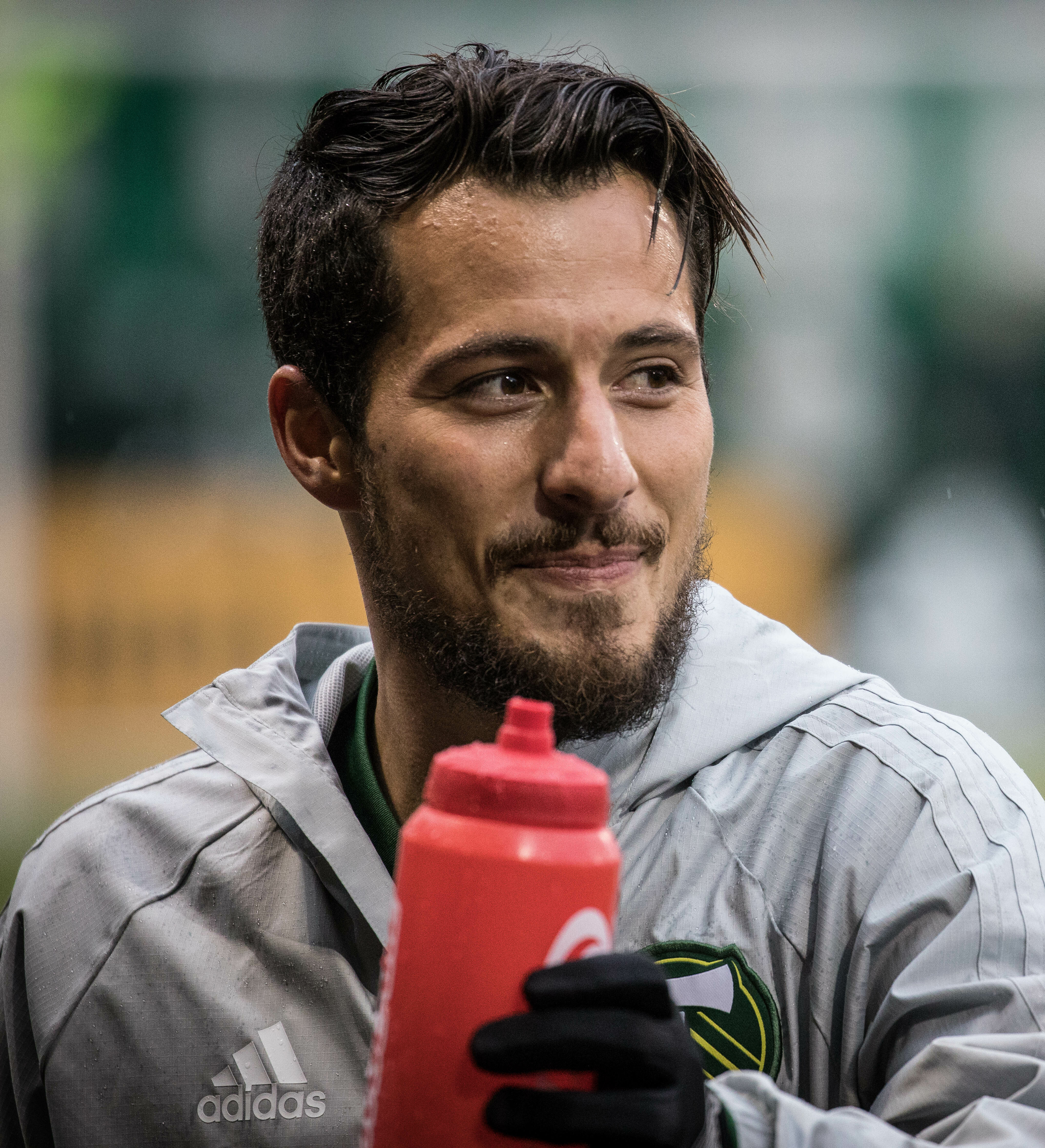
- Blanco with the Portland Timbers in 2018

Personal information
- Full name: Sebastián Marcelo Blanco
- Date of birth: 15 March 1988 (age 38)
- Place of birth: Lomas de Zamora, Buenos Aires, Argentina
- Height: 1.68 m (5 ft 6 in)
- Position: Attacking midfielder

Team information
- Current team: Real Pilar
- Number: 10

Youth career
- Lanús

Senior career*
Years	Team	Apps	(Gls)
2006–2011	Lanús	128	(19)
2011–2014	Metalist Kharkiv	68	(10)
2014–2015	West Bromwich Albion	3	(0)
2015	→ San Lorenzo (loan)	15	(1)
2015–2017	San Lorenzo	40	(8)
2017–2023	Portland Timbers	159	(40)
2024–2025	San Lorenzo	8	(1)
2025–2026	Miami FC	23	(1)
2026–	Real Pilar	2	(0)

International career
2009–2010	Argentina	2	(1)
- * Club domestic league appearances and goals as of 17:11, 13 March 2026 (UTC)

Sebastián Marcelo Blanco (born 15 March 1988) is an Argentine professional footballer for Primera B Metropolitana club Real Pilar.

== Club career ==
=== Lanús ===
Blanco made his breakthrough into the Lanús first team in 2006. In 2007, he was part of the squad that won the 2007 Apertura championship, the first top flight league title in the club's history.

=== West Brom ===
On 30 August 2014, Blanco signed a two-year contract with the option of a third year with Premier League side West Bromwich Albion F.C.

=== San Lorenzo ===
Blanco signed with the Argentine team San Lorenzo de Almagro for the 2016–17 season and went on to play 853 minutes for the side.

=== Portland Timbers ===
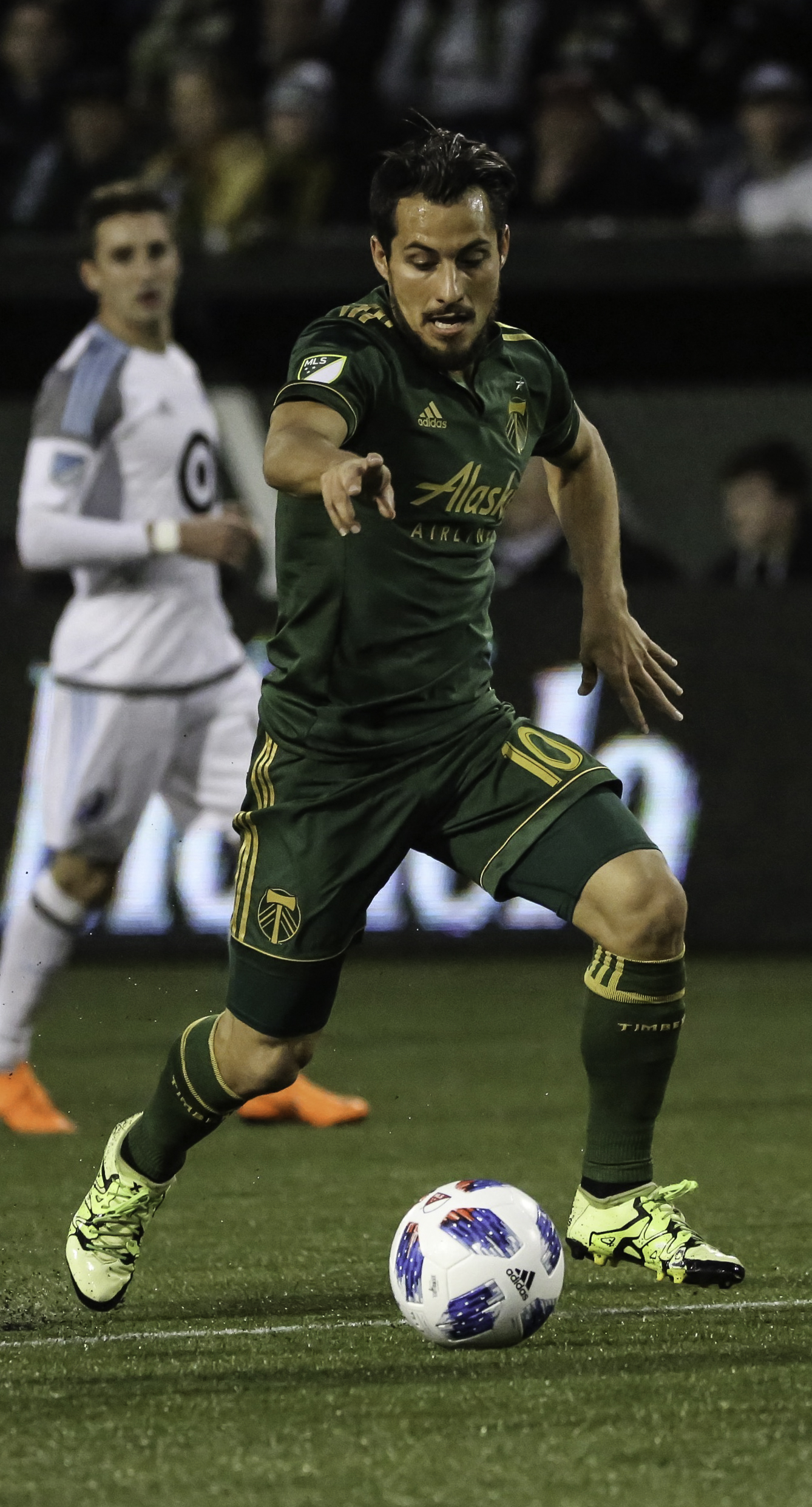
Blanco Playing for the Portland Timbers

On 2 February 2017 Blanco was transferred from San Lorenzo to the Portland Timbers of Major League Soccer. Blanco was signed as a Designated Player. On 11 September 2018, Blanco was named MLS Player of the Week for Week 28 of the 2018 season after scoring a brace in a 2–0 victory over the Colorado Rapids. On 10 October 2018, Blanco received a second Player of the Week award of the season after scoring two goals and an assist in Portland's 4–1 win over Real Salt Lake. Blanco signed a multi-year extension to his Designated Player contract on 29 October 2019. On 13 August 2020, Blanco was named MLS is Back Player of the Tournament for his contributions towards the Timbers' victory. Blanco was one of the Timbers best players in the 2021 season, as evidences by the teams' 14-6-4(1.9 ppg) record with him, and a 3-7-0(0.9 ppg) record without him. On 16 May 2022, Blanco was awarded MLS Player of the Week for Week 11 of the 2022 season in recognition of his performance in a 7–2 win over Sporting Kansas City in which he notched two goals and two assists.

=== Miami FC ===
On 31 January 2025, Blanco signed with USL Championship club Miami FC for the 2025 season. He made his debut for the club on 8 March in an 0–2 loss against Detroit City FC. He scored his first league goal on 7 June, in a 1–0 victory over Rhode Island FC.

== International career ==
Born in Argentina, Blanco is of Spanish descent and holds dual-citizenship. On 20 May 2009, Blanco made his debut for the Argentina national team in a friendly match against Panama, coming on as a second-half substitute.

== Career statistics ==
=== Club ===
As of 24 May 2024

Appearances and goals by club, season and competition
Club	Season	League			Cup		Continental		Other		Total	
Club	Season	Division	Apps	Goals	Apps	Goals	Apps	Goals	Apps	Goals	Apps	Goals
Lanús	2005–06	Argentine Primera División	1	0	—		—		—		1	0
Lanús	2006–07	Argentine Primera División	6	1	—		—		—		6	1
Lanús	2007–08	Argentine Primera División	24	3	—		—		—		24	3
Lanús	2008–09	Argentine Primera División	35	5	—		5 (Note: Appearance(s) in Copa Libertadores)	0	—		40	5
Lanús	2009–10	Argentine Primera División	34	7	—		10 (Note: Four appearances in Copa Sudamericana, Six appearances in Copa Libertadores)	1 (Note: One goal in Copa Libertadores)	—		44	8
Lanús	2010–11	Argentine Primera División	14	1	—		—		—		14	1
Lanús	Total		114	17	—		15	1	—		129	18
Metalist Kharkiv	2010–11	Ukrainian Premier League	0	0	—		2 (Note: Appearance(s) in UEFA Europa League)	0	—		2	0
Metalist Kharkiv	2011–12	Ukrainian Premier League	15	2	2	0	10	1	—		27	3
Metalist Kharkiv	2012–13	Ukrainian Premier League	26	2	2	0	8	1	—		36	3
Metalist Kharkiv	2013–14	Ukrainian Premier League	27	6	3	1	2 (Note: Appearance(s) in UEFA Champions League)	1	—		32	8
Metalist Kharkiv	Total		68	10	7	1	22	3	—		97	14
West Bromwich Albion	2014–15	Premier League	3	0	—		—		2 (Note: Appearance(s) in Football League Cup)	0	5	0
San Lorenzo (loan)	2015	Argentine Primera División	15	1	—		5	0	—		20	1
San Lorenzo	2015	Argentine Primera División	14	3	3	0	2 (Note: Appearance(s) in CONMEBOL Recopa)	0	—		19	3
San Lorenzo	2016	Argentine Primera División	15	2	4	2	12 (Note: Eight appearances in Copa Sudamericana, Four appearances in Copa Libertadores)	0	2 (Note: One appearance in Supercopa Argentina, One appearance in Torneos de Verano)	0	33	4
San Lorenzo	2016–17	Argentine Primera División	11	3	0	0	—		1 (Note: Appearance(s) in Torneos de Verano)	0	12	3
San Lorenzo	Total		40	8	7	2	14	0	3	0	64	10
Portland Timbers	2017	MLS	33	8	—		—		1 (Note: Appearance(s) in MLS Cup Playoffs)	0	34	8
Portland Timbers	2018	MLS	31	10	2	1	—		6	3	39	14
Portland Timbers	2019	MLS	30	6	4	1	—		1	0	35	7
Portland Timbers	2020	MLS	9	2	—		—		4 (Note: Appearance(s) in MLS is Back Tournament)	2	13	4
Portland Timbers	2021	MLS	24	7	—		0	0	3	2	27	9
Portland Timbers	2022	MLS	32	7	1	0	3 (Note: Appearance(s) in Leagues Cup)	0	—		36	7
Portland Timbers	2023	MLS	17	1	2	1	—		—		19	2
Portland Timbers	Total		176	41	9	3	3	0	15	7	203	51
San Lorenzo	2024	Argentine Primera División	2	0	—		0	0	—		2	0
Miami FC	2025	USL Championship	9	1	4 (Note: 2 appearances in USL Cup, 2 appearances in U.S. Open Cup)	1 (Note: One goal in USL Cup)	—		0	0	13	2
Career Total			427	78	27	7	59	4	20	7	533	96

=== International ===
Appearances and goals by national team and year
National team	Year	Apps	Goals
Argentina	2009	1	0
Argentina	2010	1	1
Total		2	1

Scores and results list Argentina's goal tally first. The score column indicates the score after each Blanco goal.

List of international goals scored by Sebastián Blanco
No.	Date	Venue	Opponent	Score	Result	Competition	Ref.
1	6 May 2010	Estadio Antonio Vespucio Liberti, Buenos Aires, Argentina	Haiti	3-0	4-0	Friendly	

== Honours ==
Lanús

- Argentine Primera División: 2007 Apertura

San Lorenzo

- Supercopa Argentina: 2015

Portland Timbers

- MLS is Back Tournament: 2020

Individual

- MLS is Back Tournament Player of the Tournament: 2020
