= Ethan Bandré =

American soccer player (born 1998)

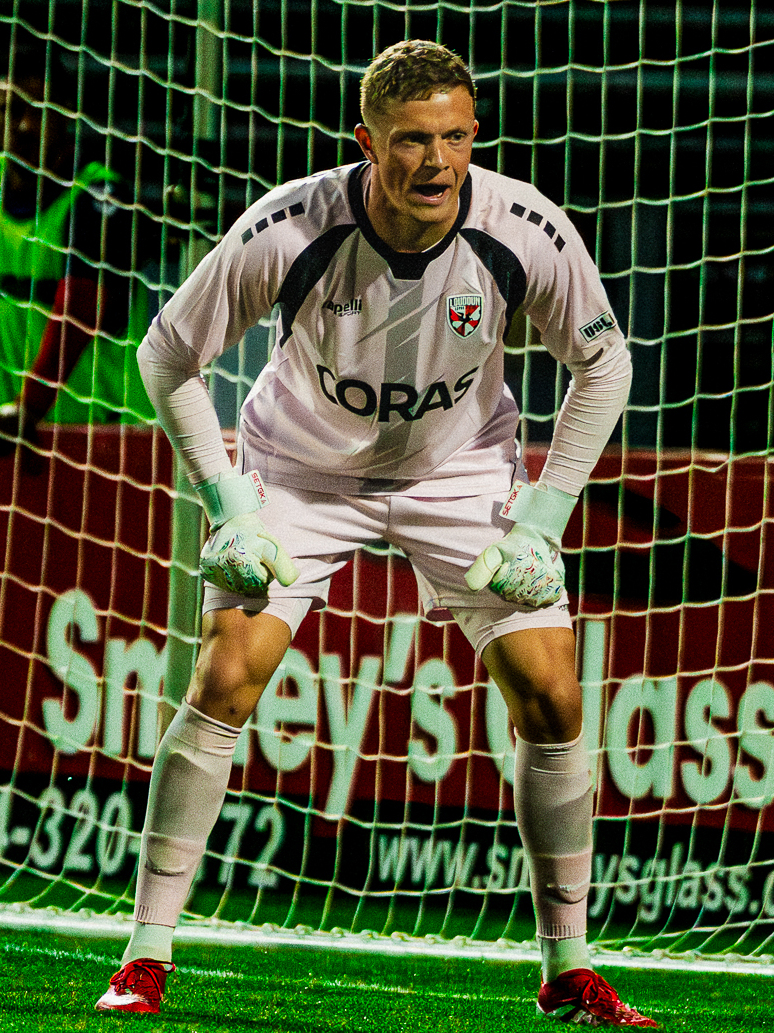
- Bandre with Loudoun United FC in 2026

Personal information
- Full name: Ethan Bandré
- Date of birth: September 14, 1998 (age 28)
- Place of birth: Salina, Kansas, United States
- Height: 1.88 m (6 ft 2 in)
- Position: Goalkeeper

Team information
- Current team: Loudoun United
- Number: 41

Youth career
- Kansas Rush

College career
Years	Team	Apps	(Gls)
2017–2019	Pacific Tigers	23	(0)
2020–2021	Northwestern Wildcats	10	(0)

Senior career*
Years	Team	Apps	(Gls)
2018–2019	Kaw Valley FC	4	(0)
2021	Des Moines Menace	2	(0)
2022–2023	Sporting Kansas City II	5	(0)
2024	Colorado Rapids 2	13	(0)
2024	Colorado Rapids	0	(0)
2025	Tampa Bay Rowdies	13	(0)
2026–	Loudoun United	19	(0)
- * Club domestic league appearances and goals as of November 7, 2026

Ethan Bandré (born September 14, 1998) is an American soccer player who plays as a goalkeeper for USL Championship side Loudoun United FC.

== Career ==
=== Youth ===
Bandré attended Salina High School South, winning the 5A state championship in 2015, was named a three time KHSSCA first team all-state honoree as well as a two time state goalkeeper of the year and league MVP in 2016. He also played club soccer for Kansas Rush Academy, who he helped win two club state championships.

=== College and amateur ===
In 2017, Bandré attended University of the Pacific to play college soccer. He did not play in his first year, but went on to make 23 appearances for the Tigers and was named WCC All-Academic First Team in 2019, before transferring to Northwestern University in 2020, where he competed in a further ten games.

While at college, Bandré competed in the USL League Two with Kaw Valley FC. In 2018, he made four appearances, and in 2019 made a single playoff appearance. 2021 saw him play again in the USL League Two, this time with Des Moines Menace, making four regular season appearances and five playoff appearances, helping the team to win the USL League Two Championship.

=== Senior ===
On February 18, 2023, Bandré signed his first professional contract with MLS Next Pro side Sporting Kansas City II. He made five appearances in the 2022 season. Following the 2022 season, it was announced Kansas City had exercised their contract option with Bandré to keep him at the club for another season.

On February 7, 2024, Bandré signed with MLS Next Pro club Colorado Rapids 2. He permanently moved up to the club's Major League Soccer roster on April 26, 2024. Bandré's contract option was declined by Colorado following their 2024 season.

On February 21, 2025, Bandré joined USL Championship side Tampa Bay Rowdies.

On January 23, 2026, Loudoun United announced they had signed Bandré to a two-year contract through the 2027 USL Championship season.

== Honors ==
=== Club ===
Des Moines Menace

- USL League Two: 2021
