= Francesco Celeste =

Argentine association football player

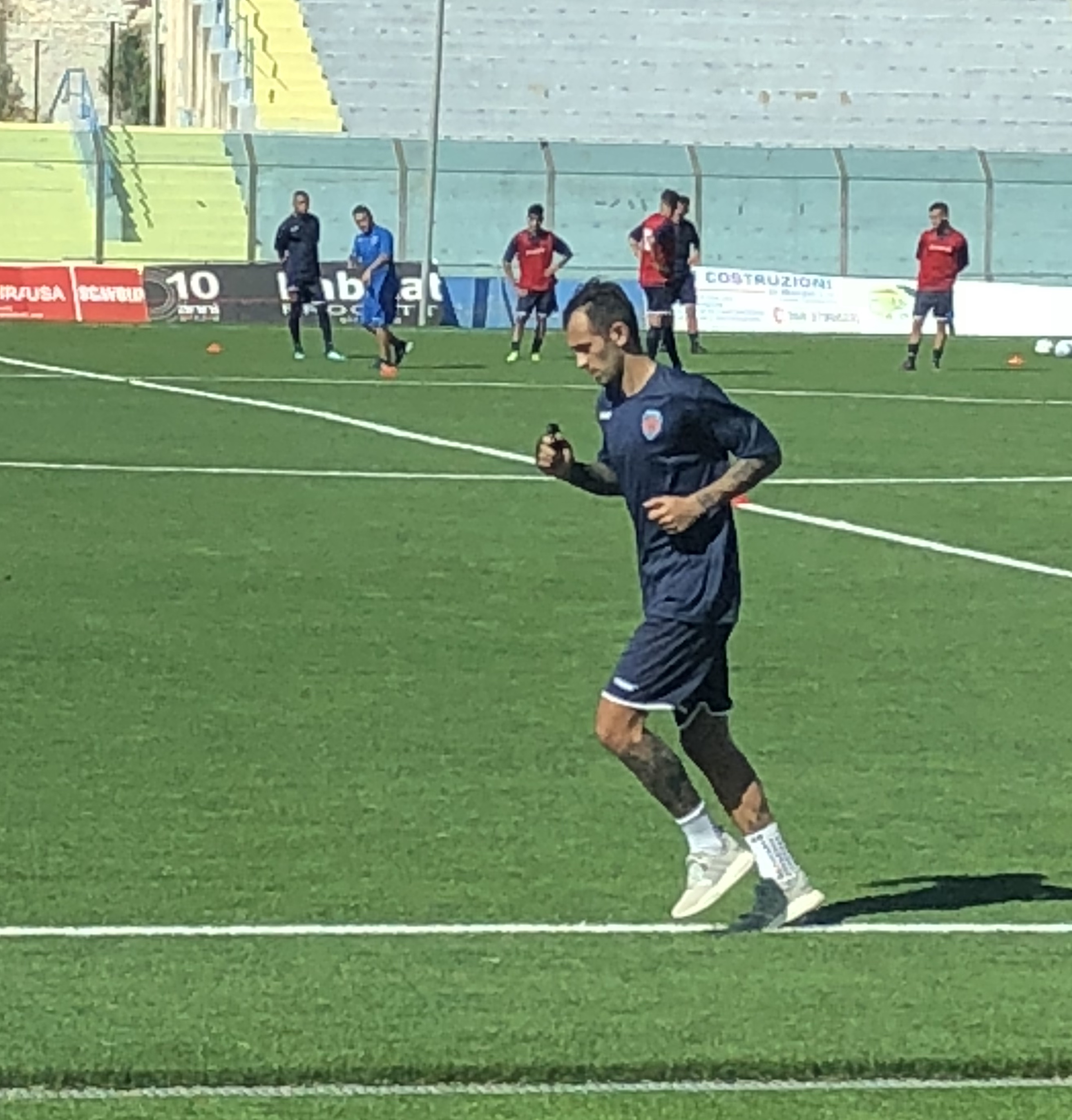
- Francesco Celeste

Personal information
- Full name: Francesco Daniel Celeste
- Date of birth: 3 May 1994 (age 32)
- Place of birth: Vicente López, Argentina
- Height: 1.75 m (5 ft 9 in)
- Position: Midfielder

Team information
- Current team: Miami FC
- Number: 22

Youth career
- –2013: Boca Juniors

Senior career*
Years	Team	Apps	(Gls)
2013–2016	Boca Juniors	2	(0)
2015–2016	→ Freamunde (loan)	39	(2)
2016–2017	Quilmes	6	(0)
2018	Potros	6	(0)
2018	Siracusa	9	(0)
2020	Cartaginés	3	(0)
2020	Nueva Chicago	1	(0)
2021	Fénix de Pilar	16	(0)
2022–2023	Los Andes	25	(3)
2023–2024	Beroe	10	(1)
2024	Zamora	0	(0)
2025–	Miami FC	16	(0)
- * Club domestic league appearances and goals as of 23:06, 26 October 2025 (UTC)

Francesco Daniel Celeste (born 3 May 1994) is an Argentine professional footballer who plays as a midfielder for USL Championship club Miami FC.

== Career ==
Celeste started his career at Boca Juniors and had a spell on trial at Scottish club Rangers in 2012. He returned to Boca and made his professional debut with them on 1 December 2013, coming on as a substitute and playing the final 27 minutes in a 2–2 draw with Lanús in the Argentine Primera División. He joined LigaPro side Freamunde on loan for the 2015–16 season before returning to Argentina to join Quilmes and then later joined Mexican side Potros. On 29 August 2018, Celeste joined Serie C side Siracusa. On 1 August 2023, he was announced as a new signing of Bulgarian team Beroe.
