= Tobías Zárate =

Argentine footballer (born 2000)

Personal information
- Full name: Tobías Joel Zárate
- Date of birth: 7 July 2000 (age 26)
- Place of birth: Haedo, Argentina
- Height: 1.78 m (5 ft 10 in)
- Position: Forward

Team information
- Current team: Almirante Brown

Youth career
- Vélez Sarsfield

Senior career*
Years	Team	Apps	(Gls)
2020–2023	Vélez Sarsfield	3	(0)
2020–2021	→ Famalicão (loan)	0	(0)
2021	→ Deportivo Morón (loan)	32	(9)
2022	→ Coquimbo Unido (loan)	5	(0)
2022	→ Deportivo Morón (loan)	14	(1)
2023	→ Arsenal de Sarandí (loan)	6	(0)
2023–2024	AEL	1	(0)
2025	Miami FC	22	(3)
2026–	Almirante Brown	0	(0)
- * Club domestic league appearances and goals as of 23:05, 26 October 2025 (UTC)

Tobías Joel Zárate (born 7 July 2000) is an Argentine professional footballer who plays as a forward for Primera B Nacional club Almirante Brown.

== Career ==
Zárate joined the youth system of Vélez Sarsfield at the age of seven. He scored over fifty goals for their academy. Zárate was promoted to their first-team squad for the start of 2020 under manager Gabriel Heinze, initially appearing as an unused substitute for Primera División matches with Gimnasia y Esgrima and Aldosivi towards the end of January. He made his senior debut on 4 February during a Copa Sudamericana first stage first leg encounter with Ecuador's Aucas, after replacing Lucas Robertone with eighteen minutes left. Zárate again featured off the bench in the second leg two weeks later. On 5 October 2020, Zárate was announced as a loan signing by Primeira Liga side Famalicão; initially penning terms until December 2021, having also extended his Vélez contract until June 2023. He would only feature for the Portuguese club's U23s in Liga Revelação. He made his reserve debut on 12 November against Leixões, before scoring twice in a 2–2 draw away to Académica on 5 December; his last league appearance came on 15 January 2021 versus Belenenses SAD. Zárate returned to Vélez Sarsfield in February, before departing on loan to Primera Nacional with Deportivo Morón on 11 March.

After a short term loaned at Coquimbo Unido in the Chilean Primera División, he returned to Deportivo Morón in June 2022.

In 2023, he joined Arsenal de Sarandí on loan until December.

In January 2026, Zárate returned to his homeland and joined Almirante Brown.

== Personal life ==
Zárate is the son of former footballer Rolando Zárate. He is also the nephew of footballers Mauro, Sergio and Ariel.

From his paternal line, he is of Chilean descent due to the fact that his grandfather, Juvenal, was born in Chuquicamata, Chile.

== Career statistics ==
As of 12 March 2021.

Appearances and goals by club, season and competition
Club	Season	League			National cup		League cup		Continental		Other		Total	
Club	Season	Division	Apps	Goals	Apps	Goals	Apps	Goals	Apps	Goals	Apps	Goals	Apps	Goals
Vélez Sarsfield	2019–20	Primera División	3	0	0	0	1	0	2 (Note: Appearance(s) in the Copa Sudamericana)	0	0	0	6	0
Vélez Sarsfield	2020–21 (Note: Soccerway counts 2020 Copa de la Liga Profesional appearances as league appearances.)	Primera División	0	0	0	0	0	0	0	0	0	0	0	0
Vélez Sarsfield	2021 (Note: Soccerway counts 2021 Copa de la Liga Profesional appearances as league appearances.)	Primera División	0	0	0	0	—		0	0	0	0	0	0
Vélez Sarsfield	Total		3	0	0	0	0	0	2	0	0	0	5	0
Famalicão (loan)	2020–21	Primeira Liga	0	0	0	0	—		—		0	0	0	0
Deportivo Morón (loan)	2021	Primera Nacional	0	0	0	0	—		—		0	0	0	0
Career total			3	0	0	0	1	0	2	0	0	0	6	0
