= Abdellatif Aboukoura =

American soccer player (born 2004)

Personal information
- Date of birth: October 16, 2004 (age 22)
- Place of birth: Fairfax, Virginia, U.S.
- Position: Forward

Team information
- Current team: Loudoun United
- Number: 11

Youth career
- 2016–2021: D.C. United

Senior career*
Years	Team	Apps	(Gls)
2021–	Loudoun United	93	(27)
- * Club domestic league appearances and goals as of October 31, 2026

Abdellatif Aboukoura (Arabic: عبداللطيف ابو قورة; born October 16, 2004) is an American professional soccer player who plays for Loudoun United FC in the USL Championship.

== Club career ==
On May 16, 2021, Aboukoura made his professional debut at age 16 for Loudoun United.

On April 16, 2022, Aboukoura scored his first professional goal for Loudoun United, in a 4–1 away loss to Oakland Roots. Aboukoura scored subsequent goals for United in matches against Phoenix Rising and New York Red Bulls II.

In August 2024, Aboukoura signed a two and a half year contract with an option for 2027 with Loudoun United. During the 2025 season, Aboukoura earned multiple honors, being the team's leading scorer (and the eighth-highest scorer across the entire USLC) with 12 goals. For his efforts, he was awarded the USL Championship Young Player of the Year and USL Championship All-League Second Team.

== International career ==
Aboukoura is eligible to represent both the United States and Egypt at international level. Born in Fairfax, Virginia, to Egyptian parents, Aboukoura was called into a United States under-17 training camp in 2021, but didn't join due to injury. In March 2022, Aboukoura trained with the Egyptian under-20 national team, ahead of their friendly against Slovenia. Aboukoura was again selected for the Egyptian U-20 squad in July 2022, joining the team for the 2022 Arab Cup U-20.

== Statistics ==
As of match played November 2, 2025

Appearances and goals by club, season and competition
Club	Season	League			National cup		Continental		Total	
Club	Season	Division	Apps	Goals	Apps	Goals	Apps	Goals	Apps	Goals
Loudoun United	2021	USL Championship	9	0	—		—		9	0
Loudoun United	2022	USL Championship	7	4	—		—		7	4
Loudoun United	2024	USL Championship	25	5	3	0	—		28	5
Loudoun United	2025	USL Championship	25	12	3	1	—		28	13
Career total			66	21	6	1	0	0	72	22

== Honors ==
- USL Championship Young Player of the Year Award: 2025
- USL Championship All-League Second Team: 2025
