= Diego Mercado =

Argentine footballer

Personal information
- Full name: Diego Alan Mercado Carrizo
- Date of birth: 3 January 1997 (age 29)
- Place of birth: Ituzaingó, Argentina
- Height: 1.69 m (5 ft 6 1/2 in)
- Position: Midfielder

Team information
- Current team: San Martín SJ

Youth career
- Boca Juniors
- Huracán

Senior career*
Years	Team	Apps	(Gls)
2017–2020	Independiente	4	(0)
2020–2023	Huracán	16	(0)
2023–2024	Nueva Chicago	31	(0)
2024	Trinidense	4	(0)
2024–2025	Ferro Carril Oeste	9	(0)
2025–2026	Miami FC	25	(0)
2026–	San Martín SJ	4	(0)
- * Club domestic league appearances and goals as of 18:56, 19 March 2026 (UTC)

Diego Alan Mercado Carrizo (born 3 January 1997) is an Argentine professional footballer who plays as a midfielder for Primera Nacional club San Martín SJ.

== Career ==
Mercado began his senior career with Independiente, having joined their youth system from Boca Juniors. He was an unused substitute on two occasions during the 2017–18 Argentine Primera División season under manager Ariel Holan, prior to making his professional debut in the following campaign against Huracán on 21 October 2018; Holan subbed him on for the final seconds of a 3–1 victory.

Mercado joined USL Championship club Miami FC on 6 February 2025.

== Career statistics ==
As of 28 October 2024.

Club statistics
Club	Division	League			Cup		Continental		Total	
Club	Division	Season	Apps	Goals	Apps	Goals	Apps	Goals	Apps	Goals
Independiente	Argentine Primera División	2018-19	0	0	0	0	0	0	0	0
Independiente	Argentine Primera División	2019-20	3	0	1	0	0	0	4	0
Independiente	Total		3	0	1	0	0	0	4	0
Huracán	Argentine Primera División	2020-21	1	0	0	0	—		1	0
Huracán	Argentine Primera División	2021	11	0	0	0	—		11	0
Huracán	Argentine Primera División	2022	5	0	0	0	—		5	0
Huracán	Total		17	0	0	0	0	0	17	0
Nueva Chicago	Primera B Nacional	2023	31	0	0	0	—		31	0
Trinidense	Paraguayan Primera División	2024	4	0	0	0	2	0	6	0
Ferro Carril Oeste	Primera B Nacional	2024	9	0	0	0	—		9	0
Career total			64	0	1	0	2	0	67	0
