= Haedo, Argentina =

Haedo
- City
- Location in Greater Buenos Aires
- Coordinates: 34°39′S 58°36′W
- Country: Argentina
- Province: Buenos Aires
- Partido: Morón
- Founded: 11 November 1886
- Elevation: 27 m (89 ft)

Population (2001 census [INDEC])
  - Total: 38,068
  - Density: 6,230.44/km^{2} (16,136.8/sq mi)
- CPA Base: B 1706
- Area code: +54 11

Haedo is a city located in Morón Partido, Buenos Aires Province, Argentina. It forms part of the urban conurbation of Greater Buenos Aires.

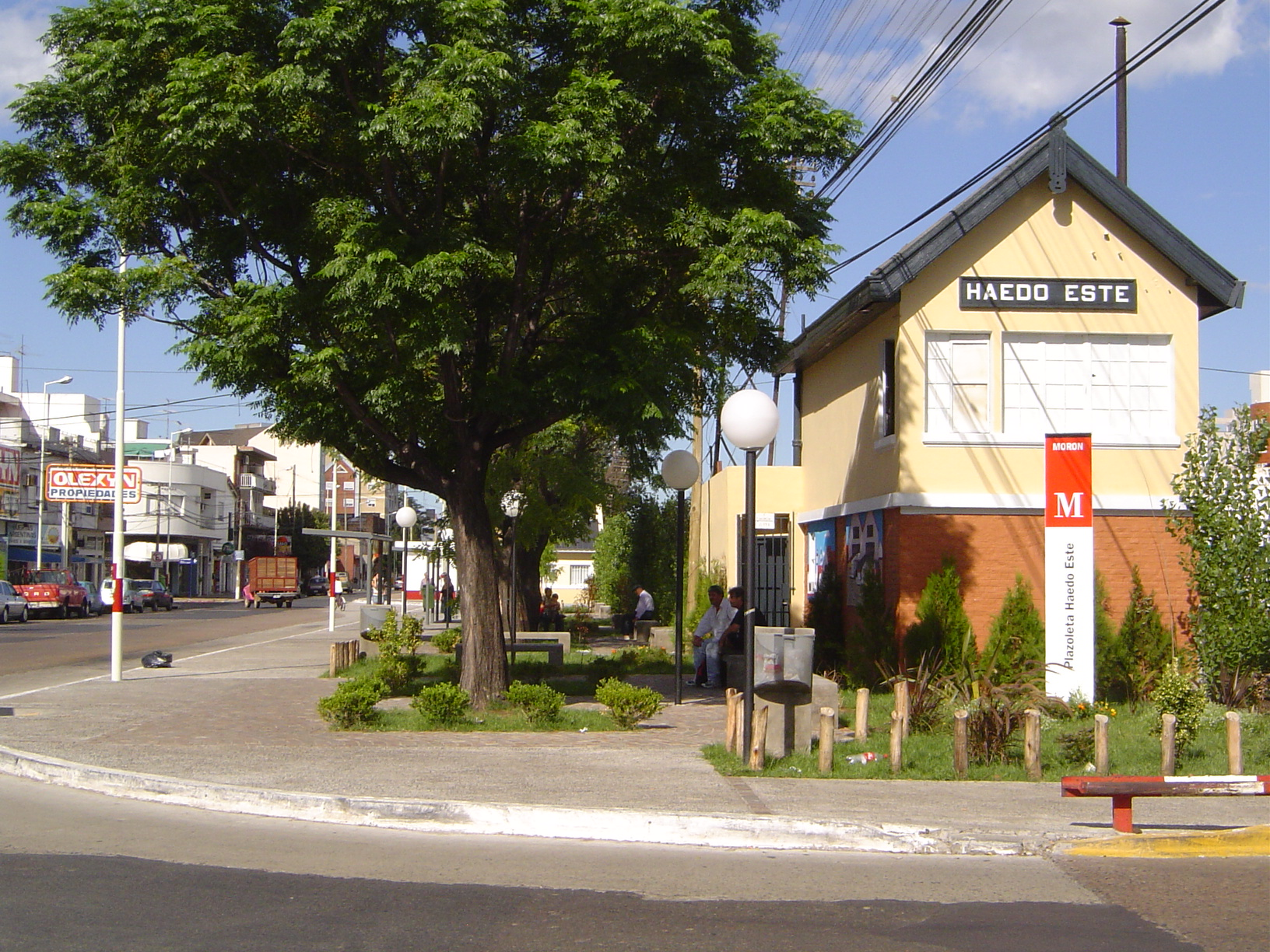
Haedo Este Plazolette

With a surface of 6.11 km², it had 38,068 inhabitants as of 2001, down 13% from the 1991 census. Nonetheless, it is the fourth most populated unit (localidad) in Morón Partido, with a 12% of the total.

This city was the place of residence of the Buenos Aires governor Manuel Fresco located between Caseros 200 and Llavallol 1220.

== Transport ==
The railway station was opened on 1 August 1886, and it was originally serviced by the Buenos Aires Western Railway.

Aerial video of Haedo facing east with the city of Buenos Aires on the horizon
