= Deian Verón =

Argentine footballer

Personal information
- Date of birth: 25 September 2000 (age 26)
- Place of birth: La Plata, Argentina
- Height: 1.83 m (6 ft 0 in)
- Position: Midfielder

Team information
- Current team: Bella Italia

Youth career
- Estudiantes de La Plata

Senior career*
Years	Team	Apps	(Gls)
2021–2024	Estudiantes de La Plata	8	(0)
2022	→ Central Córdoba SdE (loan)	19	(1)
2024	→ Deportes La Serena (loan)	0	(0)
2025	Miami FC	25	(0)
2026–	Bella Italia	0	(0)
- * Club domestic league appearances and goals as of 12 March 2026

Deian Verón (born 25 September 2000) is an Argentine professional footballer who plays as a midfielder for Uruguayan Primera División Amateur club Bella Italia.

== Career ==
Verón began in Estudiantes' academy, he made his reserves debut on 24 November 2017 versus Atlético Tucumán under Leandro Benítez. He was promoted into Ricardo Zielinski's first-team in January 2021 and was assigned shirt number 11; the same number his father and grandfather wore for the club. He initially appeared on the substitute's bench for Copa de la Liga Profesional matches against River Plate, Godoy Cruz and Racing Club. Aged twenty, Verón made his senior debut on 7 March during a 5–0 win in the Copa de la Liga away to Arsenal de Sarandí; he replaced Juan Sánchez Miño off the bench.

In January 2022, Verón was loaned out to Central Córdoba SdE until the end of 2022. On 14 July 2022, he scored his first goal in the first division of Argentina.

In 2024, he was loaned out to Primera B de Chile side Deportes La Serena. On February 11, 2024, before the start of the regular season, he suffered a ligament injury that left him off the field for several months. In May he decided to return to Estudiantes to continue his physical recovery.

In mid-December 2024, he terminated his contract with Estudiantes de La Plata and joined Miami F.C. of the USL Championship, the second division of United States soccer.

== Personal life ==
Verón comes from a footballing family. His father (Juan Sebastián), uncle (Iani), grandfather (Juan Ramón) and great-uncle (Pedro Verde) all played professional football.

== Career statistics ==
As of 1 January 2025.

Appearances and goals by club, season and competition
Club	Season	League			Cup		League Cup		Continental		Other		Total	
Club	Season	Division	Apps	Goals	Apps	Goals	Apps	Goals	Apps	Goals	Apps	Goals	Apps	Goals
Estudiantes	2021	Primera División	1	0	0	0	1	0	—		0	0	2	0
Estudiantes	2023	Primera División	2	0	0	0	2	0	2	0	—		6	0
Estudiantes	Total		3	0	0	0	3	0	2	0	0	0	8	0
Central Córdoba	2022	Primera División	14	1	0	0	5	0	—		0	0	19	1
Central Córdoba	Total		14	1	0	0	5	0	0	0	0	0	19	1
Deportes La Serena	2024	Segunda División	0	0	0	0	0	0	—		0	0	0	0
Deportes La Serena	Total		0	0	0	0	0	0	0	0	0	0	0	0
Miami FC	2025	Second Division	0	0	0	0	0	0	—		0	0	0	0
Miami FC	Total		0	0	0	0	0	0	0	0	0	0	0	0
Career total			17	1	0	0	8	0	2	0	0	0	27	1
