= Francisco Bonfiglio =

Argentine footballer

Personal information
- Date of birth: 2 January 2002 (age 24)
- Place of birth: Mar del Plata, Argentina
- Height: 1.82 m (6 ft 0 in)
- Position: Forward

Team information
- Current team: Boston River
- Number: 9

Youth career
- –2018: San Lorenzo
- 2018–2023: Villarreal

Senior career*
Years	Team	Apps	(Gls)
2023–2025	Villarreal	0	(0)
2023	→ Independiente (loan)	0	(0)
2024–2025	→ Atlético Tucumán (loan)	0	(0)
2025–2026	Miami FC	29	(14)
2026–	Boston River	16	(4)
- * Club domestic league appearances and goals as of 12:02, 28 May 2026 (UTC)

Francisco Bonfiglio (born 2 January 2002) is an Argentine footballer who plays for USL Championship club Miami FC.

== Club career ==
As a youth, Bonfiglio had stints at San Lorenzo and Independiente in his native Argentina and Villarreal of Spain's La Liga. He made his senior debut while on loan to Atlético Tucumán in 2024. In February 2025, it was announced that he had signed for Miami FC of the USL Championship in the United States.

Bonfiglio scored his first two goals for Miami in a 2025 U.S. Open Cup victory over Naples United FC on 18 March 2025. Six days later he scored his first league goal for the club in a 1–2 loss against the Tampa Bay Rowdies. During his first season with Miami FC, Bonfiglio scored fourteen goals in twenty-nine league matches.

After his performances with Miami FC in 2025, Bonfiglio returned to South America, signing for Boston River of the Liga AUF Uruguaya for the 2026 season.
