= Segra Field =

Association football stadium in Loudoun County, Virginia, United States

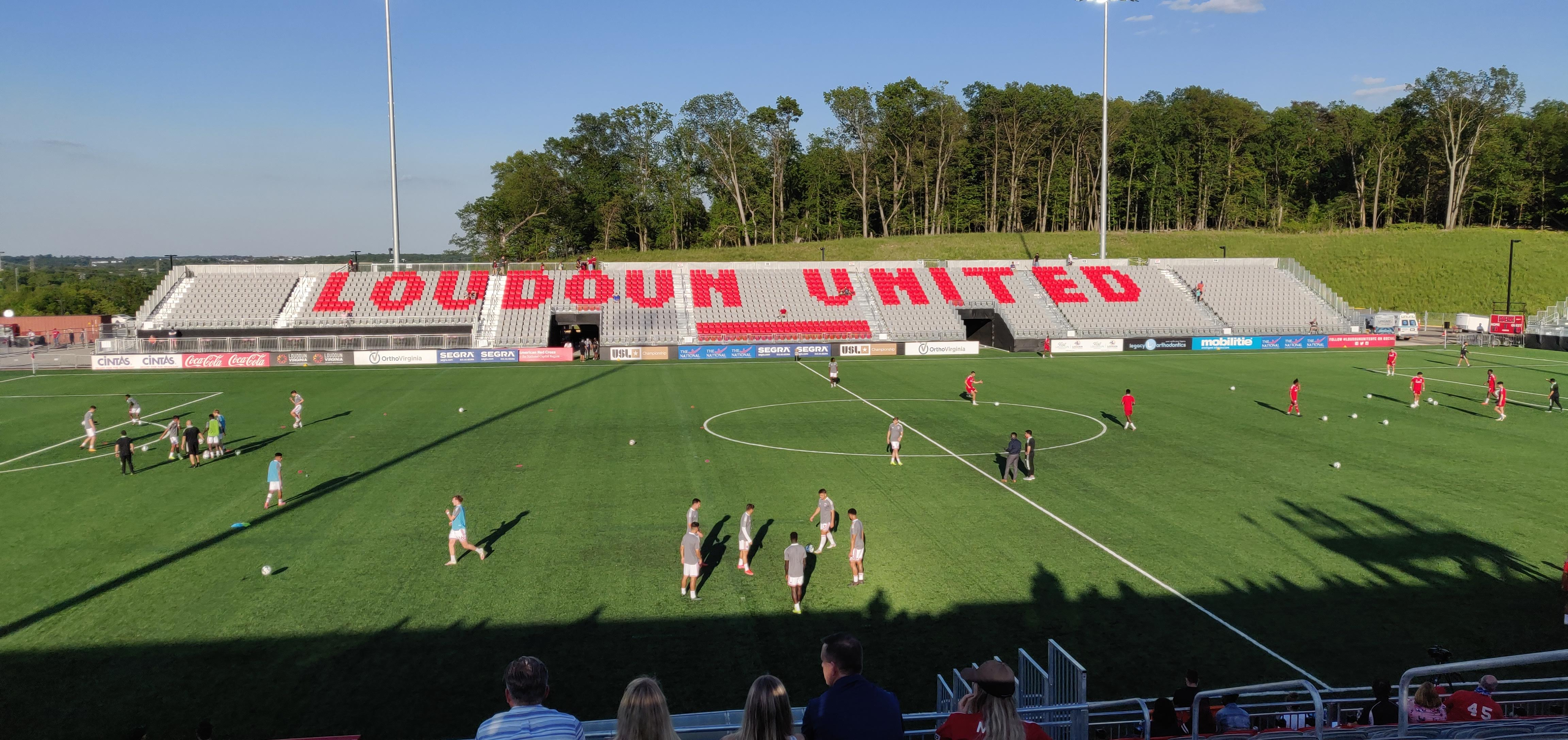

- Location within Virginia Location within the United States
- Interactive map of Segra Field
- Former names: Loudoun United Stadium (pre-construction)
- Location: Leesburg, Virginia
- Coordinates: 39°04′08.5″N 77°32′44.1″W
- Owner: Loudoun County
- Operator: Attain Sports and Entertainment
- Capacity: 5,000

Construction
- Groundbreaking: March 26, 2019
- Opened: August 9, 2019
- Cost: $15 million

Tenants
- Loudoun United FC (USLC) 2019–present Old Glory DC (MLR) 2021–2023; Washington Spirit (NWSL) 2020–2022

Segra Field is a soccer-specific stadium in Leesburg, Virginia, and the home of Loudoun United FC of the USL Championship and previously Old Glory DC of Major League Rugby.

The stadium is located within Phillip A. Bolen Park, and adjacent to Loudoun Soccer Park. In addition to the stadium, a training facility, and team offices for D.C. United of MLS and youth development academy will be housed there. The project was supposed to be completed in time for the 2019 USL season, but the completion date was moved to August 2019 due to zoning issues.

== History ==
The stadium hosted its first game on August 9, 2019, as Loudoun United FC played Charlotte Independence at the stadium. On July 8, 2019, Segra, a fiber-based telecommunications company formerly known as Lumos Networks, signed a multi-year agreement to become the naming-rights partner for the stadium. Loudoun United FC won their first game in Segra Field on August 31, 2019, defeating North Carolina FC 4–0.

On December 4, 2019, Loudoun United FC asked the Loudoun County Board of Supervisors for $10 million to complete the stadium. They asked for assistance to complete public bathrooms, locker rooms, parking, and a new training facility.

On November 12, 2019, the Washington Spirit of the National Women's Soccer League (NWSL) announced that in the 2020 season, they will split their home games between three stadiums: the Maryland SoccerPlex, Audi Field and Segra Field. In the 2021 season they will use just Audi Field and Segra Field, with four games played at each. Due to the renovation project's delays, the opening match of the Spirit's 2021 season was moved to Houston.

On October 22, 2020, Old Glory DC of Major League Rugby (MLR) announced that starting in the 2021 season the team will move to Segra for their home matches.
