= List of New York–Penn League champions =

The New York–Penn League of Minor League Baseball was a professional baseball league in the United States from 1939 to 2020. A league champion was determined at the end of each season. Champions were decided by postseason playoffs, winning the regular season pennant, or being declared champion by the league office. In its final season of operation, three division winners and a wild card team (the team with the best second-place record in the league) were determined at the end of the season. The division champion with the highest winning percentage played the wild card team, while the other two division champions faced each other in best-of-three series. The winners then played one another in a best-of-three series to determine the league champion.

== League champions ==
Score and finalist information is only presented when postseason play occurred. The lack of this information indicates a declared league champion.

Year	Champion	Score	Finalist
1939	Olean Oilers	4–2	Hamilton Red Wings
1940	Olean Oilers	4–2	Batavia Clippers
1941	Bradford Bees	4–1	Hamilton Red Wings
1942	Jamestown Falcons	4–2	Olean Oilers
1943	Wellsville Yankees	4–3	Jamestown Falcons
1944	Jamestown Falcons	4–0	Lockport Cubs
1945	Batavia Clippers	4–3	Lockport White Socks
1946	Batavia Clippers	4–2	Lockport Cubs
1947	Jamestown Falcons	4–2	Olean Oilers
1948	Lockport Reds	4–1	Jamestown Falcons
1949	Bradford Blue Wings	4–1	Hamilton Red Wings
1950	Olean Oilers	4–2	Hornell Dodgers
1951	Hornell Dodgers	4–3	Olean Oilers
1952	Jamestown Falcons	4–0	Hornell Dodgers
1953	Jamestown Falcons	4–1	Hamilton Red Wings
1954	Corning Red Sox	4–1	Jamestown Falcons
1955	Hamilton Red Wings	3–0	Corning Red Sox
1956	Wellsville Braves	3–2	Olean Oilers
1957	Erie Sailors	3–1	Batavia Indians
1958	Geneva Redlegs	3–0	Wellsville Braves
1959	Wellsville Braves	3–2	Elmira Pioneers
1960	Wellsville Braves	2–1	Erie Sailors
1961	Olean Red Sox	2–1	Batavia Pirates
1962	Auburn Mets	2–0	Olean Red Sox
1963	Batavia Pirates	2–1	Jamestown Tigers
1964	Auburn Mets	4–2	Geneva Senators
1965	Binghamton Triplets	—	—
1966	Auburn Mets	2–0	Binghamton Triplets
1967	Auburn Twins	—	—
1968	Oneonta Yankees	1–0	Auburn Twins
1969	Oneonta Yankees	—	—
1970	Auburn Twins	—	—
1971	Oneonta Yankees	—	—
1972	Niagara Falls Pirates	—	—
1973	Auburn Phillies	—	—
1974	Oneonta Yankees	—	—
1975	Newark Co-Pilots	—	—
1976	Elmira Pioneers	—	—
1977	Oneonta Yankees	2–0	Batavia Trojans
1978	Geneva Cubs	2–0	Auburn Sunsets
1979	Oneonta Yankees	2–0	Geneva Cubs
1980	Oneonta Yankees	2–1	Geneva Cubs
1981	Oneonta Yankees	2–1	Jamestown Expos
1982	Niagara Falls Sox	2–1	Oneonta Yankees
1983	Utica Blue Sox	2–1	Newark Orioles
1984	Little Falls Mets	2–1	Newark Orioles
1985	Oneonta Yankees	2–0	Auburn Astros
1986	St. Catharines Blue Jays	2–1	Newark Orioles
1987	Geneva Cubs	2–0	Watertown Pirates
1988	Oneonta Yankees	2–0	Jamestown Expos
1989	Jamestown Expos	2–1	Pittsfield Mets
1990	Oneonta Yankees	2–1	Erie Sailors
1991	Jamestown Expos	2–0	Pittsfield Mets
1992	Geneva Cubs	2–0	Erie Sailors
1993	Niagara Falls Rapids	2–0	Pittsfield Mets
1994	New Jersey Cardinals	2–0	Auburn Astros
1995	Watertown Indians	2–1	Vermont Expos
1996	Vermont Expos	2–1	St. Catharines Stompers
1997	Pittsfield Mets	2–1	Batavia Clippers
1998^{[a]}	Auburn Doubledays; Oneonta Yankees	—	—
1999	Hudson Valley Renegades	2–1	Mahoning Valley Scrappers
2000	Staten Island Yankees	2–1	Mahoning Valley Scrappers
2001^{[b]}	Brooklyn Cyclones; Williamsport Crosscutters	—	—
2002	Staten Island Yankees	2–0	Oneonta Tigers
2003	Williamsport Crosscutters	2–0	Brooklyn Cyclones
2004	Mahoning Valley Scrappers	2–0	Tri-City ValleyCats
2005	Staten Island Yankees	2–0	Auburn Doubledays
2006	Staten Island Yankees	2–1	Tri-City ValleyCats
2007	Auburn Doubledays	2–0	Brooklyn Cyclones
2008	Batavia Muckdogs	2–0	Jamestown Jammers
2009	Staten Island Yankees	2–1	Mahoning Valley Scrappers
2010	Tri-City ValleyCats	2–0	Brooklyn Cyclones
2011	Staten Island Yankees	2–0	Auburn Doubledays
2012	Hudson Valley Renegades	2–1	Tri-City ValleyCats
2013	Tri-City ValleyCats	2–1	State College Spikes
2014	State College Spikes	2–1	Tri-City ValleyCats
2015	West Virginia Black Bears	2–0	Staten Island Yankees
2016	State College Spikes	2–0	Hudson Valley Renegades
2017	Hudson Valley Renegades	2–0	Vermont Lake Monsters
2018	Tri-City ValleyCats	2–0	Hudson Valley Renegades
2019	Brooklyn Cyclones	2–1	Lowell Spinners
2020	None (season cancelled due to COVID-19 pandemic)		

== Championship wins by team ==
Wins	Team	Championship years
12	Oneonta Yankees	1968, 1969, 1971, 1974, 1977, 1979, 1980, 1981, 1985, 1988, 1990, 1998
8	Auburn Mets/Twins/Phillies/Doubledays	1962, 1964, 1966, 1967, 1970, 1973, 1998, 2007
7	Jamestown Falcons/Expos	1942, 1944, 1947, 1952, 1953, 1989, 1991
6	Staten Island Yankees	2000, 2002, 2005, 2006, 2009, 2011
4	Batavia Clippers/Pirates/Muckdogs	1945, 1946, 1963, 2008
4	Geneva Redlegs/Cubs	1958, 1978, 1987, 1992
4	Olean Oilers/Red Sox	1939, 1940, 1950, 1961
4	Wellsville Yankees/Braves	1943, 1956, 1959, 1960
3	Hudson Valley Renegades	1999, 2012, 2017
3	Niagara Falls Pirates/Sox/Rapids	1972, 1982, 1993
3	Tri-City ValleyCats	2010, 2013, 2018
2	Bradford Bees/Blue Wings	1941, 1949
2	Brooklyn Cyclones	2001, 2019
2	State College Spikes	2014, 2016
2	Williamsport Crosscutters	2001, 2003
1	Binghamton Triplets	1965
1	Corning Red Sox	1954
1	Elmira Pioneers	1976
1	Erie Sailors	1957
1	Hamilton Red Wings	1955
1	Hornell Dodgers	1951
1	Little Falls Mets	1984
1	Lockport Reds	1948
1	Mahoning Valley Scrappers	2004
1	New Jersey Cardinals	1994
1	Newark Co-Pilots	1975
1	Pittsfield Mets	1997
1	St. Catharines Blue Jays	1986
1	Utica Blue Sox	1983
1	Vermont Expos	1996
1	Watertown Indians	1995
1	West Virginia Black Bears	2015

== See also ==
- New York–Penn League
- New York–Penn League Hall of Fame

== Notes ==
- ^{a} Auburn and Oneonta were declared co-champions when torrential rains in Central New York rendered both teams' fields unplayable.
- ^{b} Brooklyn and Williamsport were declared co-champions after the playoffs were cancelled in the wake the September 11 terrorist attacks.
