= New York–Penn League Hall of Fame =

- Established: 2012
- Dissolved: 2021
- Type: Professional sports hall of fame
- Website: Official website

The New York–Penn League Hall of Fame is an American baseball hall of fame which honors players, managers, and executives of the New York–Penn League of Minor League Baseball for their accomplishments or contributions to the league in playing or administrative roles. The Hall of Fame inducted its first class in 2012. Thirty-one individuals have been inducted into the New York–Penn League Hall of Fame. The league was shuttered in 2021.

== Table key ==
| † | Indicates a member of the National Baseball Hall of Fame and Museum |
| Year | Indicates the year of induction |
| Position(s) | Indicates the player's primary playing position(s) or association with the league |
| Team inducted as | Indicates the team for which the individual has been recognized |

== Inductees ==
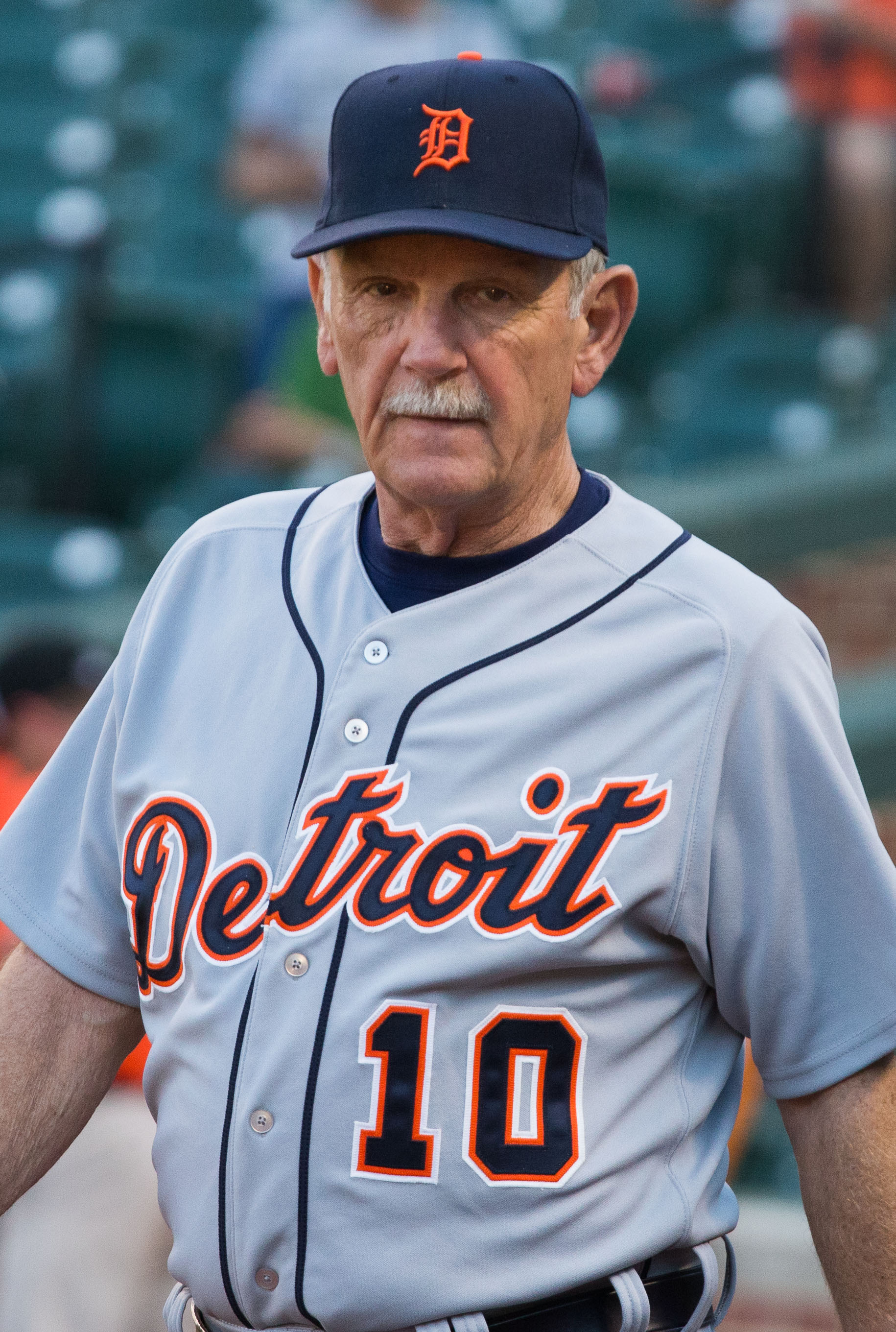
Jim Leyland was a catcher for the Jamestown Tigers in 1965.

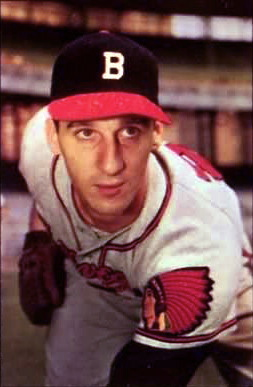
Warren Spahn pitched for the Bradford Bees in 1940.

| Year | Name | Position(s) | Team inducted as |
|---|---|---|---|
| 2012 | Wade Boggs^{†} | Third baseman | Elmira Pioneers |
| 2012 | Nellie Fox^{†} | Second baseman | Jamestown Falcons |
| 2012 | Phil Niekro^{†} | Pitcher | Wellsville Braves |
| 2012 | Tony Pérez^{†} | Third baseman | Geneva Redlegs |
| 2012 | Jim Rice^{†} | Outfielder | Williamsport Red Sox |
| 2012 | Warren Spahn^{†} | Pitcher | Bradford Bees |
| 2012 | Robin Yount^{†} | Shortstop | Newark Co-Pilots |
| 2013 | Robert Julian | League President | New York–Penn League |
| 2013 | Vince McNamara | League President | New York–Penn League |
| 2013 | Sam Nader | Team owner | Oneonta Yankees |
| 2013 | Leo Pinckney | League President | New York–Penn League |
| 2013 | Robert Stedler | League founder | New York–Penn League |
| 2014 | John Elway | Outfielder | Oneonta Yankees |
| 2014 | Randy Johnson^{†} | Pitcher | Jamestown Expos |
| 2014 | Charlie Wride | League historian | New York–Penn League |
| 2015 | Jim Leyland | Catcher | Jamestown Tigers |
| 2015 | Don Mattingly | Outfielder | Oneonta Yankees |
| 2015 | Paul Velte | Team owner | Geneva/Williamsport |
| 2016 | Dick Allen | Shortstop | Elmira Pioneers |
| 2016 | Jorge Posada | Second baseman | Oneonta Yankees |
| 2016 | Pete Rose | Second baseman | Geneva Redlegs |
| 2017 | Warner Fusselle | Radio broadcaster | Brooklyn Cyclones |
| 2017 | William L. Gladstone | Team owner | Tri-City ValleyCats |
| 2017 | Buck Showalter | Manager | Oneonta Yankees |
| 2018 | Wayne Fuller | Radio broadcaster | Batavia Muckdogs |
| 2018 | Andrés Galarraga | Catcher/First baseman | Jamestown Expos |
| 2018 | Marvin Goldklang | Team owner | Hudson Valley Renegades |
| 2019 | Gene Baker | Manager | Batavia Pirates |
| 2019 | Jane Rogers | Executive | Staten Island Yankees |
| 2019 | Josiah Viera | Honorary coach | State College Spikes |
| 2019 | Bernie Williams | Outfielder | Oneonta Yankees |

== See also ==
- New York–Penn League
- List of New York–Penn League champions
