= Lockport Locks =

- 1942–1951; Lockport, New York

Minor league affiliations
- Class: Class C (1951); Class D (1942–1950)
- League: Middle Atlantic League (1951); PONY League (1942–1950)

Major league affiliations
- Team: Cincinnati Reds (1947–1950); Chicago Cubs (1943–1944); Chicago White Sox (1942)

Minor league titles
- League titles (1): 1948

Team data
- Name: Lockport Locks (1951); Lockport Reds (1947–1950); Lockport Cubs (1946); Lockport White Socks (1945); Lockport Cubs (1943–1944); Lockport White Sox (1942)
- Ballpark: Outwater Stadium

The Lockport Locks were a minor league baseball team based in Lockport, New York. The team began in 1942 as the Lockport White Sox, and affiliate of the Chicago White Sox in the Pennsylvania–Ontario–New York League, which is today the New York–Penn League. In 1943 the team changed affiliations with the Chicago-based major league clubs and became the Lockport Cubs. After spending 1945 as the Lockport White Socks, they were the Cubs again in 1946, however as an unaffiliated team. The team became affiliated with the Cincinnati Reds in 1947 and were renamed the Lockport Reds. A year later the club won the league title.

In 1951 the Reds joined the Middle Atlantic League, and were renamed the Lockport Locks. The team disbanded with league after the 1951 season.

== Notable alumni ==
- Smoky Burgess (1944) 9 x MLB All-Star
- Jim Delsing (1942)

== Year-by-year record ==
Year	Record	Finish	Manager	Playoffs
1943	65-45	1st	Roy Johnson	Lost in 1st round lost to Jamestown Falcons 3 games to 0
1944	76-49	1st	Greg Mulleavy	Lost League Finals defeated Hornell Maples 3 games to 0 lost to Jamestown Falcons 4 games to 0
1945	73-52	3rd	Greg Mulleavy	Lost League Finals defeated Jamestown Falcons 3 games to 1 lost to Batavia Clippers 4 games to 3
1946	51-73	7th	James Moody & Joe Glenn	
1947	61-62	5th	Cecil Scheffel	
1948	76-50	1st	Cecil Scheffel	League Champs defeated Bradford Blue Wings 4 games to 2 defeated Jamestown Falcons 4 games to 1
1949	58-68	6th	Cecil Scheffel	
1950	45-80	8th	Cyril Pfeifer	
1951	65-63	4th	Bill Mongiello & Glenn Gardner	
