= Kim Il-yeop (baseball) =

South Korean baseball player

Free Agent
- Pitcher
- Born: February 15, 1980 (age 45); Daegu, South Korea
- Bats: Right Throws: Right

MLB debut
- 2008, for the Lotte Giants

MLB statistics (through 2010)
- WHIP: 1.308
- ERA: 4.87
- SO: 33

Teams
- Philadelphia Phillies Minor Leagues: Batavia Muckdogs (2001); Lakewood BlueClaws (2002); Korea Baseball Organization: Lotte Giants (2008–2012); Hanwha Eagles (2013)

- Kim Il-yeop
- Hangul: 김일엽
- Hanja: 金一燁
- RR: Gim Ilyeop
- MR: Kim Iryŏp

Kim Il-yeop (born February 15, 1980) is a South Korean professional baseball pitcher.

Kim was born in Daegu, South Korea. He had a minor league stint from 2001 to 2002 for the Philadelphia Phillies, playing for the Batavia Muckdogs and Lakewood BlueClaws. He was then released, and, in 2009, was hired by the Chiba Lotte Marines as a pitcher. After 2010, he was released, and is currently a free agent.
