= Warner Fusselle =

American sportscaster (1944–2012)

Fusselle

Warner Fusselle (April 7, 1944 – June 10, 2012) was an American sportscaster remembered for contributions to the television shows This Week in Baseball and Major League Baseball Magazine, and for his memorable Southern voice. He was an announcer for several Minor League Baseball teams such as the Spartanburg Phillies, Richmond Braves, and the Brooklyn Cyclones from 2001 until his death from a heart attack at age 68. He was also a radio broadcaster for the Virginia Squires of the American Basketball Association until they folded operations in 1976. From 1991 to 2003, he was the radio voice for the Seton Hall Pirates men's basketball team.

In August 2017, Fusselle was inducted into the New York-Penn League Hall of Fame.
