= SIUH Community Park =

Baseball stadium in Staten Island, New York

Staten Island University Hospital Community Park

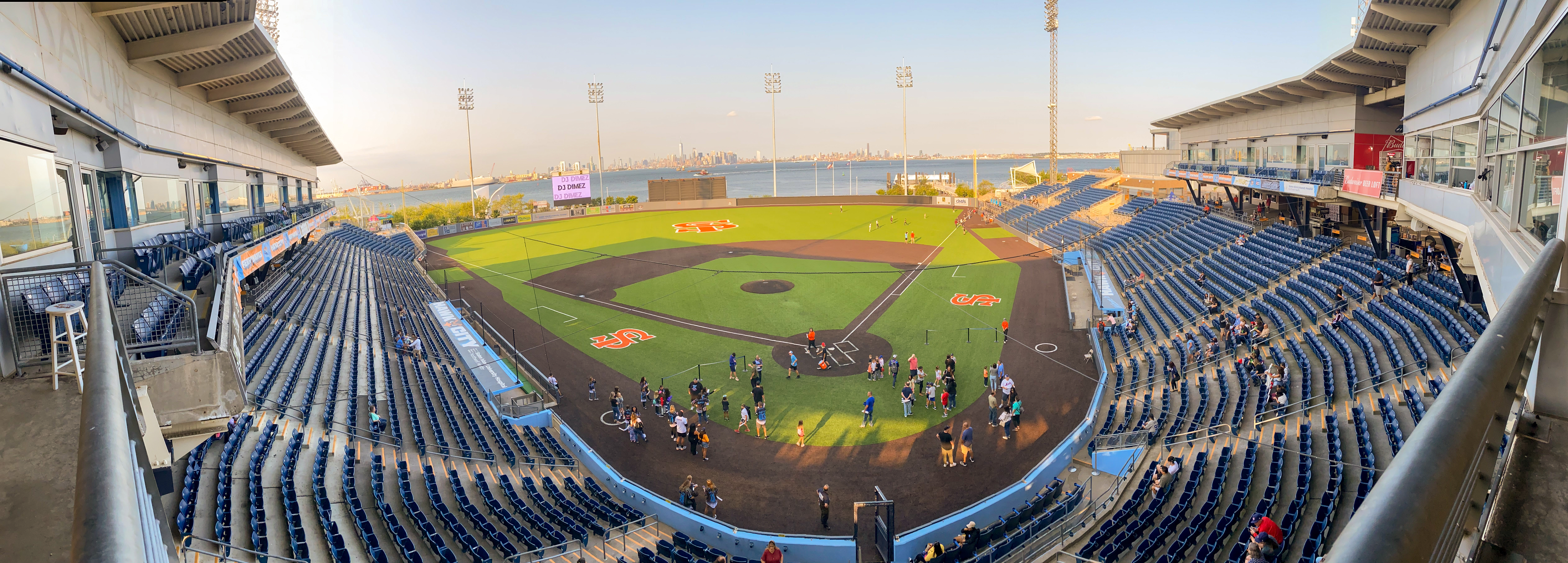

- Location within New York Location within the United States
- Interactive map of Staten Island University Hospital Community Park
- Former names: Richmond County Bank Ballpark at St. George
- Address: 75 Richmond Terrace; Staten Island, New York, 10301
- Coordinates: 40°38′44.07″N 74°4′35.14″W
- Owner: City of New York
- Operator: Staten Island Entertainment LLC
- Capacity: 7,171
- Surface: Natural grass (2001–2022) artificial turf (2022–present)
- Field size: Left Field: 320 ft (98 m); Center Field: 390 ft (119 m); Right Field: 318 ft (97 m)

Construction
- Groundbreaking: June 8, 2000
- Opened: June 24, 2001
- Renovated: 2021–2022
- Cost: $29.5 million ($53.6 million in 2025 dollars)
- Architects: Populous; Architecture +
- Structural engineer: Simpson Gumpertz & Heger Inc.
- General contractor: Bovis Lend Lease

Tenants
- Staten Island Yankees (NYPL) 2001–2020; Staten Island FerryHawks (ALPB) 2022–present Wagner Seahawks baseball (NEC) 2008–2020, 2022–present New York Storm (PC) 2004; MAAC baseball tournament 2018–2019

The Staten Island University Hospital Community Park (also SIUH Community Park; formerly the Richmond County Bank Ballpark) is a baseball stadium located on the northeastern tip of Staten Island in New York City. The ballpark is the home of the Staten Island FerryHawks, a member of the Atlantic League of Professional Baseball, and is the largest stadium in the league by capacity, at 7,171. Since 2022, it has also been the home of the Wagner College Seahawks baseball team and New York University Violets baseball team. In addition, local high schools have the chance to play at least one game a season at the park.

From 2001 to 2020, it hosted the Staten Island Yankees, the New York–Penn League affiliate of the New York Yankees. The ballpark was previously home to the city's Pro Cricket team, the New York Storm, in 2004.

== History ==
View over the outfield fence in 2007

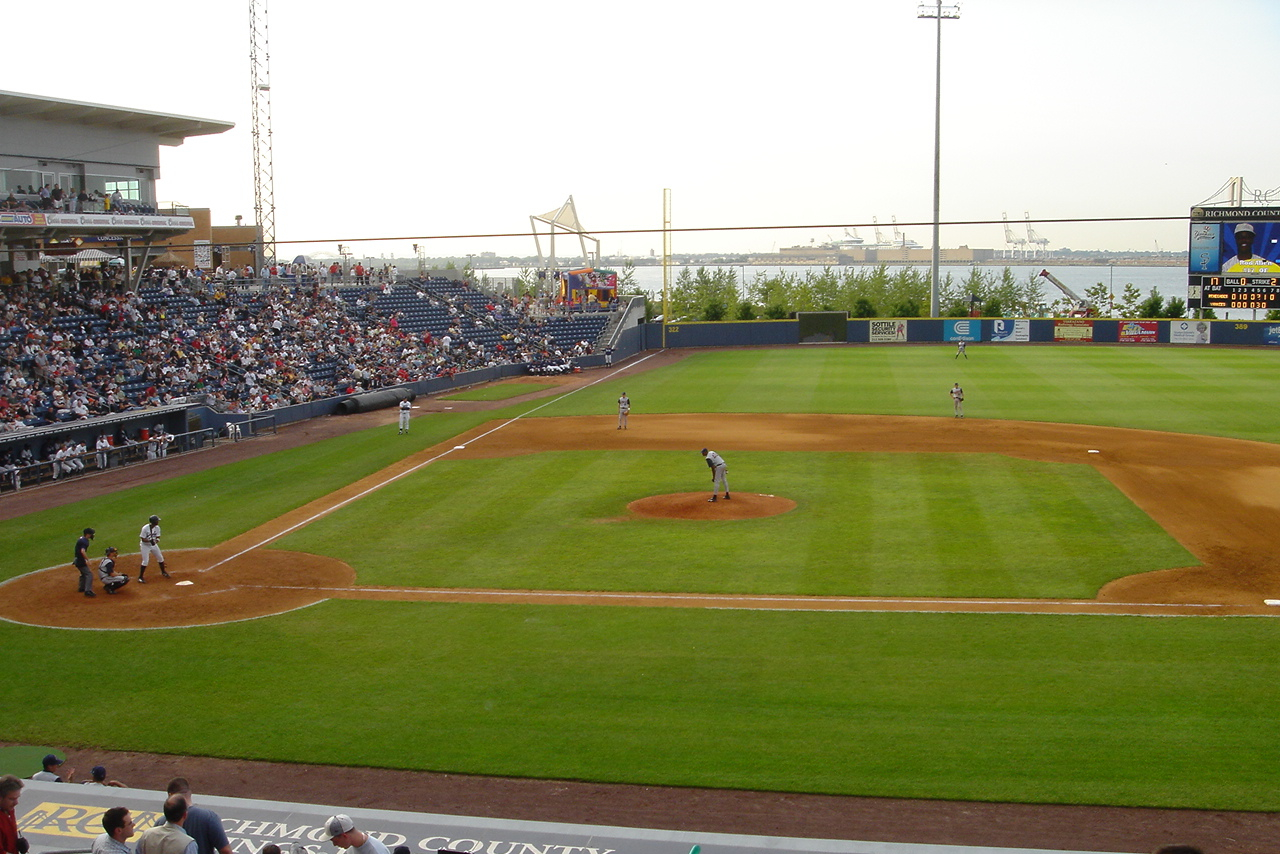
During a game in July 2004

=== Site ===
The site on which the ballpark was built, on St. George overlooking New York Harbor, was once the site of the B&O Railroad rail yards for the City of New York, and the current stadium parking lot was the site of Major League Baseball in the 1880s. The New York Metropolitans of the American Association played at the St. George Grounds in 1886–1887 and the New York Giants played there while awaiting the construction of the second Polo Grounds.

Richmond County Bank Ballpark was part of a deal with both the Yankees and New York Mets, brokered by then-Mayor Rudy Giuliani. Due to Major League Baseball territory rules, the Yankees and Mets have veto power over each other (and any other Major League Baseball franchise), if they want to bring an affiliated minor-league team into the New York City metropolitan area. The Yankees and Mets had attempted to move minor-league teams to the area in the past, only to be turned down with their rival. With help (and public money) from the mayor, both teams agreed to allow each other to have a minor-league team in the city in return for new stadiums. The Mets moved a franchise to a new stadium, called Keyspan Park (renamed Maimonides Park in 2021), in the Coney Island section of Brooklyn.

A groundbreaking ceremony was held on June 8, 2000, upon which RCB's sponsorship was announced. The park opened a little more than a year later on June 24, 2001.

=== Use ===
When the September 11 attacks happened across New York Harbor, the RCB Ballpark was used as a staging area for emergency workers due to its proximity to the Staten Island Ferry's St. George Terminal, and thus to Manhattan. After the attacks, the RCB Ballpark soon became a "spiritual link and sight line to Manhattan" for Staten Island residents.

In 2005, RCB Ballpark hosted two of the four concerts of the Across the Narrows Festival. The other two concerts took place simultaneously at KeySpan Park. On August 17, 2010, RCB Ballpark hosted the NY-Penn League All Star Game. This was the ballpark's first opportunity to host the game and the second time that it was held in New York City.

On August 5, 2017, Impact Wrestling hosted a live event at the stadium. 1,100 fans attended the event.

In 2018 and 2019, the Richmond County Bank Ballpark was host to the MAAC Baseball Tournament.

On November 7, 2020, the New York Yankees announced that they were withdrawing their team from Staten Island, but they would seek to place a team from the independent Atlantic League at Richmond County Bank Ballpark in 2021. The New York City Economic Development Corporation is looking at $5 million in stadium upgrades, including field reconfiguration and synthetic-turf installation, to host Atlantic League games, as well as rugby and soccer. In August 2021, the ballpark's lease was transferred from the Staten Island Yankees to Staten Island Entertainment, owners of the Staten Island FerryHawks of the Atlantic League. In April 2022, the park was renamed Staten Island University Hospital, Community Park (SIUH Community Park), following a five-year naming rights deal with Staten Island University Hospital (owned by Northwell Health).

=== 2012 NYC Olympics Proposed Venue ===
New York City was one of the nine cities who placed a bid for the 2012 Olympic Games. The proposed plan for the Olympics in New York City included RCB Ballpark (known as SIUH Community Park today) being used for softball. London won the bid for the 2012 Olympic Games, and softball and baseball were not included.

== Design ==
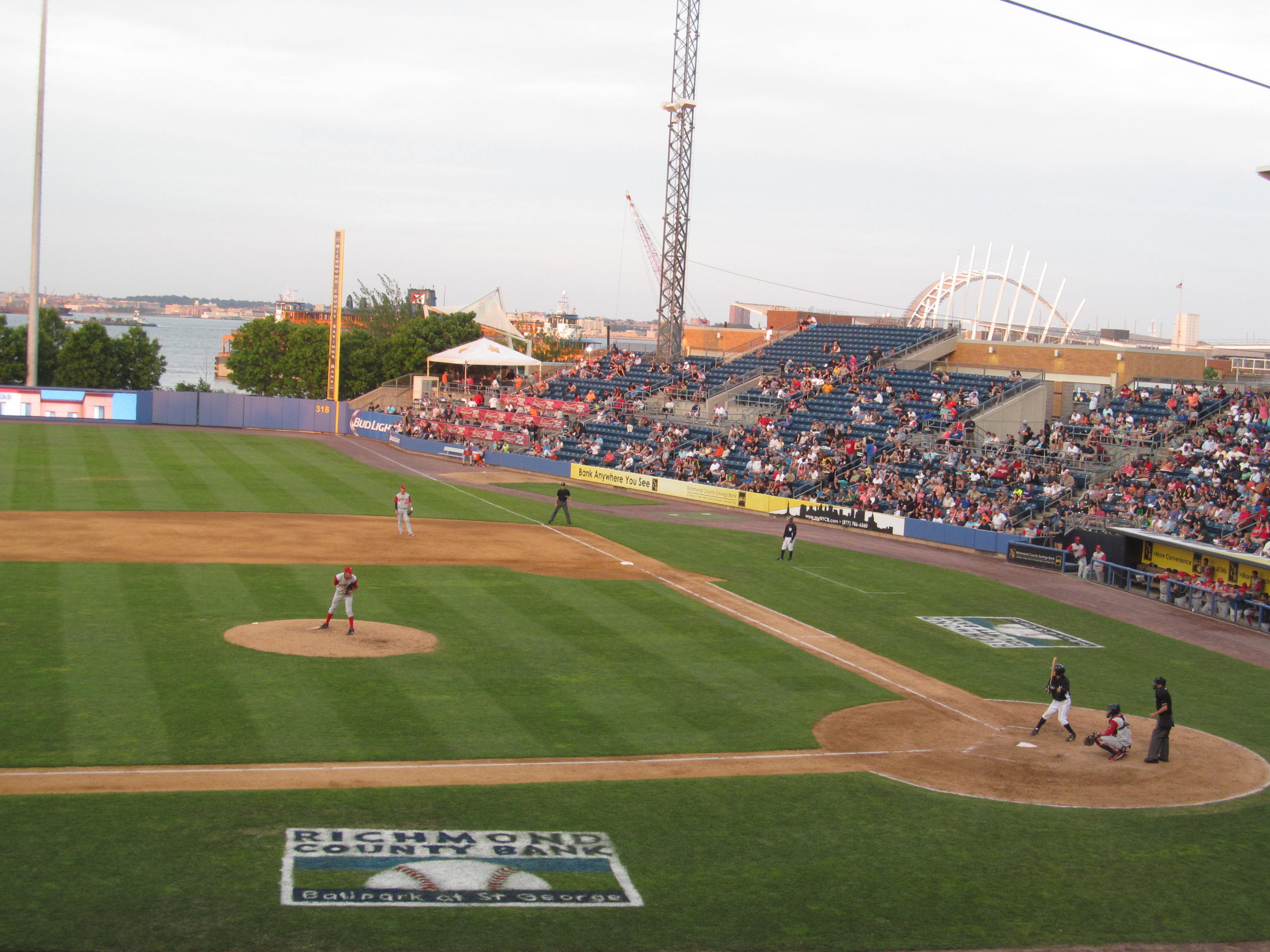
Brooklyn Cyclones vs. Staten Island Yankees on June 28, 2014

SIUH Community Park was designed by Populous and Architecture +. It was designed to take advantage of the stadium's location overlooking New York Harbor. The main entrance to the stadium is located on street level with the seating bowl and field built below street level. Sails at each entrance are a reference to the Staten Island Ferry boats, which frequently pass nearby, and the St. George Ferry Terminal, which is about 0.33 miles (0.53 km) away. The batter's eye in center field is able to retract so that spectators can view the Manhattan skyline.

RCB Ballpark has 18 regular-sized luxury suites along with a 60-person Skyline Suite with one of the best views of the harbor. A small kids' area is located down the left-field line with games.

A replica of the Verrazzano–Narrows Bridge is located on top of the main scoreboard, which formerly contained the letters "RC" attached to the front which was done to resemble the logo of the Richmond County branch of the New York Community Bank, the former of which formerly was the sponsor of the park. The letters were removed in 2022.

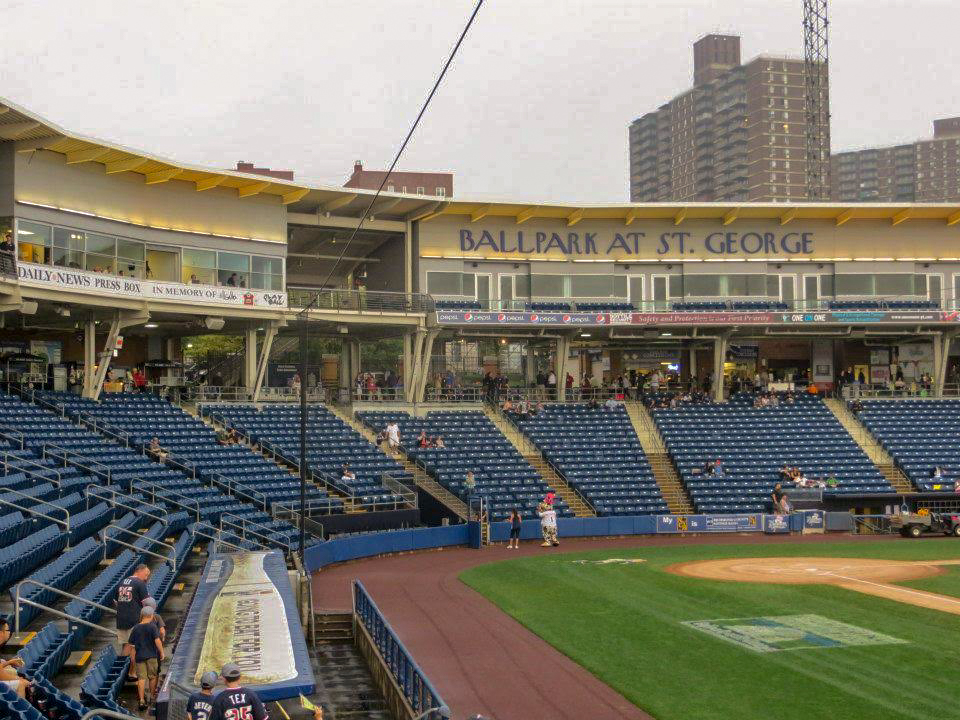
The grandstand of the SIUH Community Park in Staten Island, New York.

The outfield walls have changed several times over the course of the stadium's history. Originally the stadium had four LED video boards spaced out on the outfield wall that would display rotating advertisements throughout the game. After these boards malfunctioned the team replaced them with traditional signage along the wall. These signs were replaced with a new 200-foot-long (61 m) video board in right field in 2007. The new video board is one of the longest in the minors. Also in 2007 the Ballpark received a brand new high-definition main video board on top of the scoreboard.

== Transportation ==
The St. George Terminal of the Staten Island Ferry is less than a five-minute walk from the ballpark. The S40 and S44 buses directly serve the stadium, but the stadium is accessible from the buses that terminate at the St. George Ferry Terminal.

The St. George station of the Staten Island Railway is also at the ferry terminal. From 2001 to 2009, on game days during the baseball season, SIR trains served the RCB Ballpark station adjacent to the stadium, with trains from both St. George and Tottenville. In 2010, train service to RCB Ballpark station was suspended due to budget cuts from the MTA.

== Gallery ==
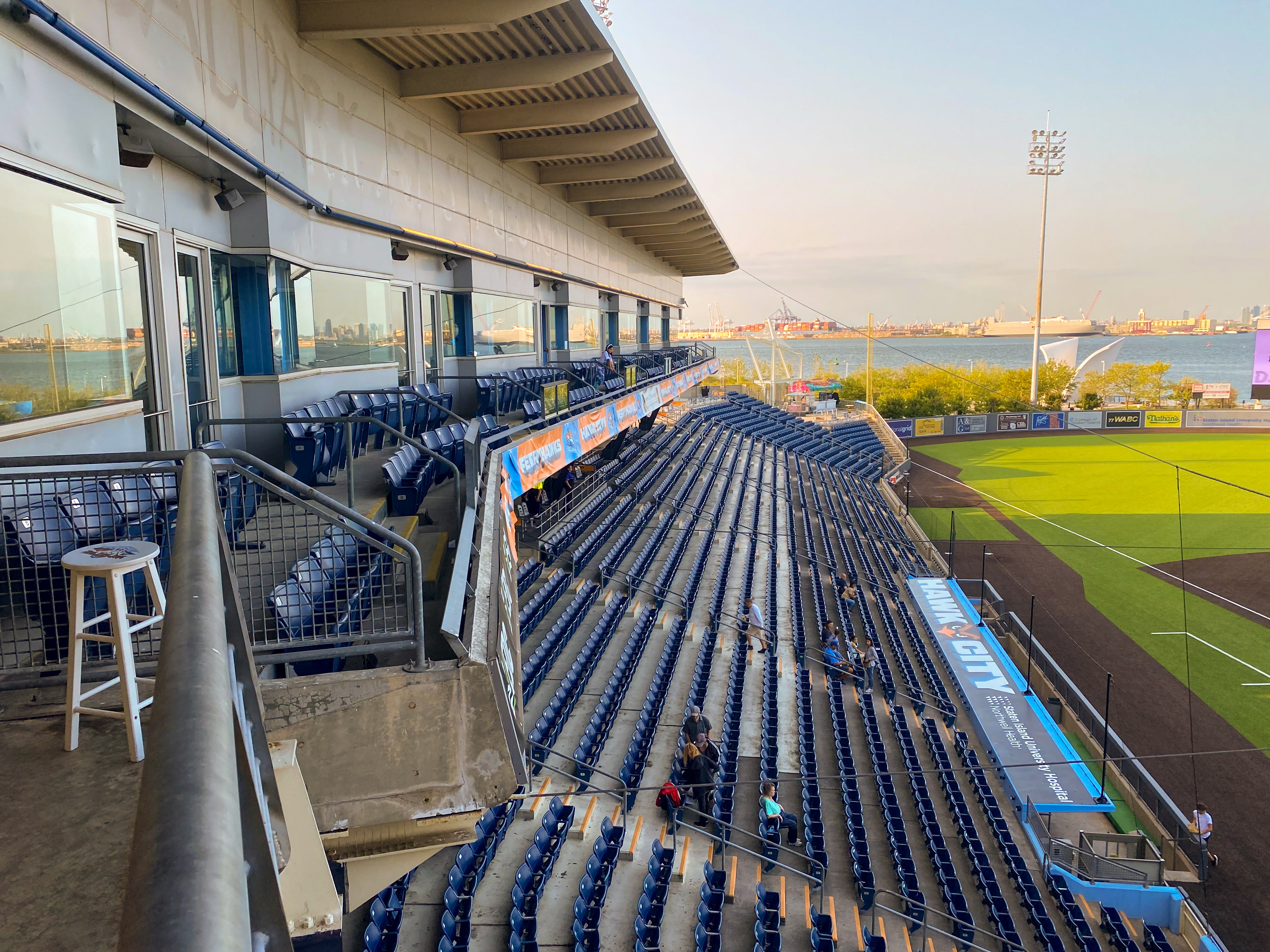

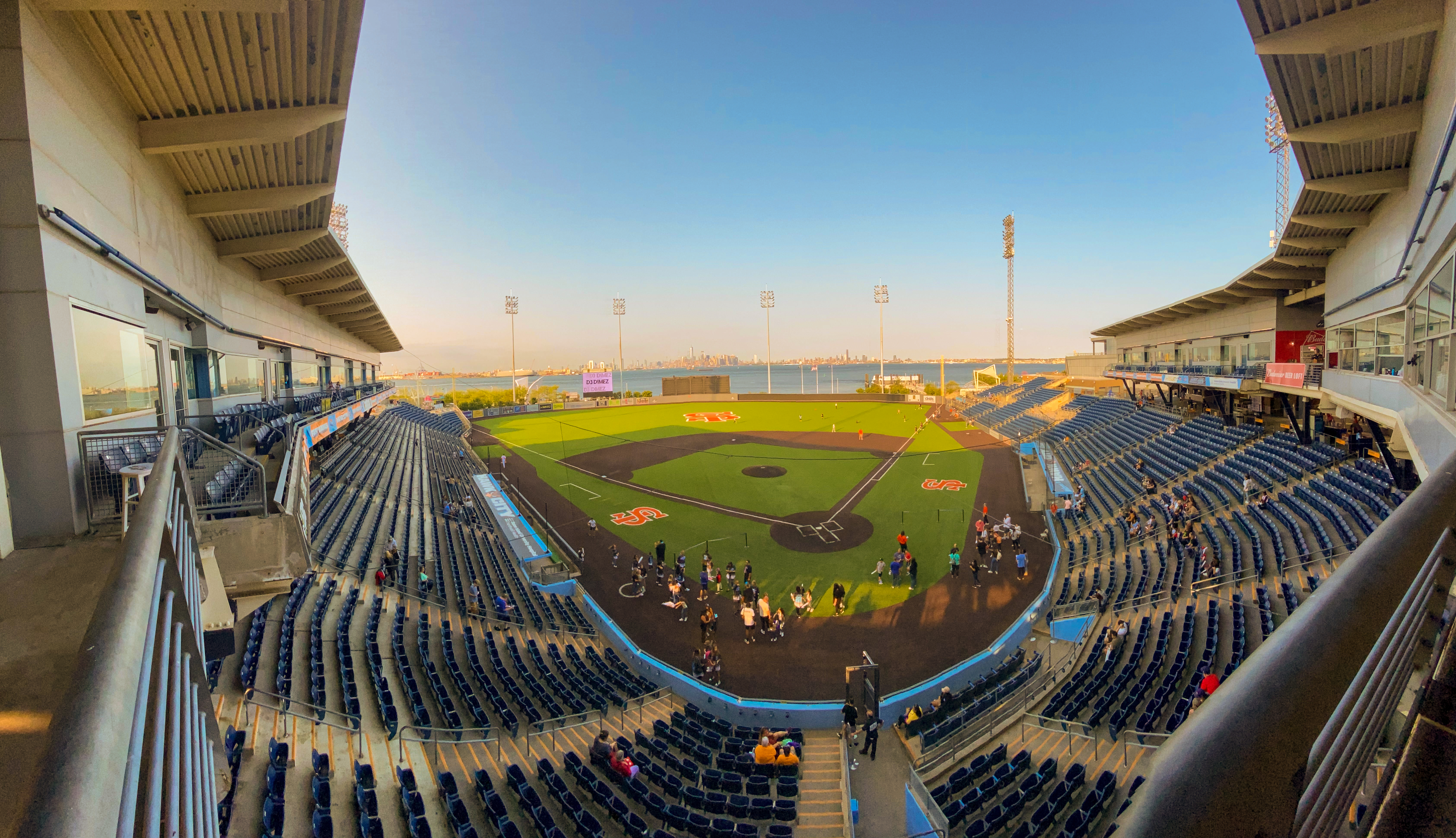

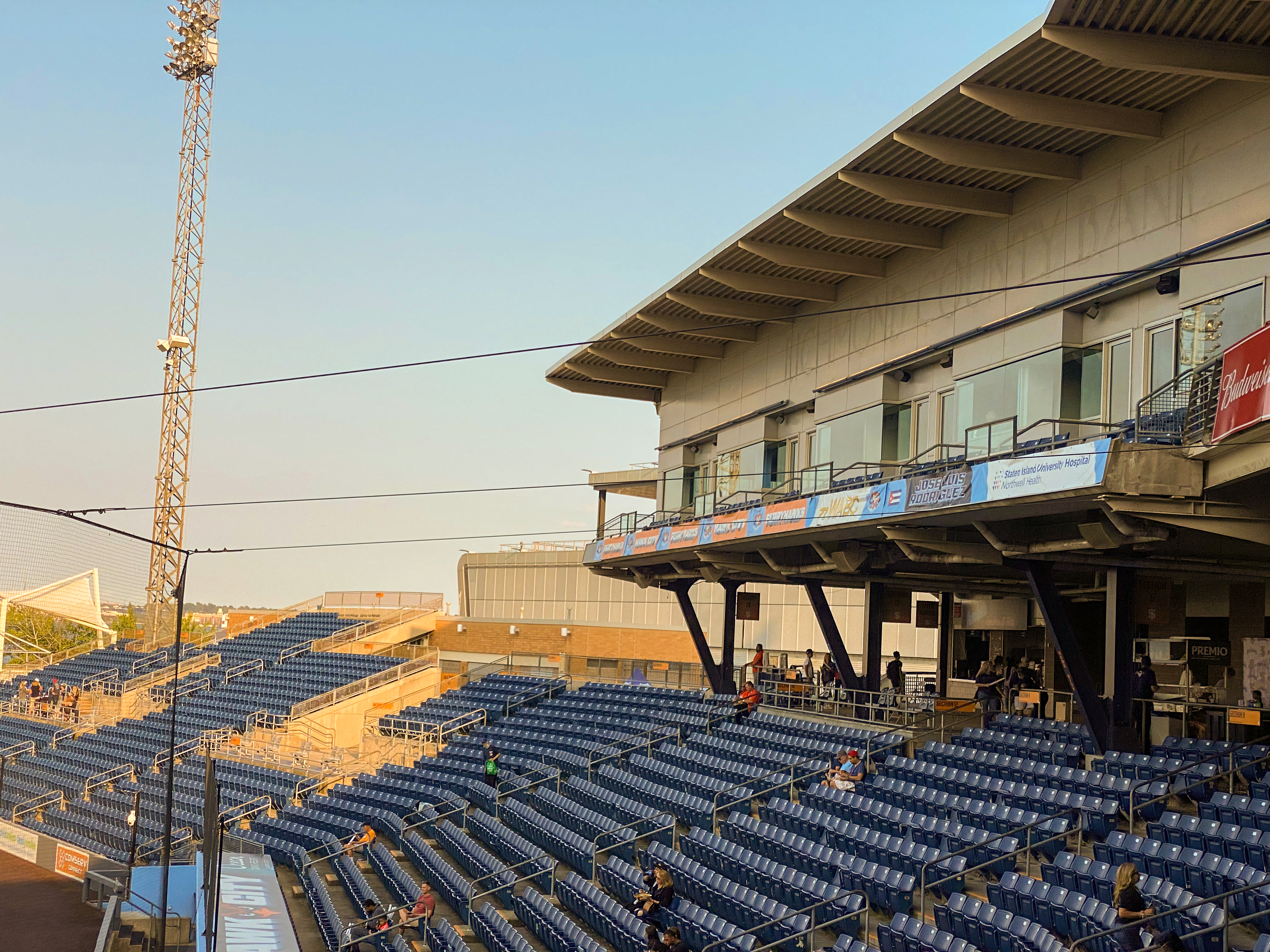

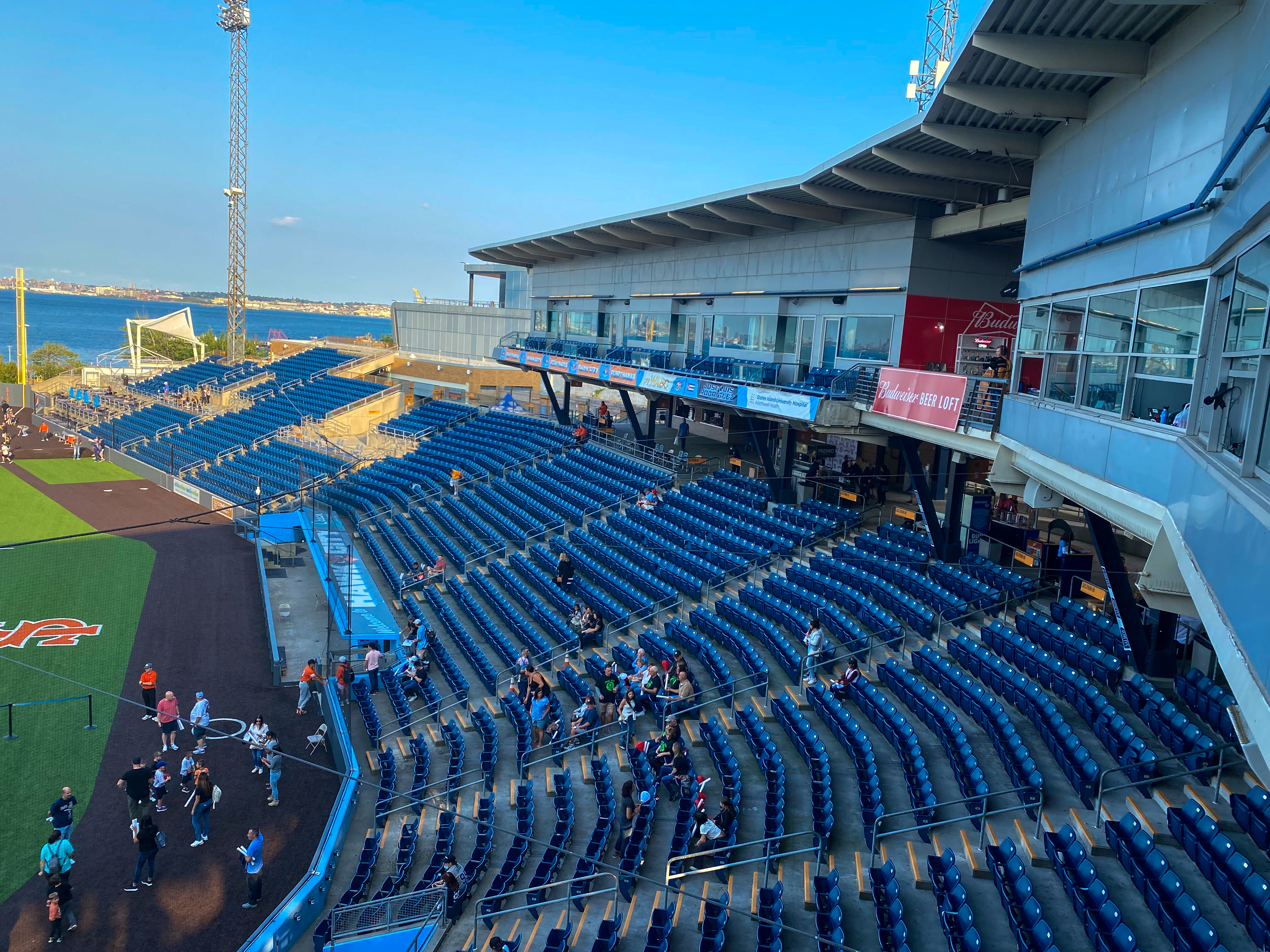

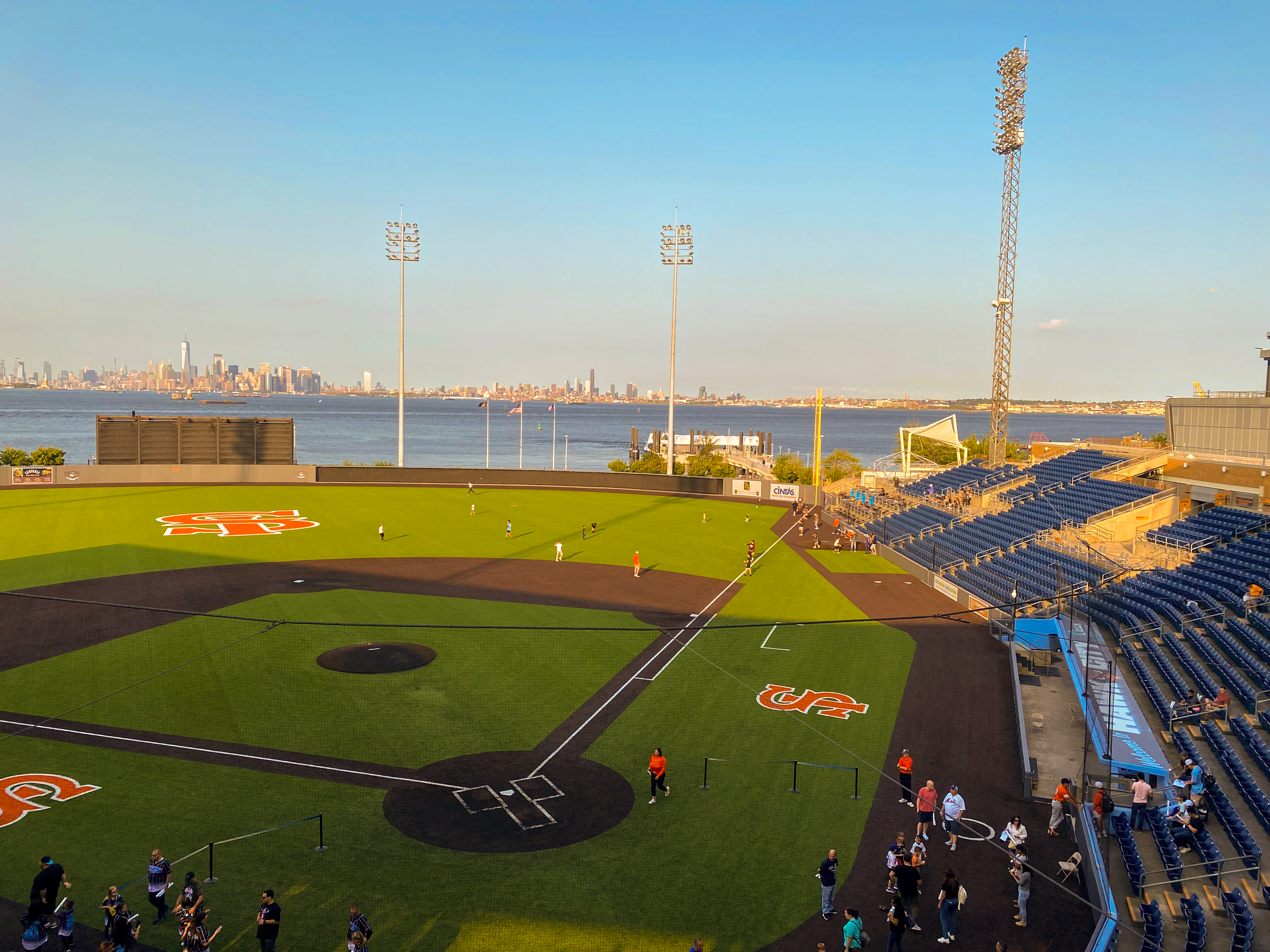

== See also ==
- List of NCAA Division I baseball venues
