= Gene Baker =

American baseball player (1925–1999)

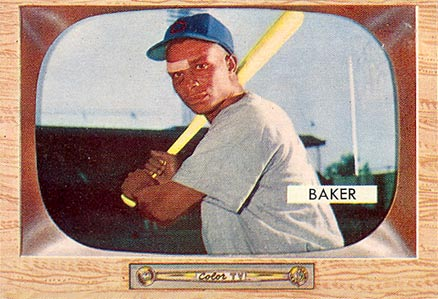
- Second baseman
- Born: June 15, 1925; Davenport, Iowa, U.S.
- Died: December 1, 1999 (aged 74); Davenport, Iowa, U.S.
- Batted: Right Threw: Right

Professional debut
- NgL: 1948, for the Kansas City Monarchs
- MLB: September 20, 1953, for the Chicago Cubs

Last MLB appearance
- June 10, 1961, for the Pittsburgh Pirates

MLB statistics
- Batting average: .265
- Home runs: 39
- Runs batted in: 227
- Stats at Baseball Reference

Teams
- Kansas City Monarchs (1948–1949); Chicago Cubs (1953–1957); Pittsburgh Pirates (1957–1958, 1960–1961)

Career highlights and awards
- All-Star (1955); World Series champion (1960)
Military career
Allegiance	United States
Branch	United States Navy
Service years	1943–1946

Eugene Walter Baker (June 15, 1925 – December 1, 1999) was an American Major League Baseball infielder who played for the Chicago Cubs and Pittsburgh Pirates during eight seasons between 1953 and 1961, and was selected for the National League team in the 1955 All-Star Game. He threw and batted right-handed, and was listed at 6 feet 1 inch (1.85 m), 170 pounds (77 kg).

== Early life, navy and Negro leagues ==
A native of Davenport, Iowa, Baker starred on the basketball and track teams at Davenport High School, and played sandlot baseball, then went into the United States Navy, being stationed at Ottumwa Naval Air Station and Iowa Pre-Flight School. After his discharge from the Navy, he played for the Kansas City Monarchs of the Negro American League as their regular shortstop during 1948 and 1949.

== Minor leagues ==
In 1950, Baker joined the Cubs' organization, playing briefly at Springfield and Des Moines before joining the Los Angeles Angels, of the Triple-A and Open Classification Pacific Coast League, where he impressed all with his fielding and baserunning. Bobby Bragan, manager of the Angels’ chief rivals, the Hollywood Stars, said Baker was "as good a shortstop as I’ve ever seen – and that includes Pee Wee Reese."

== Major leagues ==
The Cubs purchased Baker's contract and he made his major league debut on September 20, 1953. A few days after acquiring Baker, the Cubs acquired another shortstop, future Hall of Famer Ernie Banks, and moved Baker to second base, perhaps believing he would be able to adapt to a different position more easily than the younger Banks. He primarily played second base for the Cubs and Pirates during eight seasons. He was a reserve infielder for the 1960 World Series champion Pirates and made three pinch-hit appearances during the Series.

== Post-playing career ==
In 1961, Baker became the first African-American manager in Organized Baseball when the Pirates named him skipper of their Batavia Pirates farm club in the New York–Penn League. In 1962, he became the first black coach in Organized Baseball when the Pirates named him player-coach of their Triple-A International League affiliate Columbus Jets. In 1963, the Pirates promoted him to coach on the Major League team. He was the second black coach in the big leagues, following Buck O'Neil by a half-season. He is also credited with being the first black manager in Major League Baseball when he took over for ejected Pirates manager Danny Murtaugh on September 21, 1963. Baker then spent many years as a scout for the Pirates.

== Death ==
He died in Davenport at the age of 74. He is buried in Rock island National Cemetery.

== See also ==
- List of Negro league baseball players who played in Major League Baseball
