= Dwyer Stadium =

Stadium in Batavia, New York, United States

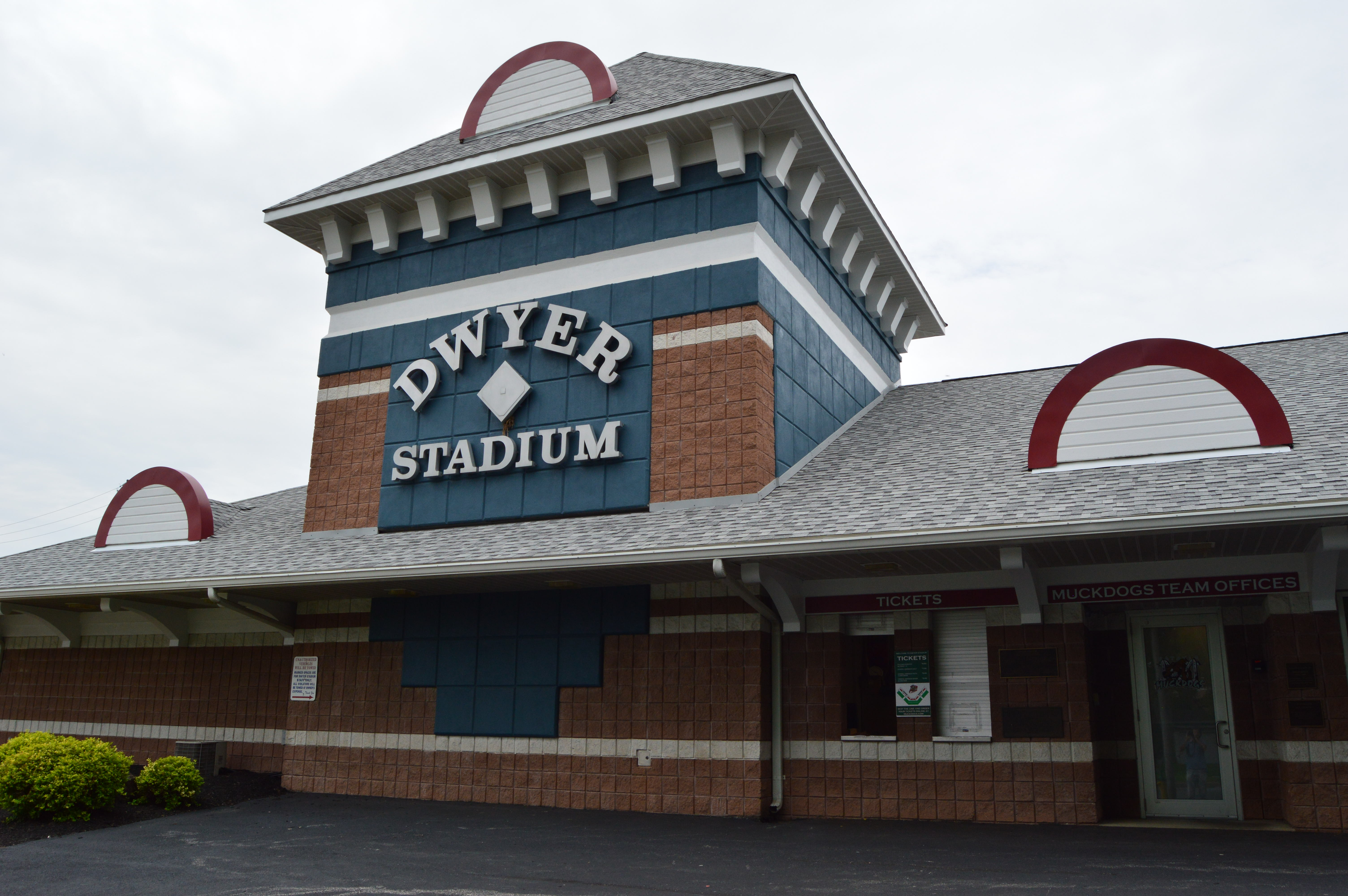
- Exterior of Dwyer Stadium in 2018
- Interactive map of Dwyer Stadium
- Location: 299 Bank Street; Batavia, New York 14020
- Coordinates: 43.009174°N 78.178722°W
- Owner: City of Batavia
- Operator: Genesee County Baseball Club
- Capacity: 2,600
- Surface: Grass
- Field size: Left Field: 325 feet Center Field: 400 feet Right Field: 325 feet

Construction
- Groundbreaking: 1995
- Opened: June 24, 1996
- Cost: $3 million ($6.16 million in 2025 dollars)
- Architect: Highland Associates

Tenants
- Batavia Muckdogs (NYPL/PGCBL) (1996–present); Empire State Yankees (IL) (2012); Genesee Community College Cougars (NJCAA)

Dwyer Stadium is a 2,600 capacity stadium in Batavia, New York, situated in Genesee County. It opened in 1996 replacing the original stadium that was built in 1937, while the playing field is the original. The stadium is currently home to the Batavia Muckdogs of the Perfect Game Collegiate Baseball League, a collegiate summer baseball league; the Genesee Community College Cougars of the National Junior College Athletic Association (NJCAA); and high school teams including the Notre Dame of Batavia Fighting Irish and Batavia Blue Devils.

== History ==
The grandstand and surrounding structure of Dwyer Stadium may be new but the field and area hold over 80 years of professional baseball history. Originally built in 1939 the stadium underwent three names and stood until 1995 when being replaced by the new stadium, keeping the previous name.

=== State Street Park (1939–WWII) ===
State Street Park was built in 1939 and employed 17 local workers to construct. During the first season of play the stadium went unfinished and a snow fence had to be placed for each game to act as the outfield wall while chairs had to be borrowed from a local mortuary for seating. The works project continued through the first season but did not deter fans as 3,000, still a record for Batavia, attended the first game of professional baseball at State Street Park.

=== MacArthur Stadium (WWII–1972) ===
During World War II the name was changed to MacArthur Stadium after General Douglas MacArthur in an act of patriotism.

=== Dwyer Stadium (Original: 1973–1995) ===
Before the 1973 season the stadium found its final name, Dwyer Stadium, after Edward D. Dwyer, a long time team president that was instrumental in keeping the team in Batavia. The stadium was a wooden and covered grandstand that was famous in old time ballparks.

=== Dwyer Stadium (1996–present) ===
In 1995, it was officially announced Batavia would be getting a new $3 million stadium on the same location; the field would remain intact while the grandstand and seating would be torn down and replaced. Auburn and Batavia each got a stadium that were almost carbon copies of one another. The old Dwyer Stadium still has its place in the new stadium as the original Wall of Fame is still present behind the first base bleachers.

== Usage ==
Dwyer Stadium is primarily used for baseball, though has also been home to area youth football as well throughout its history. Dwyer is the home field of the Batavia Muckdogs, a collegiate summer baseball team of the Perfect Game Collegiate Baseball League (PGCBL). The Muckdogs were previously members of Minor League Baseball's New York–Penn League, which was affiliated with Major League Baseball teams. After the cancelled 2020 minor league season, Major League Baseball took direct control of Minor League Baseball and discontinued short-season play. The Muckdogs were not among the teams invited to remain in affiliated baseball. The city received offers to join collegiate summer baseball and semi-professional leagues. In January 2021, the team was purchased by CAN-USA Sports and joined PGCBL for the 2021 season.

During the 2012 season the Triple-A affiliate of the New York Yankees, the Scranton Wilkes-Barre Yankees, were scheduled to play seven games at Dwyer Stadium as the Yankees home stadium PNC Field in Moosic, Pennsylvania underwent renovations. Before the scheduled games the New York Yankees made improvements to the infield and pitchers mound as well as the clubhouse. Due to weather conditions only four Triple-A games were played at Dwyer.

The facility also hosts college games during the spring and fall for the Genesee Community College Cougars as well as local high school games in the spring.
