= New York–Penn League =

American sports league in minor league baseball

- Most recent season or competition: 2019 New York-Penn League season
- Classification: Class A Short Season
- Sport: Baseball
- Founded: 1939; 87 years ago
- Folded: 2020; 6 years ago
- Country: United States, Canada
- Last champion: Brooklyn Cyclones (2019)
- Most titles: Oneonta Yankees (12)

The New York–Penn League (NYPL) was a Minor League Baseball league that operated in the northeastern United States from 1939 to 2020. Classified as a Class A Short Season league, its season started in June, after major-league teams signed their amateur draft picks to professional contracts, and ended in early September.

In 2019, its last season of operation, the NYPL had 14 teams from eight different states. In addition to New York and Pennsylvania, from which the league drew its name, the NYPL also had clubs in Maryland, Massachusetts, Ohio, Vermont, West Virginia, and Connecticut.

The Brooklyn Cyclones were the last NYPL champions, defeating the Lowell Spinners, two games to one, in 2019. The Oneonta Yankees/Tigers won 12 championships, the most among all teams in the league, followed by the Auburn Mets/Twins/Phillies/Doubledays (8) and Jamestown Falcons/Expos (7).

== History ==
The New York–Penn League was founded in 1939 as the Pennsylvania–Ontario–New York League, generally shortened to PONY League, (Note: Not to be confused with PONY Baseball and Softball, a youth sports organization established in Pennsylvania in 1951, or its annual Pony League World Series.) in a hotel in Batavia, New York. The original teams included the Batavia Clippers, Bradford Bees, Hamilton Red Wings, Jamestown Jaguars, Niagara Falls Rainbows, and Olean Oilers; all were based in or near Western New York. The Oilers, a Brooklyn Dodgers affiliate, won both the regular season and playoff championships. Batavia was the last remaining charter city in the league when it ceased operations after the 2020 season.

The Hamilton Red Wings folded early in the 1956 season, and with no more teams in Ontario, the circuit became the New York–Penn League in 1957. The league crossed back into Canada with the formation of the St. Catharines Blue Jays in 1986. They were joined by the Hamilton Redbirds in 1987 and the Welland Pirates in 1989, but all three clubs had moved back to the United States by 2000.

The New York–Penn circuit was originally a Class D league (the minors' lowest classification through 1962). It was a full-season Class A league from 1963 through 1966, and became a short-season Class A league in 1967.

The start of the 2020 season was postponed due to the COVID-19 pandemic before being cancelled on June 30.

=== In popular media ===
Good Enough to Dream is a memoir by renowned baseball writer Roger Kahn, published in 1985. The book chronicles Kahn's experience as the owner of the Utica Blue Sox during the 1983 season. Good Enough to Dream was the recipient of the Casey Award in 1985.

Clubbie is a 2021 memoir by Greg Larson that recounts his experiences as a clubhouse attendant (or "clubbie") for the Aberdeen IronBirds during the 2012 and 2013 seasons. The book's depiction of players' financial struggles is widely credited with inspiring changes to long-standing minor league compensation structures.

=== Disbanding ===
On December 9, 2020, Major League Baseball (MLB) announced its list of 120 teams invited to be a part of the minors after restructuring for the 2021 season. As first reported in 2019, the NYPL ceased operations. The Aberdeen IronBirds, Brooklyn Cyclones, and Hudson Valley Renegades joined the new High-A East, becoming the new High-A affiliates of the Baltimore Orioles, New York Mets, and New York Yankees respectively. The Mahoning Valley Scrappers, State College Spikes, West Virginia Black Bears, and Williamsport Crosscutters moved to the new MLB Draft League for players wishing to showcase themselves to MLB teams in advance of the annual draft. The Tri-City ValleyCats moved to the independent Frontier League, while the Batavia Muckdogs and Auburn Doubledays joined the Perfect Game Collegiate Baseball League. On February 25, 2021, the Vermont Lake Monsters announced that they would join the Futures Collegiate Baseball League (FCBL) under new ownership, and the Norwich Sea Unicorns joined the FCBL in late April. The Staten Island Yankees folded, while the Lowell Spinners were left without future plans and eventually suspended operations for five seasons, and will return as a FCBL expansion team in 2026.

=== Final franchises ===
The league's divisions, at the time it ceased operations, were named in honor of Vincent McNamara, Leo Pinckney, and Robert C. Stedler, each of whom had served as league president.

New York–Penn League teams as of the league's final season (2019)

Division	Team	MLB Affiliation	City	Stadium	Capacity	2021 League
McNamara	Aberdeen IronBirds	Baltimore Orioles	Aberdeen, Maryland	Leidos Field at Ripken Stadium	6,300	High-A East
McNamara	Brooklyn Cyclones	New York Mets	Brooklyn, New York	MCU Park	7,000	High-A East
McNamara	Hudson Valley Renegades	Tampa Bay Rays	Fishkill, New York (Poughkeepsie/Newburgh area)	Dutchess Stadium	4,494	High-A East
McNamara	Staten Island Yankees	New York Yankees	Staten Island, New York	Richmond County Bank Ballpark	7,171	Folded (A replacement team, the Staten Island FerryHawks, joined the Atlantic League in 2022.)
Pinckney	Auburn Doubledays	Washington Nationals	Auburn, New York	Falcon Park	2,800	Perfect Game League (Collegiate baseball)
Pinckney	Batavia Muckdogs	Miami Marlins	Batavia, New York	Dwyer Stadium	2,600	Perfect Game League (Collegiate baseball)
Pinckney	Mahoning Valley Scrappers	Cleveland Indians	Niles, Ohio (Youngstown area)	Eastwood Field	6,000	MLB Draft League (Collegiate baseball)
Pinckney	State College Spikes	St. Louis Cardinals	University Park, Pennsylvania	Medlar Field at Lubrano Park	5,570	MLB Draft League (Collegiate baseball)
Pinckney	West Virginia Black Bears	Pittsburgh Pirates	Granville, West Virginia (Morgantown area)	Monongalia County Ballpark	2,500	MLB Draft League (Collegiate baseball)
Pinckney	Williamsport Crosscutters	Philadelphia Phillies	Williamsport, Pennsylvania	BB&T Ballpark at Historic Bowman Field	2,366	MLB Draft League (Collegiate baseball)
Stedler	Lowell Spinners	Boston Red Sox	Lowell, Massachusetts	Edward A. LeLacheur Park	4,767	Folded (A revived Spinners team was announced in November 2025, set to join the Futures Collegiate Baseball League in 2026.)
Stedler	Norwich Sea Unicorns	Detroit Tigers	Norwich, Connecticut	Senator Thomas J. Dodd Memorial Stadium	6,270	Futures Collegiate Baseball League (Collegiate baseball)
Stedler	Tri-City ValleyCats	Houston Astros	Troy, New York (Capital District)	Joseph L. Bruno Stadium	4,500	Frontier League
Stedler	Vermont Lake Monsters	Oakland Athletics	Burlington, Vermont	Centennial Field	4,400	Futures Collegiate Baseball League (Collegiate baseball)

== Champions ==
League champions were determined by different means during the New York–Penn League's 82-year run from 1939 to 2020. For a few seasons in the 1960s and 1970s, no playoffs were held and the league champions were simply the regular season pennant winners. Most seasons, however, ended with playoffs to determine a league champion.

The Oneonta Tigers won 12 championships, the most among all teams in the league, followed by the Auburn Mets/Twins/Phillies/Doubledays (8) and Jamestown Falcons/Expos (7).

== Teams ==
- Aberdeen IronBirds
- Auburn Americans
- Auburn Astros
- Auburn Doubledays
- Auburn Mets
- Auburn Phillies
- Auburn Red Stars
- Auburn Sunsets
- Auburn Twins
- Auburn Yankees
- Batavia Clippers
- Batavia Indians
- Batavia Muckdogs
- Batavia Pirates
- Batavia Trojans
- Binghamton Triplets
- Bradford Beagles
- Bradford Bees
- Bradford Blue Wings
- Bradford Phillies
- Bradford Yankees
- Brooklyn Cyclones
- Connecticut Tigers
- Corning Athletics
- Corning Cor-Sox
- Corning Independents
- Corning Red Sox
- Corning Royals
- Elmira Pioneers
- Erie Cardinals
- Erie Orioles
- Erie Sailors
- Erie Senators
- Geneva Cubs
- Geneva Pirates
- Geneva Redlegs
- Geneva Senators
- Geneva Twins
- Glens Falls Redbirds
- Hamilton Cardinals
- Hamilton Redbirds
- Hamilton Red Wings
- Hornell Dodgers
- Hornell Maple Leafs
- Hornell Maples
- Hornell Redlegs
- Hudson Valley Renegades
- Jamestown Braves
- Jamestown Dodgers
- Jamestown Expos
- Jamestown Falcons
- Jamestown Jaguars
- Jamestown Jammers
- Jamestown Tigers
- Little Falls Mets
- Lockport Cubs
- Lockport Reds
- Lockport White Socks
- Lockport White Sox
- London Pirates
- Lowell Spinners
- Mahoning Valley Scrappers
- New Jersey Cardinals
- Newark Co-Pilots
- Newark Orioles
- Niagara Falls Pirates
- Niagara Falls Rainbows
- Niagara Falls Rapids
- Niagara Falls Sox
- Olean A's
- Olean Giants
- Olean Oilers
- Olean Red Sox
- Olean Yankees
- Oneonta Red Sox
- Oneonta Tigers
- Oneonta Yankees
- Pittsfield Astros
- Pittsfield Mets
- Queens Kings
- St. Catharines Blue Jays
- St. Catharines Stompers
- State College Spikes
- Staten Island Yankees
- Tri-City ValleyCats
- Utica Blue Jays
- Utica Blue Sox
- Vermont Expos
- Vermont Lake Monsters
- Watertown Indians
- Watertown Pirates
- Welland Pirates
- Wellsville Braves
- Wellsville Nitros
- Wellsville Red Sox
- Wellsville Rockets
- Wellsville Senators
- Wellsville Yankees
- West Virginia Black Bears
- Williamsport Astros
- Williamsport Crosscutters
- Williamsport Cubs
- Williamsport Red Sox
- York White Roses

=== Cities represented ===
Connecticut

- Norwich: 2010–2020 (16 seasons)

Maryland

- Aberdeen: 2002–2020 (19 seasons)

Massachusetts

- Lowell: 1996–2020 (25 seasons)
- Pittsfield: 1989–2001 (13 seasons)

New Jersey

- Augusta: 1994–2005 (12 seasons)

New York

- Auburn: 1958–1980, 1982–2020 (62 seasons)
- Batavia: 1939–1953, 1957–1959, 1961–2020 (78 seasons)
- Binghamton: 1964–1966 (3 seasons)
- Brooklyn: 2001–2020 (20 seasons)
- Corning: 1951–1960, 1968–1969 (12 seasons)
- Elmira: 1957–1961, 1973–1995 (28 seasons)
- Fishkill: 1994–2020 (26 seasons)
- Geneva: 1958–1973, 1977–1993 (33 seasons)
- Glens Falls: 1993 (1 season)
- Jamestown: 1939–1957, 1962–1973, 1977–2014 (67 seasons)
- Hornell: 1942–1957 (16 seasons)
- Little Falls: 1977–1988 (12 seasons)
- Lockport: 1942–1950 (9 seasons)
- Newark: 1968–1979, 1983–1987 (17 seasons)
- Niagara Falls: 1939–1940, 1970–1979, 1982–1985, 1989–1993 (21 seasons)
- Olean: 1939–1959, 1961–1966 (27 seasons)
- Oneonta: 1966–2009 (44 seasons)
- Queens: 2000 (1 season)
- Staten Island: 1999–2020 (22 seasons)
- Troy: 2002–2020 (18 seasons)
- Utica: 1977–2001 (25 seasons)
- Watertown: 1983–1998 (16 seasons)
- Wellsville: 1942–1961, 1963–1965 (23 seasons)

Ohio

- Youngstown: 1999–2020 (22 seasons)

Pennsylvania

- Bradford: 1939–1942, 1944–1957 (18 seasons)
- Erie: 1954–1963, 1967, 1981–1993, 1995–1998 (28 seasons)
- State College: 2006–2020 (15 seasons)
- Williamsport: 1968–1972, 1994–2020 (32 seasons)
- York: 1923–1933, 1936 (moved to Trenton July 2) (12 seasons)

Vermont

- Burlington: 1994–2020 (27 seasons)

West Virginia

- Morgantown: 2015–2020 (6 seasons)

Ontario

- Hamilton: 1939–1942, 1946–1956, 1988–1992 (20 seasons)
- London: 1940–1942 (2 seasons)
- St. Catharines: 1986–1999 (14 seasons)
- Welland: 1989–1994 (5 seasons)

== Hall of Fame ==
The New York–Penn League Hall of Fame was established in 2012 to honor league players, managers, and executives for their accomplishments or contributions to the league in playing or administrative roles. The Hall of Fame inducted its first class of seven men in 2012. New members were elected before the start of each season.
