= Hamilton Red Wings (baseball) =

- 1939–1956; (1939–1942, 1946-56); Hamilton, Ontario

Minor league affiliations
- Previous classes: Short-Season A
- Previous leagues: PONY League

Major league affiliations
- Previous teams: St. Louis Cardinals (1939–1942, 1946–1955)

Minor league titles
- League titles: 1 (1955)

Team data
- Previous names: Hamilton Red Wings (1956); Hamilton Cardinals (1946–1955); Hamilton Red Wings (1939–1942)

The Hamilton Red Wings were a minor league baseball team based in Hamilton, Ontario. The team was a charter member of the Pennsylvania–Ontario–New York League (PONY League), which rebranded as the New York–Penn League upon the demise of the Hamilton franchise; Hamilton played within the league during the team's entire existence.

The club was founded in 1939 and was associated with the St. Louis Cardinals of the National League through the 1955 season. After missing three seasons during World War II, the franchise changed its name to the Hamilton Cardinals. In 1955, the Cardinals won the league championship. The team then reverted to the Hamilton Red Wings name for the 1956 season. However, in May, the Red Wings disbanded. Hamilton did not have another minor league baseball team until 1988, when the Hamilton Redbirds began play.

== Year-by-year record ==
Year	Record	Finish	Manager	Notes
1939	61-44	2nd	Don Hurst	Lost League Finals
1940	47-53	4th	Fred Lucas	Lost in 1st round
1941	50-57	4th	Roy Pfleger	Lost League Finals
1942	36-90	8th	Roy Pfleger / Ken Blackman / Joe Sugden	
1946	53-73	5th	John Newman	
1947	49-76	7th	John Newman	
1948	73-52	3rd	George Kissell	Lost in 1st round
1949	75-50	3rd	George Kissell	Lost League Finals
1950	68-57	3rd	Vedie Himsl	Lost in 1st round
1951	66-60	4th	Vedie Himsl	Lost in 1st round
1952	83-43	1st	Harold Contini	Lost in 1st round
1953	69-57	3rd	Harold Contini	Lost League Finals
1954	61-65	6th	Jimmy Brown	
1955	82-43	1st	Ed Lyons	League Champs
1956	6-8	--	Cart Howerton	Team disbanded May 18
