= Staten Island Yankees =

- 1999–2020; Staten Island, New York
Team logo
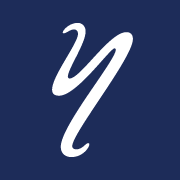
Cap insignia

Minor league affiliations
- Class: Short-Season A (1999–2020)
- League: New York–Penn League (1999–2020)

Major league affiliations
- Team: New York Yankees (1999–2020)

Minor league titles
- League titles (6): 2000; 2002; 2005; 2006; 2009; 2011
- Division titles (9): 2000; 2002; 2005; 2006; 2008; 2009; 2011; 2015; 2017

Team data
- Name: Staten Island Yankees (1999–2020)
- Colors: Midnight navy, white
- Ballpark: Richmond County Bank Ballpark (2001–2020); College of Staten Island Baseball Complex (1999–2000)

The Staten Island Yankees were a minor league baseball team located in the New York City borough of Staten Island from 1999 to 2020. Nicknamed the "Baby Bombers", the Yankees were the Class A Short Season affiliate of the New York Yankees and played in the New York–Penn League at Richmond County Bank Ballpark along the waterfront in St. George. The Yankees won six New York–Penn League championships (2000, 2002, 2005, 2006, 2009, and 2011).

== History ==
The franchise originated in 1983 as the Watertown Pirates (affiliated with the Pittsburgh Pirates), and became the Watertown Indians (affiliated with the Cleveland Indians) in 1989.

In 1999, in a deal brokered by New York City Mayor Rudy Giuliani, the Yankees affiliation was transferred from the Oneonta Yankees to the Watertown franchise, which was relocated and renamed the Staten Island Yankees. The Oneonta Yankees, in turn, became a Detroit Tigers affiliate and were renamed the Oneonta Tigers.

The Staten Island Yankees played their first two seasons at College of Staten Island Baseball Complex before moving into the Richmond County Bank Ballpark for the 2001 season.

The first SI Yankee to reach the major leagues as a New York Yankee was in 2003; pitcher Jason Anderson, pitching in relief in an 8–4 Yankee win over the Toronto Blue Jays at the Rogers Centre. (The first Staten Island Yankee to reach the majors for any team was Wily Mo Peña, who broke in with the Cincinnati Reds, in 2002.)

On March 26, 2006, the Staten Island Advance reported that the team's majority owners, the Getzler family, were considering selling their 51% share of the team, and were asking for between three and five million dollars. The New York Yankees purchased the Getzlers’ interest in the team and in return hired Mandalay Sports Properties to run the day-to-day operations of the team. Part of the agreement was that the New York Yankees and Mandalay become equal partners with Mandalay owning 50% of the Staten Island Yankees.

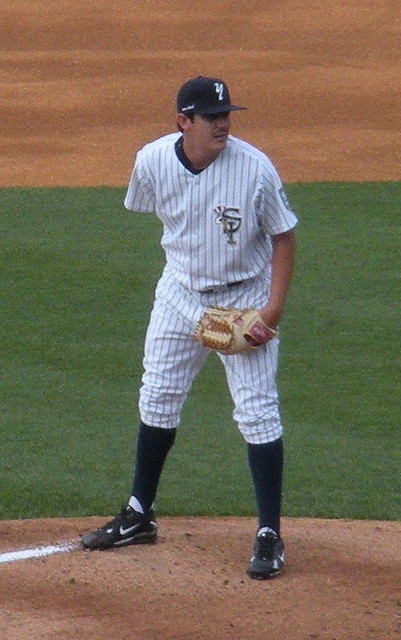
Tyler Romeo pitching for the Staten Island Yankees in 2008.

In 2006, the Yankees were managed by Gaylen Pitts, noted for frequently being ejected from games. In a game on August 25, 2006, Pitts was ejected and then returned to the field in sandals after a batter was hit by a pitch in the 9th inning of a 21–6 victory over the Brooklyn Cyclones.

In 2007, the Yankees were managed by Mike Gillespie, who had led the 1998 USC Trojans to a College World Series championship. Gillespie led the Baby Bombers to their third consecutive playoff appearance before losing to the Brooklyn Cyclones in 2007 NYPL Playoffs, 2 games to none.

Former Florida Gator coach Pat McMahon managed the Yankees for the 2008 season.

Former major league catcher Josh Paul managed the Yankees for the 2009 and 2010 seasons. in 2010, due to Dave Eiland taking a leave of absence, SI Yankees manager Paul was summoned to fill in as the New York Yankees bullpen coach, during which time former major leaguer Jody Reed filled in as the interim manager for the Staten Island Yankees.

On June 20, 2016, the team launched a campaign to rename the organization starting with the 2017 season. On September 8, 2016, the potential names were whittled down to five, with an online vote beginning on the team's website from that date; the candidate names were the Bridge Trolls, Heroes, Killer Bees, Pizza Rats, and Rock Pigeons. Ultimately, the team decided to retain the Yankees moniker but to call itself the Staten Island Pizza Rats for select games as an alternate identity.

Prior to the 2020 season, it was announced that the team would be shuttered when the MLB/MiLB agreement ended at the conclusion of the 2020 season under a proposed plan calling for the Short Season Class A designation to be eliminated. The start of the 2020 season was postponed due to the COVID-19 pandemic before ultimately being cancelled on June 30. On November 7, 2020, the New York Yankees announced that they were withdrawing from Staten Island as well as abandoning their affiliation with the Trenton Thunder as they were moving forward with their new Double-A affiliate: the Somerset Patriots, but they would seek to place a team from the independent Atlantic League at Richmond County Bank Ballpark in 2021. On December 3, 2020, the Staten Island Yankees announced that the club would cease operations. The Staten Island FerryHawks began play in the Atlantic League in 2022.

== Year-by-year record ==
Year	Record	Finish	Manager	Playoffs
1999	39–35	7th	Joe Arnold	None, did not qualify
2000	46–28	2nd	Joe Arnold	League Champs
2001	48–28	3rd	Dave Jorn	Lost in 1st round
2002	48–26	1st	Derek Shelton	League Champs
2003	29–43	11th	Andy Stankiewicz	None, did not qualify
2004	28–44	13th	Tommy John	None, did not qualify
2005	52–24	1st	Andy Stankiewicz	League Champs
2006	45–29	1st	Gaylen Pitts	League Champs
2007	47–28	2nd	Mike Gillespie	Lost in 1st round
2008	49–26	1st	Pat McMahon	Lost in 1st round
2009	47–29	2nd	Josh Paul	League Champs
2010	34–40	4th	Josh Paul and Jody Reed	None, did not qualify
2011	45–28	1st	Tom Slater	League Champs
2012	30–45	4th	Justin Pope	None, did not qualify
2013	34–41	4th	Justin Pope	None, did not qualify
2014	37–38	3rd	Mario Garza	None, did not qualify
2015	41–34	1st	Pat Osborn	Lost in Finals (West Virginia)
2016	44–31	2nd	Dave Bialas	Lost in 1st round (State College)
2017	46–29	1st	Julio Mosquera	Lost in 1st round (Hudson Valley)
2018	37–36	3rd	Lino Diaz	None, did not qualify
2019	40–36	4th	David Adams	None, did not qualify

== Notable alumni ==
Over a hundred Staten Island Yankees players reached the major leagues, not including MLB players who were with the team on a rehab assignment.

- Manny Acosta
- Jason Anderson
- John Axford
- TJ Beam
- Colter Bean
- Justin Berg
- Danny Burawa
- Melky Cabrera
- Andy Cannizaro
- Robinson Canó
- Matt Carson
- Bernie Castro
- Francisco Cervelli
- Justin Christian
- Brandon Claussen
- Phil Coke
- Matt DeSalvo
- Shelley Duncan
- Michael Dunn
- Anderson Garcia
- Brett Gardner
- Alex Graman
- John-Ford Griffin
- Eric Hacker
- Brad Halsey
- Sean Henn
- Mitch Jones
- Jeff Karstens
- Ian Kennedy
- Charlie Manning
- Daniel McCutchen
- Mark Melancon
- Wily Mo Pena
- David Phelps
- Andy Phillips
- Omir Santos
- Bronson Sardinha
- Matt Smith
- Chien-Ming Wang
- Chase Wright

The following MLB players made rehab appearances with the Staten Island Yankees:

- Orlando Hernandez (2001)
- José Contreras (2003)
- Kevin Brown (2004)
- Steve Karsay (2004)
- Felix Rodríguez (2005)
- Octavio Dotel (2006)
- Jeff Karstens (2007) – the only former SI Yankee to return on an MLB rehab assignment
- Darrell Rasner (2007)
- Jonathan Albaladejo (2008)
- Phil Hughes (2011)

== Mascots ==
The original Staten Island Yankees Mascot was Scooter the "Holy Cow." A combination of the nickname of former New York Yankees shortstop and broadcaster Phil "Scooter" Rizzuto and his commentating catch phrase "Holy Cow!" Scooter debuted for the Staten Island Yankees when the franchise relocated from Watertown, New York, in 1999. In summer 2003, the Baby Bombers debuted Scooter's sisters Red and Huckleberry (or "Huck"). Scooter and his sisters were a staple at SI Yankee games, leading fan rallies and between-inning on-field games. The cows were known to have a The Three Stooges-like relationship in which Red and Huck often teamed up to trick and trap Scooter

== Retired numbers ==
- 6: Brett Gardner
- 17: Robinson Canó
- 19: Jason Anderson
- 41: Chien-Ming Wang
- 42: Jackie Robinson
