= Jamestown Expos =

- 1939–1993; (1939–1957, 1961–1973, 1977–1993); Jamestown, New York

Minor league affiliations
- Previous classes: Short Season A (1967–1993); Class A (1963–1966); Class D (1939–1962)
- League: New York–Penn League (1957–1993)
- Previous leagues: Pennsylvania–Ontario–New York League (1939–1956)

Major league affiliations
- Previous teams: Montreal Expos (1971–1973, 1977–1993); Boston Red Sox (1968–1970); Atlanta Braves (1967); Los Angeles Dodgers (1966); Detroit Tigers (1961–1965); Pittsburgh Pirates (1957); Detroit Tigers (1944–1956); St. Louis Cardinals (1943); Detroit Tigers (1941–1942); Pittsburgh Pirates (1939)

Minor league titles
- League titles: 7 (1942, 1944, 1947, 1952, 1953, 1989, 1991)

Team data
- Previous names: Jamestown Expos (1973, 1977–1993); Jamestown Falcons (1968–1972); Jamestown Braves (1967); Jamestown Dodgers (1966); Jamestown Tigers (1961–1965); Jamestown Falcons (1940–1957); Jamestown Jaguars (1939)
- Mascot: Yuppi (1989–1993); Yippee (1983–1988)
- Previous parks: Russell Diethrick Park; Celoron Park (1939)

The Jamestown Expos were a minor league baseball franchise located in Jamestown, New York. The team existed under various names from 1939 through 1993 and played in the New York–Penn League and its predecessor, the Pennsylvania–Ontario–New York League.

== Jamestown Falcons ==
The first team, in 1939, was known as the Jamestown Jaguars, a Pittsburgh Pirates affiliate, but it folded after only one year. On July 13, 1940, the Niagara Falls Rainbows moved to Jamestown and became the Jamestown Falcons.

The Falcons played from 1939 to 1957. They played in the Pennsylvania–Ontario–New York League (PONY League) from 1940 to 1956, and in the New York–Penn League in 1957. They were affiliated with the Detroit Tigers from 1941 to 1942 and from 1944 to 1956. In 1943, they were affiliated with the St. Louis Cardinals. They were affiliated with the Pittsburgh Pirates in 1957. The team reformed in 1961 after a 3-year absence. They were called the Jamestown Tigers from 1961 to 1965, the Jamestown Dodgers in 1966 and the Jamestown Braves in 1967 (reflecting their affiliations with the Tigers, Los Angeles Dodgers and Atlanta Braves respectively) before returning to the Falcons name from 1968 to 1972.

Ollie Carnegie was the team's manager during the 1944 season.

From 1941 onward, they played their home games at Jamestown Municipal Stadium, now known as Russell Dietrick Park.

== Montreal Expos affiliate ==
The team was known as the Jamestown Expos from 1977 to 1993, although Jamestown was affiliated with Montreal in 1970 and 1971, at the time the team was called the Falcons. Major League pitcher Randy Johnson began his career with the Expos in 1985.

In 1990, the television show Candid Camera planned to do a segment of minor league baseball. After consulting the front office in Montreal, Candid Camera came to Jamestown to do a prank on pitcher Bob Baxter. Only the visiting team manager, the catcher for the Expos and the other umpires knew about the prank. Host Peter Funt played as the umpire, as the catcher gave fake signals to pitcher Baxter.

The Expos were relocated to Vermont after the 1993 season, eventually becoming the Vermont Lake Monsters. However, the New York–Penn League maintained a presence in Jamestown, immediately relocating the Niagara Falls Rapids to Jamestown in 1994 and naming that team the Jamestown Jammers. The Jammers would last in Jamestown until the end of the 2014 season, at which point the New York–Penn League left Jamestown permanently.

== Notable alumni (1939–1993) ==
=== Hall of Fame alumni ===
- Nellie Fox (1944) Inducted, 1997
- Randy Johnson (1985) Inducted, 2015
- Jim Leyland (1965) 3x MLB Manager of the Year (1990, 1992, 2006); Manager: 1997 World Series Champion Florida Marlins Inducted, 2024

=== Notable alumni ===
- Antonio Alfonseca (1993) 2000 NL Saves Leader
- Tim Blackwell (1970)
- Mike Blowers (1986)
- Frank Bolling (1951) 4x MLB All-Star
- Donn Clendenon (1957) 1969 World Series Most Valuable Player
- Francisco Cordero (1995–1996) 3x MLB All-Star
- Wil Cordero (1988) MLB All-Star
- Cecil Cooper (1968) 5x MLB All-Star
- Delino DeShields (1987)
- Pat Dobson (1963) MLB-All Star
- Dwight Evans (1969) 8x Gold Glove; 3x MLB All-Star
- Andres Galarraga (1981) 5x MLB All-Star; 1993 NL Batting Title
- Joe Ginsberg (1944)
- Marquis Grissom (1988) 2x MLB All-Star
- Mark Grudzielanek (1991) MLB All-Star
- John Hiller (1963) MLB All-Star
- Julián Javier (1957) 2x MLB All-Star
- Jackie Jensen (1970) 3x MLB All-Star; 1958 AL Most Valuable Player
- Gabe Kapler (1995)
- Frank Lary (1950) 3x MLB All-Star
- Charley Lau (1950)
- Danny Litwhiler (1954) MLB All-Star
- Sal Maglie (1940) 2x MLB All-Star
- Pat Mullin (1956) 2x MLB All-Star
- Ben Oglivie (1968) 1980 AL HR Leader; 3x MLB All-Star
- Stubby Overmire (1962–1963)
- Larry Parrish (1972) 2x MLB All-Star
- Tony Phillips (1978)
- Phil Regan (1956) MLB-All Star
- Buck Rodgers (1956) 1997 NL Manager of the Year
- Gary Roenicke (1973)
- Jim Rooker (1961–1962)
- Tony Scott (1971)
- Bob Shaw (1953) MLB All-Star
- Matt Stairs (1989)
- John Vander Wal (1987)
