= Wellsville Red Sox =

- 1942–1965; Wellsville, New York

Minor league affiliations
- Previous classes: Class A (1963–1965); Class D (1942–1962)
- Previous leagues: New York–Pennsylvania League (1957–1965); Pennsylvania–Ontario–New York League (1942–1956)

Major league affiliations
- Previous teams: Boston Red Sox (1963–1965); Milwaukee Braves (1953–1961); St. Louis Browns (1952); Washington Senators (1950); Boston Red Sox (1947–1948); New York Yankees (1942–1946)

Minor league titles
- League titles: 4 (1943, 1956, 1959, 1960)

Team data
- Previous names: Wellsville Red Sox (1963–1965); Wellsville Braves (1953–1961); Wellsville Rockets (1951–1952); Wellsville Senators (1950); Wellsville Nitros (1947–1949); Wellsville Yankees (1942–1946)
- Previous parks: Tuller Field

The Wellsville Red Sox were a minor league baseball team, based in Wellsville, New York. The team played in the Pennsylvania–Ontario–New York League, which remained in existence as the New York–Penn League until ceasing operations in 2020.

== History ==
The team began as the Wellsville Yankees, a class C affiliate of the New York Yankees from 1942 through 1946. In 1943, the team won its first league title. After the 1946 season the Yankees ended their affiliation and were replaced by the Boston Red Sox and the team was renamed the Wellsville Nitros. The Nitros were kept their affiliation with Boston until 1949. However, for the 1949 season, the club continued to play as the Nitros.

In 1950 the Nitros changed their name to the Wellsville Senators when they became a farm team of the Charlotte Hornets in the Washington Senators' farm system. The team became the independent Wellsville Rockets in 1951 when their one-year affiliation with the Senators ended. In 1952, the Rockets were affiliated with the St. Louis Browns, before becoming the Wellsville Braves, an affiliate of the Milwaukee Braves. During their time as the Braves the team, won 3 league titles; in 1956, 1959, and 1960. In 1963, the team once again became an affiliate of the Boston Red Sox and took up the Wellsville Red Sox name. In 1966, the Red Sox moved the team from Wellsville to Oneonta, New York, under the ownership of Sam Nader the team became the Oneonta Red Sox. The club played in Oneonta until 2010, when they were relocated to Norwich, Connecticut, and continue to play as the Connecticut Tigers.

== Year-by-year record ==
Year	Record	Finish	Manager	Notes
1942	65-60	T4th	Walt VanGrofski	Lost 1 game playoff for 4th place
1943	58-51	3rd	Herb Brett & Sol Mishkin	League champs
1944	51-73	7th	Sol Mishkin	
1945	57-68	5th	Bob Crow & Sol Mishkin	
1946	52-72	6th	Joe Abreu	
1947	64-59	4th	Tom Carey	Lost in 1st round
1948	60-64	6th	Tom Carey	
1949	45-81	7th	Tom Kister & Jimmy Wasdell	
1950	50-75	7th	Jimmy Wasdell & Bill Mongiello	
1951	53-73	6th	Walt VanGrofski	
1952	36-89	8th	Gene Crumling & Rocco Sgro	
1953	59-67	6th	Ted Sepkowski	
1954	69-56	3rd	Ted Sepkowski	Lost in 1st round
1955	68-58	4th	Alex Monchak	Lost in 1st round
1956	74-46	1st	Alex Monchak	League Champs
1957	74-43	1st	Alex Monchak	Lost in 1st round
1958	70-56	1st	Harry Minor	Lost League Finals
1959	80-46	1st	Harry Minor	League Champs
1960	69-60	2nd	Harry Minor	League Champs
1961	55-71	7th	Bill Steinecke	
1963	73-57	2nd	Bill Slack & Matt Sczesny	Lost in 1st round
1964	70-60	3rd	Larry Thomas	
1965	62-64	4th	Matt Sczesny	

== Notable alumni ==
=== Hall of Fame alumni ===
- Phil Niekro (1959) Inducted, 1997

=== Notable alumni ===
- Jerry Coleman (1942) MLB All-Star
- Tony Conigliaro (1963) MLB All-Star
- Elrod Hendricks (1960)
- Dick Littlefield (1947)
- Charlie Maxwell (1947) 2 x MLB All-Star
- Don McMahon (1950) MLB All-Star
- Don Nottebart (1954)
- Bill Robinson (1961)
- George Scott (1963) 8 X Gold Glove; 3 x MLB All-Star
- Jimmy Wasdell (1949-1950)
