= Niagara Falls Rapids =

- 1989–1993; (1970–1979, 1982–1985, 1989–1993); Niagara Falls, New York

Minor league affiliations
- Previous classes: Short-Season A
- League: New York–Penn League
- Division: Stedler Division (1989–1993); West Division (1982–1985); Wrigley Division (1978–1979); West Division (1977)

Major league affiliations
- Previous teams: Detroit Tigers (1989–1993); Chicago White Sox (1982–1985); Pittsburgh Pirates (1970–1978)

Minor league titles
- League titles: 2 (1982, 1993)
- Division titles: 1 (1982)

Team data
- Previous names: Niagara Falls Rapids (1989–1993); Niagara Falls Sox (1982–1985); Niagara Falls Pirates (1970–1979)
- Previous parks: Sal Maglie Stadium

The Niagara Falls Rapids were a Class-A minor league baseball team located in Niagara Falls, New York. The team played in the New York–Penn League throughout its existence. The team played all of their home games at Sal Maglie Stadium.

The team began in 1970 as the Niagara Falls Pirates, and were affiliated with the Pittsburgh Pirates until 1977. In 1982, the team became affiliated with the Chicago White Sox and took up the new name the Niagara Falls Sox. The affiliation with the White Sox would last until 1985. Then after a four-year hiatus the team was reestablished and affiliated with the Detroit Tigers under the Rapids name. However, in 1993 the team relocated to Jamestown, New York, and became the Jamestown Jammers.

== Notable alumni ==
- Dale Berra (1975)
- John Cangelosi (1982)
- Tony Clark (1992) 2001 MLB All-Star
- Terry Collins (1971)
- Chuck Cottier (1971–1972)
- Miguel Dilone (1972)
- Doug Drabek (1983) 1994 MLB All-Star; 1990 NL Cy Young Award
- Steve Farr (1977)
- Bobby Higginson (1992)
- Al Holland (1975) 1984 MLB All-Star
- Rick Honeycutt (1976) 2x MLB All-Star; 1983 AL ERA Leader
- Odell Jones (1972)
- Brian Moehler (1993)
- Omar Moreno (1970, 1972) 2x NL Stolen Base Leader
- Ed Ott (1970)
- Larry Parrish (1992–1993) 2x MLB All-Star (1979, 1987)
- Aurelio Rodriguez (1990)
- Luis Salazar (1976)
- Rod Scurry (1974)
- Bobby Thigpen (1985) 1990 MLB All-Star
- Randy Velarde (1985)
- Category:Niagara Falls Pirates players
- Category:Niagara Falls Rapids players
- Category:Niagara Falls Sox players
