= Batavia Muckdogs =

Collegiate summer baseball team in New York, US

- Founded in 1939; Batavia, New York
Team logo
Cap insignia

Minor league affiliations
- Class: Collegiate summer baseball
- Previous classes: Short-Season A (1967-2020); Class A (1963-1966); Class D (1939-1962)
- League: PGCBL (2021–present)
- Division: West Division
- Previous leagues: New York–Penn League (1957–1959, 1961–2020); P.O.N.Y. (Pennsylvania-Ontario-New York) (1939–1953)

Major league affiliations
- Previous teams: Miami Marlins (2013–2020); St. Louis Cardinals (2007–2012); Philadelphia Phillies (1988–2006, 1967); Co-op (1987, 1975, 1966); Cleveland Indians (1976–1986, 1957–1959, 1942–1951); New York Mets (1972–1974); Detroit Tigers (1968–1971); Pittsburgh Pirates (1961–1965, 1952–1953)

Minor league titles
- League titles: (P.O.N.Y): 1945, 1946 (NYPL): 1963, 2008 (PGCBL): 2026
- Division titles: (NYPL): 1977, 1995, 1998, 2008, 2010, 2019 (PGCBL): 2022, 2023, 2024, 2025, 2026

Team data
- Name: Batavia Muckdogs (1998–present)
- Previous names: Batavia Clippers (1939–1953, 1988–1997); Batavia Trojans (1966–1987); Batavia Pirates (1961–1965); Batavia Indians (1957–1959)
- Mascot: Dewey
- Ballpark: Dwyer Stadium
- Previous parks: Dwyer Stadium - formerly State Street Park, MacArthur Park - Opened July 27, 1938 - Demolished 1996.
- Owner/ Operator: CAN-USA Sports
- General manager: Marc Witt
- Manager: Joey "Skipp" Martinez (2021–present)
- Website: canusamuckdogs.com

The Batavia Muckdogs are a collegiate summer baseball team in the Perfect Game Collegiate Baseball League (PGCBL). They are located in Batavia, a city in Genesee County, New York, United States. Their home field is Dwyer Stadium in the city of Batavia, built after the 1996 season to replace the original Dwyer Stadium (formerly State Street Park, MacArthur Stadium) that opened July 27, 1938 as home to the Batavia Bees, a semi-pro team in the Genesee County League.

Off and on from 1939 to 2020, they were members of Minor League Baseball's New York–Penn League (NYPL). With Major League Baseball's reorganization of the minor leagues after the 2020 season, Batavia and the New York-Penn League were eliminated from affiliated baseball. The Muckdogs later joined PGCBL for the 2021 season.

== History ==
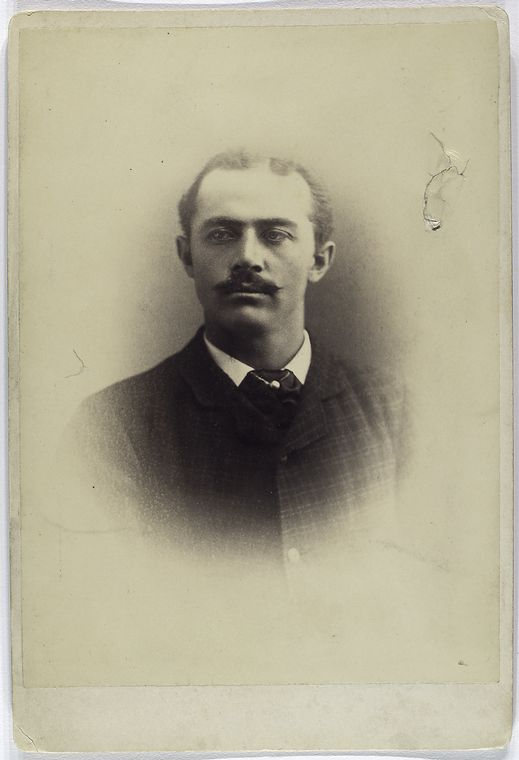
Joe Hornung was player/manager for the Batavia Giants in 1897.

Prior to the current Batavia franchise, professional baseball in the city dates back to 1897 when Batavia played in the New York State League. The Batavia Giants, sometimes referred to as the Reds because of their crimsons uniforms, were the first classified team in the city making their debut - after some rainouts - on May 14, 1897, against the Auburn franchise at a stadium built on Swan Street; future major leaguer Jack Burns batted third and played shortstop. After a rough start to the season, where the team lost their first 9 games, the team released eight players and fired manager Martin Earley. J.J. Benner took over the club as team captain and acting manager, however play did not improve and he was replaced by former major leaguer Joe Hornung who was named player-manager on May 24, he made his debut in the lineup on June 14 at 40 years old, going hitless. After 20 games the team sat at 4–16 and had money troubles where local fans would not pay the 10 cent admission, Hornung left the team on July 9. It was announced on July 24 that the team would move to Geneva, by July 25 the team had left Batavia and become the Geneva Alhambras. That season the Class-C New York State League also consisted of teams in Canandaigua, Cortland, Lyons, Palmyra, and Auburn.

As was common across the country at the time, Batavia hosted several semi-professional baseball leagues both before and after the departure of the Giants. These included the Western New York League, which featured teams from nearby Le Roy, Perry, and Warsaw. The Batavia Bees were the prominent semi-professional team in the area prior to the return of professional baseball in 1939. The Bees continued to play even after the arrival of the Clippers.

The history of the New York–Penn League originated in Batavia as the league, then known as the Pennsylvania–Ontario–New York League (PONY League), was formed in a local hotel that has since been demolished. Original league cities included Batavia, Bradford, Hamilton, Jamestown, Niagara Falls, and Olean.

The Muckdogs were founded in 1939 as the Batavia Clippers, however the team was not in operation during the 1954–56 and 1960 seasons after dropping out of the league for financial reasons. During the 1957 through 1959 seasons the team was known as the Batavia Indians, upon their final return to the league in 1961 the team was known as the Batavia Pirates until changing their name to the Batavia Trojans in 1966 until 1987.

From 1988 through the 1997 season the team brought back the historic Batavia Clippers name before changing to the Muckdogs in 1998 based on a fan poll that chose the nickname and logo. The "Muckdogs" name was inspired by Genesee County's mucklands. Batavia celebrated their 80th anniversary during the 2019 seasons as the only founding member of the league still in existence.

The Muckdogs franchise was surrendered to the league prior to the 2018 season. The team was then operated as a ward of the league.

After the cancelled 2020 minor league season, Major League Baseball took direct control of Minor League Baseball and discontinued short-season play. The Muckdogs were not among the teams invited to remain in affiliated baseball. The city received offers from collegiate summer baseball and semi-professional leagues for 2021. After being purchased by CAN-USA Sports, the Muckdogs joined Perfect Game Collegiate Baseball League, a collegiate summer league, for 2021.

== Logo and mascot ==
The Muckdogs logo adopted in 1998 is a dog on a crushed fence in the shape of an "M" surrounded by muck with baseballs on either side. The team also has an alternate logo of a B with a dog.

The Muckdogs currently have one mascot, Dewey, however had three mascots who would make appearances throughout the season at Dwyer Stadium in recent years. The team's original mascot Maxwell T. Chomper, Homer and Slider.

== Season-by-season record ==
Batavia Muckdogs of the Perfect Game Collegiate Baseball League
Year	Regular season			Postseason		
Year	Record	Win %	Finish	Record	Win %	Result
2026	29–10–1	.738	League champions	3-0	.1000	Defeated Auburn in first round; Jamestown in second round; Utica in Finals
2025	31–13–1	.705	West Division champions	2-2	.500	Defeated Auburn in first round; Jamestown in second round; Lost to Saugerties in Finals
2024	34–8	.810	West Division champions	1-1	.500	Defeated Jamestown in first round; Lost to Elmira in second round
2023	27–16	.628	West Division champions	0-1	.000	Lost to Auburn in first round
2022	30–15	.667	West Division champions	3-2	.600	Defeated Elmira in first round; Utica in second round; Lost to Amsterdam in Finals
2021	22–19	.537	3rd West Division			DNQ

Batavia Muckdogs of the New York–Penn League
Year	Regular season			Postseason			
Year	Record	Win %	Finish	Record	Win %	Result	MLB
2020	--	--	--	--	--	Minor League Baseball cancelled due to COVID-19 Pandemic	Marlins
2019	41–35	.539	Pinckney Division champions	1–2	.333	Lost to Lowell in Semi-Finals	Marlins
2018	36–40	.474	3rd Pinckney Division			DNQ	Marlins
2017	30–45	.400	6th Pinckney Division			DNQ	Marlins
2016	22–53	.293	6th Pinckney Division			DNQ	Marlins
2015	31–44	.413	5th Pinckney Division			DNQ	Marlins
2014	34–42	.447	4th Pinckney Division			DNQ	Marlins
2013	39–36	.520	3rd Pinckney Division			DNQ	Marlins
2012	44–32	.579	2nd Pinckney Division			DNQ	Cardinals
2011	37–38	.493	4th Pinckney Division			DNQ	Cardinals
2010	45–29	.608	Pinckney Division champions	1–2	.333	Lost to Tri-City in Semi-Finals	Cardinals
2009	37–39	.487	4th Pinckney Division			DNQ	Cardinals
2008	46–28	.622	Pinckney Division champions	4–1	.800	Defeated Lowell in semi-finals; Jamestown in Finals	Cardinals
2007	31–43	.419	5th Pinckney Division			DNQ	Cardinals
2006	35–38	.479	4th Pinckney Division			DNQ	Phillies
2005	36–39	.480	2nd Pinckney Division			DNQ	Phillies
2004	28–46	.378	4th Pinckney Division			DNQ	Phillies
2003	30–45	.400	3rd Pinckney Division			DNQ	Phillies
2002	34–42	.447	3rd Pinckney Division			DNQ	Phillies
2001	37–49	.487	4th McNamara Division			DNQ	Phillies
2000	39–37	.513	2nd McNamara Division	0–2	.000	Lost to Mahoning Valley in Semi-Finals	Phillies
1999	42–34	.553	2nd Pinckney Division	0–2	.000	Lost to Mahoning Valley in Semi-Finals	Phillies
1998	43–33	.566	Stedler Division champions	0–2	.000	Lost to Auburn in Semi-Finals	Phillies
1997	47–27	.635	2nd Stedler Division	3–2	.600	Defeated Oneonta in semi-finals; Lost to Pittsfield in Finals	Phillies
1996	42–33	.560	2nd Stedler Division			DNQ	Phillies
1995	41–34	.547	Stedler Division champions	1–2	.333	Lost to Watertown in Semi-Finals	Phillies
1994	40–34	.541	2nd Stedler Division			DNQ	Phillies
1993	38–39	.494	3rd Stedler Division			DNQ	Phillies
1992	36–34	.514	2nd Pinckney Division			DNQ	Phillies
1991	38–40	.487	3rd McNamara West Division			DNQ	Phillies
1990	41–35	.539	2nd McNamara West Division			DNQ	Phillies
1989	37–39	.487	3rd Western Division			DNQ	Phillies
1988	31–44	.413	4th Western Division			DNQ	Phillies
1987	23–54	.299	6th Western Division			DNQ	Co-Op
1986	30–45	.400	3rd Wrigley Division			DNQ	Indians
1985	33–45	.423	4th Southern Division			DNQ	Indians
1984	41–35	.539	3rd Western Division			DNQ	Indians
1983	32–43	.427	5th Western Division			DNQ	Indians
1982	33–40	.452	5th Western Division			DNQ	Indians
1981	16–59	.213	4th Western Division			DNQ	Indians
1980	31–42	.425	2nd Western Division			DNQ	Indians
1979	37–34	.521	3rd Wrigley Division			DNQ	Indians
1978	34–38	.472	3rd Wrigley Division			DNQ	Indians
1977	42–28	.600	West Division champions	0–2	.000	Lost to Oneonta in Finals	Indians
Totals	1499-1654	.475	Six Division Titles	9–15	.375	One League championship	

== Affiliation ==
As the Muckdogs, Batavia was affiliated with the Philadelphia Phillies from 1998, having been already affiliated with the Phillies since 1988, through the 2006 season. Beginning with the 2007 season, the Phillies chose to move their Short-Season A affiliate closer to Philadelphia with the Williamsport Crosscutters. Meanwhile, the Muckdogs signed with the St. Louis Cardinals. Prior to the Cardinals and Phillies affiliation Batavia was also affiliated with the Pittsburgh Pirates (1952–53; 1961–65), Detroit Tigers (1968–71), New York Mets (1972–74), and Cleveland Indians (1942–51; 1957–59; 1976–86). The team also fielded a co-op team in 1966 featuring players from 12 different organizations, most notably Cito Gaston of the Atlanta Braves. In 1975, the team fielded another co-op team with players from 8 organizations including Don McCormack from the Philadelphia Phillies. 1987 was the final co-op team in Batavia.

After the 2012 season, the St. Louis Cardinals announced they would move their affiliation to the State College Spikes, who they had been affiliated with before coming to Batavia. On September 28, 2012, the Muckdogs announced they had signed a two-year player development contract with the Miami Marlins who were affiliated with the Jamestown Jammers from 2002 to 2011. Jamestown signed an affiliation agreement with the Pittsburgh Pirates who had left State College.

Affiliation	Wins	Losses	Seasons
Cardinals (2007–2012)	240	209	6
Phillies (1988–2006, 1967)	756	756	20
Indians (1976–1986, 1957–1959, 1942–1951)	1,191	1,260	24
Mets (1972–1974)	82	125	3
Marlins (2012–2020)	277	327	9
Pirates (1961–1965, 1952–1953)	362	511	7
Tigers (1968–1971)	146	143	4
Co-Op (1987, 1975, 1966)	265	316	6

== Operations/ownership ==
From 2008 to 2017 the Rochester Red Wings Triple-A team of the International League was responsible for operating the club. The team had previously been operated by the Genesee County Baseball Club who remained majority owner though the Red Wings gained a share of ownership with each season they operated the franchise with a cap of 50%.

The team has been up for sale since 2010 due to financial losses. In 2016, a sale to an ownership group that intended to relocate the franchise to Waldorf, Maryland, beginning in the 2017 season collapsed when the new owners were unable to secure permission from the Baltimore Orioles and Washington Nationals, as well as the Eastern League and Carolina League. The Orioles' Class-AA affiliate, the Eastern League's Bowie Baysox, are located in nearby Bowie, Maryland; the Nationals' Class-A affiliate, the Potomac Nationals, are based in nearby Woodbridge, Virginia. A Muckdogs move to Maryland would have impacted those teams' territorial rights.

=== Surrender of franchise ===
The Muckdogs ownership group surrendered their franchise to the NYPL on December 19, 2017, after the NYPL declined the Red Wings offer to continue to operate the ball club and the remaining owners could not meet the financial requirements to keep the team solvent. Under the terms of the surrender, if the NYPL sells the franchise, the Red Wings and Genesee County Baseball Club each will receive 45% of the proceeds, with the league keeping a 10% fee for themselves. GCBC will retain the rights to the Batavia Muckdogs name, should the league opt to relocate the franchise to a city other than Batavia. The NYPL did not guarantee the franchise will play in 2018 if a buyer could not be found. GCBC spoke of the possibility of bringing collegiate summer baseball to Batavia in the event the NYPL left.

In January 2018, the New York–Penn League agreed to keep the Muckdogs in Batavia for the 2018 season after agreeing with the City of Batavia on a lease for Dwyer Field. In 2019, the Muckdogs signed a two-year renewal of its affiliation with the Marlins, which the city insisted upon as a condition of keeping the team in Batavia; any new ownership group would still be free to move the team.

As part of the reorganization of minor league baseball, the Muckdogs minor league squad was contracted along with most of the rest of the New York-Penn League prior to the 2021 season. GCBC, in keeping with their 2017 statements, transferred the Muckdogs intellectual property to a new expansion team in the PGCBL. The Muckdogs were one of two NYPL brands to make the transfer at that time (the Auburn Doubledays being the other); the Jamestown Jammers had previously made a similar transition in 2015.

== Record ==
Through the 2017 season, Batavia has played 75 seasons of professional baseball in its current location amassing 3,197 wins and 3,532 losses (.475).

The team's 3,000th win came in form of a 5–3 decision on June 23, 2012, against the Jamestown Jammers at Russell Diethrick Park in Jamestown, New York. Jamestown was the only other city of the league's original six remaining in the circuit, although it does not host the same franchise. Relief pitcher Jose Almarante earned the win.

=== Managerial history ===
Jack Tighe holds the All-Time record for wins in Batavia with a record of 298 wins and 239 losses in four seasons. Dann Bilardello is tied for the modern era regular (short-season) record with 126 wins and 99 losses in three seasons, Ángel Espada tied the record in the last game of the 2016 season after four seasons, however Bilardello has one playoff victory as well giving him 127 wins overall. Mike Jacobs was named the Muckdogs manager for the 2017/2018 seasons, Tom Lawless managed the club in 2019.

Gene Baker was the first African-American manager in affiliated baseball during the 1961 season with the Batavia Pirates. Baker also is credited as being the first African-American manager in Major League History when he filled in after ejections, however, Frank Robinson was the first ever hired full time.

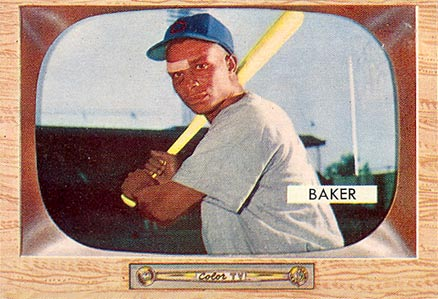
Gene Baker was named Batavia manager June 19, 1961.

==== All-time managerial records ====
Manager	Wins	Losses	Seasons
Al LeBoeuf	119	107	3 (1993–1995)
Ángel Espada	126	175	4 (2013–2016)
Art Mazmanian	23	54	1 (1987)
Bob Clear	51	67	1 (1962)
Bob Dustal	79	71	2 (1968–1969)
Brian Doyle	32	43	1 (1983)
Buddy Hancken	63	67	1 (1963)
Dann Bilardello	126	99	3 (2010–2012)
Dave Oliver	49	99	2 (1981–1982)
Don McCormack	68	83	2 (1988–1989)
Don Richmond	118	124	2 (1957–1958)
Ed Kobesky	127	124	2 (1949–1950)
Earl Wolgamot	49	61	1 (1943)
Ed Kobesky / Joe Vosmick	49	77	1 (1951)
Eddie Bane	74	80	2 (1984–1985)
Eddie Howard	54	54	1 (1941)
Floyd Rayford	42	33	1 (1996)
Frank Klebe	119	109	3 (1998, 2000–2001)
Gene Baker	33	97	1 (1964)
Gene Dusan	42	28	1 (1977)
George Genovese	57	68	1 (1952)
George Kinnamon	46	78	1 (1953)
George Susce	65	64	1 (1948)
Greg Legg	89	61	2 (1997, 1999)
Hal White	24	43	1 (1975)
Jack Cassini	30	40	1 (1976)
Jack Sanford	130	101	2 (1940, 1942)
Jack Tighe	298	239	4 (1944–1947)
James Adlam / Gene Baker	65	59	1 (1961)
Joe Lewis	67	72	2 (1970–1971)
Joey "Skipp" Martinez	144	71	5 (2021–Pres.)
Luis Isaac	34	38	1 (1978)
Luis Melendez	58	91	2 (2003–2004)
Manny Amador	36	39	1 (2005)
Mark DeJohn	114	110	3 (2007–2009)
Max Lanier	99	99	2 (1966–1967)
Mike Jacobs	66	85	2 (2017-2018)
Paul O'Dea	54	71	1 (1959)
Ramón Avilés	74	74	2 (1991–1992)
Ramón Avilés / Dave Cash / Tony Scott	41	35	1 (1990)
Rick Colzie	31	42	1 (1980)
Ronnie Ortegon	34	42	1 (2002)
Steve Roadcap	35	38	1 (2006)
Tom Chandler	30	45	1 (1986)
Tom Lawless	41	35	1 (2019)
Tom Saffell	47	75	1 (1965)
Tom Trebelhorn	37	34	1 (1979)
Wilber Huckle	82	125	3 (1972–1974)
William Buckley	48	54	1 (1939)

=== Most MLB players on a short-season team ===
The 1986 Batavia Trojans featured a short-season team record of eight future Major Leaguers on the roster — Jim Bruske, Tommy Hinzo, Tom Lampkin, Troy Neel, Bruce Egloff, Jeff Shaw, Joe Skalski, and Kevin Wickander—while affiliated with the Cleveland Indians. The record has since been broken with 11 by Batavia in 2007.

=== No-hitters ===
Batavia has been no-hit 15 times and thrown 5 no-hitters, however they are one of only two teams in league history who went on to win a game they had been no hit in when they defeated Newark 2–0 on August 3, 1973, for a record of 5–13 overall. Batavia was also part of the first ever league dual no-hitter where on August 25, 1952, Jim Mitchell of the Batavia Clippers and Frank Etchberger of the Bradford Phillies each no-hit the others team in opposite ends of a double header. The Clippers no-hit effort was not without controversy as it was a change by the official scorer that gave Mitchell his no-no. The Bradford paper reported the ball hit the glove of an outfielder and rolled to the wall where Bradford's Tommy Keane was originally given a double, it was then changed to an error after the game. On June 24, 2015, three Batavia pitchers (Gabriel Castellanos, Brett Lilek, Steven Farnworth) combined for the teams first perfect game in history against the Mahoning Valley Scrappers.

==== List of no-hitters ====
Date	Pitcher	Team	Opponent	Batavia Result	Innings
6/7/1943	Bob Vetter	Jamestown	Batavia	Lost	9 Innings
8/20/1953	Jim Mitchell	Batavia	Bradford	Won	9 Innings
8/20/1953	Frank Etcherberger	Bradford	Batavia	Lost	9 Innings
6/31/1961	Fred Wolff	Olean	Batavia	Lost	9 Innings
8/18/1969	Nils Lambert, Ron Thomas	Batavia	Geneva	Won	9 Innings
7/12/1972	Steven Avers	Jamestown	Batavia	Lost	7 Innings
8/3/1972	Thomas Deidel	Newark	Batavia	Won (2–0)	5 Innings
8/26/1972	Timothy Juran	Batavia	Niagara Falls	Won	7 Innings
8/25/1974	James Wright	Auburn	Batavia	Lost	7 Innings
6/30/1976	Laurence Kienzle	Niagara Falls	Batavia	Lost	7 Innings
8/15/1978	Randall Bozeman	Little Falls	Batavia	Lost	7 Innings
8/3/1981	Gregory Dunn	Erie	Batavia	Lost	9 Innings
8/28/1989	Ray Doss	Welland	Batavia	Lost	9 Innings
9/1/1993	Peter Agostinelli	Batavia	Welland	Won	7 Innings
7/28/1996	Luis De Los Santos	Oneonta	Batavia	Lost	9 Innings
8/26/2005	Robert Ray, Adrian Martin	Auburn	Batavia	Lost (5–0)	9 Innings
9/6/2006	Henry Cabrera, Olivo Astacio	Williamsport	Batavia	Lost (1–0)	9 Innings
7/15/2007	Guillermo Moscoso*	Oneonta	Batavia	Lost (6–0)	9 Innings
9/1/2013	Luis Gomez, Carlos Melo, Kerry Doane	Mahoning Valley	Batavia	Lost (6–0)	9 Innings
6/24/2015	Gabriel Castellanos, Brett Lilek, Steven Farnworth*	Batavia	Mahoning Valley	Won (1–0)	9 Innings

- * Denotes Perfect Game

== Playoff history ==
In the team's storied history they have made a total of 19 playoff appearances.

=== Overview ===
Batavia has won four league championships including 2008 as the Muckdogs, 1963 season as the Batavia Pirates and the 1945 and 1946 seasons as the Batavia Clippers. Batavia has won five division championships since the league adapted divisional play starting in the 1977 season, these titles include the Pinckney Division in 1995, 2008, and 2010, the Stedler in 1998, and the Western Division in 1977. The team also made playoff appearances as the wild card in 1999 and 2000 where they lost in the semi-finals, as well as 1997 when they advanced to the league championship where they were defeated by the Pittsfield Mets.

=== Playoff appearances ===
Jack Tighe lead Batavia to their first two championships in 1945 & 1946.

YEAR	RESULT	MANAGER	DIVISION
1939	Lost in first round	Jack Sanford	4th*
1940	Lost in league finals	Jack Sanford	2nd*
1941	Lost in first round	Eddie Howard	3rd*
1942	Lost in first round	Jack Sanford	3rd*
1944	Lost in first round	Jack Tighe	3rd*
1945	League champions	Jack Tighe	1st*
1946	League champions	Jack Tighe	1st(t)*
1949	Lost in first round	Ed Kobesky	4th*
1957	Lost league finals	Don Richmond	4th*
1961	Lost league finals	James Adlam/Gene Baker	3rd*
1963	League champions	Buddy Hancken	3rd*
1977	Lost league finals	Gene Dusan	1st
1995	Lost in first round	Al LeBoeuf	1st
1997	Lost in league finals	Greg Legg	2nd
1998	Lost in first round	Frank Klebe	1st
1999	Lost in first round	Greg Legg	2nd
2000	Lost in first round	Frank Klebe	2nd
2008	League champions	Mark DeJohn	1st
2010	Lost in first round	Dann Bilardello	1st
2019	Lost in first round	Tom Lawless	1st
2022	Lost in league finals	Joey "Skipp" Martinez	1st
2023	Lost in first round	Joey "Skipp" Martinez	1st
2024	Lost in second round	Joey "Skipp" Martinez	1st
2025	Lost in league finals	Joey "Skipp" Martinez	1st
2026	League champions	Joey "Skipp" Martinez	1st

- Denotes regular season league finish before divisional play.

=== 1945 league and playoff champions ===
During the PONY League seasons from 1939 to 1956, there was a league champion and playoff champion format; the 1945 season saw Batavia finish with a record of 84 wins and 40 losses to clinch the league championship by nine games over the Jamestown Falcons. The Clippers defeated the Bradford Blue Wings three games to one in the first round of the playoffs before defeating the Lockport White Sox four games to three in the playoff championship. Batavia had a league best 1.40 ERA during the season.

=== 1946 league and playoff champions ===
The 1946 season saw Batavia and Jamestown finish tied with a record of 84 wins and 41 losses to claim a share of the league championship. Jamestown defeated Batavia in a one-game playoff by a score of 6–2. Batavia then defeated the Olean Oilers in the playoffs four games to three before defeating Jamestown four games to two in the championship. Batavia's Dick Kokos lead the league during the 1946 season in runs with 118, hits with 166, RBIs with 114, and tied for home runs with 21.

=== 1963 playoff champions ===
The 1963 Batavia Pirates were an unlikely championship team that entered the playoffs with 42 wins and 67 losses during the regular season. Facing the Jamestown Tigers in the best of three series the Pirates opened with a home loss by the score of 4–3 before heading to Jamestown to defeat the Tigers by a score of 2–1. During game two pitchers Bob Lee and Bob Baird shut down Jamestown as Fred Michalski hit a home run early and Norm Housley drove in a run in the seventh that gave Batavia all the runs the pitching due would need, the Tigers scored their loan run in the bottom of the seventh. In the series finale the Pirates won handily by the score of 7–3 before a home crowd of 1,305 at MacArthur Stadium. Byron Brown, who led the league with 32 home runs in the regular season, hit a two-run home run in the first inning and then drove in two more with a single in the fourth. Lefty Ron Fiorella was the winning pitcher for the Pirates while Jim Hassett also hit a home run during the deciding game. Leading the Pirates for the playoffs was José Martínez with 8 hits as Fiorella picked up two wins.

=== 1977 West Division champions ===
In 1957 the PONY League adapted the name the New–York Pennsylvania League and continued to do a league champion and playoff champion until 1974 when it was changed to a first half and second half champion until the 1976 season. During the 1977 season the league did a first half and second half champion within two divisions instead of a league format, Batavia won the Western Division in both halves. The following season, 1978, the league changed to solely one season division format.

During the 1977 League Finals Oneonta defeated the Batavia squad 2-0 to clinch the League championship. In Game One, played in Batavia, the Yankees defeated the Trojans 5-2 behind the pitching of southpaw Chris Welsh, who struck out 11 batters. Future Major League Baseball star Willie McGee played centerfield for the Yankees, Sal Rende and Jerry Dybzinski homered for the Trojans.

In game two of the championship series, the Yankees held off the Trojans by the score of 5–4, though the Trojans had been down 5–0.

=== 1995 Pinckney Division champions ===
Batavia won the Stedler Division with a record of 41 wins and 34 losses under manager Al LeBoeuf before losing in the semifinals to eventual champion the Watertown Indians. Team leaders included Walt Dawkins with a .315 average; Steve Carver with 41 RBIs, 7 home runs and 13 doubles which tied with Jon Cornelius; future major leaguer Marlon Anderson with 92 hits and 52 runs; Gary Yeager with 9 wins; Brian Ford with a 1.18 ERA and 10 saves. The team also featured future major leaguer Anthony Shumaker.

=== 1997 wild card ===
Batavia clinched the wild-card playoff spot in 1997 finishing with a record of 47 wins and 27 losses under manager Greg Legg. The Clippers defeated the Erie SeaWolves in the semifinals before falling to the Pittsfield Mets in the league championship. Team leaders included Gary Burham with a .325 average, 22 doubles, and 94 hits; future major leaguer Andy Dominique with 14 home runs; Jason Johnson with 20 stolen bases and 5 triples; Rusty McNamara with 54 RBIs; Derek Adair with 7 wins; clay Eason with a 0.92 ERA; and Brett Black with 15 saves. The team also included future major leaguers Randy Wolf, Thomas Jacquez, and Johnny Estrada.

=== 1998 Stedler Division champions ===
Batavia finished with a record of 43 wins and 33 losses winning the Stedler Division under manager Frank Klebe before losing to the Auburn Doubledays in the semifinals. 1998 was one of the only times in league history there would be co-champions as the weather made fields unplayable, Auburn and the Oneonta Yankees were named co-champions. Team leaders for Batavia included future major leaguer Jason Michaels with 11 home runs; Shayne Carnes with a .329 average and 78 hits; Carlos Duncan with 23 doubles and 55 runs; Nick Punto with 19 stolen bases; Geoff Geary with 9 wins and 1.60 ERA; Cary Hiles with 10 saves. The team also featured future major leaguer Carlos Silva.

=== 1999 wild card ===
Batavia finished with a record of 42 wins and 34 losses one game behind division champion the Mahoning Valley Scrappers under manager Greg Legg. Batavia lost to the Scrappers in the semi-finals. Team leaders include future major league outfielder Marlon Byrd with 13 home runs, 50 RBIs, 72 hits; Shomari Beverly with 13 doubles; Tom Batson with a .298 average; Brad Pautz with 8 wins; Ryan Brookman with a 0.46 ERA; Justin Fry with 6 saves. The team also featured major leaguers Frank Brooks, Ryan Madson, and Jorge Padilla.

=== 2000 wild card ===
Batavia finished with a record of 39 wins and 37 losses during the 2000 season under manager Frank Klebe earning a playoff spot as a wild card, eventually losing to the Mahoning Valley Scrappers in the semi-finals for the second year in a row. Future major leaguer Travis Chapman lead the team in hitting with a .316 average, other team leaders included Dario Delgado with 40 RBIs and 7 home runs; Scott Youngbauer with 16 doubles; Jason Barnette with 67 hits; Anthony Hensley with 43 stolen bases; Dan Adams with a 2.17 ERA; Trevor Bullock with six wins. The team featured future Phillies All-Star Chase Utley as well as Miguel Asencio and Eude Brito.

=== 2008 NY–Penn League champions ===
Under manager Mark DeJohn during the 2008 season the team finished the regular season with 46 wins and 28 losses to clinch the Pinckney Division title. Batavia swept the Florida Marlins affiliate the Jamestown Jammers to claim the 2008 NY–Penn League championship on September 14, 2008, by a score of 9–3, after defeating the Boston Red Sox affiliate the Lowell Spinners two games to one in the semi-finals. Team leaders included Jermaine Curtis and Colt Sedbrook with a .305 average; Chris Swauger with 7 home runs; Shane Peterson with 20 doubles and 67 hits; Jose Garcia with 48 runs; Ramón Delgado with 6 wins; Thomas Eager with a 1.76 ERA; and Adam Reifer 22 saves

=== 2010 Pinckney Division champions ===
The Muckdogs won the 2010 Pinckney Division championship under manager Dann Bilardello with a record of 45 wins and 29 losses, clinching against the Jamestown Jammers on September 1 at Russell Diethrick Park in Jamestown, New York. Batavia lost in the semi-finals to eventual league champion the Tri-City ValleyCats two games to one. Team leaders include Rainel Rosario with a .321 average; Jonathan Rodriguez with 12 home runs; Victor Sanchez with 19 doubles; Nick Longmire with 76 hits, 7 triples, and 53 runs; Andrew Moss with 8 wins; Jose Rada with a 1.12 ERA and ten saves.

=== 2019 Pinckney Division champions ===
The Muckdogs won the 2019 Pinckney Division championship under manager Tom Lawless with a record of 41 wins and 31 losses, clinching against the Auburn Doubledays on the last day of the season - September 2 at Falcon Park in Auburn, New York. Batavia defeated the Lowell Spinners in game one of their playoff series before dropping two games in Lowell by the scores of 1–2 and 3–4; the Brooklyn Cyclones defeated Lowell in the finals. Team leaders included Nic Ready with 10 home runs, 47 RBI's, and tied a league record of 30 doubles; JD Orr with a .352 batting average and 29 stolen bases; Julio Frias lead the pitching staff with 5 victors - tied with Jackson Rose- while striking out 73 over 70 innings; Evan Brabrand had a 1.29 ERA in the closer role compiling 13 saves; Edgar Martinez lead the team with 72 innings pitched.

== Attendance ==
=== Largest crowd ===
The largest crowd to attend a professional game in Batavia is over 4,000 during the inaugural 1939 season. In more recent years, the two largest crowds happened on July 27, 2019, with 2,779 fans packing the stadium thanks to a promotion from local company Tompkins Insurance that bought anyone who wanted to attend a ticket. On July 29, 2011, 2,445 fans attended a game versus the Staten Island Yankees to see local Rochester native Cito Culver, who scored two runs for the Yankees and also batted another run in.

=== Year by year ===
As teams move to larger markets, and western New York area residency dwindling, the Muckdogs find themselves ranking last in attendance, though in 2008 a new policy was put forth by the Red Wings management to only report through the gate fans and not add on like several teams do to pad attendance records. Attendance substantially rebounded in 2019 as fans rallied behind the team in a last-ditch effort to save it.

Year	Openings	Total	Average
2025	23	55,704	2,422
2024	21	46,813	2,229
2023	20	45,178	2,259
2022	23	41,357	1,798
2021	23	40,888	1,778
2019	37	43,118	1,165
2018	37	29,005	784
2017	34	27,389	806
2016	37	30,007	811
2015	35	32,221	921
2014	35	33,376	954
2013	35	33,909	969
2012	37	33,443	904
2011	35	37,029	1,058
2010	36	36,601	1,017
2009	37	35,620	963
2008	36	43,167	1,199
2007	37	44,270	1,230
2006	34	39,094	1,150
2005	36	40,557	1,127

== Roster ==
Batavia Muckdogs roster
Active roster	Coaching staff
Pitchers: 0 Dylan Kinney; 4 Trey Bacon; 6 Chris Isaac; 8 Tyler Prospero; 13 Anthony Sullivan; 19 Nolan Sparks; 21 Joe Tobia; 22 Tyler Henshaw; 25 Jackson Murphy; 28 A.J. Winger; 34 Josh Milleville; 40 Julian Pichardo; 46 Aidan Cooney; 66 Alex Hale; 77 Ryan Kinney; Catchers: 14 Vinny Grazioplene; 18 Levis Aguila Jr.; 36 Mitch Fleming; Infielders: 5 Kyle Corso; 7 Caleb Rodriguez; 9 Jerry Reinhart; 10 Daniel Burroway; 24 Brian Fry; 31 Kenny Dodson Jr.; 35 Tyler Cannoe; 99 Alex Torres; Outfielders: 1 Dallas Young; 2 Gavin Schrader; 16 Josh Leadem; 37 Abner Benitez	Manager: 65 Joey "Skip" Martinez; Coaches: 42 Thomas Eaton (Pitching Coach); -- Dylan Potemri & John Carubba (Broadcast); —- Lorenzo Raymundo & Brandon Kropf (Interns); -- Andrew Cartmell (Assistant General Manager); -- Connor Beagle (Statistician); 17 Erik Moscicki (Clubhouse Manager); Disabled list; ‡ Inactive list; § Suspended list; updated August 8, 2022

== Notable Major League alumni ==
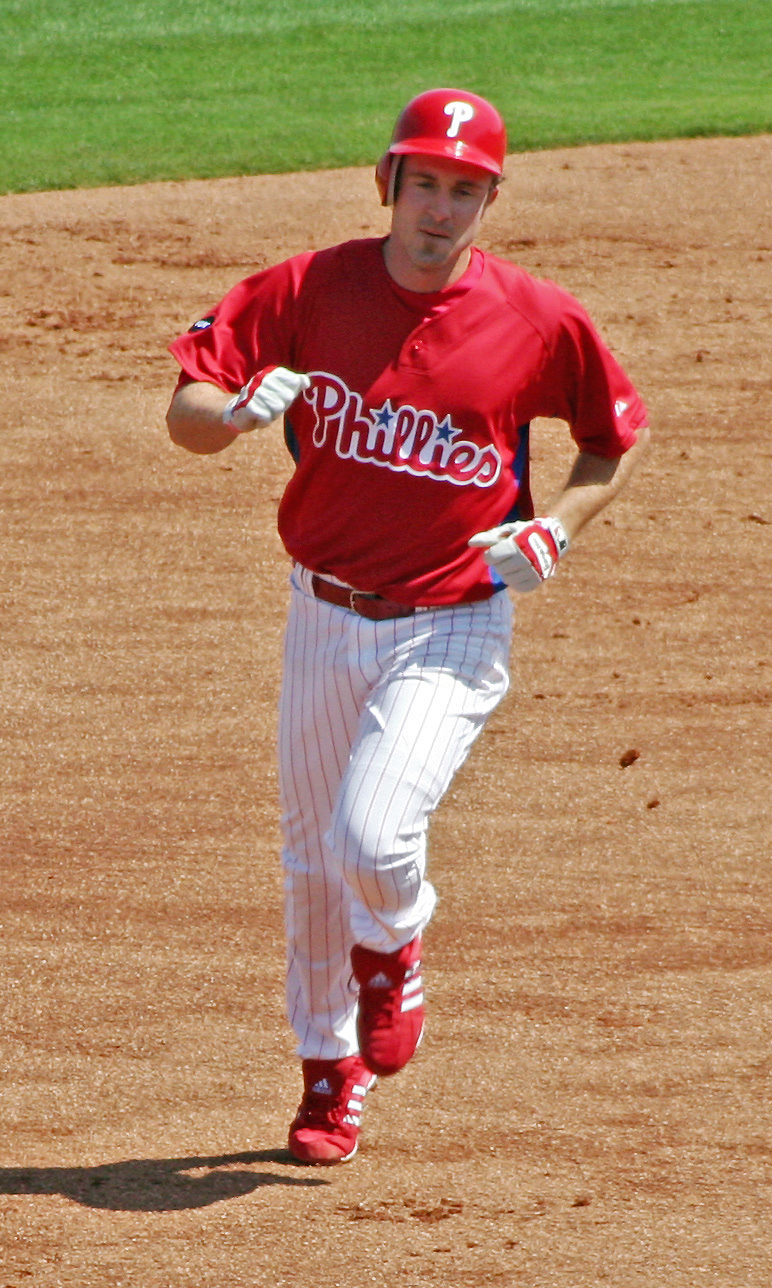
Phillies All-Star Chase Utley made his pro debut in Batavia during the 2000 season.

- Andy Allanson (1983)
- Marlon Anderson (1995)
- Andy Ashby (1988) 2 x MLB All-Star
- Gene Baker (1961) MLB All-Star
- Gary Bennett (1993)
- Steve Blass (1961) MLB All-Star
- Marlon Byrd (1999) MLB All-Star
- Matt Carpenter (2009) 3 x MLB All-Star
- Carlos Carrasco (2005)
- Doc Ellis (1964) MLB All-Star
- Johnny Estrada (1997) MLB All-Star
- Woodie Fryman (1965) 2 x MLB All-Star
- Gene Garber (1965)
- Cito Gaston (1966) MLB All-Star; Manager 1992-1993 World Series Champion - Toronto Blue Jays
- Kelly Gruber (1980 2 x MLB All-Star
- Joe Kelly (2009)
- J.A. Happ (2004) MLB All-Star
- Ryan Howard (2001) 3 x MLB All Star; 2005 NL Rookie of the Year; 2006 NL Most Valuable Player
- Bob Lee (1963) MLB All-Star
- Lance Lynn (2009) MLB All-Star
- Ryan Madson (1999)
- Lou Marson (2005)
- Nick Punto (1998)
- Manny Sanguillén (1965) 3 x MLB All-Star
- Jeff Shaw (1986) 2 x MLB All-Star
- Ryan Sherriff (2011)
- Kevin Siegrist (2009)
- Chase Utley (2000) 6 x MLB All-Star
- Randy Wolf (1997) MLB All-Star
- Mike Williams (1990) 2 x MLB All-Star
- Trevor Williams (2013)
- Ned Yost (1974) Manager 2015 World Series Champion - Kansas City Royals
- Brad Ziegler (2003)

=== Alumni in other sports ===
Five-time National Hockey League (NHL) all-star Murray Oliver played for Batavia during the 1958 season.

National Football League (NFL) tailback Ricky Williams played thirteen games for the team during the 1998 season before returning to Texas to prepare for the upcoming NCAA football season as a strong candidate for the Heisman Award, which he ultimately won.

=== Local ties ===
Fourteen Genesee County Baseball Players have suited up professionally for their local Batavia team.

- 1939 – OF Gordon "Bus" Merrill from Elba, P Frank "Pike" Trigilio from Oakfield, and 1B James "Jim" Carragher from Le Roy
- 1940 – P William "Bill" Kell from Darien and OF Laverne "Pete" Petherbridge from Byron
- 1943–1944 – P Theodore "Ted" Platek from Pavilion
- 1946–1947 – P John "Johnny" Freeman from S. Byron
- 1948 – INF Jerry Maley from Batavia
- 1950 – C Robert "Bob" Radley from Batavia
- 1951 – P Ray "Jamo" Jamalkowski from Batavia
- 1952 and 1957 – P Richard "Dick" Raymond from Batavia
- 1957 – P Frank Dudley from Batavia
- 1958 – P Larry Richenburg from Elba
- 1989 – OF Mickey Hyde from E. Bethany

Local players who have suited up for the Perfect Game Collegiate Baseball League franchise.

- 2021 – P Colin Noeth from Byron
- 2021–2022 – INF Jerry Reinhart from Batavia
- 2021–2022 – P Tyler Prospero from Batavia
- 2022 – C Vinny Grazioplene from Batavia
- 2022 – OF Gavin Schrader from Batavia
- 2022–2023 – P Alex Hale from Batavia
- 2023-2024 P Tyrone Woods from Alexander
- 2024-2025 P Bryceton Berry from Batavia
- 2025 P Jaden Sherwood from Batavia
