= Bradford Bees =

- 1939–1957; (1939–1942, 1944–1957); Bradford, Pennsylvania

Minor league affiliations
- Previous classes: Class D
- League: New York–Penn League (1957)
- Previous leagues: Pennsylvania–Ontario–New York League (1939–1956)

Major league affiliations
- Previous teams: Cincinnati Redlegs (1957); New York Yankees (1956); Philadelphia Phillies (1944–1955); Boston Braves (1942); Boston Bees (1939–1941)

Minor league titles
- League titles: 2 (1941, 1949)

Team data
- Previous names: Bradford Beagles/Hornell Redlegs (1957); Bradford Yankees (1956); Bradford Phillies (1950–1955); Bradford Blue Wings (1944–1949); Bradford Bees (1939–1942)

The Bradford Bees were an American minor league baseball team that was based in Bradford, Pennsylvania during the twentieth century.

== History ==
The Bradford Bees was a charter member of the Pennsylvania-Ontario-New York (PONY) League and played eighteen seasons from 1939 to 1957 (the team sat out the 1943 season due to World War II). Over the course of the team's history, the team also played under the names Bradford Beagles, Bradford Blue Wings, Bradford Phillies and Bradford Yankees.

As the Bees, the team won the league title in 1941. The Blue Wings also won a league title in 1949.

In its final season, the Beagles split their schedule between Bradford and Hornell after the Hornell Dodgers had ceased operations; in Hornell, the team was known as the Hornell Redlegs.

Bradford no longer hosts baseball at the professional level, nor does it host summer baseball as a few other former PONY League markets that have shrunk to the point where they can no longer support the professional game have done.

== Notable alumni ==
- Warren Spahn (1940) Inducted Baseball Hall of Fame, 1973
- Roy Face (1949-1950) 6 x MLB All-Star
- Frank McCormick (1951) 9 x MLB All-Star; 1940 NL Most Valuable Player
- Jim Owens (1951)
- Jack Sanford (1948) MLB All-Star; 1957 NL Rookie of the Year
- Carl Sawatski (1945)
