= 2024 Loudoun United FC season =

Loudoun United FC
2024 season
- Head coach: Ryan Martin
- Stadium: Segra Field
- USL Championship: Conference: 11th Overall: 21st
- USL Cup: DNQ
- U.S. Open Cup: Round of 16
- Top goalscorer: League: Zach Ryan (10); All: Zach Ryan (10)
- Highest home attendance: 4,589 vs Pittsburgh Riverhounds (October 19)
- Lowest home attendance: 1,525 vs Monterey Bay FC (May 18)
- Average home league attendance: 3,315
- Biggest win: 3–0 (3 times)
- Biggest defeat: 1–3 vs Birmingham Legion (A), April 7 2024, USL Championship
Home colors	Away colors
- All statistics correct as of November 1 2024.

The 2024 season was Loudoun United FC's sixth season of existence, sixth in the second-division of American soccer, in the USL Championship.

== Club ==
=== Roster ===
As of June 2, 2024

Note: Flags indicate national team as defined under FIFA eligibility rules; some limited exceptions apply. Players may hold more than one non-FIFA nationality.

No.	Pos.	Nation	Player
1	GK	USA	Dane Jacomen
2	DF	USA	Keegan Hughes (on loan from Columbus Crew)
3	DF	USA	Keegan Tingey
4	MF	USA	Tommy McCabe
5	DF	FRA	Yanis Leerman
6	DF	CAN	Kwame Awuah
7	FW	USA	Wesley Leggett
8	MF	FRA	Florian Valot
9	FW	USA	Tommy Williamson
10	FW	USA	Kalil ElMedkhar
11	FW	USA	Isaac Espinal
12	MF	USA	Drew Skundrich
13	MF	USA	Alex Nagy
14	FW	USA	Zach Ryan

No.	Pos.	Nation	Player
15	FW	NZL	Riley Bidois
16	DF	USA	Cole Turner
17	MF	HAI	Christiano François
18	FW	SEN	Pape Amadou Wane
22	DF	USA	Robby Dambrot
23	GK	FRA	Hugo Fauroux
24	DF	USA	Jacob Erlandson
30	FW	EGY	Abdellatif Aboukoura
31	DF	USA	Graham Jones
36	DF	USA	Justin Melly
40	MF	USA	Gavin Turner
77	MF	HON	Alessandro Maldonado
98	GK	USA	Luke Peacock

Signed to first team contract with D.C. United.
D.C. United Academy player.

=== Staff ===
As of March 10, 2024

Executive
Executive Business Officer	(United States) Doug Raftery
Director of Soccer	(England) Oliver Gage
Senior Analyst, Scouting	(United States) Patrick Mullins
Team Administrator	(United States) Kristi Beckman
Technical staff
Head Coach	(United States) Ryan Martin
Assistant Coach	(United States) Steve Coleman
Goalkeeping Coach	(Poland) Jack Stefanowski
Head of Performance	(Argentina) Victor Lonchuk
Head Athletic Trainer	(United States) Drazan Vukovic
Equipment Manager	(United States) TJ Salzberg
Team Psychologist	Dr. Keith Kauffman

== Non-competitive ==
=== Preseason exhibitions ===
January 27	(United States) Loudoun United	3–1	(Ecuador) Barcelona S.C.	Bradenton, Florida
				Stadium: IMG Academy; Attendance: 0

== Competitive ==
=== USL Championship ===
==== Standings ====
Pos	Team	Pld	W	L	T	GF	GA	GD	Pts	Qualification
8	North Carolina FC	34	13	12	9	54	43	+11	48	Playoffs
9	Birmingham Legion FC	34	13	15	6	44	51	−7	45	
10	Hartford Athletic	34	12	14	8	39	52	−13	44	
11	Loudoun United FC	34	11	14	9	44	39	+5	42	
12	Miami FC	34	3	29	2	26	89	−63	11	

Source: USL Championship Standings
Rules for classification: 1) head-to-head points; 2) head-to-head goal differential; 3) points-per game within conference; 4) total wins; 5) total goal differential; 6) total goals scored; 7) points earned against top four Conference finishers; 8) disciplinary points; 9) coin toss or drawing of lots

==== Match results ====
March 9 1	San Antonio FC	2–2	Loudoun United	San Antonio, Texas
9:30 PM EST	Silva 14', (yellow card) 76'; Agudelo 48'	Report	Ryan 18'; Erlandson (yellow card) 23'; François (red card) 29'; Leerman (yellow card) 74'; Dambrot (yellow card) 82'; Valot 90+4'; Skundrich (yellow card) 90+6'	Stadium: Toyota Field; Attendance: 7,263; Referee: Calin Radosav

March 16 2	Loudoun United	3–1	North Carolina FC	Leesburg, Virginia
9:30 PM EST	ElMedkhar 23'; Leggett (yellow card) 37'; Ryan 61', (yellow card) 71'; Aboukoura 85'	Report	da Costa (yellow card) 36'; Maldonado 38'	Stadium: Segra Field; Attendance: 3,810; Referee: Elvis Osmanovic

March 23 3	Detroit City FC	2–1	Loudoun United	Hamtramck, Michigan
9:30 PM EST	Amoh (yellow card) 9'; Rodriguez (yellow card) 16', (goal) 71'; Diop 56'; Murphy (yellow card) 63'	Report	Leggett 14'; Hughes (yellow card) 90+3'	Stadium: Keyworth Stadium; Attendance: 6,231; Referee: Adam Kilpatrick

April 7 4	Birmingham Legion	3–1	Loudoun United FC	Birmingham, Alabama
6:30 PM EST	Mensah (yellow card) 45'; Leerman 67' (o.g.); Pasher 74'; Murana 90+6'	Report	McCabe (yellow card) 22'; Aboukoura 48'; Erlandson (yellow card) 60'	Stadium: Protective Stadium; Attendance: 2,112; Referee: Melvin Rivas

April 13 5	Loudoun United FC	2–1	Memphis 901 FC	Leesburg, Virginia
4:00 PM EST	Ryan 42'; Skundrich 69'; Williamson (yellow card) 90+6'; Leggett (yellow card) 90+7'	Report	Careaga 14'; Marlon (yellow card) 25'; Duncan (yellow card) 44'; Paul (yellow card) 75'; Hyndman (yellow card) 90+9'	Stadium: Segra Field; Attendance: 2,820; Referee: Matthew Corrigan

April 20 6	Loudoun United FC	0–1	Louisville City	Leesburg, Virginia
4:00 PM EST	Valot (yellow card) 45'	Report	Ordoñez (yellow card) 20'; Valot 67' (o.g.); Harris (yellow card) 89'; González (yellow card) 89'	Stadium: Segra Field; Attendance: 2,879; Referee: Alyssa Nichols; Assistant referees: Nicholas Seymour; Joseph Knoff; Fourth official: Gary Gutierrez

April 27 7	Sacramento Republic FC	3–1	Loudoun United FC	Sacramento, California
10:00 PM EST	López (yellow card) 5'; Cicerone 10'; Donovan (yellow card) 21'; Amann (yellow card) 49'; Sanchez (yellow card) 69'; Gurr (yellow card) 77'; Timmer (yellow card) 78'; Phillips 86' 90+2'	Report	Leggett 28'; Awuah (yellow card) 45+4'; McCabe (yellow card) 60'; Skundrich (yellow card) 75'	Stadium: Heart Health Park; Attendance: 10,246; Referee: Trevor Wiseman

May 4 8	Loudoun United FC	0 - 0	Detroit City FC	Leesburg, Virginia
7:00 PM EST	Skundrich (yellow card) 30'; ElMedkhar (yellow card) 78'	Report	Villanueva (yellow card) 35'; Diop (yellow card) 59'	Stadium: Segra Field; Attendance: 3,017; Referee: Lorenzo Hernandez

May 10 9	Loudoun United	0–2	El Paso Locomotive	Leesburg, Virginia
7:00 PM EST	Aboukoura (yellow card) 66'	Report	Moshobane 1'; Lyons (yellow card) 33'; Calvillo 40'; Moshobane (yellow card) 58'; Rose (yellow card) 80'; Waite (yellow card) 87'; Alfaro (yellow card) 90+1'	Stadium: Segra Field; Attendance: 1,836; Referee: Velimir Stefanovic

May 14 10	North Carolina FC	2–0	Loudoun United FC	Cary, North Carolina
7:26 PM EST	Mentzingen (yellow card) 1'; Craig 24'; Somersall (yellow card) 41'; Armstrong (yellow card) 67' (goal) 90+7'; Batista (yellow card) 74' (yellow-red card) 90+12'	Report	Erlandson (yellow card) 13'; Skundrich (yellow card) 26'; Fauroux (yellow card) 32'	Stadium: WakeMed Soccer Park; Attendance: 1,359; Referee: Jonathan Bilinski

May 18 11	Loudoun United FC	3–0	Monterey Bay FC	Leesburg, Virginia
7:30 PM EST	Dambrot (yellow card) 3'; Bidois 9'; Zwetsloot (yellow card) 49'; ElMedkhar 56'; McCabe (yellow card) 64'; Guzmán 79' (o.g.); Wane (yellow card) 83'; Turner (yellow card) 88'	Report	Orendian (yellow card) 16' (yellow-red card) 38'; Doner (yellow card) 28'; Lara (yellow card) 45+5'	Stadium: Segra Field; Attendance: 1,525; Referee: Thomas Snyder

May 25 12	Orange County SC	0–2	Loudoun United FC	Irvine, California
4:00 PM EST	Chattha (yellow card) 41'; Scott (yellow card) 88'; Miles (red card) 90+5'	Report	Valot 34'; Erlandson (yellow card) 51'; Skundrich (yellow card) 72'; Ryan 90+6' (pen.)	Stadium: Championship Soccer Stadium; Attendance: 4,342; Referee: Natalie Simon

June 1 13	Loudoun United FC	3–0	FC Tulsa	Leesburg, Virginia
7:00 PM EDT	Valot 8'; Skundrich (yellow card) 35'; Ryan 45'; Dambrot 54'	Report	Seagrist (yellow card) 15'; Damm (yellow card) 38'; Bourgeois (yellow card) 45+2'; Diallo (yellow card) 70'	Stadium: Segra Field; Attendance: 3,505; Referee: John Griggs

June 14 14	Loudoun United FC	1–1	Las Vegas Lights FC	Leesburg, Virginia
7:00 PM EST	McCabe (yellow card) 24' (goal) 52'; Ryan (yellow card) 45+6'	Report	Gannon 2'; Bennett (yellow card) 36'; Howell (yellow card) 43'	Stadium: Segra Field; Attendance: 3,580; Referee: Nabil Bensalah

June 22 15	Miami FC	2–2	Loudoun United FC	Miami, Florida
7:00 PM EST	Lopez 11' (yellow card) 90+2'; Booth (yellow card) 14'; Lawrence 26'; Genzano (yellow card) 32'; Barbir (yellow card) 49'; Gavilanes (yellow card) 90'	Report	Aboukoura 51'; Bidois 53'; Wane (yellow card) 90+1'; Bustamante (yellow card) 90+5'	Stadium: FIU Stadium; Attendance: 846; Referee: Eric Tattersall

June 29 16	Loudoun United FC	2–0	Tampa Bay Rowdies	Leesburg, Virginia
7:30 PM EST	Aboukoura 15'; Tingey (yellow card) 57'; Fauroux (yellow card) 73'; Leggett (yellow card) 77' (goal) 90'	Report		Stadium: Segra Field; Attendance: 3,076; Referee: Luis Arroyo

July 3 17	Loudoun United FC	3–0	Hartford Athletic	Leesburg, Virginia
7:00 PM EST	Leggett 25'; McCabe (yellow card) 38'; Ryan 45+1', 46'; Skundrich (yellow card) 55'; Tingey (yellow card) 71'	Report	Scarlett (yellow card) 20'; Farrell (yellow card) 23'; Ribeiro (yellow card) 71'	Stadium: Segra Field; Attendance: 3,789; Referee: John Matto

July 13 18	Indy Eleven	1–1	Loudoun United FC	Indianapolis, IN
7:00 PM EDT	Chapman-Page (yellow card) 28'; R. Williams (yellow card) 46'; Collier 74'	Report	Leggett 58'; Ryan (yellow card) 63'	Stadium: Carroll Stadium; Attendance: 9,672; Referee: Brandon Stevis

July 24, 2024 21	Loudoun United FC	1–2	Charleston Battery	Leesburg, Virginia
1:00 PM	Ryan 79'; Awuah (yellow card) 90+8'	Report	Dossantos 11'; Markanich 25'; Archer (yellow card) 50'; Ycaza (yellow card) 58'; Molloy (yellow card) 77'	Stadium: Segra Field; Attendance: 2,512; Referee: Adam Kilpatrick

July 27 20	Pittsburgh Riverhounds SC	1–1	Loudoun United FC	Pittsburgh, PA
7:00PM EST	Mertz 12' (pen.); Osumanu (yellow card) 51'; Sample (red card) 90+4'	Report	Leeroman (yellow card) 11'; Johnston (yellow card) 32'; McCabe (yellow card) 49'; Leggett 63'	Stadium: Highmark Stadium; Attendance: 5,613; Referee: Alex Billeter

August 3 21	Loudoun United FC	4–1	Miami FC	Leesburg, Virginia
7:30 PM EST	Aboukoura 45+8' (pen.); ElMedkhar 66', 76'; Williamson 90+2'	Report	Genzaon 2'; Palacios (yellow card) 44'; López (yellow card) 45+1' (yellow-red card) 45+9'; Cardona (yellow card) 45+4' (yellow-red card) 51'; Francois (yellow card) 82'	Stadium: Segra Field; Attendance: 1,876; Referee: Brad Jensen

August 10 22	Oakland Roots SC	3–1	Loudoun United FC	Hayward, California
	Nije 24'; Rodriguez 62'; Reid 81'	Report	ElMedkhar 54'; Dambrot (yellow card) 77'; Ryan (yellow card) 81'	Stadium: Pioneer Stadium; Attendance: 3,516; Referee: Greg Dopka

August 17 23	Tampa Bay Rowdies	0–2	Loudoun United FC	St. Petersburg, Florida
	Bodily (yellow card) 17' (yellow-red card) 61'	Report	Dambrot (yellow card) 28'; Leggett 34'; Leerman (yellow card) 53'; Ryan 69'; Aboukoura (yellow card) 90+1'	Stadium: Al Lang Stadium; Referee: Elijio Arreguin

August 24 24	Loudoun United FC	0–0	Rhode Island FC	Leesburg, VA
7:30 PM	Ryan (yellow card) 34'; Turner (yellow card) 87'	Report	Kwizera (yellow card) 57'; Stoneman (yellow card) 80'; Williams (yellow card) 90+9'	Stadium: Segra Field; Attendance: 4,017; Referee: Thomas Snyder

August 31 25	Loudoun United FC	0–1	Phoenix Rising FC	Leesburg, Virginia
7:30 PM	Leerman (yellow card) 40'; Ryan (yellow card) 74'; Wane (yellow card) 90+4'	Report	Cuello (yellow card) 70'; Fuenmayor (yellow card) 80'; Margaritha 84'	Stadium: Segra Field; Attendance: 1,890; Referee: Jeremy Scheer

September 6 26	Louisville City FC	1–0	Loudoun United FC	Louisville, Kentucky
7:30 PM	McFadden 52'; Davila (yellow card) 57'; Adams (yellow card) 88'	Report		Stadium: Lynn Family Stadium; Attendance: 8,207; Referee: Ricardo Montero Araya; Assistant referees: Andrew Charron; Jake Brochu; Fourth official: Alexander Adkins
Note: Match was delayed to 8:36 PM local time due to lightning. A red card was shown to Louisville's Bench.

September 14 27	Loudoun United FC	4-2	Birmingham Legion FC	Leesburg, Virginia
7:00 PM	Hughes (yellow card) 36'; Erlandson 48'; Johnston 56'; Ryan 69'; Williamson 78'; Valot 90'	Report	Crognale 15'; Martínez (yellow card) 19'; McCartney (yellow card) 62'; Nwegbo 63'	Stadium: Segra Field; Attendance: 3,120; Referee: Muhammad Hassan

September 22 28	New Mexico United	1-0	Loudoun United FC	Albuquerque, New Mexico
4:00 PM	Hughes 9' (o.g.); Ryden (yellow card) 22'; Seymore (yellow card) 31'	Report	Awuah (yellow card) 31'; Leggett (yellow card) 31'; Leerman (yellow card) 42'; Erlandson (yellow card) 85'; Williamson (yellow card) 90+1'	Stadium: Isotopes Park; Referee: Ekaterina Koroleva

September 28 29	Colorado Springs Switchbacks FC	1-1	Loudoun United FC	Colorado Springs, Colorado
8:00 PM	Zandi 2' (yellow card) 45+3'	Report	Leerman (yellow card) 45+1'; Awuah (yellow card) 52'; McCabe (yellow card) 58'; Johnston (yellow card) 86'; ElMedkhar 90+7' (yellow card) 90+8'	Stadium: Weidner Field; Attendance: 8,023; Referee: Servando Berna Rico

October 5 31	Hartford Athletic	0-2	Loudoun United	Hartford, Connecticut
7:00 PM	Makangila (yellow card) 73'; Vancaeyezeele (yellow card) 77'; Mamadou (yellow card) 90+9'; Farrell (yellow card) 90+9'	Report	Bidois (yellow card) 49'; Valot (yellow card) 56'; Tingey 74'; Leggett 83'; ElMedkhar (yellow card) 90'; Aboukoura (yellow card) 90+9'; Leerman (yellow card) 90+9'	Stadium: Trinity Health Stadium; Attendance: 5,500; Referee: Joe Surgan

October 8 31	Loudoun United	0–1	Indy Eleven	Leesburg, VA
7:00 PM	Johnston (yellow card) 16'; Fauroux (yellow card) 53'; Leerman (yellow card) 58'; Tingey (yellow card) 63'	Report	Martínez (yellow card) 53'; Mines (yellow card) 67'; Musa 83'; Diz Pe (red card) 85'	Stadium: Segra Field; Attendance: 1,787; Referee: Abdou Ndiaye

October 13 32	Rhode Island FC	0–0	Loudoun United FC	Smithfield, Rhode Island
4:00 PM	Williams (yellow card) 37'; Herivaux (yellow card) 43'	Report	Aboukoura (yellow card) 27'; Skundrich (yellow card) 40'; McCabe (yellow card) 51'	Stadium: Beirne Stadium; Attendance: 4,179; Referee: Jeremy Scheer

October 19 33	Loudoun United FC	0-2	Pittsburgh Riverhounds SC	Leesburg, Virginia
6:00PM EST	Awuah (yellow card) 23'; McCabe (yellow card) 44'; Tingey (yellow card) 86'	Report	Suber (yellow card) 23'; Kizza 33'; Jacquesson 59'; Forbes (yellow card) 90+1'; Rovira (yellow card) 90+3'	Stadium: Segra Field; Attendance: 4,589; Referee: Alejo Calume

October 26, 2024 34	Charleston Battery	2-1	Loudoun United FC	Mount Pleasant, SC
7:00 PM	Smith (yellow card) 43'; Molloy (yellow card) 45+2'; Torres 51'; Rodríguez 68'	Report	Awuah 61'; Erlandson (yellow card) 85'	Stadium: Patriots Point Soccer Complex; Attendance: 3,486; Referee: Brandon Stevis

=== U.S. Open Cup ===
==== Match results ====
April 17 Third Round	Richmond Kickers (USL1) (Virginia)	0–0 (a.e.t.) (4–5 p)	(Virginia) Loudoun United FC (USLC)	Richmond, Virginia
7:00 PM EDT		Report		Stadium: City Stadium; Referee: David Elliott

May 7 Round of 32	Orange County SC (California)	1–2	(Virginia) Loudoun United FC	Irvine, California
19:00 PDT	Amang 62'		Leggett 22', 64'	Stadium: Championship Soccer Stadium; Attendance: 1,749

May 21 Round of 16	Los Angeles FC (California)	3–0	(Virginia) Loudoun United FC	Los Angeles, California
19:30 PDT	Tillman 8'; Palencia (yellow card) 38'; Olivera 52'; Campos (yellow card) 56'; Ángel 61'	Report	Legget (yellow card) 18'; Dambrot (yellow card) 41'	Stadium: BMO Stadium; Referee: Geoff Cameron

== Statistics ==
=== Top scorers ===
Rank	Position	No.	Name	USLC	US Open Cup	Total
1	FW	14	(United States) Zach Ryan	9	0	9
1	FW	7	(United States) Wesley Leggett	7	2	9
3	FW	30	(Egypt) Abdellatif Aboukoura	5	0	5
3	MF	10	(United States) Kalil ElMedkhar	5	0	5
5	MF	8	(France) Florian Valot	3	0	3
6	FW	15	(New Zealand) Riley Bidois	2	0	2
7	4 players with 1 goal					
Total				35	2	37

- Last updated: August 18, 2024
- Source: Loudoun United FC Player Stats

== See also ==
- 2024 D.C. United season
