= Robert Rich =

Robert Rich may refer to:

== Nobility ==
- Robert Rich, 2nd Baron Rich (c. 1537–1581)
- Robert Rich, 1st Earl of Warwick (1559–1619), English nobleman
- Robert Rich, 2nd Earl of Warwick (1587–1658), English naval officer and politician
- Robert Rich, 3rd Earl of Warwick (1611–1659)
- Robert Rich, 5th Earl of Warwick (c. 1619–1675)
- Sir Robert Rich, 2nd Baronet (c. 1648–1699), English member of parliament and a Lord of the Admiralty
- Sir Robert Rich, 4th Baronet (1685–1768), British field marshal
- Sir Robert Rich, 5th Baronet (1717–1785), British general

== Others ==
- Robert Rich (Bermuda settler) (1585–1630), English soldier and adventurer
- Robert F. Rich (1883–1968), politician from Pennsylvania
- Robert E. Rich Sr. (1913–2006), inventor of non-dairy whipped topping, founder of Rich Products
- Robert E. Rich (1926–2025), American intelligence official
- Robert G. Rich Jr. (born 1930), U.S. ambassador to Belize
- Robert E. Rich Jr. (born 1941), chairman of Rich Products Corporation
- Robert R. Rich (born 1941), professor of medicine, microbiology and medical education
- Robert Rich (musician) (born 1963), American ambient musician
- Robert Rich, the Oscar-winning pseudonym used by Dalton Trumbo (born 1905)
