= Spire City Ghost Hounds =

Baseball team in Frederick, Maryland, US

Logo
Cap insignia

Information
- League: Atlantic League of Professional Baseball (South Division)
- Location: Frederick, Maryland
- Ballpark: Nymeo Field at Harry Grove Stadium
- Founded: 2023
- Former name: Frederick ALPB (2023)
- Colors: Teal, light teal, black, metallic copper
- Mascot: Freddie the Ghost Hound
- Ownership: Attain Sports and Entertainment
- Management: Chuck Domino, Senior Vice President of Baseball Operations; Mary Nixon, Executive Director of Baseball Operations
- Manager: Mark Minicozzi
- Website: goghosthounds.com

The Spire City Ghost Hounds are an inactive professional baseball team based in Frederick, Maryland, that played in 2023. The franchise competed in the South Division of the Atlantic League of Professional Baseball and played home games at Nymeo Field at Harry Grove Stadium, sharing the ballpark with the Frederick Keys. Following the 2023 season, the team has been on hiatus.

== History ==
The team's creation was announced in November 2022. The team held a name-the-team contest in January and February 2023, with the name to be announced in June 2023 from the choices of Bone Shakers, Ghost Hounds, Rail Frogs, Sawbones, and Screaming Alpacas. Until then, the team's hats and jerseys featured question marks in place of a name. The team name was announced as Spire City Ghost Hounds on June 24.

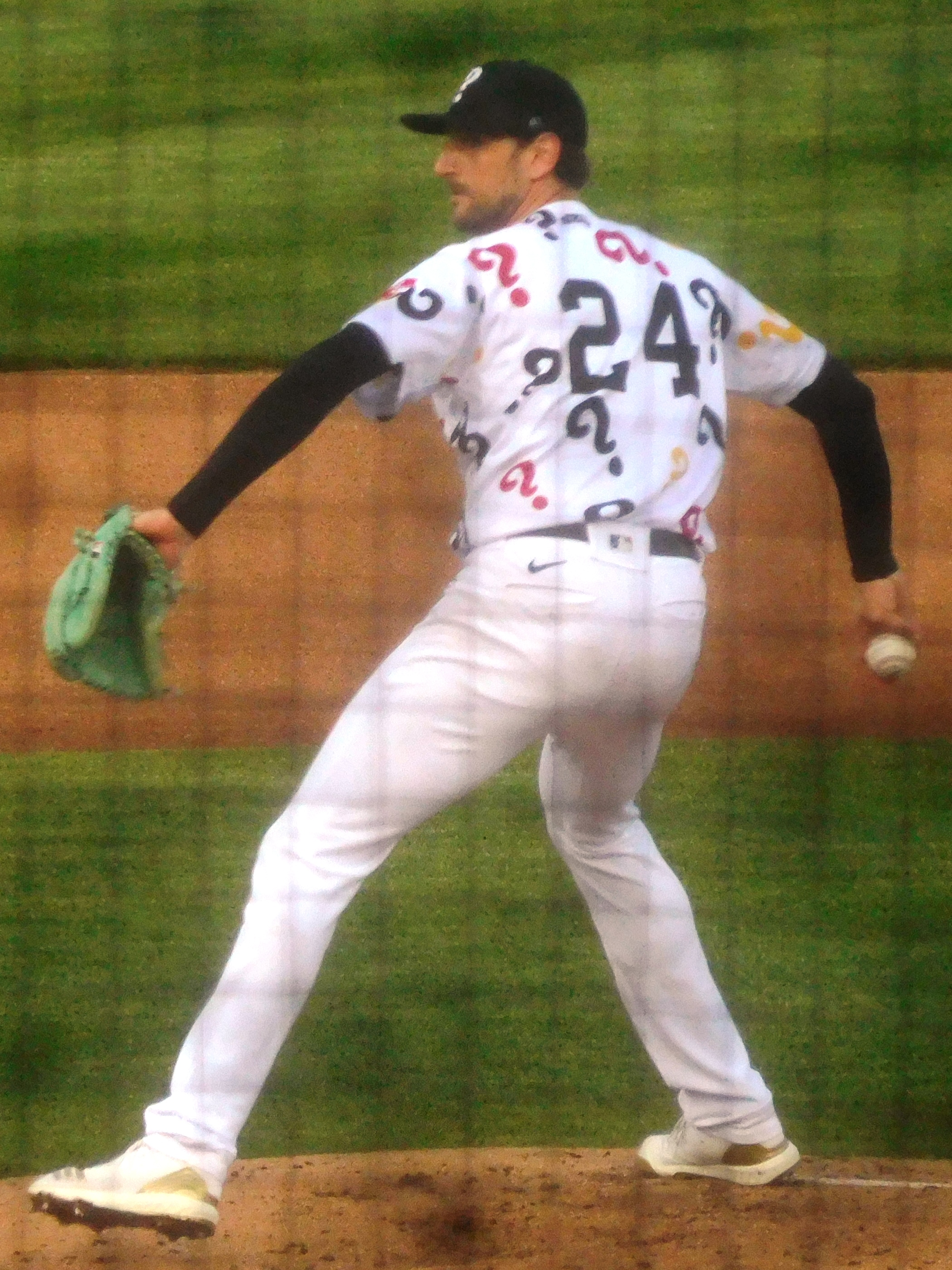
David Kubiak pitching in the team's initial uniform, May 12, 2023.

The team lost its inaugural game 10–4 on April 28, 2023, at CaroMont Health Park in Gastonia, North Carolina, to the Gastonia Honey Hunters. Their first home game was a 4–2 loss on May 2, 2023, to the Lexington Counter Clocks.

In September 2023, the team announced they would go on hiatus for the 2024 season, sitting out one season until the Atlantic League expanded to 12 teams. The Ghost Hounds were not listed on the 2025 season schedule and later announced an extension of the hiatus through the 2025 season. The Ghost Hounds were not listed on the 2026 season schedule and extended their hiatus through the 2026 season.

== Roster ==
Spire City Ghost Hounds Roster
Active (25-man) Roster	Coaching Staff
Pitchers: TBD; Catchers: TBD; Infielders: TBD; Outfielders: TBD	Manager: TBD; Coaches: TBD; Disabled list; ‡ Inactive list; >§ Suspended list; updated April 18, 2024 Transactions

== Management ==
The team is owned by Attain Sports and Entertainment, which also owns the Chesapeake Baysox, the Aberdeen IronBirds, the Frederick Keys, and Loudoun United FC. The team's 2023 front office staff was Chuck Domino, Senior Vice President of Baseball Operations, and Mary Nixon, executive director of Baseball Operations. The team's 2023 coaching staff was manager Mark Minicozzi, hitting coach Aharon Eggleston, and pitching coach Elih Villanueva, who also pitched for the team as a player-coach.

== See also ==
- Sports in Washington, D.C.
