= Rich Products =

American food corporation

Rich Products Corporation
- Type: Private
- Industry: Food & Drink
- Founded: 1945; 81 years ago
- Founder: Robert E. Rich, Sr.
- Headquarters: Buffalo, New York, U.S.
- Number of locations: 20 plants (1997), sales in more than 85 countries (2006)
- Area served: Worldwide
- Key people: Robert E. Rich Jr. (Chairman); Richard Ferranti (CEO); Melinda R. Rich (Vice Chairman)
- Services: Foodservice; Foodservice Supplier
- Revenue: ▲US$ 5 billion (2023)
- Number of employees: 11,000 (2017)
- Website: richs.com

Rich Products Corporation (also known as Rich's) is an American privately held multinational food products corporation headquartered in Buffalo, New York. The company was founded in 1945 by Robert E. Rich, Sr., after his development of a non-dairy whipped topping based on soybean oil, 21 years before Cool Whip. Since then, the company has expanded its non-dairy frozen food offerings and also supplies products to retailers, bakeries, and foodservice providers.

Rich's employs 11,000 employees worldwide, with manufacturing facilities in many countries. The company sells more than 2,000 products in 112 countries. It currently ranks number 116 on Forbes' list of America's Largest Private Companies.

In addition to Farm Rich, the company sells products under other brands it has acquired, such as SeaPak, French Meadow, Casa Di Bertacchi, Byron's Barbecue; Carvel, F'real and Jon Donaire. CoffeeRich is one of the company's few exceptions, with nearly all of its products not being sold under the Rich brand name.

== Company history ==
=== 1940s ===
Rich's began in 1945, when Robert E. Rich, Sr. created a cream less expensive than dairy-based whipped cream and lasted longer in the refrigerator, and could reportedly "remain frozen for more than a year without degrading."

=== 1950s ===
In 1954, the company introduced the first commercial line of frozen éclairs and crème puffs.

=== 1960s ===
Rich's expanded further, introducing CoffeeRich, a non-dairy frozen creamer in 1961. The company also constructed a manufacturing plant in Fort Erie, Ontario, Canada, the following year. This facility is now known as Rich Products of Canada, Ltd. The acquisition of Elm Tree Baking Co., in 1969 expanded Rich's products to include frozen baked goods.

=== 1970s ===
Rich's acquired nine new production facilities, as well as SeaPak, a St. Simons, Georgia based company that produces frozen seafood specialties. In 1973, they bought the rights to rename the Buffalo Bills stadium to Rich Stadium for 25 years (a total cost of $1.5 million).

=== 1980s ===
In 1980, Rich's introduced Freeze-Flo, a process allowing foods to remain soft while frozen. It also introduced another product, On Top, a non-dairy dessert topping, in 1986. Rich's also expanded its product line through the acquisition of Casa Di Bertacchi, a specialty meat and frozen pasta producer, in 1982, and Byron's, a barbecue and meat producer, in 1986.

=== 1990s ===
During the 1990s, Rich's expanded internationally, opening facilities in Mexico, London, Singapore, Hong Kong, Tokyo, and Australia, among others.

In 1997 the company was described as a "20-plant, $1 billion global food-processing corporation."

=== 2000s ===
Since 2000, Rich's has acquired a number of companies, including frozen dessert and bakery mix producer JW Allen & Co., Jon Donaire Desserts, and donut producer Rolling Pin Manufacturing. Rich's integration of French Meadow Bakery and acquisition of World Catch LLC (all-natural seafood) and GLP Manufacturing (gluten-free baked goods) entered the company into the health and wellness food sector.

In 2005, the company celebrated 60 years as a family-owned company with the "60 Delicious Years" worldwide birthday party on March 14. As part of the celebration, Rich's renovated lunch and break rooms at all of its manufacturing sites and launched an employee recognition program.

With over 2,000 products sold in "more than 85 countries," 2005 sales worldwide was $2.5 billion.

=== 2010s ===
On August 23, 2013, Rich's celebrated the 50th anniversary of its Fort Erie, Ontario plant.

On June 24, 2014, Rich's unveiled its new Innovation Center and Atrium @ Rich's. On 1 January, 2020, Richard Ferranti became the new CEO of Rich's.

=== 2020s ===
in January 2020, Rich's announced the acquisition of two manufacturing plants from TreeHouse Foods, followed by two other acquisitions in February; Rizzuto Foods, which manufactures pizza products, and Morey's Seafood International, a Minnesota-based seafood processing and distribution company.

In July 2021, Rich Products announced the acquisition of Signature Breads.

== Product portfolio ==
Rich's offers a variety of products, including toppings and icings; sweet goods; finished desserts; appetizers; bread and rolls; pizza products; Italian specialties; barbecue; and shrimp and seafood.

In addition to the Rich's brand (Farm Rich), the company mostly sells products under other brands it has acquired, such as SeaPak; French Meadow, Casa Di Bertacchi; Byron's Barbecue; Carvel, f'real and Jon Donaire. CoffeeRich is one of the company's few exceptions; nearly all of its products are "sold not under the Rich brand name."

=== Legal battles ===
Dairy manufacturers filed multiple lawsuits against Rich's. Some of the company's early-day advertising used the term "coffee whitener" rather than non-dairy to avoid pushback from dairy manufacturers. Rich Products was sued in 36 states according to the founder's older son Robert E. Rich Jr. Eventually, his father's "court victories played an important role in legitimizing nondairy products."

== Controversies and animal welfare ==
Rich's is under scrutiny for alleged practices compromising animal welfare and food safety. Leading this charge is UK-based Equitas, launching a campaign to inform Rich's customers of these concerns. Of particular concern is Rich's continued use of battery cage eggs, a practice criticized worldwide for its cruelty and food safety risks including in the EU Directive 1999/74/EC, as hens endure deplorable conditions, feces accumulate near the eggs, and deceased hens often decompose near those still laying eggs for human consumption. Amid a global shift towards more humane practices in the food industry, Rich's faces increasing pressure to adopt a timeline for exclusively using cage-free eggs in all its operations.

== Sports ==
In 1972, Rich Products signed a 25-year deal for the naming rights to the Buffalo Bills' new stadium, which was under construction in Orchard Park. The Robert E. Rich family reportedly at one point suggested calling the stadium Coffee Rich Park.

From 1973 to 1998 this stadium was known as Rich Stadium. When the original deal expired in 1998 and Rich chose not to renew at a much higher rate, the stadium was renamed in honor of Ralph C. Wilson, the Bills' owner and founder.

Rich's owns three minor league baseball teams, most notably the Buffalo Bisons, Triple-A International League affiliate of the Toronto Blue Jays. The other two teams are the Northwest Arkansas Naturals (Double-A affiliate of the Kansas City Royals), and the West Virginia Black Bears (formerly the Jamestown Jammers, the Single-A Short Season affiliate of the Pittsburgh Pirates), a Collegiate summer baseball team of the MLB Draft League. The Black Bears have the most all-time championships the MLB Draft League, which has been around since 2021, and the Black Bears already having 3 championships (2022, 2023, and 2025.

On November 4, 2010, Bob Rich announced that Rich Products would be the official kit sponsor of English Northern League Division One team Bedlington Terriers F.C.

In 2013, Rich's Farm Rich brand became a sponsor for Front Row Motorsports' David Ragan in the NASCAR Sprint Cup Series. Farm Rich also served as Ragan's sponsor at Richmond International Raceway in the 2013 Federated Auto Parts 400. FarmRich came back on in 2014 to sponsor Ragan again for three races at Phoenix, Daytona, and Atlanta.
