= Alan Mills (baseball) =

American professional baseball player (born 1966)

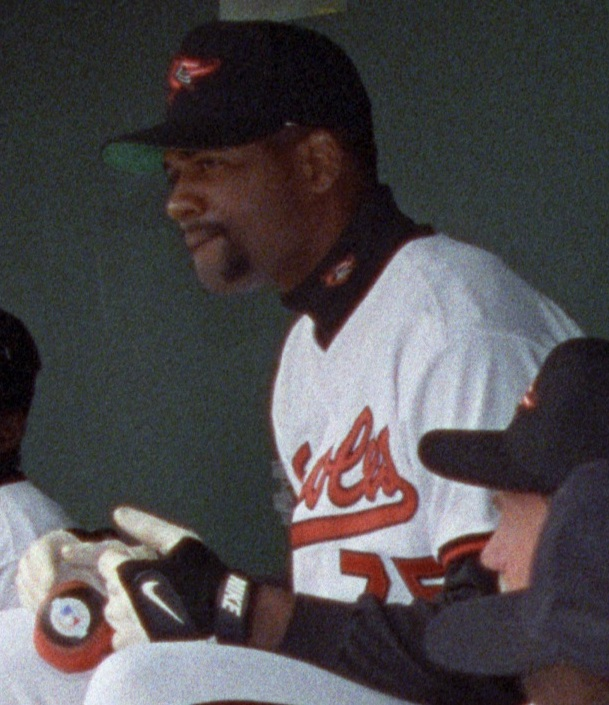
- Mills with the Baltimore Orioles in 1993
- Pitcher
- Born: October 18, 1966 (age 60); Lakeland, Florida, U.S.
- Batted: Right Threw: Right

MLB debut
- April 14, 1990, for the New York Yankees

Last MLB appearance
- October 5, 2001, for the Baltimore Orioles

MLB statistics
- Win–loss record: 39–32
- Earned run average: 4.12
- Strikeouts: 456
- Stats at Baseball Reference

Teams
- New York Yankees (1990–1991); Baltimore Orioles (1992–1998); Los Angeles Dodgers (1999–2000); Baltimore Orioles (2000–2001)

Alan Bernard Mills (born October 18, 1966) is an American former relief pitcher and pitching coach. He spent 12 seasons in Major League Baseball (MLB) with the New York Yankees (1990–1991), Baltimore Orioles (1992–1998, 2000–2001) and Los Angeles Dodgers (1999–2000). He pitched right-handed.

== Early years ==
Born in Lakeland, Florida, on October 18, 1966, Mills was the youngest of Hugh and Alfreddia Mills' four children. His favorite sport in his youth was football, but he switched to baseball after doctors informed him that he had only one kidney. He graduated from Kathleen High School in 1984. He was an outfielder on the school's varsity team before making the transition to pitcher. He attended Tuskegee University, but transferred to Polk Community College after one year when the former dropped baseball scholarships.

He was selected in the MLB draft on two occasions in 1986, both times in phases that were discontinued later that year. He was chosen by the Boston Red Sox (13th overall) and California Angels (8th overall) in the first rounds of the regular phase of the January draft and the secondary phase of the June draft respectively. He decided to sign with the Angels over the Red Sox based on which team was willing to finance his final two years of college.

Mills spent just one season with the Salem Angels of the Northwest League, compiling a 6–6 record over fourteen starts, before the Angels sent him to the New York Yankees to complete a December 19, 1986, deal in which the Yankees sent Butch Wynegar to the Angels for Ron Romanick and a player to be named later.

== New York Yankees ==
Mills converted to a relief pitcher during his three seasons in the Yankees' farm system, going 12–24 with a 4.25 ERA and thirteen saves. With the Prince William Cannons of the Class A Carolina League in 1989, Mills went 6–1 with a 0.91 ERA and seven saves to lead his team to their first Carolina League title. Though he had never pitched above A ball, his performance earned him and invitation to Spring training in 1990.

He made his major league debut on April 14, pitching 2.2 scoreless innings against the Texas Rangers. Mills went 1–5 with a 4.15 ERA his rookie year splitting his time between the Yankees and triple A Columbus Clippers. For Columbus, he was 3–3 with a 3.38 ERA and six saves.

Mills spent most of 1991 in the minors. He made two starts upon returning to the club in September. During Spring training the following season, he was traded to the Baltimore Orioles for a player to be named later.

As of 2024, Mills is the only Yankee to wear number 69 in a regular season game.

== Baltimore Orioles ==
Mills emerged as a valuable member of the Orioles' bullpen upon his arrival in Baltimore. He went 10–4 with a 2.61 ERA over 103.1 innings in 1992.

Mills made a team high 72 appearances in 1998, going 3–4 with a 3.74 ERA. Perhaps the most famous moment of Mills' career came on May 19, 1998, when he gave Darryl Strawberry a right cross that bloodied his face in the dugout during a bench clearing brawl with the New York Yankees at Yankee Stadium. Strawberry had just hit Mills' teammate Armando Benítez during a melee, and Mills responded by punching Strawberry.

The following season, Mills signed as a free agent with the Los Angeles Dodgers. After a season and a half in Los Angeles, he was dealt back to the Orioles for Alberto Reyes. He remained with the Orioles through 2001 before being released. In a 12-season career, Mills posted a 39–32 record with 456 strikeouts and a 4.12 ERA in 474 games.

Mills wore jersey number 75 with the Orioles. At the time, numbers that high were typically only worn by players in spring training (when teams have considerably larger rosters than they do during the regular season). Mills chose to wear it as a motivating factor, to remind himself that his job was not necessarily any more secure than that of someone in spring training should he perform poorly.

== Erie SeaWolves ==
Mills attempted comebacks with the Montreal Expos in Spring training 2002 and the Tampa Bay Devil Rays in 2004, but was essentially away from the game for five years before signing a minor league deal with the Detroit Tigers in 2007, and spending one season with their AA affiliate, the Erie SeaWolves. In his first 27 games, he went 23-for-23 in save opportunities, posting a 2.79 ERA and limiting batters to a .154 batting average.

== Post-retirement ==
Mills returned to his alma mater Kathleen High School as a physical education teacher and head coach of its varsity baseball team from 2009 through 2011. It was also during that time that he earned a Bachelor of Arts degree in psychology from Ashford University in 2009. He has also served as a pitching coach in the New York–Penn League for the Oneonta Tigers in 2008.

His return to the Orioles organization in 2012 began a five-year span as pitching coach with the Aberdeen IronBirds (2012–2013), Delmarva Shorebirds (2014) and Bowie Baysox (2015–2016). His 2012 and 2013 seasons with the IronBirds were the subject of a 2021 memoir called Clubbie from the team's clubhouse attendant, Greg Larson. His 2015 campaign with Bowie was the first time the Baysox captured the Eastern League Championship. After two seasons as the Orioles' bullpen coach in 2017 and 2018, he was announced as the manager of the GCL Orioles on February 8, 2019. Despite the Gulf Coast League cancelling its playoffs due to the threat of Hurricane Dorian, Mills was named Manager of the Year after guiding the Orioles to a league-best 38–15 record in his first full season at the helm. Team records were established or matched in winning percentage (.717) and wins respectively, with the latter tying the 2011 GCL Orioles. On October 4, 2021, the Orioles made numerous changes, with Mills among those fired by the Baltimore organization.
