= Matt Merullo =

American baseball player (born 1965)

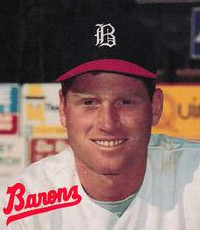
- Merullo in 1988
- Catcher
- Born: August 4, 1965 (age 60); Winchester, Massachusetts, U.S.
- Batted: Left Threw: Right

MLB debut
- April 12, 1989, for the Chicago White Sox

Last MLB appearance
- September 29, 1995, for the Minnesota Twins

MLB statistics
- Batting average: .234
- Home runs: 7
- Runs batted in: 59
- Stats at Baseball Reference

Teams
- Chicago White Sox (1989, 1991–1993); Cleveland Indians (1994); Minnesota Twins (1995)

Matthew Bates Merullo (born August 4, 1965) is an American former Major League Baseball (MLB) catcher who played for the Chicago White Sox, Cleveland Indians, and Minnesota Twins between 1989 and 1995. Born in Winchester, Massachusetts, he is the grandson of MLB player Lennie Merullo.

Merullo attended the University of North Carolina, playing on the school's baseball team for three years, and in 1984 he played collegiate summer baseball with the Harwich Mariners of the Cape Cod Baseball League. During his time at North Carolina, he played in a U.S.–Japan exhibition series, and in the second game of the 1985 series hit a walk-off grand slam, the first in the series' history at that time. He was selected by the Chicago White Sox in the 7th round of the 1986 Major League Baseball draft, and began his professional career with the Peninsula White Sox, finishing the year with a .303 batting average in 64 games. Merullo spent the next three seasons making his way up the White Sox farm system, primarily playing for the Birmingham Barons. The plan was for Merullo to start the 1989 season with the Triple-A Vancouver Canadians, but Carlton Fisk broke his hand, and as a result Merullo was brought up to the major league roster after four games.

Merullo made his major league debut on April 12, 1989, and played in 31 games for the White Sox before returning to the minor leagues, playing in 67 total games between MLB, Triple-A, and Double-A. He spent most of 1990 and 1991 with Birmingham, he returned to the White Sox partway through the season, finishing the year with a .229 batting average in 80 games. He played in 14 games for the White Sox in 1992, seeing little playing time both due to being behind Fisk and Ron Karkovice in the catching order as well as needing elbow surgery, missing most of the 1992 season as a result. While he played in 8 games for the White Sox in 1993, he spent most of the season with the Nashville Sounds, hitting .332 in 103 games. At the start of the 1994 season, Merullo was traded to the Cleveland Indians for Ken Ramos. He played in four games for the Indians and spent most of the season with the Triple-A Charlotte Knights. He joined the Minnesota Twins in 1995 and had his most productive season, hitting .282 in 76 games for the team. After spending 1996 in the minor leagues, Merullo retired from baseball and became a scout for the Arizona Diamondbacks.

In 2013 and 2014, Merullo served as the manager for the Aberdeen IronBirds, the Baltimore Orioles single-A affiliate in the now-defunct New York-Penn League. Merullo was featured in a 2021 memoir called Clubbie from the IronBirds' clubhouse attendant, Greg Larson.
