= Robert E. Rich Sr. =

American businessman (1913–2006)

Robert E. Rich Sr. (July 7, 1913 – February 15, 2006) was a food processing pioneer and executive. During World War II, he invented the first non-dairy whipped topping made from soybeans that could be frozen.

Born in Buffalo, New York, he founded Rich Products in 1945, which had sales of $2.5 billion on more than 2,300 products in 2005, the year before he died at age 92 in Palm Beach, Florida. His son, Robert Jr., inherited the company and is the owner of the Buffalo Bisons minor league baseball team.

== Biography ==
Rich attended Bennett High School in Buffalo, where his father, Pal Rich, owned an ice cream plant. He received his undergraduate education from the University at Buffalo, where he was captain of both football and wrestling. He was also a member of Alpha Kappa Psi and Bisonhead, an all-male secret society on campus. He was later inducted into the University at Buffalo, The State University of New York Athletic Hall of Fame.

After borrowing money from his father, he started the Wilbur Dairy Company (later renamed the Jones-Rich Milk Company) in 1935. The success of his cream substitute brought a series of lawsuits from the dairy industry in an effort to stop distribution of his product. Rich prevailed in every case. At his death, he was one of the wealthiest people in the world, reportedly worth $2 billion, and his company was the largest family-owned food products company in America.

== Sports properties ==
Rich owned three minor league baseball teams, most notably the Buffalo Bisons, Triple-A International League affiliate of the Toronto Blue Jays. The other two teams are the Northwest Arkansas Naturals (Double-A affiliate of the Kansas City Royals), and the West Virginia Black Bears (formerly the Jamestown Jammers, the Single-A Short Season affiliate of the Pittsburgh Pirates).

His older son continued this, and added some sponsorships:

- On November 4, 2010, Bob Rich announced that Rich Products shall be the official kit sponsor of the English Northern League Division One team Bedlington Terriers F.C.
- In 2013, Rich's Farm Rich brand became sponsor for Front Row Motorsports' David Ragan in the NASCAR Sprint Cup Series, and in its first race as sponsor, Ragan won the 2013 Aaron's 499 at Talladega Superspeedway; Farm Rich again served as Ragan's sponsor at Richmond International Raceway in the 2013 Federated Auto Parts 400.

== Rich's ==
Due to pressure from the dairy industry, Rich Products was sued in 36 states, the founder's older son Robert E. Rich Jr. said, and won 40 out of 41 cases. The company's CoffeeRich product, marketed with a series of national ads featuring George Burns, did well: "its sales soared, particularly among Jews who kept kosher and were forbidden to put cream in their coffee while eating meat."

"The elder Rich was considered one of the founding fathers of the frozen food industry" is how a local business newspaper summarized his business success.

== Sources and external links ==
- http://www.richs.com/roberterich/roberterich.html
- http://richs.com/about/rer.asp
- http://www.wealthiest1000.com/people/RobertERich.htm
- Greater Buffalo Sports Hall of Fame
- http://www.wgrz.com/news/news_article.aspx?storyid=35436
- http://www.buffaloathome.com/Sports.aspx
- http://www.hbs.edu/leadership/database/leaders/754/
- http://www.nytimes.com/2006/02/17/business/17richOBT.html
- http://www.economist.com/displaystory.cfm?story_id=5545266
