= MLB Draft League =

Collegiate summer baseball league

- Classification: Collegiate summer (partial); Independent (partial)
- Sport: Baseball
- Founded: 2021
- Director: Sean Campbell
- No. of teams: 6
- Country: United States
- Most recent champion: Williamsport Crosscutters (2026)
- Most titles: West Virginia Black Bears (3)
- Streaming partner: AWRE Sports
- Website: mlbdraftleague.com

The MLB Draft League is a baseball league that began play in 2021. Created by Major League Baseball (MLB) and Prep Baseball Report (PBR), the league operates a split-season format of 80 games with a hybrid amateur–professional structure: for the first half of the season, the league operates as an amateur collegiate summer baseball league to serve as a showcase for top draft-eligible prospects leading up to each July's MLB draft; after a break for the draft, play resumes for the season's remaining games with paid professional players who have exhausted their amateur eligibility.

== History ==
The league's founding six teams were formerly members of Minor League Baseball's New York–Penn League, Eastern League, and Carolina League before MLB's reorganization of the minors for 2021. In 2021, each team in the league played a 68-game regular season, with an All-Star Break taking place around the MLB draft. The season was expanded to 80 games per team beginning in 2022.

In 2024, MLB announced that the league would be expanded by two teams in the near future and that it would extend its support for the league through 2030.

In August 2025, it was announced that Attain Sports and Entertainment, the owners of the Frederick Keys and numerous Baltimore Orioles minor league affiliates, would move the current Keys team to High-A, while the Aberdeen Ironbirds, the then-current High-A affiliate of the Orioles would move to the MLB Draft League in 2026.

== Teams ==
Team	City	Stadium	Capacity	Tenure
Aberdeen IronBirds	Aberdeen, Maryland	Ripken Stadium	6,300	2026–present
Mahoning Valley Scrappers	Niles, Ohio	7 17 Credit Union Field at Eastwood	6,000	2021–present
State College Spikes	University Park, Pennsylvania	Lubrano Park	5,570	2021–present
Trenton Thunder	Trenton, New Jersey	Trenton Thunder Ballpark	6,440	2021–present
West Virginia Black Bears	Granville, West Virginia	Kendrick Family Ballpark	3,500	2021–present
Williamsport Crosscutters	Williamsport, Pennsylvania	Journey Bank Ballpark	2,366	2021–present

Locations of teams for the 2027 season.

=== Champions ===
Team	# of Championships	Year(s)
West Virginia Black Bears	3	2022, 2023, 2025
Williamsport Crosscutters	2	2024, 2026
Trenton Thunder	1	2021 (Note: Trenton was awarded the 2021 title for having the best regular season record.)

=== Championship games ===
Year	Champion	Runner-up	Score	Ref
2026	Williamsport Crosscutters	Aberdeen Ironbirds	5–3	
2025	West Virginia Black Bears	State College Spikes	12–5	
2024	Williamsport Crosscutters	Trenton Thunder	5–4	
2023	West Virginia Black Bears	Trenton Thunder	9–4	
2022	West Virginia Black Bears	Williamsport Crosscutters	10–6	
2021	Not held			

=== Owners ===
Team	Owner(s)	Principal	Year acquired
Aberdeen IronBirds	Attain Sports and Entertainment (majority), Ripken family (minority)	Greg Baroni (CEO) (majority); Cal Ripken Jr. and Billy Ripken (minority)	2024
Mahoning Valley Scrappers	HWS Group	Michael Savit	
State College Spikes	State College Professional Baseball LP	Chuck Greenberg	2006
Trenton Thunder	Diamond Baseball Holdings	Pat Battle, Peter B. Freund	2026
West Virginia Black Bears	Rich Baseball Operations	Bob Rich, Jr.	2014
Williamsport Crosscutters	Trinity Sports Holdings	Peter B. Freund	2014
