= Tommy McCabe =

American soccer player (born 1998)

Personal information
- Full name: Thomas McCabe
- Date of birth: April 4, 1998 (age 28)
- Place of birth: South Orange, New Jersey, U.S.
- Height: 5 ft 11 in (1.80 m)
- Position: Defensive midfielder

Youth career
- 2013–2015: IMG Academy

College career
Years	Team	Apps	(Gls)
2016–2018	Notre Dame Fighting Irish	61	(0)

Senior career*
Years	Team	Apps	(Gls)
2016	Baltimore Bohemians	4	(0)
2019–2020	FC Cincinnati	7	(0)
2019	→ North Carolina FC (loan)	9	(2)
2020	→ Memphis 901 (loan)	7	(0)
2021–2022	Orange County SC	59	(1)
2023	Detroit City	11	(0)
2023	FC Tulsa	15	(0)
2024–2025	Loudoun United	63	(1)
2026–	Oakland Roots	28	(0)
- * Club domestic league appearances and goals as of 10:56, 10 November 2026 (UTC)

Thomas McCabe (born April 4, 1998) is an American professional soccer player who plays for Oakland Roots SC in the USL Championship.

== Career ==
=== Youth and college ===
McCabe played three years of college soccer at the University of Notre Dame between 2016 and 2018, making 61 appearances and tallying 4 assists.

While at college, McCabe appeared for USL Premier Development League side Baltimore Bohemians in 2016. He played 341 minutes across 4 appearances and had no goals or assists.

=== Professional ===
On January 11, 2019, McCabe was selected 29th overall in the 2019 MLS SuperDraft by FC Cincinnati. He signed with Cincinnati on February 7, 2019. On February 15, 2019, McCabe joined USL Championship side North Carolina FC on a season-long loan. On May 30, North Carolina FC announced McCabe was being recalled to FC Cincinnati, while also announcing that former NCFC player Nazmi Albadawi was being sent to NCFC on loan.

On August 28, 2020, McCabe was loaned to USL Championship side Memphis 901 for the remainder of the season.

He was released by Cincinnati at the end of their 2020 season. He subsequently signed with USL Championship side Orange County SC on February 10, 2021.

On March 8, 2023, McCabe signed a two-year deal with USL Championship side Detroit City. McCabe began the season with Detroit, making 11 league appearances before been traded to FC Tulsa in exchange for Brett Levis and Darío Suárez. He left Tulsa at the end of their 2023 season. He subsequently joined Loudoun United ahead of their 2024 season in the USL Championship. McCabe was released by Loudoun following their 2025 season. He was signed by the Oakland Roots for the 2026 USL Championship season, being one of the players following his head coach Ryan Martin in the move.
