= Williamsport Crosscutters =

- Founded in 1994; Williamsport, Pennsylvania
Team logo
Cap insignia

Minor league affiliations
- Class: Collegiate summer (2021–present)
- Previous classes: Class A Short Season (1994–2020)
- League: MLB Draft League (2021–present)
- Previous leagues: New York–Penn League (1994–2020)

Major league affiliations
- Team: Unaffiliated (2021–present)
- Previous teams: Philadelphia Phillies (2007–2020); Pittsburgh Pirates (1999–2006); Chicago Cubs (1994–1998)

Minor league titles
- League titles (4): 2001; 2003; 2024; 2026
- Division titles (1): 2015
- First-half titles (2): 2024; 2026
- Second-half titles (2): 2022; 2026

Team data
- Name: Williamsport Crosscutters (1999–present); Williamsport Cubs (1994–1998)
- Colors: Phillies red, navy, gray, tan, ivory, white
- Mascot: Boomer
- Ballpark: Journey Bank Ballpark at Historic Bowman Field (1994–present)
- Owner/ Operator: Peter B. Freund/Trinity Sports Holdings
- General manager: Doug Estes
- Manager: Kenny Thomas
- Website: mlbdraftleague.com/williamsport

The Williamsport Crosscutters are a collegiate summer baseball team of the MLB Draft League. They are located in Williamsport, Pennsylvania, and play their home games at Journey Bank Ballpark at Historic Bowman Field. From 1994 to 2020, they were a Minor League Baseball team of the Class A Short Season New York–Penn League until MLB's reorganization of the minors after the 2020 season. Prior to this, they were affiliates of the Chicago Cubs (1994–1998), Pittsburgh Pirates (1999–2006), and Philadelphia Phillies (2007–2020).

== History ==
Through 1993, the club was the Geneva Cubs, playing in Geneva, New York. For the 1994 season, the club moved to Williamsport, occupying a historic facility that had not been used for professional baseball for the previous two seasons. The club became known as the Williamsport Cubs, a Class A short season affiliate of the Chicago Cubs, retaining that name through 1998. In 1999, the team switched affiliations from the Chicago Cubs to the Pittsburgh Pirates and the team name became "the Crosscutters". At the end of the 2006 season, the team became an affiliate of the Philadelphia Phillies, with the Pittsburgh affiliation switching to the State College Spikes.

The Crosscutters shared the New York–Penn League championship with the Brooklyn Cyclones in 2001, after losing the first game of the series. Both teams were declared champions after the remainder of the series was canceled in the wake of the September 11, 2001 attacks. The Crosscutters again made the playoffs in 2002 but were eliminated in the first round. However, the team returned to win the championship series, against the Cyclones, in 2003.

The name "Crosscutters" reflects the logging heritage of Williamsport, once known as the "Lumber Capital of the World." The city, historically having the largest amount of millionaires per capita, is on the West Branch Susquehanna River, and logging barons once lived in mansions along Fourth Street, which became known as "Millionaires' Row". To this day, sports teams at Williamsport Area High School are known as the Millionaires.

The 2015 season saw the Williamsport Crosscutters clinch their first Pinckney Division Championship since 2001.

On September 18, 2017, the Crosscutters announced that its Player Development Contract (PDC) had been extended by the Phillies through the 2020 season. In 2017, the team's total attendance at Bowman Field was 61,082.

In conjunction with Major League Baseball's reorganization of the minors after the 2020 season, Williamsport left Minor League Baseball and became a collegiate summer baseball team of the newly created MLB Draft League, which is a showcase for draft-eligible players.

== Championships ==
In 2001, the Crosscutters and Brooklyn Cyclones were declared the New York–Penn League's co-champions. The Crosscutters lost the first game of the best of three championship series, and the rest of the series was cancelled after the September 11, 2001 attacks.

In 2003, the Crosscutters won the New York–Penn League championship outright, defeating the Cyclones in two games to sweep the series.

In 2015, the Crosscutters won the New York-Penn League Pinckney Division, posting a league best record of 46–30. The Crosscutters would be eliminated from the playoffs by the West Virginia Black Bears two games to one. The Black Bears would go on to win the 2015 New York Penn League Championship.

In 2022, the Crosscutters won the 2nd Half Championship of the MLB Draft League. The Crosscutters would go on to the MLB Draft League Championship Game, but would fall to the West Virginia Black Bears.

In 2024, the Crosscutters won the 1st Half Championship of the MLB Draft League and would host the League Championship Game. Williamsport would go on to win the 2024 MLB Draft League Championship.

In 2026, the Crosscutters won the 1st and 2nd Half Championships of the MLB Draft League and would host the League Championship Game. Williamsport would go on to win the 2026 MLB Draft League Championship.

== Playoffs ==
- 2001: Defeated Jamestown 2–1 in semifinals; declared co-champions with Brooklyn.
- 2002: Lost to Staten Island 2–0 in semifinals.
- 2003: Defeated Auburn 2–0 in semifinals; defeated Brooklyn 2–0 to win championship.
- 2005: Lost to Staten Island 2–0 in semifinals.
- 2015: Lost to West Virginia 2–1 in semifinals.
- 2022: Lost to West Virginia in winner-takes-all championship.
- 2024: Defeated Trenton in winner-takes-all championship.
- 2026: Defeated Aberdeen in winner-takes-all championship.

== Logos and uniforms ==
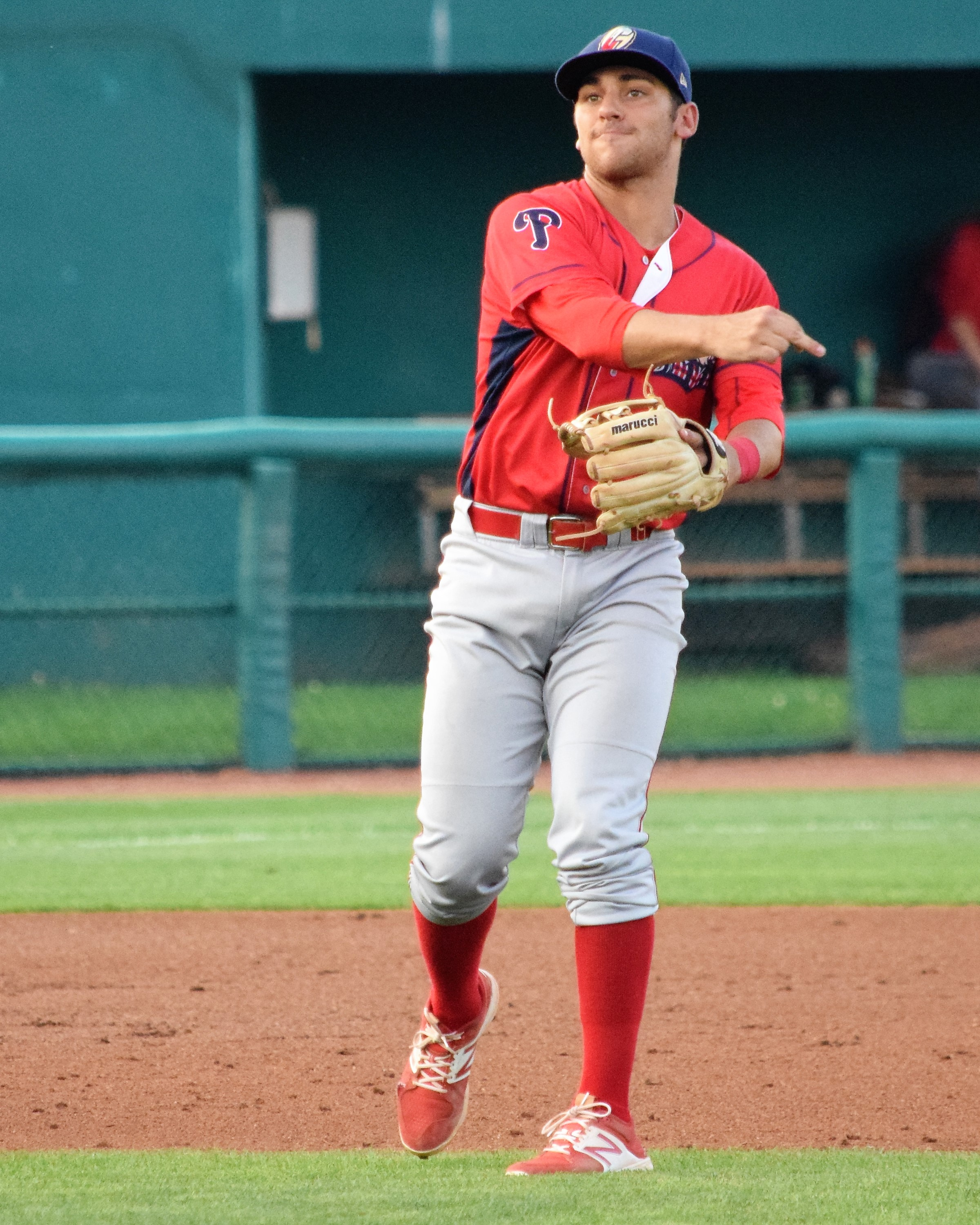
Jake Scheiner in 2017 with the Crosscutters

The official colors of the Williamsport Crosscutters are Phillies red, navy blue, gray, dark tan, and ivory. The team most recently changed its brand prior to the 2008 season, one year following an affiliation change from the Pittsburgh Pirates to the Philadelphia Phillies. The colors resemble the red, white, and blue scheme of the Phillies, but with some additional colors and minor tweaks. The former colors were burgundy and black.

The Crosscutters wear a red cap with the W-shaped saw cap logo in dark tan and ivory for home games, and a navy blue cap with a logo depicting a capital "C" superimposed over a tree stump. The home uniforms include sleeveless, white jerseys with traditional red piping and the "Cutters" wordmark in grey and red, outlined in navy blue. The number on the back is in navy blue with white and red outline. The undershirts are red, with the secondary logo centered on the left sleeve. The socks and belts are also red. The away uniforms are grey, but otherwise the same as the homes.

== Roster ==
Williamsport Crosscutters roster
Players	Coaches/Other
Pitchers: 43 Jed Boyle; 21 Cade Davis; 3 Tyler Dietz; 22 Ryan Faulks; 11 Merit Jones; 4 Josh Leerssen; 18 Jonny Lowe; 24 Cooper Markham; 32 Brad Rudis; –– Reilly Shafer; 26 Dakota Stone; 29 Sam Swygert; 39 Jared Ure; 17 Ryan Ure; Catchers: 6 Hayden Christiansen; 28 Matt Flaherty; 27 Christian Reyes; Infielders: 9 Carlos Castillo; 16 Matt Ilgenfritz; 15 Ryan Kennell; 31 Max Mandler; 13 Joey Parliment; 2 Jordan Peyton; 8 Dylan Schaefer; 14 Michael Zarrillo; Outfielders: 34 Matthew Bardowell; 35 Amman Dewberry; 5 Jack Lausch; 12 Armani Newton	Manager: 19 Kenny Thomas; Coaches: 30 Jesse Estrada (pitching); 20 Sean Miller (hitting); 7-day injured list; ~ Development list; # Rehab assignment; ∞ Reserve list; ‡ Restricted list; § Suspended list; † Temporarily inactive list; Roster updated July 11, 2025; Transactions; → More rosters: MiLB • MLB Draft League
