= Clubbie =

Baseball book

Clubbie: A Minor League Baseball Memoir
- Author: Greg Larson
- Language: English
- Subject: Minor League Baseball, Autobiography
- Genre: Non-fiction, Sports
- Publisher: University of Nebraska Press
- Publication date: April 1, 2021
- Publication place: United States
- ISBN: 1-496-22429-9
- Website: https://www.clubbiebook.com/

Clubbie: A Minor League Baseball Memoir is a non-fiction book written by Greg Larson, published by the University of Nebraska Press on April 1, 2021. The book provides a behind-the-scenes account of Larson's two seasons as the clubhouse attendant (clubbie) for the Aberdeen IronBirds, a minor League affiliate of the Baltimore Orioles.

Clubbie: A Minor League Baseball Memoir is a non-fiction book written by Greg Larson, published by the University of Nebraska Press on April 1, 2021. The book offers a humorous and candid look into the world of Minor League Baseball and explores the author's journey through professional sports, personal ambition, and self-discovery.

== Plot ==
Greg Larson, a starry-eyed baseball fan, lands a job as the clubhouse attendant for the Aberdeen IronBirds. Despite his lack of baseball talent, Larson secretly dreams of joining the team. As he discovers the strange rituals and experiences within the minor leagues, Larson finds himself drawn deeper into a role he had not anticipated: the scheming clubbie. He moves into the clubhouse equipment closet, where he orchestrates deals involving memorabilia, alcohol, and money.

During his second season, Larson becomes a more cunning and deceptive figure, exploiting the players he once considered friends. Even as his personal life suffers, Larson remains captivated by the allure of baseball. As the IronBirds face a chance at a championship, Larson is given one last opportunity for redemption.

== Characters ==
Greg Larson: Clubhouse attendant for the Aberdeen IronBirds and aspiring baseball player.

Alex Schmarzo: Pitcher with the IronBirds in 2012.

Alan Mills: Pitching coach of the IronBirds in 2012 and 2013, the seasons that Larson was with the team.

Matt Merullo: Manager of the IronBirds in 2013.

== Major themes ==
Clubbie delves into the harsh realities of professional sports, revealing the challenges faced by minor league players and staff. The book explores themes of ambition, identity, and the cost of pursuing one's dreams. Larson's journey also highlights the importance of camaraderie and self-discovery, as he navigates his dual roles as both friend and exploiter of the IronBirds players.

== Style ==
Larson's writing style is characterized by humor and vivid descriptions, giving the reader an immersive and engaging experience. The book provides a detailed account of life in Minor League Baseball, with a colorful cast of characters and a narrative that captures the spirit of the game.

== Reception and Impact ==
Larson wrote Clubbie as part of his graduate studies at Old Dominion University. The book, which details the lives of players and staff in a minor league baseball clubhouse, helped usher in significant changes in minor league player compensation.

The book has been well-received by both baseball fans and non-fans alike, with readers appreciating its unflinching look at professional sports and the humorous and engaging storytelling.
