= Steven J. Burakoff =

American academic and oncologist

- Education: Albany Medical College Queens College, City University of New York; Harvard University; Harvard Medical School; New York Hospital-Cornell Medical Center Rockefeller University
- Occupations: Professor, Researcher
- Medical career
- Profession: Physician
- Field: Oncology
- Institutions: The Tisch Cancer Institute, Icahn School of Medicine
- Sub-specialties: Hematology, Oncology
- Research: T-cells

Steven J. Burakoff is a cancer specialist and the author of both Therapeutic Immunology (2001) and Graft-Vs.-Host Disease: Immunology, Pathophysiology, and Treatment (1990). He served as Director of The Tisch Cancer Institute at Mount Sinai (2007-2017), which was created in 2007 to focus on translational medicine. He is the Lillian and Henry M. Stratton Professor of Cancer Medicine at Mount Sinai Medical Center as well as Dean for Cancer Innovation and Chief, Pediatric Oncology at the Icahn School of Medicine.

== Biography ==
Before joining Mount Sinai, he was recruited by New York University School of Medicine to revitalize the research and treatment mission of NYU's Cancer Institute, which during his tenure experienced a 31 percent growth and a 50 percent increase in funding from the National Cancer Institute. He completed a residency in medicine at New York Hospital-Cornell Medical Center and pursued fellowships in immunology at both Rockefeller University and Harvard Medical School.

He has received 84 grants as of 2020 in fields related to core administration, cancer, T-Cell activation and regulation, as well as various immunological studies.

His brother, Robert Burakoff, is a gastroenterologist at Brigham and Women's Hospital in Boston, MA.

== Awards ==
- 1995 Harvard Medical School Excellence in Mentoring Award
- 2006 Lynne Cohen Foundation Award
- 2009 American Association of Immunologists Lifetime Achievement Award
- 2019 Elected a Distinguished Fellow of American Association of Immunologists

== Appointments and positions ==
- Director of The Tisch Cancer Institute at Mount Sinai
- Past Director, Skirball Institute of Biomolecular Medicine, New York University School of Medicine
- Board of Directors, Pharmacopeia Drug Discovery, Inc.
- Board of Directors, Damon Runyon Cancer Research Foundation

== Publications ==
Burakoff has published 404 articles as of 2020 and has been cited more than 23,000 times according to RearchGate.

=== Books ===
- Strom TB, Austen KF, Burakoff SJ. Therapeutic Immunology. Wiley-Blackwell, 2001 ISBN 0-632-04359-8
- Ferrara JLM, Deeg HJ, Burakoff SJ. Graft-Vs.-Host Disease: Immunology, Pathophysiology, and Treatment. Marcel Dekker, 1990 ISBN 0-8247-9728-0

=== Other publications (partial list) ===
- Pyarajan, S; Matejovic, G; Pratt, JC; Baksh, S; Burakoff, SJ (August 2008). "Interleukin-3 (IL-3)-induced c-fos activation is modulated by Gab2-calcineurin interaction". J. Biol. Chem. 283 (35): 23505–9. doi:10.1074/jbc.C800087200. PMC 3259758. PMID 18586679.
- Jin, YJ; Cai, CY; Zhang, X; Burakoff, SJ (June 2008). "Lysine 144, a ubiquitin attachment site in HIV-1 Nef, is required for Nef-mediated CD4 down-regulation". J. Immunol. 180 (12): 7878–86. doi:10.4049/jimmunol.180.12.7878. PMID 18523251.
- Sawasdikosol, S; Pyarajan, S; Alzabin, S; Matejovic, G; Burakoff, SJ (November 2007). "Prostaglandin E2 activates HPK1 kinase activity via a PKA-dependent pathway". J. Biol. Chem. 282 (48): 34693–9. doi:10.1074/jbc.M707425200. PMID 17895239.
- Mathew, JP; Taylor, BS; Bader, GD; et al. (February 2007). "From bytes to bedside: data integration and computational biology for translational cancer research". PLOS Comput. Biol. 3 (2): e12. Bibcode:2007PLSCB...3...12M. doi:10.1371/journal.pcbi.0030012. PMC 1808026. PMID 17319736.
- Fragoso, RC; Pyarajan, S; Irie, HY; Burakoff, SJ (November 2006). "A CD8/Lck transgene is able to drive thymocyte differentiation". J. Immunol. 177 (9): 6007–17. doi:10.4049/jimmunol.177.9.6007. PMID 17056525.
- Jin, YJ; Cai, CY; Zhang, X; Zhang, HT; Hirst, JA; Burakoff, SJ (September 2005). "HIV Nef-mediated CD4 down-regulation is adaptor protein complex 2 dependent". J. Immunol. 175 (5): 3157–64. doi:10.4049/jimmunol.175.5.3157. PMID 16116206.
- Jin, YJ; Zhang, X; Boursiquot, JG; Burakoff, SJ (November 2004). "CD4 phosphorylation partially reverses Nef down-regulation of CD4". J. Immunol. 173 (9): 5495–500. doi:10.4049/jimmunol.173.9.5495. PMID 15494497.
- Frazer-Abel, AA; Baksh, S; Fosmire, SP; et al. (November 2004). "Nicotine activates nuclear factor of activated T cells c2 (NFATc2) and prevents cell cycle entry in T cells". J. Pharmacol. Exp. Ther. 311 (2): 758–69. doi:10.1124/jpet.104.070060. PMID 15231866.
- Friedman, JS; Lopez, MF; Fleming, MD; et al. (October 2004). "SOD2-deficiency anemia: protein oxidation and altered protein expression reveal targets of damage, stress response, and antioxidant responsiveness". Blood. 104 (8): 2565–73. doi:10.1182/blood-2003-11-3858. PMID 15205258.
- Su, MW; Pyarajan, S; Chang, JH; et al. (September 2004). "Fratricide of CD8+ cytotoxic T lymphocytes is dependent on cellular activation and perforin-mediated killing". Eur. J. Immunol. 34 (9): 2459–70. doi:10.1002/eji.200425096. PMID 15307178.
- Friedman, JS; Alpdogan, O; van den Brink, MR; et al. (July 2004). "Increasing T-cell age reduces effector activity but preserves proliferative capacity in a murine allogeneic major histocompatibility complex-mismatched bone marrow transplant model". Biol. Blood Marrow Transplant. 10 (7): 448–60. doi:10.1016/j.bbmt.2004.03.005. PMID 15205666.
- Slavik, JM; Lim, DG; Burakoff, SJ; Hafler, DA (January 2004). "Rapamycin-resistant proliferation of CD8+ T cells correlates with p27kip1 down-regulation and bcl-xL induction, and is prevented by an inhibitor of phosphoinositide 3-kinase activity". J. Biol. Chem. 279 (2): 910–9. doi:10.1074/jbc.M209733200. PMID 14573608.
