= Russell Diethrick Park =

Stadium in Jamestown, New York, US

Russell E. Diethrick, Jr. Park
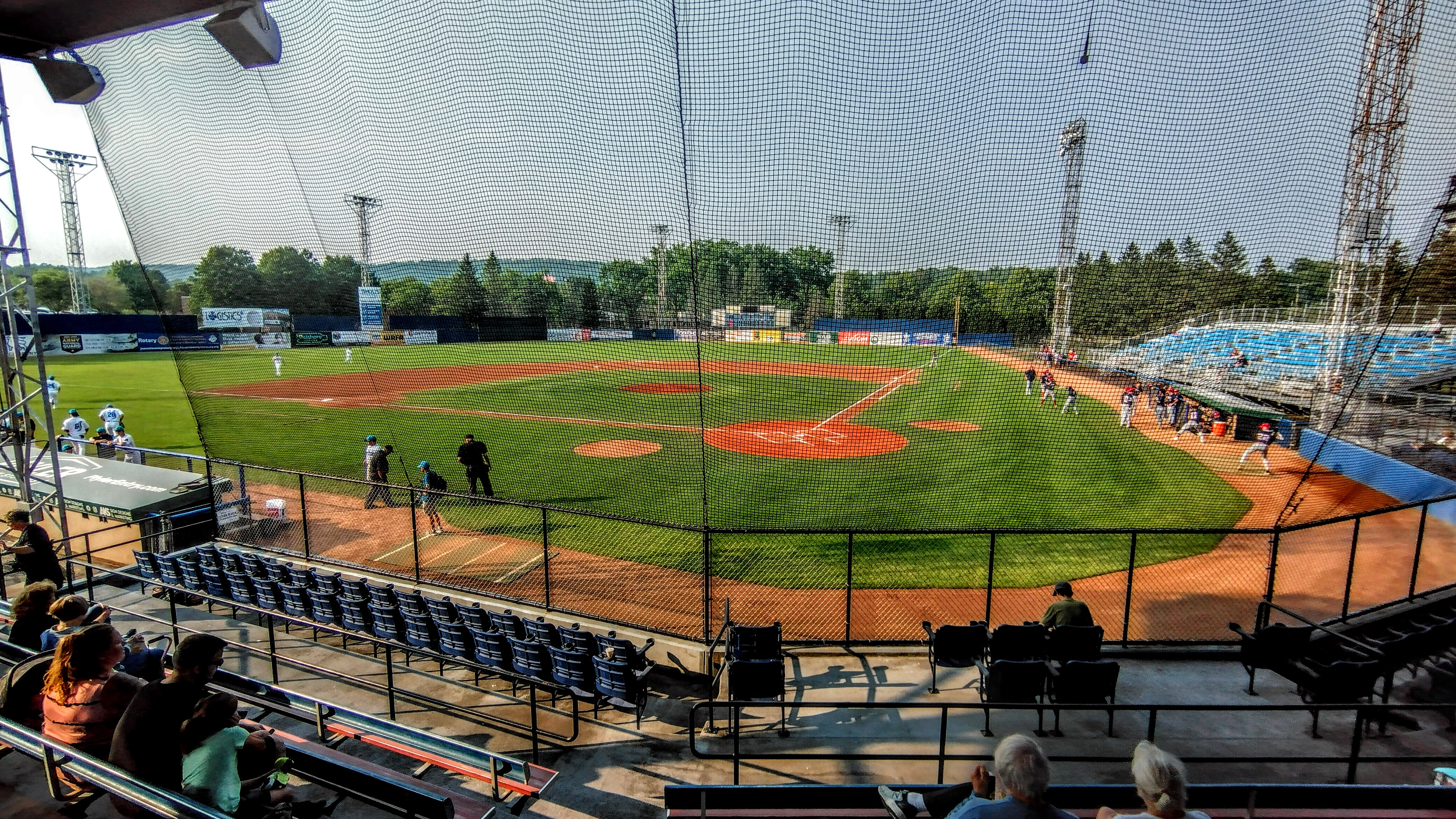
- Interactive map of Russell E. Diethrick, Jr. Park
- Former names: Jamestown Municipal Stadium
- Location: 485 Falconer Street; Jamestown, New York 14702
- Coordinates: 42.112737°N 79.219274°W
- Owner: City of Jamestown
- Capacity: 3,000
- Surface: Grass
- Field size: Left Field: 335 feet (102 m); Center Field: 410 feet (125 m); Right Field: 342 feet (104 m)

Construction
- Groundbreaking: October 1940
- Opened: May 6, 1941
- Cost: US$60,000 ($1.31 million in 2025 dollars)

Tenants
- Jamestown Tarp Skunks (PGCBL) (2020–present); Jamestown Jammers (NYPL) (1994–2014); Jamestown Expos (NYPL) (1941–1993); Jamestown Community College (1961–present); Jamestown High School

Russell E. Diethrick Jr. Park is a stadium in Jamestown, New York. It opened in 1941 and holds 3,000 people. Primarily used for baseball, Diethrick Park was home to teams in the New York–Penn League, a short season minor league baseball league, from its opening until 2014. It is also home to the Jamestown Community College baseball team as well as Jamestown High School's baseball team. It also has hosted multiple Babe Ruth League World Series, most recently the 2023 13 Year-Old World Series .

== History ==
Built in 1941, Jamestown Municipal Stadium was, at time of the NY-Penn League's departure, the second oldest ballpark in the league; the park replaced a park in Celoron that the NYPL had used in its first two seasons. The stadium is owned by the City of Jamestown. It hosted the Jamestown Falcons of the "Pennsylvania–Ontario–New York League" (PONY League), which was later known as the NY-Penn League. The park was later unofficially known as "College Stadium" after Jamestown Community College relocated its campus right behind the park on Falconer Street in 1961.

On August 9, 1997, the park was renamed Russell E. Diethrick Jr. Park in honor of Jamestown's "Mr. Baseball." It was dedicated to Mr. Diethrick, who has been player, manager, owner, supporter and friend of professional and youth baseball in Jamestown longer than most can remember. Mr. Diethrick is currently the Community Development Officer for Jamestown Savings Bank. He has been an important member of the voluntary Jamestown Jammers Executive Advisory Board. Mr. Diethrick also serves as the Host President of the Jamestown Babe Ruth World Series Committee and a member of the National Board of Directors for Babe Ruth, Inc.

The stadium has undergone numerous renovations in order to modernize. In 2006, a brand new scoreboard and sound system were installed and in 2010 the current press box was renovated.

The Jamestown Jammers took up residence in the city in 1994, immediately after the Montreal Expos moved the city's original NYPL team to Vermont. After 21 consecutive seasons, the NYPL moved the Jammers to Morgantown, West Virginia, at the end of the 2014 season, leaving the city without professional baseball.

The amateur Prospect League, a collegiate summer baseball league, took up residence in the ballpark in 2015; that team was also known as the Jamestown Jammers. The Jammers were replaced by a team in the Perfect Game Collegiate Baseball League the next year, which played another three seasons before the team's owners abruptly shut the team down and left town in October 2018. A replacement team in the PGCBL, originally intended to keep the Jammers name and history, abruptly decided to rename the team the Jamestown Tarp Skunks (after an inside joke in the Jammers organization) prior to the start of the 2020 season.

In 1990, College Stadium was the site of a memorable large-scale stunt by the TV series Candid Camera, in which a catcher for the then-tenant Jamestown Expos was put up to calling pitches with nothing but incomprehensible signs.

Diethrick Park is almost exclusively used for baseball; other venues in Jamestown are better suited for other sports (Strider Field hosts football, and Northwest Arena handles concerts, ice hockey and other indoor events).
