= Keegan Tingey =

American soccer player (born 2000)

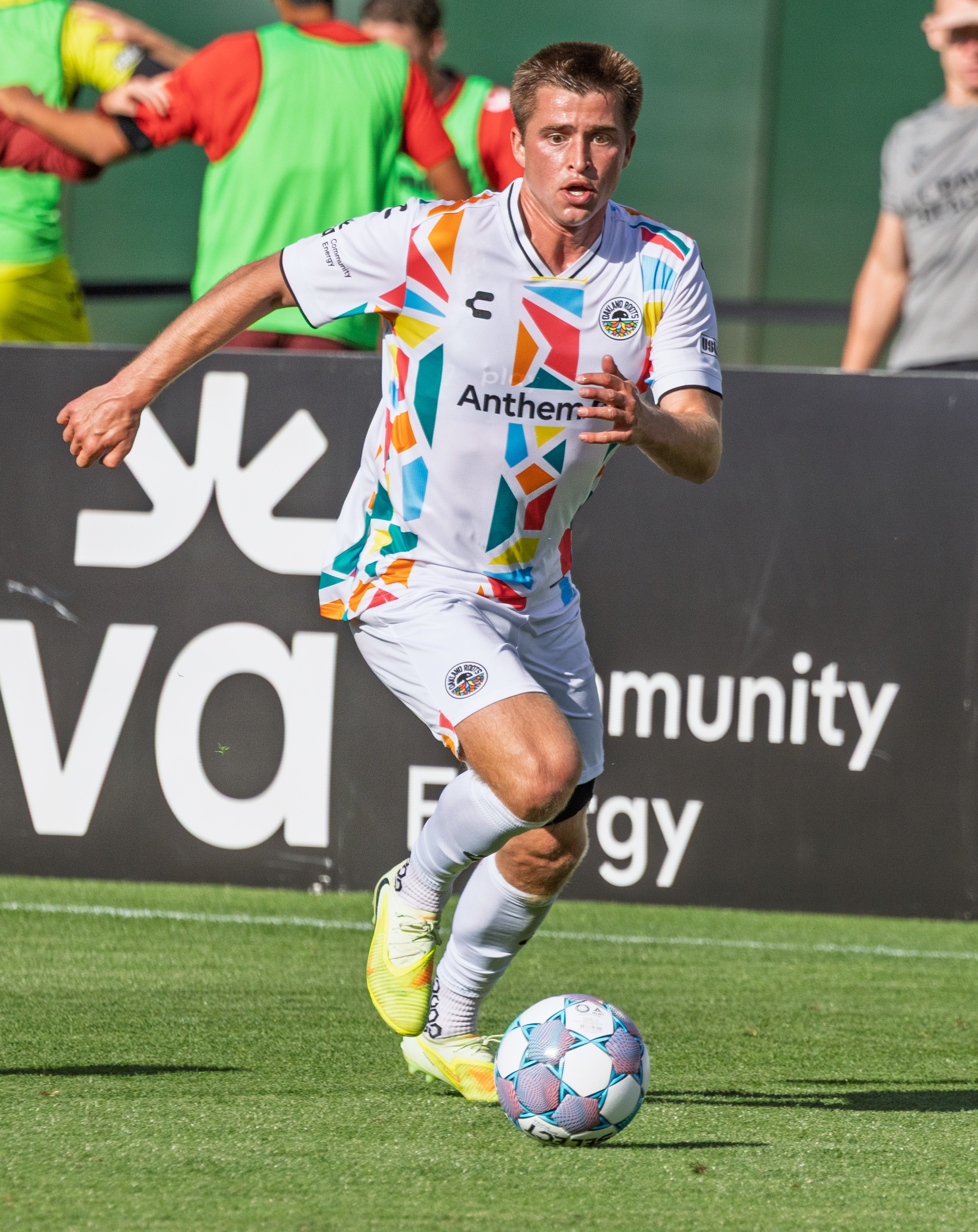
- Tingey with the Oakland Roots in 2026

Personal information
- Full name: Keegan Kelly Tingey
- Date of birth: August 17, 2000 (age 26)
- Place of birth: Fresno, California, United States
- Height: 5 ft 10 in (1.78 m)
- Position: Left-back

Team information
- Current team: Oakland Roots
- Number: 17

Youth career
- 2015–2016: Ballistic United
- 2016–2019: San Jose Earthquakes

College career
| Years | Team | Apps | (Gls) |
| 2019–2022 | Stanford Cardinal | 66 | (3) |

Senior career*
| Years | Team | Apps | (Gls) |
| 2023 | San Jose Earthquakes | 0 | (0) |
| 2023 | San Jose Earthquakes II | 27 | (2) |
| 2024–2025 | Loudoun United | 60 | (3) |
| 2026– | Oakland Roots | 18 | (0) |
- * Club domestic league appearances and goals as of October 31, 2026

Keegan Kelly Tingey (born August 17, 2000) is an American soccer player who currently plays for Oakland Roots in the USL Championship.

== Playing career ==
=== Youth and college ===
Tingey was born in Fresno, California and was raised in Danville where he attended De La Salle High School. Tingey joined the Ballistic United youth team in 2015, before becoming a member of the San Jose Earthquakes academy a year later, where he played for three seasons and trained with the first team in 2017 and 2018.

In 2019, Tingey attended Stanford University to play college soccer. Over four seasons with the Cardinal, Tingey made 66 appearances, scoring three goals and tallying 16 assists. His college accolades include been a Pac-12 champion in 2020, three-time All-Pac-12, CSC Academic All-America Third Team, three-time CoSIDA Academic All-District First Team, and a two-Time Pac-12 Academic Honor Roll inclusion.

=== Professional ===
On January 6, 2023, Tingey was announced a homegrown player signing for San Jose Earthquakes ahead of their 2023 season. He didn't appear for San Jose's MLS side during his single season with the club, but appeared 27 times for San Jose Earthquakes II during their inaugural season in the MLS Next Pro. He was released by San Jose at the end of 2023.

On January 10, 2024, Tingey signed a one-year deal with USL Championship side Loudoun United. Tingey was released by Loudoun following their 2025 season. He subsequently signed with USL Championship side Oakland Roots.
