= Wesley Leggett =

American soccer player (born 2001)

Personal information
- Date of birth: March 16, 2001 (age 25)
- Place of birth: Trenton, New Jersey, United States
- Height: 1.78 m (5 ft 10 in)
- Position: Forward

Team information
- Current team: Monterey Bay FC
- Number: 11

Youth career
- 2015–2019: Match Fit Academy

College career
| Years | Team | Apps | (Gls) |
| 2019 | UConn Huskies | 6 | (0) |
| 2020–2022 | St. John's Red Storm | 44 | (10) |

Senior career*
| Years | Team | Apps | (Gls) |
| 2021–2022 | Real Central New Jersey | 14 | (7) |
| 2023–2025 | Loudoun United | 79 | (13) |
| 2025 | Charleston Battery | 4 | (0) |
| 2026– | Monterey Bay FC | 28 | (3) |
- * Club domestic league appearances and goals as of 18:48, 9 November 2026 (UTC)

Wesley Leggett (born March 16, 2001) is an American professional soccer player who plays as a forward for the USL Championship club Monterey Bay FC.

== Career ==
=== Youth ===
Leggett is from Lawrence Township, New Jersey. He attended Princeton Day School where he was a three-year starter serving as captain his senior year. He tallied 22 goals and five assists as a senior after posting 20 goals and four assists as a junior. During his sophomore year Leggett tallied 7 goals and helped lead the PDS Panthers to a Prep B Championship and Prep B Finalist his senior year. He was named Prep Player of the Year, First Team All-Prep and First Team All-Area.

Leggett played club soccer for Match Fit Academy. He led his team to the U-17 NJYS State Cup Championship and USYS Regional Finalist. During his junior year, Match Fit Academy joined the inaugural year of the Boys Elite Clubs National League (ECNL). As an ECNL standout, Leggett was named a 2x All American, Northeast Conference Player of the year, All Conference Team, and invited to the National Training Camp in the Bahamas, where he scored a goal against the Bahamas national team.

=== College ===
In 2019, Leggett attended the University of Connecticut to play college soccer. In his freshman season, he made six appearances for the Huskies. Following the cancelled 2020 season due the COVID-19 pandemic, Leggett transferred to St. John's University in the spring of 2020. He went on to make 44 appearances for the Red Storm, scoring ten goals and adding six assists.

While at college, Leggett also played in the USL League Two with Real Central New Jersey. Over two seasons, Leggett scored seven goals in 14 regular season appearances.

=== Professional ===
In December 2022 Leggett entered the 2023 MLS SuperDraft as one of the 367 eligible players. On January 10, 2023, Leggett signed with USL Championship club Loudoun United. He made his professional debut March 11, appearing as an 84th-minute substitute during a 3–1 away victory over Memphis 901. On September 11, 2025, Leggett was transferred to USL Championship side Charleston Battery. On December 23, 2025, Leggett was transferred to USL Championship side Monterey Bay FC.
