= Pamela J. Fink =

American academic

- Born: Dodge City, Kansas
- Education: Massachusetts Institute of Technology, Indiana University
- Known for: Immunology, T cells
- Partner: Michael J. Bevan
- Scientific career
- Institutions: University of Washington School of Medicine, Scripps Clinic and Research Foundation, University of California, San Diego, Stanford University School of Medicine

External videos
- “Pamela J. Fink, Ph.D. (AAI ‘73, Editor-in-Chief, The Journal of Immunology, 2013–2018)”

Pamela J. Fink is a professor emerita in the Department of Immunology at the University of Washington School of Medicine. Fink was the first woman to be editor-in-chief of the Journal of Immunology, serving from 2013–2018.

As of 2019 Fink became a Distinguished Fellow of the American Association of Immunologists and received the AAI Lifetime Achievement Award "In recognition of a remarkable career of scientific achievement and contributions to AAI and the field of immunology".

== Early life and education ==
Pamela Fink was born in Dodge City, Kansas and grew up in Kansas City where she attended public schools and studied ballet. Eventually giving up ballet for science, Fink graduated from Indiana University with a B.S. While at Indiana University she worked with John Richardson in the Department of Chemistry, studying genetics and operon control in bacteriophage λ.

Fink then attended Massachusetts Institute of Technology, receiving her Ph.D. in Biology in 1981. She did her Ph.D. work with Michael J. Bevan, working on T cells and their recognition of antigens.

== Career ==
Fink held postdoctoral positions at Stanford University School of Medicine with Irving Weissman and the University of California, San Diego with Stephen Hedrick. She next worked with Per Peterson at Scripps Clinic and Research Foundation for two years. In 1985 she and Michael J. Bevan were married. In 1990, Fink joined the University of Washington, where she remained until her retirement from the department of immunology in January 2019.

== Research ==
After beginning her scientific work in developmental biology, Fink developed an interest in immunology as a developmental system. She was particularly attracted to how T cells learn how to recognize foreign antigens and protect the body during their development in the thymus. By transplanting the thymus from one animal to another, Fink was able to test the effects of mixing the genetics and environment of T cells and to demonstrate that T cells in the thymus learn environmentally rather than genetically. Fink went on to examine T cell structure and function using tools from molecular biology.

After setting up her own lab at the University of Washington, much of Fisk's work focused on the maturation of peripheral T cells. She determined that T cells that have recently left the thymus (recent thymic immigrants) respond differently than mature T cells. The concentration of such cells differ over the lifespan, with only immature T cells in the very young and ongoing creation of new T cells, with a higher proportion of mature T cells in later life. This has significant implications for immunology and medical treatment.

== Awards and honors ==
- 1989, Scholar, Leukemia Society of America
- 1994, NSF Career Advancement Award, National Science Foundation, for Biochemical Analysis of the Defective Signaling Pathway in Anergic CD8+ Murine T Cells
- 2019, Lifetime Achievement Award, American Association of Immunologists
- 2019, Distinguished Fellow, American Association of Immunologists
