= French Meadow Bakery =

Privately held companies based in Minnesota

Coordinates: 44°57′18″N 93°17′18″W

- Company type: Private
- Industry: Bakery
- Founded: 1985
- Headquarters: Minneapolis, Minnesota, United States
- Key people: Lynn Gordon, founder
- Products: See products section
- Website: www.frenchmeadow.com

French Meadow Bakery is a privately held bakery located in the Uptown neighborhood of Minneapolis that produces gluten-free, vegan, yeast-free and kosher parve foods. It is one of the longest running certified organic bakeries in the country. The bakery is currently certified organic by the USDA and Quality Assurance International, certified gluten-free by the Gluten-Free Certification Organization, and certified Low Glycemic for Diabetics by the Glycemic Research Institute.

== History ==
French Meadow started when Lynn Gordon was teaching a cooking class and pondering a new recipe for bread that would accommodate her macrobiotic diet. The diet prohibited her from eating breads loaded with yeast and sugar. Thus, the idea for French Meadow Bakery was born. The bakery was opened in 1985 and since then has offered products that only use natural ingredients and no artificial colors, flavors or preservatives. The bakery was acquired by Rich Products Corporation in July 2006.

== French Meadow Bakery and Cafe ==
French Meadow Bakery and Cafe is a small local cafe in Minneapolis which serves breakfast, lunch and dinner. It features many healthy options that utilizes the baked goods that the bakery makes as well as fresh, local, organic ingredients. French Meadow Bakery and Cafe also features airport concession stands at Salt Lake City International Airport, JFK International, University of Minnesota-Twin Cities, University of Massachusetts in Amherst, airport in Atlanta, Logan International and Minneapolis-Saint Paul International Airports which offers such products as peanut butter cookies, carrot cake, hemp bagels and a variety of freshly baked breads. These products are made with organic, all-natural ingredients and packed with ingredients such as hemp seeds, whole grains, fruits, vegetables, and/or flax seeds. Winner of the 6th Annual PETA Proggy Awards in December 2008 for Best New Airport Concessions. These awards are presented in recognition of extraordinary efforts to help bring about an end to animal suffering.
