= Attain Sports and Entertainment =

Sports ownership and management company

- Industry: Sports management
- Founded: 2021; 5 years ago
- Founder: Greg Baroni
- Key people: Greg Baroni
- Parent: Attain LLC
- Website: https://attainsports.com/

Attain Sports and Entertainment is an American sports ownership and management company, which began in 2021 and owns various sports teams, primarily consisting of Minor League Baseball teams.

== History ==
Greg Baroni is the chief executive officer and founder of Attain Sports and Entertainment. He previously founded Attain LLC in 2009 and then organized Attain Sports (along with Attain Partners and Attain Capital) in 2021.

In January 2022, Maryland Baseball, LLC, a subsidiary of Attain, purchased the Chesapeake Baysox of the Double-A baseball Eastern League and the Frederick Keys, which were a Collegiate summer baseball team at the time in the MLB Draft League. Maryland Baseball LLC was formed in 2021 to manage the two teams.

In February 2023, Attain purchased a controlling interest in Loudoun United FC, a USL Championship team, from the D.C. United Ownership Group.

In 2023, Attain formed a new Atlantic League of Professional Baseball team called the Spire City Ghost Hounds. Following the 2023 season the team took a hiatus for the 2024 season, which was extended for the 2025 season. They are forecasting to come back for the 2026 season.

In October 2024, Attain bought a controlling interest in the Aberdeen IronBirds through its parent company, IB Professional Holdings. Attain partnered with Cal Ripken Jr. and Billy Ripken for the acquisition of the team.

In August 2025, Attain announced a reorganization of its minor league baseball teams. Attain's High-A baseball affiliate of the Baltimore Orioles will relocate to Frederick, Maryland and the MLB Draft League team would relocate to Aberdeen, Maryland. The teams would keep their names, however.

== Sports properties ==
Team	Sport	League	Year acquired
Aberdeen IronBirds	Baseball	MLB Draft League	2024
Chesapeake Baysox	Baseball	Eastern League (Double-A)	2022
Frederick Keys	Baseball	South Atlantic League (High-A)	2022
Loudoun United FC	Soccer	USL Championship	2023
Spire City Ghost Hounds	Baseball	Atlantic League of Professional Baseball	
