= West Virginia Black Bears =

- Founded in 1989 in Niagara Falls, New York; Based in Granville, West Virginia since 2015
Team logo
Cap insignia

Minor league affiliations
- Class: Collegiate summer (2021–present)
- Previous classes: Class A Short Season (2015–2020)
- League: MLB Draft League (2021–present)
- Previous leagues: New York–Penn League (2015–2020)

Major league affiliations
- Team: Unaffiliated (2021–present)
- Previous teams: Pittsburgh Pirates (2015–2020)

Minor league titles
- League titles (4): 2015; 2022; 2023; 2025
- First-half titles (1): 2022
- Second-half titles (2): 2023; 2025

Team data
- Colors: Black, blue, gold, white
- Ballpark: Kendrick Family Ballpark (2015–present)
- Owner/ Operator: Bob Rich, Jr. (Rich Baseball Operations)
- General manager: Leighann Sainato
- Manager: Jon Nunnally
- Website: mlbdraftleague.com/west-virginia

The West Virginia Black Bears are a collegiate summer baseball team of the MLB Draft League. They are located in Granville, West Virginia, and play their home games at Kendrick Family Ballpark, which is across the Monongahela River from Morgantown and West Virginia University. From 2015 to 2020, they were a Minor League Baseball team of the New York–Penn League. They were the Low-A affiliate of the Pittsburgh Pirates from their inception until MLB's reorganization of the minors after the 2020 season.

In August 2014, it was announced that the Jamestown Jammers would cease operations and move to Morgantown. On October 22, the team announced that they would be named the "Black Bears" following a fan vote, as the American black bear is the state animal of West Virginia. Other finalists included Black Diamonds, Canaries, Coal Kings, Coal Sox, Energy, Moonshiners, Muskets, Wild Ones, and Wonder.

In January 2015, Wyatt Toregas was named as their inaugural manager. The Black Bears won the New York–Penn League wild card in their inaugural season. The team then defeated the Williamsport Crosscutters and the Staten Island Yankees to win the 2015 New York–Penn League Championship. On February 24, 2022, Leighann Sainato was named general manager.

== Roster ==
West Virginia Black Bears roster
Players	Coaches/Other
Pitchers: 22 Jason Bollman; 36 Wes Burton; 18 Trey Cooper; 16 Austin Eaton; 54 Michael Foltz Jr.; 29 Ricky Harrison; 51 Spencer Hill; 34 Cameron LeJeune; 3 Jake Lynch; 38 Justin Needles; 23 Will Rogers; 99 Joe Steebers; 43 Solomon Washington; 10 Jacob Weaver; Catchers: 8 Jake Berg; 26 Evan Blum; Infielders: 32 J.T. Carter; 31 David Coppedge; 9 Landon Frei; 28 Judah Morris; 27 Jordan Peyton; Outfielders: 13 Drew Collins; 4 Kyle Ratliff; 37 Jace Rinehart; 11 Alex Rodgers; 2 Alex Ungar	Manager: 25 Jon Nunnally; Coaches: 24 Antonio Caballero (hitting); 45 Jay Jackson (pitching); 7-day injured list; ~ Development list; # Rehab assignment; ∞ Reserve list; ‡ Restricted list; § Suspended list; † Temporarily inactive list; Roster updated September 01, 2025; Transactions; → More rosters: MiLB • MLB Draft League

== Season-by-season record ==
West Virginia Black Bears (New York–Penn League)
Year	Regular season			Postseason			
Year	Record	Win %	Finish	Record	Win %	Result	MLB
2015	42–34	.553	2nd Pinckney Division	4–1	.800	Won Semifinals vs. Williamsport Crosscutters, 2–1; Won Championship vs. Staten Island Yankees, 2–0	Pirates
2016	38–38	.500	3rd Pinckney Division	—	—	Did not qualify for playoffs	Pirates
2017	40–35	.533	3rd Pinckney Division	—	—	Did not qualify for playoffs	Pirates
2018	32–44	.421	5th Pinckney Division	—	—	Did not qualify for playoffs	Pirates
2019	40–36	.526	2nd Pinckney Division	—	—	Did not qualify for playoffs	Pirates
2020	–	–	None	—	—	Season cancelled due to COVID-19 pandemic	Pirates
Totals	192–182	.513	—	4–1	.800		
West Virginia Black Bears (MLB Draft League)
2021	30–19	.612	2nd	—	—	–	N/A
2022	48–30	.615	1st	1–0	1.000	Won Championship vs. Williamsport Crosscutters, 1–0	N/A
2023	46–27	.630	1st	1–0	1.000	Won Championship vs. Trenton Thunder, 1–0	N/A
2024	35–39	.473	6th	—	—	—	N/A
2025	45–28	.616	1st	1-0	1.000	Won Championship vs. State College Spikes, 1-0	N/A
Totals	204–143	.588	—	3–0	1.000		
