= Drew Skundrich =

American soccer player (born 1995)

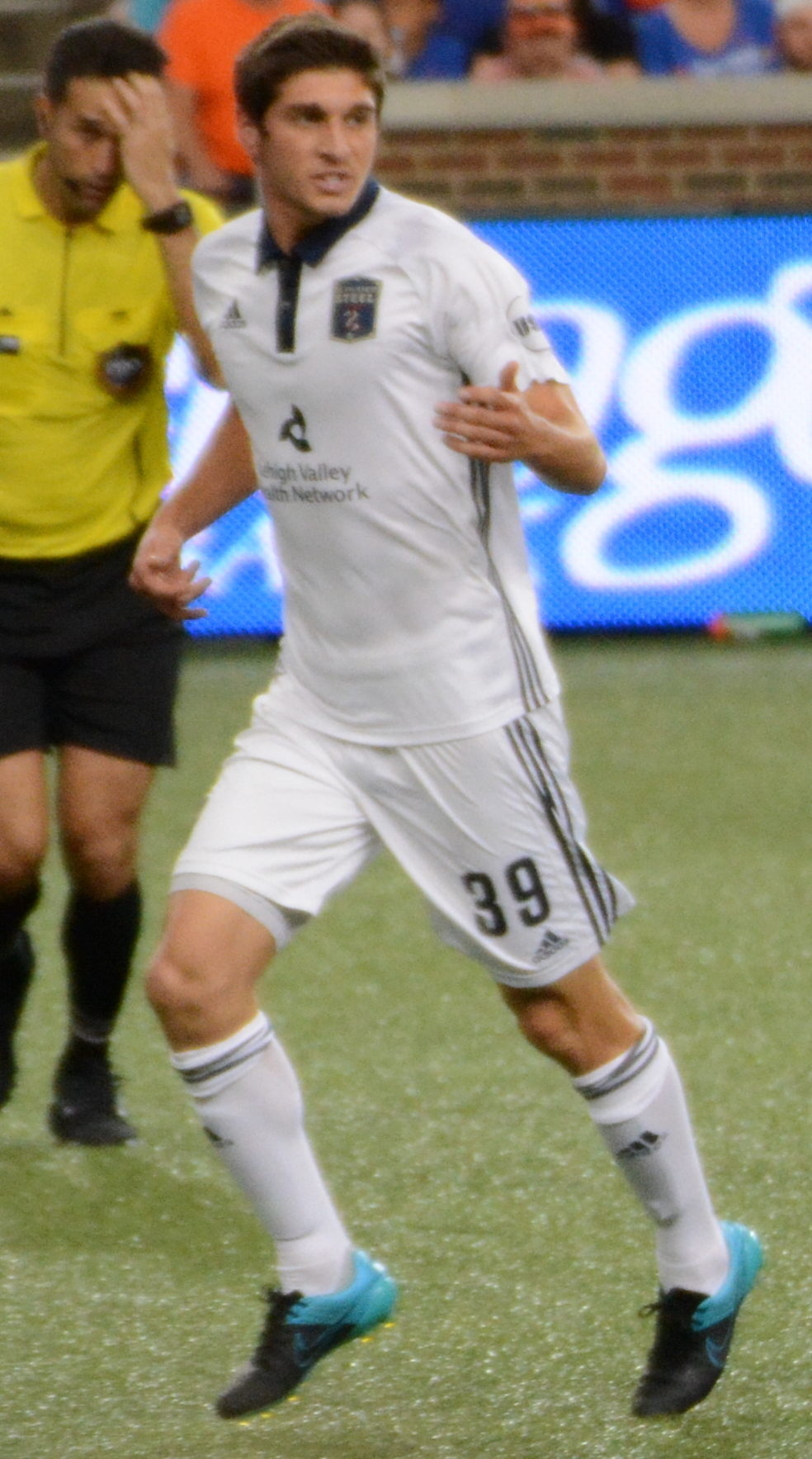
- Skundrich with Bethlehem Steel in 2018

Personal information
- Full name: Andrew Skundrich
- Date of birth: September 17, 1995 (age 31)
- Place of birth: Lancaster, Pennsylvania, United States
- Height: 5 ft 11 in (1.80 m)
- Position: Midfielder

Youth career
- 2010–2014: PA Classics

College career
Years	Team	Apps	(Gls)
2014–2017	Stanford Cardinal	82	(9)

Senior career*
Years	Team	Apps	(Gls)
2016	Burlingame Dragons	8	(0)
2018	Bethlehem Steel	26	(2)
2019–2020	Sacramento Republic	42	(3)
2021	Loudoun United	0	(0)
2021–2022	D.C. United	39	(0)
2023	Colorado Springs Switchbacks	55	(4)
2024–2025	Loudoun United	52	(2)
Total		222	(11)
- * Club domestic league appearances and goals as of October 25, 2025

Drew Skundrich (born September 17, 1995) is an American former professional soccer player.

== Career ==
=== Youth and college ===
Skundrich grew up in Pennsylvania, where he attended Hempfield High School. He played four years of college soccer at Stanford University between 2014 and 2017, where he made 82 appearances, scoring 9 goals and tallying 13 assists. He was captain his junior and senior year. During his senior season, Skundrich earned First Team All-Pac-12 honors as the team won its third-straight Pac-12 Championship. He was also a member of the league's second-team honors in 2016, while collecting conference All-Academic second team honors in 2015.

Skundrich also played with Premier Development League side Burlingame Dragons in 2016.

=== Professional ===
On January 17, 2018, Skundrich was selected 40th overall in the 2018 MLS SuperDraft by LA Galaxy. However, he wasn't signed by the club.

On March 14, 2018, Skundrich signed with United Soccer League side Bethlehem Steel. On December 10, 2018, Skundrich signed with United Soccer League side Sacramento Republic.

On February 8, 2021, Skundrich moved to Loudoun United for the 2021 season. On May 12, 2021, Skundrich moved to Loudoun's MLS parent club D.C. United. The next day he made his MLS debut in a 1–0 win against the Chicago Fire. Following the 2022 season, his contract option was declined by D.C. United.

On December 5, 2022, it was announced Skundrich would join USL Championship side Colorado Springs Switchbacks for their 2023 season.

On November 26, 2025, Skundwich retired from playing professional soccer and joined the Loudoun United FC technical team as their health & performance coach.

== Career statistics ==
Clubs	Season	League			Cup		Continental		Other		Total	
Clubs	Season	Division	Apps	Goals	Apps	Goals	Apps	Goals	Apps	Goals	Apps	Goals
Burlingame Dragons	2016	USL League Two	8	0	—	—	—	—	2	0	10	0
Bethlehem Steel	2018	USL Championship	26	2	—	—	—	—	2	0	28	2
Sacramento Republic	2019	USL Championship	32	1	3	1	—	—	3	0	38	2
Sacramento Republic	2020	USL Championship	14	2	—	—	—	—	1	0	15	2
Sacramento Republic	Totals		46	3	3	1	0	0	1	0	53	4
Loudoun United	2021	USL Championship	0	0	—	—	—	—	—	—	0	0
D.C. United	2021	MLS	20	0	—	—	—	—	—	—	20	0
D.C. United	2022	MLS	19	0	2	0	—	—	—	—	21	0
D.C. United	Totals		39	0	2	0	0	0	0	0	41	0
Colorado Springs Switchbacks	2023	USL Championship	23	2	1	1	—	—	—	—	24	3
Career totals			142	7	5	2	0	0	8	0	156	9

== Personal life ==
In December 2019, Skundrich married Andi Sullivan. On Feb. 14, 2025, they announced that they were expecting a baby girl.
