= Robert R. Rich =

American immunologist (born 1941)

Robert Regier Rich (born 7 March 1941) is professor of medicine, microbiology and medical education, and dean emeritus at the University of Alabama School of Medicine. He served as the editor-in-chief of the Journal of Immunology from 2003 to 2008, and was elected a Fellow of AAI in 2019.

== Academic career ==
Rich received an AB from Oberlin College in 1962 and an MD from the University of Kansas in 1966. He was an immunology intern and resident in internal medicine at the University of Washington – Seattle from 1966 to 1968. From 1968 to 1971, Rich served as clinical associate, chief clinical associate, and senior staff fellow at the National Institutes of Health in Bethesda, Maryland. He was a research associate at Harvard Medical School from 1971 to 1973. At Baylor College of Medicine, Rich was appointed associate professor of microbiology, immunology, and internal medicine (1973–1978), professor (1978–1995), and head of the immunology section (1978–1998). He was executive associate dean and professor of medicine, microbiology, and immunology at the Emory University School of Medicine from 1998 to 2004. In 2004, Rich became senior vice president for medicine and dean of the school of medicine at the University of Alabama – Birmingham.

=== Research ===
At Baylor, Rich's research involved T-lymphocytes and regulation of the immune response. He also headed a search committee for the Howard Hughes Medical Institute to establish a program at Baylor in structural biology.

=== Awards and honors ===
- Distinguished Service Award, American Association of Immunologists, 1999
- Lifetime Achievement Award, American Association of Immunologists, 2008
- Distinguished Scientist Award, American Association of Allergy Asthma & Immunology, 2012
- Distinguished Fellow, American Association of Immunologists, 2019

He was a Howard Hughes Medical Institute Investigator from 1977 to 1991.

== Personal life ==
He is married to Susan Jepsen Solliday and has three children.
