= Jacob Erlandson =

American soccer player (born 1999)

Personal information
- Full name: Jacob Erlandson
- Date of birth: March 14, 1999 (age 27)
- Place of birth: Akron, Ohio, United States
- Height: 6 ft 1 in (1.85 m)
- Position: Defender

Team information
- Current team: Loudoun United
- Number: 24

Youth career
- –2017: Ohio Galaxies

College career
| Years | Team | Apps | (Gls) |
| 2017–2019 | Huntington Foresters | | (21) |
| 2020–2021 | Bowling Green Falcons | 32 | (9) |

Senior career*
| Years | Team | Apps | (Gls) |
| 2019 | Dayton Dutch Lions | 10 | (0) |
| 2021 | Flint City Bucks | 14 | (5) |
| 2022–2023 | Columbus Crew 2 | 25 | (0) |
| 2024– | Loudoun United | 59 | (1) |
- * Club domestic league appearances and goals as of October 31, 2026

Jacob Erlandson (born March 14, 1999) is an American professional soccer player who plays as a defender for Loudoun United in the USL Championship.

== Personal life ==
Jacob Erlandson's younger brother, Joshua is also professional soccer player who currently plays for the Richmond Kickers in USL League One.

== Early years ==
=== Youth ===
Born in Akron, Ohio, Erlandson grew up in Dayton, Ohio, attending Dayton Christian High School. Erlandson also played club soccer at Ohio Galaxies until 2017. He was a four-year letterwinner at Dayton Christian, a two-time All-Ohio First-Team selection who was also named an All-American as a senior, and scored a career total of 97 goals and tallied 56 assists in his four-year career. He was named the Metro Buckeye League Player of the Year in both seasons, and also was named the Miami Valley Area Player of the Year in each of those two years.

=== College and amateur ===
In 2017, Erlandson attended Huntington University to play college soccer. In three seasons with the Foresters, Erlandson scored 21 goals whilst alternating as a defender and a forward. He earned honors including All-CL Second Team in 2017 and 2018, and in 2019 was a NAIA All American, the Crossroads League Defender of the Year, and all-league first team for the third consecutive time. In 2020, Erlandson transferred to Bowling Green State University, where he scored nine goals and added six assists in 32 appearances for the Falcons, gaining All-MAC First Team honors in his first season. In his final season, he was again named an All-MAC First Team, as well as being on the MAC's All-Tournament Team, the United Soccer Coaches All-North Region First-Team, OCSA All-Ohio First Team, and was also named as BGSU's Male Athlete of the Year.

While at college, Erlandson also appeared in the USL League Two with Dayton Dutch Lions in 2019, and again with Flint City Bucks during their 2021 season, where he bagged five goals for the team during the regular season.

== Club career ==
=== Columbus Crew 2 ===
On January 11, 2022, Erlandson was selected 40th overall in the 2022 MLS SuperDraft by Columbus Crew. He signed with the club's MLS Next Pro side Columbus Crew 2 on March 17, 2022. During their inaugural season, he was sidelined for a majority of the year with injury and only made three regular season appearances as the team won the MLS Next Pro Regular Season and MLS Next Pro Eastern Conference titles. During his second season with the side, he was a mainstay in the backline and led the team to a second straight Eastern Conference Title, and the MLS Next Pro Finals.

=== Loudoun United ===
On February 14, 2024, Erlandson signed with USL Championship side Loudoun United on a one-year deal. Erlandson re-signed with Loudoun on December 5, 2024, on a two-year contract with an option for a third year.

== Honors ==
=== Club ===
Columbus Crew 2

- MLS Next Pro: 2022 Regular season champions
- MLS Next Pro: 2022 Eastern Conference winners
