= Jamestown Jammers =

- 1994–2014; Jamestown, New York
Team logo
Cap insignia

Minor league affiliations
- Class: Short-Season A (1994–2014)
- League: New York–Penn League (1994–2014)

Major league affiliations
- Team: Pittsburgh Pirates (2013–2014); Florida/Miami Marlins (2002–2012); Atlanta Braves (1999–2001); Detroit Tigers (1994–1998)

Minor league titles
- Division titles (1): 1994

Team data
- Name: Jamestown Jammers (1994–2014)
- Mascot: Bubba Grape (2006–2014); J.J. Jammer (1994–2005)
- Ballpark: Russell Diethrick Park

The Jamestown Jammers were a minor league baseball team based in Jamestown, New York from 1994 until 2014. The team was the Short-Season A classification affiliate of the Pittsburgh Pirates and played in the New York–Penn League. The team played all of their home games at Russell Diethrick Park.

On August 25, 2014, a week before the end of the 2014 season, it was announced that the team would cease operations in Jamestown and be relocated to Morgantown, West Virginia, beginning in 2015. That year, the club, which is owned by Bob Rich, Jr., began play at Monongalia County Ballpark, as the West Virginia Black Bears.

The Jamestown Jammers intellectual property is separate from the franchise and survived after the minor league franchise relocated. From 2015 to 2018, the Jammers name was used for collegiate summer baseball teams.

== History ==
=== New York–Penn League ===
==== Niagara Falls Rapids ====
The team was previously based in Niagara Falls, New York as the Niagara Falls Rapids, a Detroit Tigers affiliate. Their home stadium in Niagara Falls was Sal Maglie Stadium. The team played in Niagara Falls from 1989 to 1993.

The team was preceded in Jamestown by the Jamestown Falcons (initially known as the Jamestown Jaguars) and the Jamestown Expos. The Expos had played in Jamestown up until the 1993 season, when the team moved to Vermont and became known as the Vermont Lake Monsters.

In 1994, immediately following the Expos' departure, the Rapids moved to Jamestown and assumed the name "Jamestown Jammers." The Jamestown Expos had left the city after the 1993 season, relocating to Vermont. The new team was named the "Jammers" after a fan vote, with the winning name beating out others such as the All-Americans, Furniture Makers, Jimmies, Lakers, Lucys, Muskies and Steamers. The team's logo was a Tasmanian devil-esque character. The mascot was a similar character named J.J. Jammer.

In the off-season before the 2006 season, in an attempt to put an end once and for all to the "what is a Jammer?" questions, the Jammers changed their logo to a cartoon grape theme. The new logo represents the strong tradition of grape-growing in Chautauqua County. On June 19, 2006, the eve of opening day, the team officially announced the name of its new mascot: Bubba Grape, the Baseball Ape.

After a decade of affiliation with the Florida/Miami Marlins, the Jammers signed a player development contract with the Pittsburgh Pirates on September 18, 2012.

Although Rich also owns the Buffalo Bisons, a higher-level minor league baseball team in the same media market, he never affiliated the two teams with the same parent club during the Jammers' time in Jamestown, and as a result, the two teams have always been in separate farm systems.

==== Relocation to Morgantown ====
Published reports released in March 2013 (and reiterated in August 2014) indicated that the Jammers were the leading candidate for relocation after the league announced it would be relocating one of its franchises to the campus of West Virginia University in Morgantown, West Virginia in 2015. The team's new name, the West Virginia Black Bears, was selected shortly after the Jammers' last game.

Rich, who will continue to own the team, confirmed the news in a press conference on August 25, 2014, as did officials from the city of Jamestown, who indicated that the New York–Penn League had been trying to get out of Jamestown for several years. The league had been in the city continuously since 1960 and intermittently since the league's launch in 1939, long after nearby cities such as Bradford, Olean and Wellsville had lost their pro teams; it was one of only two of the league's charter cities still with a team, and the other, Batavia, returned its franchise to the league after the 2017 season. Most of the remaining teams in upstate New York below the AAA level are slated for shutdown in 2020. Rich Baseball still had one year remaining on its lease with Diethrick Park, and it is unknown how the team fulfilled the terms of the lease. Attendance declines were a major factor in the team's departure; while in 2009, the team was still drawing close to the league average in attendance, the team averaged less than 800 fans per game in 2014 and had lost half of its attendance in the past five years (this may have also been a result of the fans knowing the team was leaving). The other factor in the team's departure was the decrepitude of Russell Diethrick Park; other teams in the league were refusing to use the facilities there, and the attendance declines made it impossible to fund upgrades that the city and other entities that used the ballpark also refused to finance.

== Later use of the Jamestown Jammers name in baseball ==
Another team bearing the Jamestown Jammers name played in the Prospect League, an amateur collegiate summer baseball league, in 2015. A new Jammers team began play in 2016 as a member of the Perfect Game Collegiate Baseball League. That team was abruptly shut down after the 2018 season when its owners shifted its focus to teams closer to its home base in Milwaukee, leaving behind the Jammers name for the next ownership group that wants to set up a team in Jamestown.

The nonprofit holding company entrusted with the Jammers intellectual property did not anticipate being able to field a team in 2019 and intended to rejoin the PGCBL in 2020 at the time of the closure. As of April 2019, this timetable remained unchanged. (This would be postponed again to 2021 due to prohibitions on large gatherings during the COVID-19 pandemic in New York (state) that did not allow the 2020 season to be played.) In a surprise October 2019 announcement, the new Jamestown baseball team announced it was abandoning the Jammers name and would be soliciting suggestions for a new brand. The new brand, Jamestown Tarp Skunks, was revealed in January 2020.

== Season records ==
Season	W	L	Finish (games back of leader)	Playoffs
2014	35	40	2nd in Pinckney Division (12.5 GB)	Out of playoffs
2013	43	32	2nd in Pinckney Division (5 GB)	Lost Semifinals (State College Spikes)
2012	35	40	3rd in Pinckney Division (10.5 GB)	Out of playoffs
2011	35	40	5th in Pinckney Division (10 GB)	Out of playoffs
2010	43	32	2nd in Pinckney Division (2.5 GB)	Lost Semifinals (Brooklyn Cyclones)
2009	34	42	5th in Pinckney Division (15 GB)	Out of playoffs
2008	47	29	2nd in Pinckney Division (0 GB)*	Won Semifinals (Staten Island Yankees); Lost Championship (Batavia Muckdogs)
2007	28	47	6th in Pinckney Division (18.5 GB)	Out of playoffs
2006	33	39	5th in Pinckney Division (8 GB)	Out of playoffs
2005	31	44	4th in Pinckney Division (14 GB)	Out of playoffs
2004	30	45	3rd in Pinckney Division (20.5 GB)	Out of playoffs
2003	22	51	4th in Pinckney Division (33.5 GB)	Out of playoffs
2002	32	42	4th in Pinckney Division (14 GB)	Out of playoffs
2001	39	36	2nd in Pinckney Division (9.5 GB)	Lost Semifinals (Williamsport Crosscutters)
2000	36	38	3rd in Pinckney Division (11 GB)	Out of playoffs
1999	38	38	4th in Pinckney Division (5 GB)	Out of playoffs
1998	32	43	3rd in Pinckney Division (12.5 GB)	Out of playoffs
1997	25	49	4th in Stedler Division (24 GB)	Out of playoffs
1996	39	36	3rd in Stedler Division (4.5 GB)	Out of playoffs
1995	32	44	4th in Stedler Division (9.5 GB)	Out of playoffs
1994	42	32	1st in Stedler Division (0 GB)	Lost Semifinals (New Jersey Cardinals)

* – The Jammers and Batavia Muckdogs finished in a virtual tie for first place in the Pinckney Division in the 2008 season; however, the Muckdogs played two fewer games, finishing at 46–28 to the Jammers' 47–29. The Muckdogs' .622 winning percentage gave them the division title over the Jammers' .618.
