= Ryan Martin (soccer coach) =

American soccer coach (born 1983)

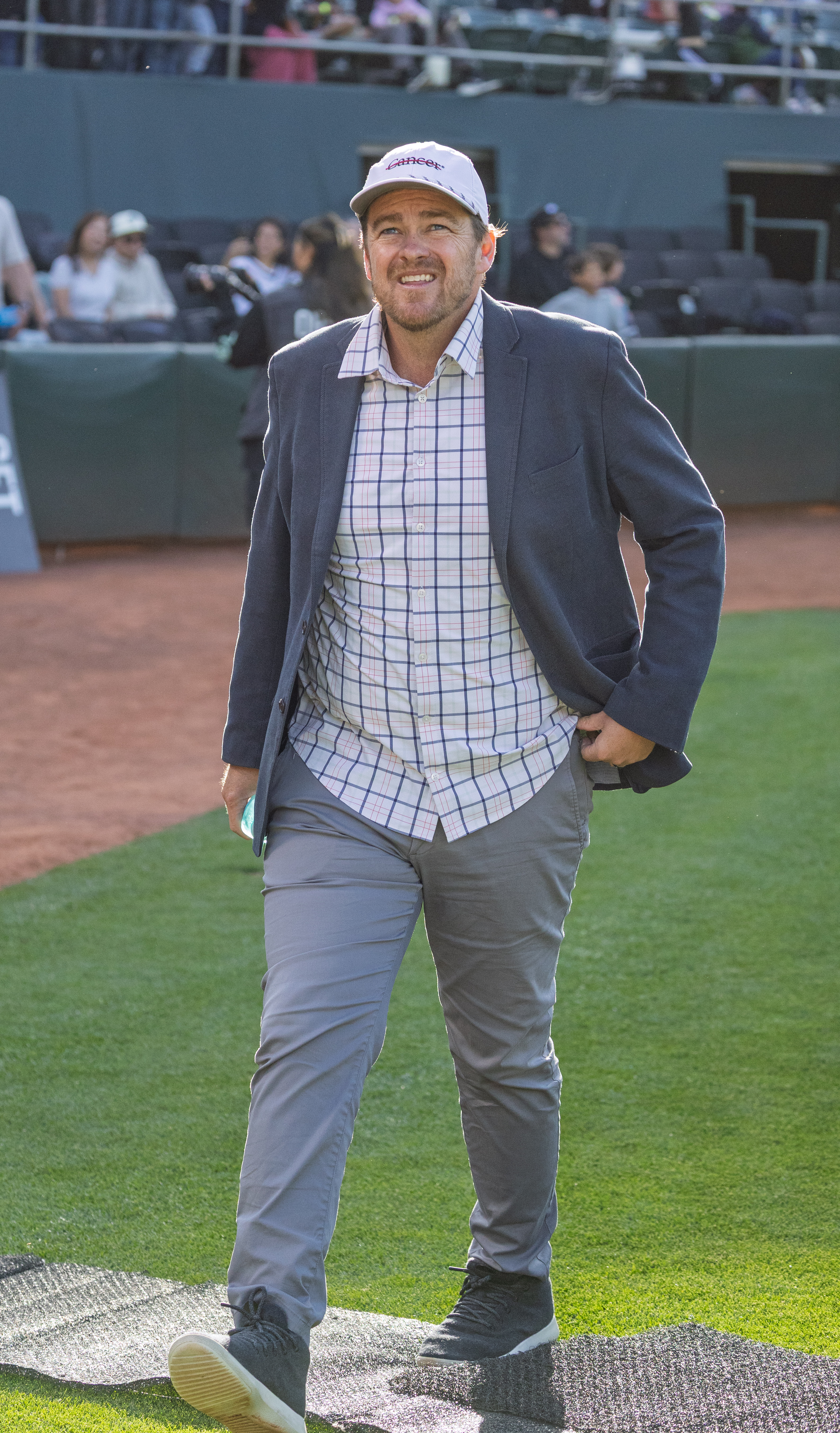
- Martin in 2026

Personal information
- Date of birth: May 19, 1983 (age 43)
- Place of birth: Columbus, Ohio

College career
| Years | Team | Apps | (Gls) |
| 2001–2005 | Ohio Wesleyan Battling Bishops | | (30) |

Managerial career
- 2007–2015: Wake Forest Demon Deacons (assistant)
- 2014–2015: Toronto FC (scout)
- 2015: Columbus Crew (U23 coach & scout)
- 2015–2016: FC Cincinnati (assistant)
- 2017–2019: D.C. United (academy director)
- 2019–2025: Loudoun United
- 2026–: Oakland Roots

Ryan Martin is an American soccer coach. He is the head coach of Oakland Roots SC, a team that plays in second division USL Championship. He was previously the head coach of Loudoun United FC of the same league, and assistant coach with MLS side FC Cincinnati.

Martin played at Ohio Wesleyan University from 2001 to 2005 and was inducted to the Ohio Wesleyan Battling Bishops Hall of Fame in 2016.
