= Robert E. Rich Jr. =

American businessman and writer (born 1941)

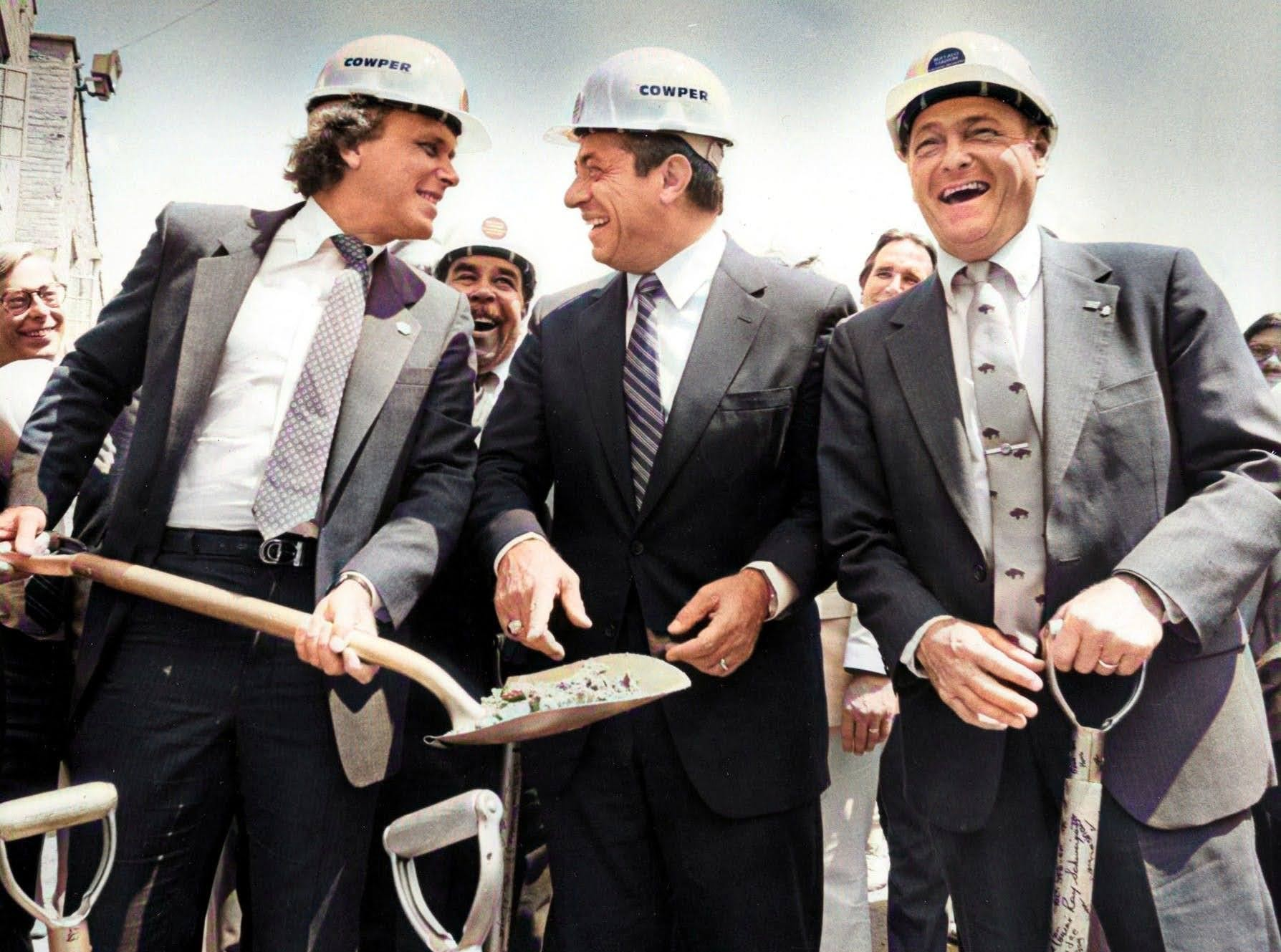
- Rich at the groundbreaking of Pilot Field in 1986, to the left of Governor Mario Cuomo and Mayor James D. Griffin
- Born: January 25, 1941 (age 85)
- Education: Williams College; University of Rochester (M.B.A.)
- Occupations: Chairman, Rich Products
- Political party: Independent
- Spouse: Mindy Rich
- Children: 4
- Father: Robert E. Rich Sr.

Robert E. Rich Jr. (born January 25, 1941), also known as Bob Rich, is an American businessman, philanthropist and writer. He is chairman and majority owner of Rich Products (Rich's), a food processing company headquartered in Buffalo, New York.

== Early life ==
Robert E. Rich Jr. graduated from Williams College with a bachelor's degree in 1963 and Simon Business School in 1969 an MBA degree.

== Career ==
=== Rich Products ===
In 1964 he joined Rich Products, a company started by his father, as president of a start up subsidiary, Rich Products of Canada. Rich was in the United States National Guard from 1963 to 1969 and a member of the Army Reserve Officer school staff. He also earned an MBA from Simon Business School at the University of Rochester in 1969. Moving to Rich's American headquarters that year, he created the company's first marketing department and took on the new role of vice president of sales and marketing. In 1978 he was named President of Rich's.

When his father died in Palm Beach, Florida in 2006, Robert Jr was elected to the position of chairman of Rich Products.

=== Board roles ===
In 1969, Rich was an investor and member of the inaugural board of directors of the Buffalo Sabres of the National Hockey League and later became Vice Chairman of that professional hockey team.

In 1983, Rich Products Corp. purchased the Buffalo Bisons minor league baseball team. The Bisons are the AAA affiliate of the Toronto Blue Jays. Rich's also owns the Northwest Arkansas Naturals (the AA affiliate of the Kansas City Royals), and the West Virginia Black Bears, charter members of the Major League Baseball Draft League. Rich is chairman of those three baseball clubs and is also a member of the Trustees Council of the University of Rochester.

Rich has chaired many industry organizations including the National Frozen Food Association (NFFA), the Uniform Code Council (Bar Codes) the Grocery Manufacturers Association (GMA) and Enactus (formerly Students in Free Enterprise - SIFE).

Rich was elected to the board of directors of Cleveland Clinic in 2002 and chaired philanthropy and a fundraising campaign for the Clinic that raised more than $1.5 billion. He then was chairman of Cleveland Clinic for two four-year terms from 2011 to 2019. He remains involved with the Clinic today, is their chairman emeritus and assisted in their Centennial Campaign that has raised $2.5 billion.

=== Writing ===
Rich has authored five books, the proceeds of which were donated to charities including the Cystic Fibrosis Foundation, Boys and Girls Clubs of Western New York, Project Healing Waters, and has co-written a sixth. His fifth book, a novel, titled Looking Through Water, was adapted into a film of the same name, which was released in 2025.

== Personal life ==
Rich is married and has four children. His wife, Mindy, is vice chairman of Rich Products and has been with the company for more than 37 years.

Politically, Rich is an Independent.
