= Loudoun United FC =

American soccer team

- Full name: Loudoun United Football Club
- Founded: July 18, 2018; 8 years ago
- Stadium: Segra Field; Leesburg, Virginia, U.S.
- Capacity: 5,000
- Owners: Attain Sports and Entertainment (majority); D.C. United (minority)
- Head coach: Anthony Limbrick
- League: USL Championship
- 2025: 6th, Eastern Conference; Playoffs: Lost in 1st Round
- Website: loudoununitedfc.com
Home colors	Away colors

Loudoun United FC is an American professional soccer team based in Leesburg, Virginia. The team was founded in 2018 as the reserve team of D.C. United and made its debut in the USL Championship in 2019. After Ownership changes, it ceased being the reserve squad for D.C. in 2023.

== History ==
On July 18, 2018, the team was officially announced by USL and D.C. United as were the team's name, colors and crest. Loudoun United FC replaced Richmond Kickers as D.C. United's USL affiliate.

After the founding of MLS Next Pro in 2022 and the subsequent movement of MLS reserve teams to that league by 2023, Loudoun United remained the only MLS-affiliated reserve side in the USL system; due to a legal agreement for leasing Segra Field, United is required to play in the second division.

On February 2, 2023, Loudoun United FC was sold to Attain Sports and Entertainment, which owns minor league baseball teams Bowie Baysox and Frederick Keys. D.C. United will continue to own a minority stake in Loudoun United. Furthermore, the change of ownership also meant that Loudoun United was eligible to participate in the 2023 U.S. Open Cup.

On April 17, 2025, it was announced that Loudoun United FC would merge with the Virginia Revolution Soccer Club, a youth and pre-professional soccer club with teams in MLS Next and the United Premier Soccer League. As part of this merger, the club announced on December 2, 2025 that the united organization would host a pre-professional team in USL2, in the Chesapeake Division of the Eastern Conference, known simply as Loudoun United FC 2. VA Revolution coach Matthew Mountford was tapped to be the coach of this new team, with their debut set for the 2026 season. Loudoun United later announced the formation of a women's team under their same organization and brand, to play in the Mid Atlantic Division of the USL W League in 2026.

== Colors and badge ==
Loudoun United FC colors are black, red and white, the same as, at the time, parent club D.C. United. The club's crest contains the red-and-white gyronny seen in the flag and coat of arms of Loudoun County, as well as a winged horse in homage to both D.C. United's eagle logo and the county's long association with equestrian sports.

=== Sponsorship ===
Season	Kit manufacturer	Shirt sponsor
2019–2021	Adidas	The National
2022	Adidas	—
2023	Adidas	Betfred USA
2024–present	Capelli Sport	CORAS

== Stadium ==
The club plays at Segra Field, a new 5,000-seat stadium at Philip A. Bolen Memorial Park in Leesburg. The stadium was built by D.C. United and the county government for $15 million. Construction began in 2018, and was completed in August 2019. After playing some initial home games at Audi Field, they debuted in their new stadium in a game against the Charlotte Independence that ended 3–3 in front of 5,015 spectators.

== Club culture ==
The main supporter group of Loudoun United is the Loudoun Stampede. The supporter group hosts tailgates, events, and watch parties.

== Players and staff ==
=== Roster ===
As of September 10, 2026

Note: Flags indicate national team as defined under FIFA eligibility rules; some limited exceptions apply. Players may hold more than one non-FIFA nationality.

No.	Pos.	Nation	Player
2	DF	USA	Noah Adnan
4	DF	USA	Aidan O'Connor
5	DF	CAN	Salvatore Mazzaferro
6	DF	CAN	Kwame Awuah
7	MF	BDI	Pacifique Niyongabire
8	MF	USA	James Murphy
11	FW	EGY	Abdellatif Aboukoura
12	DF	USA	Ezra Armstrong
14	MF	CHI	Andrés Souper

No.	Pos.	Nation	Player
18	MF	GEO	Giorgi Lomtadze
20	MF	CAN	Sean Young
21	DF	NGR	Bolu Akinyode
23	MF	USA	Akil Watts
24	DF	USA	Jacob Erlandson
28	MF	CAN	Rida Zouhir
33	DF	ITA	Luca Piras
39	FW	BRA	Marcos Dias
41	GK	USA	Ethan Bandré

Signed to first team contract with D.C. United
Signed from youth academy
Signed to 25-Day contract

=== Staff ===
As of January 24, 2025

Executive
Team President	(England) Karl Sharman
Sporting Director	(Canada) Alen Marcina
Director of Soccer Operations	(United States) Logan Angert
Technical staff
Head Coach	(Australia) Anthony Limbrick
Assistant coach	(Croatia) Dario Pot
Health and Fitness Coach	(United States) Drew Skundrich
Goalkeeping Coach	(Poland) Jack Stefanowski
Athletic Trainer	(United States) Connor Millina
Equipment Manager	Miguel Velasquez
Video Analyst	Alex Gent

== Team records ==
=== Year-by-year ===
As of March 18, 2025

Season	USL Championship								Playoffs	U.S. Open Cup	Avg. attendance	Top scorer^{1}	
Season	P	W	L	D	GF	GA	Pts	Pos	Playoffs	U.S. Open Cup	Avg. attendance	Player	Goals
2019	34	11	17	6	59	65	39	12th, Eastern	Did not qualify	Ineligible	1,381	(United States) Kyle Murphy	13
2020	13	1	9	3	10	28	6	5th, Eastern; Group F	Did not qualify	Ineligible	495	(Ghana) Elvis Amoh	4
2021	32	4	25	3	31	78	15	16th, Eastern; 8th, Atlantic	Did not qualify	Ineligible	639	(United States) Ted Ku-DiPietro	7
2022	34	8	22	4	36	74	28	11th, Eastern	Did not qualify	Ineligible	1,489	(United States) Tyler Freeman	8
2023	34	7	23	4	36	61	25	11th, Eastern	Did not qualify	R4	2,664	(United States) Zach Ryan	10
2024	34	11	14	9	44	39	31	11th, Eastern	Did not qualify	R5	2,919	(United States) Zach Ryan	10
2025	30	12	12	6	45	48	42	6th, Eastern	QF	R3	2,333	(Egypt) Abdellatif Aboukoura	12

1. Top scorer includes statistics from league matches only.

=== Head coaches ===
- Includes USL regular season, USL playoffs, U.S. Open Cup. Excludes friendlies.

Coach	Nationality	Start	End	Record							
Coach	Nationality	Start	End	P	W	D	L	GF	GA	GD	Win %
Richie Williams	United States	January 28, 2019	May 30, 2019	9	2	4	3	11	13	−2	22.22
Ryan Martin	United States	May 30, 2019	November 18, 2025	108	26	12	70	136	237	−101	24.07
Total				117	28	16	73	147	250	−103	23.93
