= Aberdeen IronBirds =

- Founded in 1977 in Utica, New York; Based in Aberdeen, Maryland since 2002

Team logo	Cap insignia

Minor league affiliations
- Class: Collegiate (2026–present)
- Previous classes: High-A (2021–2025); Class A-Short Season (2002–2020)
- League: MLB Draft League (2026–present)
- Previous leagues: South Atlantic League (2021–2025); New York–Penn League (1977–2020)

Major league affiliations
- Team: Unaffiliated (2026–present)
- Previous teams: Baltimore Orioles (2002–2025); Florida Marlins (1996–2001); Boston Red Sox (1993–1995); Chicago White Sox (1988–1992); Philadelphia Phillies (1986–1987); Independent (1981–1985); Toronto Blue Jays (1977–1980)

Minor league titles
- League titles (1): 1983
- Division titles (2): 2013; 2022
- First-half titles (1): 2022

Team data
- Name: Aberdeen IronBirds (2002–present); Utica Blue Sox (1981–2001); Utica Blue Jays (1977–1980)
- Colors: Royal blue, light blue, orange, white
- Ballpark: Ripken Stadium (2002–present)
- Previous parks: Donovan Stadium at Murnane Field (1977–2001)
- Owner(s)/ Operator(s): Attain Sports and Entertainment / Cal Ripken Jr. and Billy Ripken
- General manager: John Burks
- Manager: Preston Wilson
- Website: mlbdraftleague.com/aberdeen

The Aberdeen IronBirds are a summer collegiate baseball team based in the city of Aberdeen in Harford County, Maryland. They were previously the High-A affiliate of the Baltimore Orioles and competed in the South Atlantic League from 2021 to 2025. Prior to that, they were members of the New York–Penn League from 1977 to 2020.

The team is owned by Attain Sports and Entertainment with retired Orioles player Cal Ripken Jr maintaining a minority stake in the team after having purchased the team, then known as the Utica Blue Sox, and moved them to his hometown of Aberdeen in time for the 2002 season. The IronBirds play their home games at Ripken Stadium, which is visible from I-95. On August 16, 2006, the IronBirds played host to the New York–Penn League All-Star Game. They also hosted the New York-Penn League All-Star Game on August 18, 2015. Ripken Stadium was also used for the Cal Ripken World Series in 2003 and 2004, forcing the team to go on extended road trips, 20 or more games, during the youth competition. The Cal Ripken World Series moved across the street to Cal Sr.'s Yard in 2005.

The name "IronBirds" was chosen for two reasons: Cal Ripken's "Ironman" streak of 2,632 consecutive baseball games played and the team's affiliation with the Orioles (the Baltimore team is often referred to as "The Birds"). The former team logo featured a silver airplane marked with Ripken's number 8, which also refers to the nearby Aberdeen Proving Ground U.S. Army installation. The team mascots are gray birds named Ferrous and Ripcord.

The record of most RBIs in a single month was set by Robbie Widlansky in July 2008. On August 26, 2013, Conor Bierfeldt hit his 12th home run of the season, setting a new IronBirds single-season record. He broke the previous record held by David Anderson set in the 2010 season. On September 2, 2013, The IronBirds clinched their first McNamara Division Title.

In conjunction with Major League Baseball's restructuring of Minor League Baseball in 2021, the IronBirds were organized into the 12-team High-A East. In 2022, the High-A East became known as the South Atlantic League, the name historically used by the regional circuit prior to the 2021 reorganization.

The IronBirds' 2012 and 2013 seasons were the subject of a book written by the team's former clubhouse attendant, Greg Larson. Clubbie: A Minor League Baseball Memoir was released in 2021.

In October 2024, Cal Ripken Jr. and his brother Billy Ripken sold their majority stake to Attain Sports Partners, owners of the Chesapeake Baysox, the Orioles’ Double-A affiliate, and the Frederick Keys of the MLB Draft League. In August 2025, it was announced that the Keys would replace the IronBirds as the Orioles' High-A affiliate, with the IronBirds moving to the MLB Draft League.

== Playoffs ==
- 2013 season: Lost to Tri-City 2–0 in semifinals.
- 2022 Season: Won against Brooklyn Cyclones 2–1 in Division Series. Lost to Bowling Green Hot Rods 2–1 in Championship Series.

== Notable franchise alumni ==
- Miguel Cabrera (2000) 2x MVP, 12x MLB All-star, World Series Champion
- Adrián González (2000) 5x MLB All-star, 2x Gold Glove winner
- Andy Ashby (1987) 2x MLB All-Star
- James Baldwin (1991) MLB All-Star
- Jesse Barfield (1977) MLB All-Star
- Zack Britton (2007)
- Ken Brett (1985, MGR) MLB All-Star
- Mike Cameron (1992) MLB All-Star
- Colton Cowser (2022)
- Ray Durham (1991) 2x MLB All-Star
- Jason Grimsley (1986)
- Gunnar Henderson (2021) MLB All-Star; 2023 AL Rookie Of The Year
- David Hernandez (2005)
- Jackson Holliday (2023)
- Fred Kendall (1992, MGR)
- Manny Machado (2010) 4x MLB All-Star
- Trey Mancini (2013)
- Nick Markakis (2003) MLB All-Star
- Chuck McElroy (1986)
- Adley Rutschman (2019) 2x MLB All-Star
- Tony Taylor (1986–1987, MGR)
- Larry Walker (1985) 5x MLB All-Star; 1997 NL Most Valuable Player

== Roster ==
Aberdeen IronBirds roster
Players	Coaches/Other
Pitchers: 24 Harold Baez; 3 Aaron Calhoun; 39 Valek Cisneros; 9 Ian Cooke; 45 Anderson Cuello-Batista; 49 Blake Donnan; 23 Brooks Ey; 36 Joshua Lanham; 25 Jace Miner; 11 Paul Panduro; 17 Randy Reyes; 35 Esteban Rodriguez; 26 Davis Smith; Catchers: 21 Irvin Escobar; 14 Dylan Symonds; Infielders: 7 Parks Bouck; 13 Bryan Loriga; 19 Ethan Ott; 27 Bronson Rivera; Outfielders: 2 Trey Lipsey; 10 Cam Pittman; 51 Jamal Ritter	Manager: 44 Preston Wilson; Coaches: 7-day injured list; ~ Development list; # Rehab assignment; ∞ Reserve list; ‡ Restricted list; § Suspended list; † Temporarily inactive list; Roster updated April 24, 2026; → More MiLB rosters

== See also ==
- Category:Aberdeen IronBirds players
