= Americare =

Americare or AmeriCare may refer to

- AmeriCares, non-profit disaster relief and global health organization
- Americare Companies founded by Elly Kleinman, health care services in New York
- Americare Group, part of NMC Health, healthcare business in Abu Dhabi
- Americare School of Nursing, part of Lincoln Tech, nursing schools in Fern Park and St. Petersburg, Florida
- Americare Senior Living, also known as Americare Corporation, partnered with Sinclair School of Nursing, senior home services in Missouri
- North AmeriCare, now known as Univera Healthcare, now part of Excellus, health insurance in New York
  - North AmeriCare Park, now known as Sahlen Field, home of the minor league Buffalo Bisons, in Buffalo, New York
