= Kleinman =

Kleinman (Yiddish: קליינמאַן, קלייַנמאַן, Hebrew: קליינמן, Russian: Клейнман, Кляйнман) is a surname.

Notable people with the surname include:

- Andy Kleinman (born 1981), Argentine businessman
- Arthur Kleinman (born 1941), American psychiatrist and medical anthropologist of China
- Daniel Kleinman (born 1955), British computer graphics artist
- Elly Kleinman (born 1952), American business executive and philanthropist
- Fay Kleinman (1912–2012), American painter
- Fryderyk Kleinman (1897–1943, killed at the Janowska concentration camp), Polish painter
- Geoffrey Kleinman (born 1970), editor of DVDTalk
- Hadar Kleinman (born 1970), Israeli swimmer
- Hen Yisrael Kleinman or Hen Yesodot (born 1979), Israeli poet
- Nathan "Nate" Kleinman, American farmer and activist
- Pablo Kleinman (born 1971), Argentine-American journalist
- Ralph E[llis]. Kleinman (1929–1998), American mathematician
- Ron Kleinman (born 1965), Israeli law professor
- Steven Kleinman, officer in the United States Air Force Reserve

== See also ==
- Kleinmann
- Klineman
