= Stargaze =

Stargaze can refer to:

- Stargazing, amateur astronomical activity
- Stargaze (musical collective), musical collective founded by André de Ridder
- StarGaze, annual charity event in Buffalo, New York
