= Sahlen's Stadium =

Sahlen’s Stadium may refer to:

- the main stadium of WakeMed Soccer Park (Cary, North Carolina)
- Marina Auto Stadium (Rochester, New York), formerly known under this name

== See also ==
- Sahlen Field
