= RCCS =

RCCS may stand for:

- Rofeh Cholim Cancer Society
- Rotary Cell Culture System
- Royal Canadian Corps of Signals
