= DVD Talk =

US home video news and review website

- Website type: Film criticism Online community
- Available in: English
- Owner: Internet Brands
- Website: dvdtalk.com
- Commercial: Yes
- Launched: January 19, 1999; 27 years ago
- Current status: Online, no new content since January 2023

DVD Talk is a home video news and review website launched in 1999 by Geoffrey Kleinman.

== History ==
Kleinman founded the site in January 1999 in Beaverton, Oregon. Besides news and reviews, it features information on hidden DVD features known as "Easter eggs". In 2000, posts to their forum led Amazon.com to cease the practice of dynamic pricing. In 2007, the site was sold to Internet Brands. As of January 2023, the reviews and editorial blog have ceased updating. The higher-traffic bulletin board/forum remains operational and active.

== Reception ==
Shawn Levy of The Oregonian called it "worth a visit", and Randy Salas of the Star Tribune recommended it as a source of information for DVDs. It was used at one time by industry insiders to gauge interest in DVD titles.
