= Klineman =

Klineman is a surname derived from its German equivalent Kleinman, meaning "small man". Notable people with the surname include:

- Alix Klineman (born 1989), American volleyball player
- Hedy Klineman, American painter
- Kent Klineman, actor and musician
