= Ladies League Baseball =

American women's baseball league

- Sport: Baseball
- Founded: 1997
- Folded: 1998
- Country: United States

After the 1992 movie A League of Their Own, a film based on the All-American Girls Professional Baseball League, the Ladies Professional Baseball League, also known as the Ladies League Baseball, was founded in 1997. The first five teams in the league were the San Jose Spitfire, San Francisco Bay Sox, Long Beach Aces, Phoenix Peppers and Los Angeles Legends. It was the first professional women's baseball league to operate in the U.S. since the All-American Girls Professional Baseball League ceased operations in 1954.

== 1997 season ==
In the 1997 season, the league initially consisted of five teams: the San Jose Spitfire, San Francisco Bay Sox, Long Beach Aces, Phoenix Peppers and Los Angeles Legends. Midway through the season, the league merged together the Spitfire and Bay Sox due to issues with completing their rosters, with the Spitfires absorbing the Bay Sox in the merger. In the league's championship the San Jose Spitfires defeated the Los Angeles Legends. Janelle T. Frese of the Los Angeles Legends won the Ladies League Baseball "Most Outstanding Pitcher" award for the 1997 season.

In 1997 the Long Beach Aces played at Blair Field in Long Beach, California, the home of the Long Beach State University baseball program. They were coached by Don Barbara, former professional player and assistant coach at Sacramento State. Barbara played at Long Beach State and was a Dirtbag assistant coach, later becoming the head recruiter and hitting coach at Sacramento State.

The Aces were also coached by Joe Magno, who assumed the role of Aces bench coach. Magno was a scout with the Cincinnati Reds and later became a minor league bench coach for the Western Baseball League champion Long Beach Breakers in 2001. Magno's coaching career started as an assistant coach at Eckerd College in St. Petersburg, Florida, and continued at Long Beach State, where he ran the Dirtbags showcase camps from 1995 to 1997. Magno later coached high school baseball at Mayfair High School in Lakewood, California.

== Expansion ==
In 1998, the league expanded and changed its name to the Ladies Professional Baseball League. The league expanded eastward by adding teams in Buffalo, New York, and Augusta, New Jersey, and moving the Los Angeles Legends to Homestead, Florida. The newly expanded league planned a 56-game schedule starting in July and ending in September.

== Cancellation ==
The Ladies Professional Baseball League canceled its second season after only 12 games were played. Michael Ribant, league president and founder, blamed low fan turnout. The average attendance was less than 500 per game. The projected losses for the 1998 season became too great, and the league folded.

== Teams ==
Team	City	Ballpark	First season
Buffalo Nighthawks	Buffalo, New York	Sahlen Field	1998
Florida Legends	Homestead, Florida		1998
Long Beach Aces	Long Beach, California	Blair Field	1997
Los Angeles Legends	Los Angeles, California		1997
New Jersey Diamonds	Augusta, New Jersey		1998
Phoenix Peppers	Phoenix, Arizona	Scottsdale Stadium	1997
San Francisco Bay Sox	San Francisco, California		1997
San Jose Spitfires	San Jose, California	San Jose Municipal Stadium	1997
