= Kleinmann =

Kleinmann is a common surname:

- Dieter Kleinmann (born 1953), German politician
- Georges Kleinmann, a French journalist
- Larissa Kleinmann (born 1978), German cyclist
- Louis Théodore Kleinmann (1907–1979), a French officer
- Ralf Kleinmann (born 1971, Cologne, Germany), a German-American football player
- Wilhelm Otto Max Kleinmann (1876–1945), a German railway official and politician
- Kleinmann's tortoise, Egyptian tortoise or Leith's tortoise (Testudo kleinmanni)

== See also ==
- Kleinman
- Kleiman
