= StarGaze =

Charity event in Buffalo, New York

StarGaze logo

StarGaze was an annual charity event that was promoted by Buffalo Bills quarterback Jim Kelly from 1992 to 1995.

== Format ==
StarGaze was originally conceived after Jim Kelly held a million-dollar football toss as part of his private Jim Kelly Celebrity Classic golf tournament, and it was decided to open the football toss portion of the weekend to the public. Kelly started the golf tournament at East Aurora Country Club in 1987 to raise money for his Kelly for Kids Foundation, and all proceeds from StarGaze went towards the organization.

The public events beginning in 1992 featured an All-Star Softball Game, Home Run Derby, and finished with the Million Dollar Shootout.

The object of the Shootout was to throw a football 30 yards into a hole two inches larger than the width of the ball, with the winner splitting $1,000,000 between themselves and the charity of their choice. No celebrity won the $1,000,000 in the history of the events. However, for the final public event in 1995, the Shootout was changed to a 20-yard throw for a trip to Australia. Nate Turner successfully completed the 20-yard throw and won the trip.

Kelly continued hosting his annual celebrity golf tournament at East Aurora Country Club, and in 2006 it moved to Terry Hills Golf Course in Batavia, NY.

== History ==
=== Jim Kelly Shootout and Carnival of Stars ===
June 7, 1992 in Buffalo, New York (Pilot Field)

14.500 in attendance / $150,000 raised

Hosted by Cris Collinsworth and Paul Maguire

- Bernie Kosar
- Beverly Johnson
- Billy Joe Tolliver
- Brandon Hooper
- Browning Nagle
- Bruce Smith
- Carwell Gardner
- Chelsea Noble
- Cheryl Richardson
- Chris Noth
- Dan Marino
- Darren Puppa
- Darryl Talley
- David Klingler
- Donald Trump
- Don Beebe
- Don Majkowski
- Earl Morrall
- Frank Reich
- Gale Gilbert
- Hal Garner
- Howard Ballard
- Jeff George
- Jim Kelly
- Jim Kiick
- Joe Namath
- John Congemi
- John Elway
- John Havlicek
- John Kidd
- Judd Nelson
- Keith McKeller
- Kent Hull
- Kirk Cameron
- Marla Maples
- Mike Hartman
- Neil Lomax
- Nick Buoniconti
- Pete Metzelaars
- Randall Cunningham
- Roman Gabriel
- Shane Conlan
- Steve Beuerlein
- Steve Tasker
- Steve Walsh
- Troy Aikman
- Vinny Testaverde
- Virginia Madsen
- Wally Kurth
- Walter Payton
- Warren Moon

=== StarGaze 1993 ===
June 13, 1993 in Buffalo, New York (Pilot Field)

10,000 in attendance / $100,000 raised

Hosted by Paul Maguire and Ray Combs

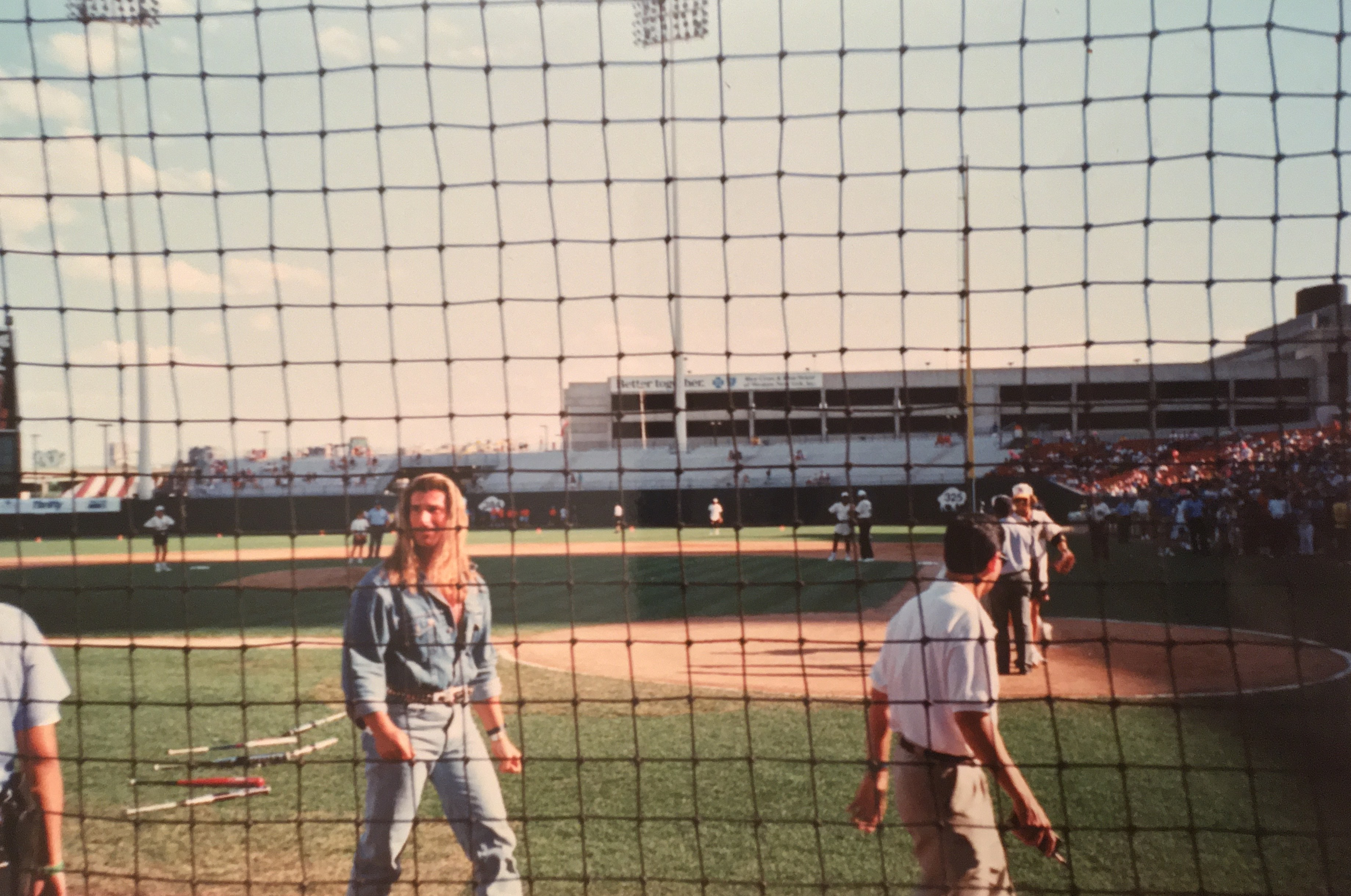
StarGaze 1993. Fabio is in the foreground.

- Alexander Mogilny
- Bernie Kosar
- Beverly Johnson
- Beverly Peele
- Brad May
- Bruce Smith
- Cheryl Richardson
- Christopher Lawford
- Dan Marino
- Darryl Talley
- Dennis Cole
- Donald Trump
- Don Beebe
- Downtown Julie Brown
- Eugene Lockhart
- Fabio
- Forry Smith
- Frank Reich
- Fred Smerlas
- Gale Gilbert
- Grant Ledyard
- Howard Ballard
- Jack Trudeau
- Jeff George
- Jim Kelly
- Jim Kiick
- Joe Namath
- Joe Theismann
- John Kidd
- Josh Taylor
- Kathleen Madigan
- Kent Hull
- Kirk Cameron
- Markus Flanagan
- Maxwell Caulfield
- Melody Anderson
- Natasha Alexandrovna
- Pat LaFontaine
- Pete Metzelaars
- Phil Housley
- Rob Ray
- Shane Conlan
- Steve Bartkowski
- Ted Marchibroda
- Tony Guzman
- Troy Aikman
- Vincent Spano
- Warren Moon

=== StarGaze 1994 ===
June 5, 1994 in Amherst, New York (University at Buffalo Stadium)

10,000 in attendance / $100,000 raised

Hosted by Ray Combs and Will McDonough

- Alan Thicke
- Alexander Mogilny
- Anthony Miller
- Bernie Kosar
- Boomer Esiason
- Brad May
- Bruce Smith
- Chelsea Noble
- Cheryl Richardson
- Dan Marino
- Don Beebe
- Don Majkowski
- Earl Morrall
- Eddie Van Halen
- Forry Smith
- Frank Reich
- Fred Smerlas
- Jason Bateman
- Jerry Behrens
- Jim Kelly
- Jim Ritcher
- John Kidd
- John Muckler
- John Tavares
- Kent Hull
- Kirk Cameron
- Marv Levy
- Paul Hornung
- Phil Housley
- Rob Lowe
- Rob Ray
- Rudy Pikuzinski
- Shane Conlan
- Steve Tasker (won Home Run Derby)
- Thurman Thomas
- Valerie Bertinelli
- Warren Moon
- Will Wolford

=== StarGaze 1995 ===
June 11, 1995 in Rochester, New York (Silver Stadium)

7,000 in attendance / $150,000 raised

Hosted by Paul Maguire and Ray Combs

- Alex Van Pelt
- Bernie Kosar
- Boomer Esiason
- Brad May
- Branscombe Richmond
- Bruce Smith
- Bucky Brooks
- Carwell Gardner
- Corey Louchiey
- Craig Muni
- Dan Marino
- Darryl Talley
- Don Majkowski
- Downtown Julie Brown
- Drew Bledsoe
- Earl Morrall
- Eugene Lockhart
- Frank Reich
- Fred Smerlas
- Glenn Parker
- Jack Trudeau
- James Lofton
- Jason Dawe
- Jeff Burris
- Jeff George
- Jerry Ostroski
- Jesse Sapolu
- Jim Kelly
- Jim Ritcher
- John Elway
- Jon Kidd
- Keith Byars
- Kent Hull
- Matthew Barnaby
- Matt Bahr
- Maurice Hurst
- Meat Loaf
- Mike Devlin
- Nate Turner (won Shootout)
- Pete Metzelaars
- Phil Hansen
- Phil Housley
- Phil Simms
- Rob Ray
- Rod Bernstine
- Sinjin Smith
- Steve DeOssie
- Steve Tasker
- Thurman Thomas
- Todd Collins
- Tom Hallick
- Tony Siragusa
- Vencie Glenn
- Warren Moon
- Will Wolford
