= Geoffrey Kleinman =

American writer

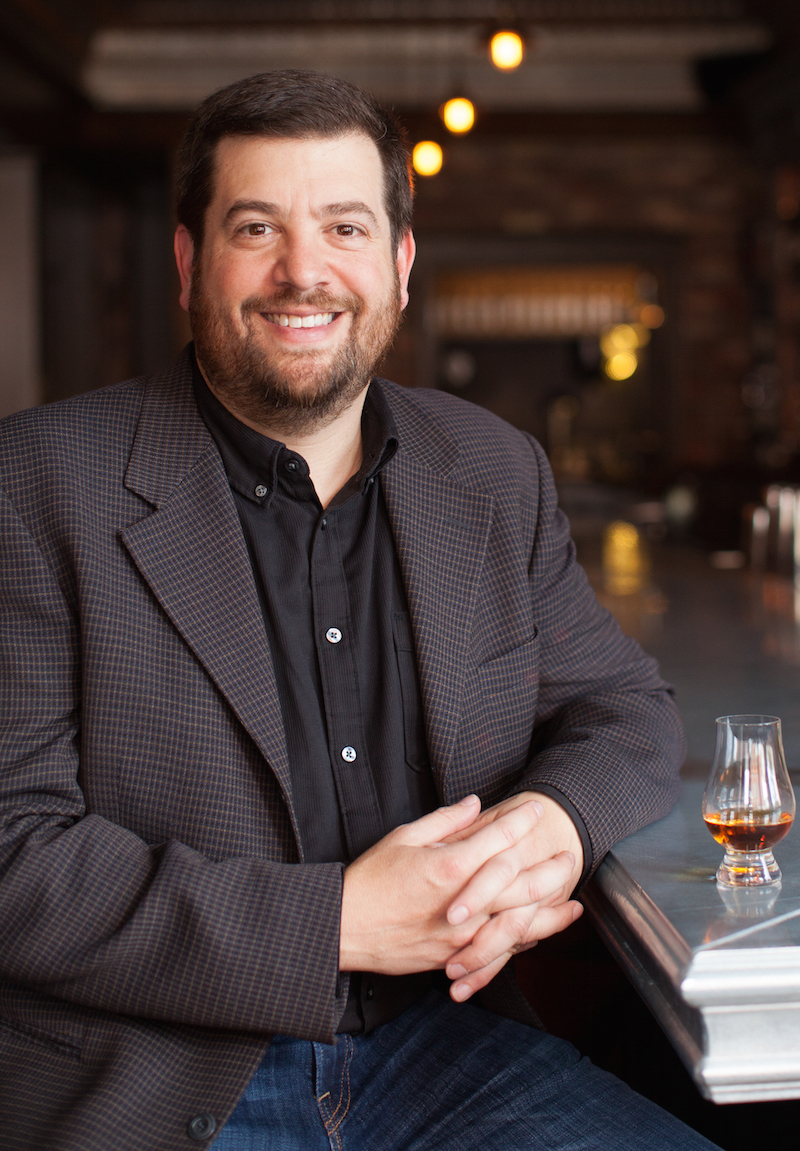
- Kleinman in 2015
- Born: November 21, 1970 (age 55); Moraga, California, U.S.
- Education: Ithaca College (BS)
- Occupations: Writer, web designer
- Website: kleinman.com

Geoffrey Kleinman (born November 21, 1970) is an American writer. He is the founder of Kleinman.com the company which started and ultimately sold DVD Talk and which runs DrinkSpirits.com.

== Biography ==
After graduating with a B.S. in cinema photography from Ithaca College in 1992, Kleinman moved to Los Angeles to work a film editor. Following short stints at CAA, and as an assistant editor on the film The Last Shot he moved to Portland Oregon to work in Internet technology.

In Portland he worked at Vulcan's Forge Multimedia (one of the first web design companies in Portland, Oregon); from there he moved to One World Internetworking, an early Internet service provider focused on business hosting.

In 1995, while working at One World Internetworking, he started his first online venture, which was initially called The Bi-Weekly Business Internet Report. but after a few issues became The Kleinman Report, which helped evangelize business use of the internet. In 1995 Kleinman covered Internet World, where a young David Filo and Jerry Yang (still students at Stanford) were publicly showing off, for the first time, their search engine Yahoo!

In 1996 he was recruited by Intel as an Internet marketing project manager where he worked on the Intel Internet Connection Wizard for Proshare technology which was ultimately integrated into the release of Windows 98. After a corporate reorganization he was tasked with development for the "Intel Owner's Club", an online community aimed at building affinity with Intel with owners of Intel products. That project was the predecessor for The Intel Web Outfitters Service IWOS, a multimillion-dollar venture.

On January 20, 1995, Kleinman launched DVD Talk, which began as a small DVD news site and forum. Over the course of 8 1/2 years, the site grew from a 'one man band' to a full-fledged online magazine with a staff of 60 writers. In early 2004 Kleinman posted an audio interview Blu-Ray and High-Definition – A DVD Talk Audio Interview which would become the foundation for one of the first podcast. In January 2005 the podcast would officially launch as DVD Talk Radio with the premiere episode, an Interview with Henry Rollins.

Another key milestone at DVD Talk was a battle with Walt Disney Studios Home Entertainment, in September 2000, over the DVD Release of Princess Mononoke, whose US DVD release was initially announced without the original Japanese soundtrack and subtitles. After collecting thousands of electronic signatures, DVD Talk Editor, Kleinman presented them in person at the 2000 Video Software Dealer's Association Meeting to the VP of Home Entertainment at Walt Disney Studios Home Entertainment. The result was the studio reversing their decision and adding the Japanese language and subtitles to the DVD US DVD release. In September 2007 DVD Talk was sold to Internet Brands.

During his time at DVD Talk, Kleinman contributed to various independent film projects, including serving as a post-production and distribution adviser on The Puffy Chair (2005), Film Geek (2005) and 10 Questions for the Dalai Lama (2006).

Kleinman was active in both covering film festivals, as well as speaking at them, most recently participating in "So You Made a Film, Now What?" at Oregon's BendFilm Festival (2007). He is also regularly asked to serve on selection committees and juries for film exhibitions and festivals such as Pine Film and BendFilm.

Kleinman was often called on to be a professional source for the home entertainment industry and has been cited as an expert opinion, especially in regards to the HD format war.

In 2010 Kleinman launched DrinkSpirits.com, an online magazine dedicated to discussing and reviewing distilled spirits.

In 2011 Kleinman was selected as a judge for the San Francisco World Spirits Competition and was cited as a "renowned journalist". He returned in 2012 to judge and again judged the competition in 2013.

In 2012 Kleinman was awarded the honor of Kentucky Colonel from Steve Beshear, the governor of the Commonwealth of Kentucky.

In 2013 Kleinman received official accreditation from the Beverage Alcohol Resource Group as "Bar Certified", one of the highest certifications for a spirits professional. He was also nominated under the category of Best Cocktail Writing – Author for the Tales of The Cocktail Spirited Awards .

In 2015 Kleinman was selected as a judge for the Ultimate Spirits Challenge. and penned the piece Behind the Scenes of the Ultimate Spirits Challenge . He was also awarded Gold Certification from the BNIC (Bureau National Interprofessionnel du Cognac) as a Certified Cognac Educator.

Kleinman currently resides in Marblehead, Massachusetts, with his wife Heather and three children – Hannah, Aaron and Ivy.

== Books and plays ==
He has contributed to several books: Podcast Solutions: The Complete Guide to Podcasting (Solutions) by Michael Geoghegan and Dan Klass, Net Words: Creating High-Impact Online Copy by Nick Usborne, and Poor Richard's Email Publishing (with Chris Pirillo). He was thanked in DF Walker's novel Darius Logan: Super Justice Force.

In 2007, Kleinman's one-act play Love Connect was produced as part of a one-act play showcase by Toy Boat Productions in Portland.

== Radio ==
From late 2007 to early 2008 Kleinman appeared weekly on KNRK with a segment called "Alternative Movie Picks," showcasing indie films in theaters and on DVD. In early 2008 he covered the Sundance Film Festival for the nationally syndicated Air America.

From March 2012 to August 2012, Kleinman appeared on KPAM and the Terry Boyd Show with a weekly radio segment called "The Drink Spirits Happy Hour".

== Major writing milestones ==
In 1995, Kleinman launched DVD Talk, which was then sold in 2007.

In 2009 Kleinman launched On Portland; covering arts, entertainment, food, drink and living in Portland, Oregon

In 2010 Kleinman launched Drink Spirits.com a guide to distilled spirits, whiskey, bourbon, micro distilleries and cocktails.

In 2011, Kleinman began freelance writing for Tasting Panel Magazine, and debuted with the piece "Pisco, Take Too" in the June 2011 Issue. In 2012 he was named a contributing editor to the magazine. He left the magazine in early 2013.

In 2012 Kleinman contributed to Playboy in the July/August Double Issue with the story "Best Bars in America 2012" and "Rum Diaries".

In 2014 Kleinman joined Whisky Advocate Magazine as a contributing editor.
