= Elly Kleinman =

- Born: Elly Kleinman; 1952 (age 73–74)
- Occupations: President and CEO; Americare Companies
- Years active: 1982 – present

Elly Kleinman (born 1952) is an American business executive and philanthropist best known as the founder and chief executive officer of the Americare Companies. He is the co-chairman of the Ohel Board of Directors, Chairman of Camp Kaylie Board of Trustees, and a former trustee of Maimonides Medical Center. In 2012 he was the chairman of 12th Siyum HaShas.

== Early life and education ==
Kleinman was born in 1952 to Ethel and Reb Avrohom Isaac Kleinman. Both of them were survivors of the Holocaust. His parents left Europe for America in 1949. In 1955 they settled in Borough Park where his father accepted a position at B'nai Israel of Linden Heights. Kleinman pursued his education at Brooklyn College. After graduating with a bachelor's degree in psychology, he started working and has since built a successful career in the healthcare industry.

== Americare Companies ==
Kleinman founded The Americare Companies in 1982. It is a New York-based company providing a wide range of healthcare services, including home healthcare and rehabilitation services, international nurse recruitment encompassing professional, paraprofessional and ancillary support services, and national operations for long term care pharmacy , ABA , and diagnostic testing. Kleinman has led the Americare Companies since its establishment, and still oversees all aspects of management and strategy for all divisions.

== Amud Aish Memorial Museum ==
Kleinman is the founder and president of Amud Aish Memorial Museum/Kleinman Holocaust Education Center, an organization and museum which serves as a memorial to The Holocaust. The center was established to document the history of the Holocaust, with the purpose of perpetuating the legacy of those who remained loyal to Jewish faith and practice after the Holocaust, and worked to rebuild Torah Judaism in the United States and throughout the world

== Community affiliations ==
Kleinman is the co-chairman of Ohel's board of directors. In 2009, Kleinman funded the opening of the Kleinman Family Ohel Regional Family Center in Far Rockaway. As a token of appreciation, Kleinman was honored at Ohel's inaugural legislative breakfast. He is also chairman of the Board of Trustees of Camp Kaylie.

Kleinman is a private donor for the Auschwitz-Birkenau Foundation.

He was one of the six first donors of "18 Pillars of Remembrance" supporting the Auschwitz- Birkenau Foundation and donated one million Euros for the cause. On January 27, 2015, Kleinman and other philanthropists were recognized at the 70th anniversary ceremonies of the liberation of the Nazi German concentration and extermination camps.

Kleinman also serves on the boards of directors of:

- Agudath Israel of America
- Beth Medrash Govoha, where he serves as co-chairman of the Board of Governors
- Rofeh Cholim Cancer Society (RCCS) He was the initial donor for funding the new division of RCCS in Israel, in memory of his father.
- Shuvu, an Israeli organization with a network of schools, assisting immigrant Russian children and their families acclimatize in Israel.

== Religious involvement ==
Kleinman is a member of the Orthodox Jewish community. He is a supporter of the Torah and chesed institutions in America, and around the world. Kleinman served as the chairman of the Twelfth Siyum Hashas of Daf Hayomi. The ceremony, which took place at the MetLife stadium in East Rutherford, N.J. in 2012, is considered as the largest such gathering in history with over 92,000 people present for the event. Although unity was the main theme of the evening, revival of Orthodoxy after the Holocaust and dedication to Torah study were also stressed. The event was an opportunity to showcase the strength of so-called Torah Judaism and its resurgence in America following the Holocaust.
