= Rofeh Cholim Cancer Society =

American organization

The Rofeh Cholim Cancer Society (RCCS) is an American-based organization dedicated towards helping cancer patients receive the best medical care available. It was founded in Brooklyn, New York in 1997 by businessman Rabbi Hershel Kohn.

The Society exists through a network of fund-raising activities. It also organizes assemblies where orthodox Jews gather to pray on behalf of the sick.
