= 2025 Carolina League season =

- League: Carolina League
- Sport: Baseball
- Duration: April 4 – September 7
- Games: 132
- Teams: 12

Regular season
- Season MVP: Caleb Bonemer, Kannapolis Cannon Ballers

Playoffs
- League champions: Lynchburg Hillcats
- Runners-up: Columbia Fireflies

CL seasons
- ← 2024 2026 →

The 2025 Carolina League season was a Single-A baseball season played between April 4 and September 7. Twelve teams played a 132-game schedule, with two teams in each division qualifying for the post-season.

The Lynchburg Hillcats won the Carolina League championship, defeating the Columbia Fireflies in the final round of the playoffs.

== Team changes ==
- The Down East Wood Ducks relocated to Spartanburg, South Carolina and are renamed the Hub City Spartanburgers. The club moved to the South Atlantic League.
- The Hickory Crawdads joined the Carolina League from the South Atlantic League. The club is affiliated with the Texas Rangers and will play in the South Division.
- The Fayetteville Woodpeckers switched from the South Division to the North Division.

== Teams ==
2025 Carolina League
Division	Team	City	MLB Affiliate	Stadium
North	Carolina Mudcats	Zebulon, North Carolina	Milwaukee Brewers	Five County Stadium
North	Delmarva Shorebirds	Salisbury, Maryland	Baltimore Orioles	Arthur W. Perdue Stadium
North	Fayetteville Woodpeckers	Fayetteville, North Carolina	Houston Astros	Segra Stadium
North	Fredericksburg Nationals	Fredericksburg, Virginia	Washington Nationals	Virginia Credit Union Stadium
North	Lynchburg Hillcats	Lynchburg, Virginia	Cleveland Guardians	Bank of the James Stadium
North	Salem Red Sox	Salem, Virginia	Boston Red Sox	Carilion Clinic Field
South	Augusta GreenJackets	North Augusta, South Carolina	Atlanta Braves	SRP Park
South	Charleston RiverDogs	Charleston, South Carolina	Tampa Bay Rays	Joseph P. Riley Jr. Park
South	Columbia Fireflies	Columbia, South Carolina	Kansas City Royals	Segra Park
South	Hickory Crawdads	Hickory, North Carolina	Texas Rangers	L. P. Frans Stadium
South	Kannapolis Cannon Ballers	Kannapolis, North Carolina	Chicago White Sox	Atrium Health Ballpark
South	Myrtle Beach Pelicans	Myrtle Beach, South Carolina	Chicago Cubs	Pelicans Ballpark

== Map of teams ==
North division South division

== Regular season ==
=== Summary ===
- The Lynchburg Hillcats finished with the best record in the league for the first time since 2017.

=== Overall standings ===
Final standings

North division
Team	Win	Loss	%	GB
Lynchburg Hillcats	70	59	.543	–
Carolina Mudcats	68	60	.531	1.5
Fayetteville Woodpeckers	69	63	.523	2.5
Fredericksburg Nationals	65	64	.504	5
Salem Red Sox	56	74	.431	14.5
Delmarva Shorebirds	51	79	.392	19.5
South division
Myrtle Beach Pelicans	68	60	.531	–
Charleston RiverDogs	68	62	.523	1
Hickory Crawdads	68	62	.523	1
Augusta GreenJackets	67	62	.519	1.5
Columbia Fireflies	64	65	.496	4.5
Kannapolis Cannon Ballers	64	68	.485	6

=== First half standings ===
Final first half standings

North division
Team	Win	Loss	%	GB
Lynchburg Hillcats	41	25	.621	–
Carolina Mudcats	36	28	.563	4
Fayetteville Woodpeckers	36	30	.545	5
Fredericksburg Nationals	30	35	.462	10.5
Delmarva Shorebirds	27	39	.409	14
Salem Red Sox	26	38	.406	14
South division
Columbia Fireflies	36	30	.545	–
Augusta GreenJackets	34	30	.531	1
Charleston RiverDogs	35	31	.530	1
Hickory Crawdads	33	32	.508	2.5
Kannapolis Cannon Ballers	32	34	.485	4
Myrtle Beach Pelicans	25	39	.391	10

=== Second half standings ===
Final second half standings

North division
Team	Win	Loss	%	GB
Fredericksburg Nationals	35	29	.547	–
Fayetteville Woodpeckers	33	33	.500	3
Carolina Mudcats	32	32	.500	3
Lynchburg Hillcats	29	34	.460	6
Salem Red Sox	30	36	.455	6
Delmarva Shorebirds	24	40	.375	11
South division
Myrtle Beach Pelicans	43	21	.672	–
Hickory Crawdads	35	30	.538	8.5
Charleston RiverDogs	33	31	.516	10
Augusta GreenJackets	33	32	.508	10.5
Kannapolis Cannon Ballers	32	34	.485	12
Columbia Fireflies	28	35	.444	14.5

== League leaders ==
=== Batting leaders ===
Stat	Player	Total
AVG	Justin Gonzales, Salem Red Sox	.298
H	Owen Carey, Augusta GreenJackets	121
R	Narciso Polanco, Charleston RiverDogs	84
2B	Caleb Bonemer, Kannapolis Cannon Ballers	26
3B	Starlyn Nunez, Salem Red Sox; Cristhian Vaquero, Fredericksburg Nationals	8
HR	Eric Bitoni, Carolina Mudcats	19
RBI	Eric Bitoni, Carolina Mudcats	77
SB	Asbel Gonzalez, Columbia Fireflies	78

=== Pitching leaders ===
Stat	Player	Total
W	Ryan Andrade, Charleston RiverDogs	11
ERA	Melvin Hernandez, Carolina Mudcats	2.00
CG	Rayven Antonio, Augusta GreenJackets; Cam Caminiti, Augusta GreenJackets; Ethan Flanagan, Myrtle Beach Pelicans; Melvin Hernandez, Carolina Mudcats; Yoel Tejada, Fredericksburg Nationals	1
SHO	Rayven Antonio, Augusta GreenJackets; Ethan Flanagan, Myrtle Beach Pelicans	1
SV	Robert Cranz, Fredericksburg Nationals	9
SO	Melkis Hernandez, Lynchburg Hillcats	116
IP	Melvin Hernandez, Carolina Mudcats	121.2

== Playoffs ==
- The Lynchburg Hillcats won their ninth Carolina League championship, defeating the Columbia Fireflies in three games.

=== Playoff bracket ===
Semi-finals
N1	Lynchburg	2
N2	Fredericksburg	0
S1	Columbia	2
S2	Myrtle Beach	0

Finals
N1	Lynchburg	2
S1	Columbia	1

=== Semi-finals ===
==== (N1) Lynchburg Hillcats vs. (N2) Fredericksburg Nationals ====
Lynchburg won the series, 2–0.

Game	Date	Score	Location	Time	Attendance
1	September 9	Lynchburg Hillcats – 2, Fredericksburg Nationals – 1	Virginia Credit Union Stadium	2:40	1,963
2	September 11	Frederickburg Nationals – 4, Lynchburg Hillcats – 5	Bank of the James Stadium	2:47	1,642

==== (S1) Columbia Fireflies vs. (S2) Myrtle Beach Pelicans ====
Columbia won the series, 2–0.

Game	Date	Score	Location	Time	Attendance
1	September 9	Columbia Fireflies – 4, Myrtle Beach Pelicans – 1	Pelicans Ballpark	2:38	4,843
2	September 11	Myrtle Beach Pelicans – 1, Columbia Fireflies – 2	Segra Park	2:16	3,762

=== Finals ===
==== (S1) Columbia Fireflies vs. (N1) Lynchburg Hillcats ====
Lynchburg won the series, 2–1.

Game	Date	Score	Location	Time	Attendance
1	September 14	Columbia Fireflies – 5, Lynchburg Hillcats – 6	Bank of the James Stadium	3:11	1,510
2	September 16	Lynchburg Hillcats – 10, Columbia Fireflies – 15	Segra Park	3:11	4,012
3	September 17	Lynchburg Hillcats – 8, Columbia Fireflies – 2	Segra Park	2:56	2,838

== Awards ==
Carolina League awards
Award name	Recipient
Most Valuable Player	Caleb Bonemer, Kannapolis Cannon Ballers
Pitcher of the Year	David Shields, Columbia Fireflies
Top MLB Prospect	Jesús Made, Carolina Mudcats
Manager of the Year	Jordan Smith, Lynchburg Hillcats

== See also ==
- 2025 Major League Baseball season
