= 2021 Low-A East season =

- League: Low-A East
- Sport: Baseball
- Duration: May 4 – September 19
- Number of games: 120
- Number of teams: 12

Regular season
- Season MVP: Diego Infante, Charleston RiverDogs

Playoffs
- League champions: Charleston RiverDogs
- Runners-up: Down East Wood Ducks

CL seasons
- ← 2020 2022 →

The 2021 Low-A East was a Class A baseball season played between May 4 and September 19. Twelve teams played a 120-game schedule, with the top two teams meeting in the final round of the post-season.

The Charleston RiverDogs won the Low-A East championship, defeating the Down East Wood Ducks in the final round.

== League changes ==
- As part of Major League Baseball's reorganization of the minor leagues, the Carolina League was demoted to Class A and renamed the "Low-A East".
- The league expanded to 12 teams and a third division, the Central, was added.

== Team changes ==
- The Frederick Keys were demoted out of professional baseball.
- The Wilmington Blue Rocks were shifted to the South Atlantic League.
- The Winston-Salem Dash were shifted to the South Atlantic League.
- The Delmarva Shorebirds joined the league from the South Atlantic League and are affiliated with the Baltimore Orioles. The Shorebirds join the North Division.
- The Kannapolis Cannon Ballers joined the league from the South Atlantic League and are affiliated with the Chicago White Sox. The Cannon Ballers join the Central Division.
- The Augusta GreenJackets joined the league from the South Atlantic League and are affiliated with the Atlanta Braves. The GreenJackets join the South Division.
- The Charleston RiverDogs joined the league from the South Atlantic League and are affiliated with the Tampa Bay Rays. The RiverDogs join the South Division.
- The Columbia Fireflies joined the league from the South Atlantic League and are affiliated with the Kansas City Royals. The Fireflies join the South Division.

== Teams ==
2021 Low-A East
Division	Team	City	MLB Affiliate	Stadium
North	Delmarva Shorebirds	Salisbury, Maryland	Baltimore Orioles	Arthur W. Perdue Stadium
North	Fredericksburg Nationals	Fredericksburg, Virginia	Washington Nationals	FredNats Ballpark
North	Lynchburg Hillcats	Lynchburg, Virginia	Cleveland Indians	Bank of the James Stadium
North	Salem Red Sox	Salem, Virginia	Boston Red Sox	Haley Toyota Field
Central	Carolina Mudcats	Zebulon, North Carolina	Milwaukee Brewers	Five County Stadium
Central	Down East Wood Ducks	Kinston, North Carolina	Texas Rangers	Grainger Stadium
Central	Fayetteville Woodpeckers	Fayetteville, North Carolina	Houston Astros	Segra Stadium
Central	Kannapolis Cannon Ballers	Kannapolis, North Carolina	Chicago White Sox	Atrium Health Ballpark
South	Augusta GreenJackets	North Augusta, South Carolina	Atlanta Braves	SRP Park
South	Charleston RiverDogs	Charleston, South Carolina	Tampa Bay Rays	Joseph P. Riley Jr. Park
South	Columbia Fireflies	Columbia, South Carolina	Kansas City Royals	Segra Park
South	Myrtle Beach Pelicans	Myrtle Beach, South Carolina	Chicago Cubs	TicketReturn.com Field

== Map of teams ==
North division Central division South division

== Regular season ==
=== Summary ===
- The Charleston RiverDogs finished with the best record in the league for the first time in team history.

=== Standings ===
North division
Team	Win	Loss	%	GB
Salem Red Sox	71	49	.592	–
Delmarva Shorebirds	68	52	.567	3
Lynchburg Hillcats	58	62	.483	10
Fredericksburg Nationals	44	76	.367	24
Central division
Down East Wood Ducks	72	48	.600	–
Carolina Mudcats	68	52	.567	4
Fayetteville Woodpeckers	55	65	.458	17
Kannapolis Cannon Ballers	40	79	.336	31.5
South division
Charleston RiverDogs	82	38	.683	–
Myrtle Beach Pelicans	59	61	.492	23
Augusta GreenJackets	54	66	.450	28
Columbia Fireflies	48	71	.403	33.5

== League Leaders ==
=== Batting leaders ===
Stat	Player	Total
AVG	Nick Yorke, Salem Red Sox	.323
H	Gilberto Jiménez, Salem Red Sox	114
R	Diego Infante, Charleston RiverDogs	83
2B	Nicholas Northcut, Salem Red Sox	32
3B	Ceddanne Rafaela, Salem Red Sox	9
HR	Nicholas Northcut, Salem Red Sox	17
RBI	Diego Infante, Charleston RiverDogs	80
SB	Jayce Easley, Down East Wood Ducks	70

=== Pitching leaders ===
Stat	Player	Total
W	Taj Bradley, Charleston RiverDogs; Jordan DiValerio, Salem Red Sox	9
ERA	Taj Bradley, Charleston RiverDogs	1.76
SV	Devon Roedahl, Salem Red Sox	11
SO	Joey Estes, Augusta GreenJackets	127
IP	Nick Krauth, Down East Wood Ducks	102.2

== Playoffs ==
- The Charleston RiverDogs won their first Low-A East championship, defeating the Down East Wood Ducks in five games.

=== Playoff bracket ===
Finals
1	Charleston	3
2	Down East	2

== Awards ==
Low-A East League awards
Award name	Recipient
Most Valuable Player	Diego Infante, Charleston RiverDogs
Pitcher of the Year	Joey Estes, Augusta GreenJackets
Manager of the Year	Blake Butera, Charleston RiverDogs

== See also ==
- 2021 Major League Baseball season
