= 2026 Carolina League season =

- League: Carolina League
- Sport: Baseball
- Duration: April 2 – September 6
- Games: 132
- Teams: 12

Regular season
- Season MVP: Cooper Flemming, Charleston RiverDogs

Playoffs
- League champions: Fayetteville Woodpeckers
- Runners-up: Charleston RiverDogs

CL seasons
- ← 2025 2027 →

The 2026 Carolina League season was a Single-A baseball season being played between April 2 and September 6. Twelve teams played a 132-game schedule, with two teams in each division qualifying for the post-season.

The Fayetteville Woodpeckers won the Carolina League championship, defeating the Charleston RiverDogs in the final round of the playoffs.

== Team changes ==
- The Carolina Mudcats relocated to Wilson, North Carolina and were renamed to the Wilson Warbirds. The club remained as an affiliate for the Milwaukee Brewers.
- The Lynchburg Hillcats were rebranded to the Hill City Howlers. The club remained as an affiliate for the Cleveland Guardians.
- The Salem Red Sox were rebranded to the Salem RidgeYaks. The club remained as an affiliate for the Boston Red Sox.

== Teams ==
2026 Carolina League
Division	Team	City	MLB Affiliate	Stadium
North	Delmarva Shorebirds	Salisbury, Maryland	Baltimore Orioles	Arthur W. Perdue Stadium
North	Fayetteville Woodpeckers	Fayetteville, North Carolina	Houston Astros	Segra Stadium
North	Fredericksburg Nationals	Fredericksburg, Virginia	Washington Nationals	Virginia Credit Union Stadium
North	Hill City Howlers	Lynchburg, Virginia	Cleveland Guardians	City Stadium
North	Salem RidgeYaks	Salem, Virginia	Boston Red Sox	Carilion Clinic Field at Salem Memorial Ballpark
North	Wilson Warbirds	Wilson, North Carolina	Milwaukee Brewers	Wilson Ballpark
South	Augusta GreenJackets	North Augusta, South Carolina	Atlanta Braves	SRP Park
South	Charleston RiverDogs	Charleston, South Carolina	Tampa Bay Rays	Joseph P. Riley Jr. Park
South	Columbia Fireflies	Columbia, South Carolina	Kansas City Royals	Segra Park
South	Hickory Crawdads	Hickory, North Carolina	Texas Rangers	L. P. Frans Stadium
South	Kannapolis Cannon Ballers	Kannapolis, North Carolina	Chicago White Sox	Atrium Health Ballpark
South	Myrtle Beach Pelicans	Myrtle Beach, South Carolina	Chicago Cubs	Pelicans Ballpark

== Map of teams ==
North division South division

== Regular season ==
- The Hickory Crawdads finished the season with the best record in the league for the first time in club history.

=== Overall standings ===
Final standings

North division
Team	Win	Loss	%	GB
Fredericksburg Nationals	80	51	.611	–
Fayetteville Woodpeckers	71	58	.550	8
Wilson Warbirds	64	66	.492	15.5
Salem RidgeYaks	56	75	.427	24
Hill City Howlers	56	75	.427	24
Delmarva Shorebirds	45	87	.341	35.5
South division
Team	Win	Loss	%	GB
Hickory Crawdads	82	47	.636	–
Charleston RiverDogs	73	59	.553	11.5
Kannapolis Cannon Ballers	71	61	.538	12.5
Augusta GreenJackets	70	61	.534	13
Columbia Fireflies	64	65	.496	18
Myrtle Beach Pelicans	50	77	.394	31

=== First half standings ===
Final first half standings

North division
Team	Win	Loss	%	GB
Fredericksburg Nationals	46	20	.697	–
Wilson Warbirds	36	30	.545	10
Fayetteville Woodpeckers	32	33	.492	13.5
Hill City Howlers	31	35	.470	15
Salem RidgeYaks	25	40	.385	20.5
Delmarva Shorebirds	23	43	.348	23
South division
Team	Win	Loss	%	GB
Charleston RiverDogs	37	29	.561	–
Hickory Crawdads	34	30	.531	2
Augusta GreenJackets	35	31	.530	2
Columbia Fireflies	34	32	.515	3
Kannapolis Cannon Ballers	33	33	.500	4
Myrtle Beach Pelicans	27	37	.422	9

=== Second half standings ===
Final second half standings

North division
Team	Win	Loss	%	GB
Fayetteville Woodpeckers	39	25	.609	–
Fredericksburg Nationals	34	31	.523	5.5
Salem RidgeYaks	31	35	.470	9
Wilson Warbirds	28	36	.438	11
Hill City Howlers	25	40	.385	14.5
Delmarva Shorebirds	22	44	.333	18
South division
Team	Win	Loss	%	GB
Hickory Crawdads	48	17	.738	–
Kannapolis Cannon Ballers	38	28	.576	10.5
Charleston RiverDogs	36	30	.545	12.5
Augusta GreenJackets	35	30	.538	13
Columbia Fireflies	30	33	.476	17
Myrtle Beach Pelicans	23	40	.365	24

== League leaders ==
=== Batting leaders ===
Stat	Player	Total
AVG	Luis Guanipa, Augusta GreenJackets	.303
H	Cooper Flemming, Charleston RiverDogs	133
R	Paulino Santana, Hickory Crawdads	89
2B	Cooper Flemming, Charleston RiverDogs	29
3B	Jaden Fauske, Kannapolis Cannon Ballers	10
HR	Jose Anderson, Wilson Warbirds	23
RBI	Cooper Flemming, Charleston RiverDogs	79
SB	Yolfran Castillo, Hickory Crawdads	55

=== Pitching leaders ===
Stat	Player	Total
W	Moises Morales, Hickory Crawdads	10
ERA	Evan Siary, Hickory Crawdads	3.30
CG	Aidan Cremarosa, Charleston RiverDogs; Juan Fraide, Fayetteville Woodpeckers; Jason Gilman, Salem RidgeYaks; Aidan Haugh, Charleston RiverDogs; Andrew Herbert, Delmarva Shorebirds; Truman Pauley, Kannapolis Cannon Ballers; Javier Pérez, Fayetteville Woodpeckers	1
SHO	Aidan Cremarosa, Charleston RiverDogs; Juan Fraide, Fayetteville Woodpeckers; Aidan Haugh, Charleston RiverDogs	1
SV	Andy Basora, Columbia Fireflies; Louis Marinaro, Hickory Crawdads; Styven Paez, Augusta GreenJackets; Landen Payne, Kannapolis Cannon Ballers; Lewis Sifontes, Augusta GreenJackets	8
SO	Michael Lombardi, Columbia Fireflies	124
IP	Aidan Haugh, Charleston RiverDogs	118.1

== Playoffs ==
- The Fayetteville Woodpeckers won their second league title in franchise history, and first since relocating to Fayetteville, as they defeated the Charleston RiverDogs in two games.

=== Playoff bracket ===
Semi-finals
N1	Fredericksburg	0
N2	Fayetteville	2
S1	Charleston	2
S2	Hickory	1

Finals
N2	Fayetteville	2
S1	Charleston	0

=== Semi-finals ===
==== (N1) Fredericksburg Nationals vs. (N2) Fayetteville Woodpeckers ====
Fayetteville won the series, 2–0.

Game	Date	Score	Location	Time	Attendance
1	September 8	Fredericksburg – 2, Fayetteville – 4	Segra Stadium	2:20	3,033
2	September 10	Fayetteville – 8, Fredericksburg – 1	Virginia Credit Union Stadium	2:35	3,201

==== (S1) Charleston RiverDogs vs. (S2) Hickory Crawdads ====
Charleston won the series, 2–1.

Game	Date	Score	Location	Time	Attendance
1	September 8	Charleston – 9, Hickory – 8 10 inn.	L. P. Frans Stadium	3:01	2,017
2	September 10	Hickory – 4, Charleston – 3	Joseph P. Riley Jr. Park	2:42	4,727
3	September 11	Hickory – 6, Charleston – 7	Joseph P. Riley Jr. Park	2:54	3,154

=== Finals ===
==== (S1) Charleston RiverDogs vs. (N2) Fayetteville Woodpeckers ====
Fayetteville won the series, 2–0.

Game	Date	Score	Location	Time	Attendance
1	September 13	Fayetteville – 14, Charleston – 4	Joseph P. Riley Jr. Park	3:03	3,327
2	September 15	Charleston – 4, Fayetteville – 7	Segra Stadium	2:51	4,102

== Awards ==
Carolina League awards
Award name	Recipient
Most Valuable Player	Cooper Flemming, Charleston RiverDogs
Pitcher of the Year	Aidan Cremarosa, Charleston RiverDogs
Top MLB Prospect	Brady Ebel, Wilson Warbirds
Manager of the Year	Nick Janssen, Hickory Crawdads

== See also ==
- 2026 Major League Baseball season
