= 2022 Carolina League season =

- League: Carolina League
- Sport: Baseball
- Duration: April 8 – September 11
- Number of games: 132
- Number of teams: 12

Regular season
- Season MVP: Jackson Chourio, Carolina Mudcats

Playoffs
- League champions: Charleston RiverDogs
- Runners-up: Lynchburg Hillcats

CL seasons
- ← 2021 2023 →

The 2022 Carolina League season was a Single-A baseball season played between April 8 and September 11. Twelve teams played a 132-game schedule, with two teams in each division qualifying for the post-season.

The Charleston RiverDogs won the Carolina League championship, defeating the Lynchburg Hillcats in the final round.

== League changes ==
- Following MLB's acquisition of the rights to the names of the historical minor leagues, the Carolina League name was restored effective with the 2022 season.
- The league realigned back to two divisions, the North Division and the South Division.

== Teams ==
2022 Carolina League
Division	Team	City	MLB Affiliate	Stadium
North	Carolina Mudcats	Zebulon, North Carolina	Milwaukee Brewers	Five County Stadium
North	Delmarva Shorebirds	Salisbury, Maryland	Baltimore Orioles	Arthur W. Perdue Stadium
North	Down East Wood Ducks	Kinston, North Carolina	Texas Rangers	Grainger Stadium
North	Fredericksburg Nationals	Fredericksburg, Virginia	Washington Nationals	Virginia Credit Union Stadium
North	Lynchburg Hillcats	Lynchburg, Virginia	Cleveland Guardians	Bank of the James Stadium
North	Salem Red Sox	Salem, Virginia	Boston Red Sox	Carilion Clinic Field
South	Augusta GreenJackets	North Augusta, South Carolina	Atlanta Braves	SRP Park
South	Charleston RiverDogs	Charleston, South Carolina	Tampa Bay Rays	Joseph P. Riley Jr. Park
South	Columbia Fireflies	Columbia, South Carolina	Kansas City Royals	Segra Park
South	Fayetteville Woodpeckers	Fayetteville, North Carolina	Houston Astros	Segra Stadium
South	Kannapolis Cannon Ballers	Kannapolis, North Carolina	Chicago White Sox	Atrium Health Ballpark
South	Myrtle Beach Pelicans	Myrtle Beach, South Carolina	Chicago Cubs	TicketReturn.com Field

== Map of teams ==
North division South division

== Regular season ==
=== Summary ===
- The Charleston RiverDogs finished with the best record in the league for the second consecutive season.

=== Standings ===
North division
Team	Win	Loss	%	GB
Fredericksburg Nationals	75	55	.577	–
Carolina Mudcats	69	62	.527	6.5
Down East Wood Ducks	65	66	.496	10.5
Salem Red Sox	64	66	.492	11
Lynchburg Hillcats	63	68	.481	12.5
Delmarva Shorebirds	49	81	.377	26
South division
Charleston RiverDogs	88	44	.667	–
Myrtle Beach Pelicans	78	53	.595	9.5
Augusta GreenJackets	69	62	.527	18.5
Kannapolis Cannon Ballers	58	74	.439	30
Fayetteville Woodpeckers	55	75	.423	32
Columbia Fireflies	52	79	.397	35.5

== League Leaders ==
=== Batting leaders ===
Stat	Player	Total
AVG	Jackson Chourio, Carolina Mudcats	.324
H	James Triantos, Myrtle Beach Pelicans	124
R	Jacob Young, Fredericksburg Nationals	118
2B	Eddinson Paulino, Salem Red Sox	35
3B	Eddinson Paulino, Salem Red Sox; Carson Williams, Charleston RiverDogs	9
HR	Carson Williams, Charleston RiverDogs	19
RBI	Kevin Alcántara, Myrtle Beach Pelicans	85
SB	Luis Valdez, Delmarva Shorebirds	59

=== Pitching leaders ===
Stat	Player	Total
W	Over Galue, Charleston RiverDogs	12
ERA	Will Dion, Lynchburg Hillcats	2.26
SV	Luis Barroso, Columbia Fireflies; Rob Griswold, Augusta GreenJackets; Jack Snyder, Charleston RiverDogs; Riggs Threadgill, Fredericksburg Nationals	9
SO	Will Dion, Lynchburg Hillcats	142
IP	Bryan Caceres, Fredericksburg Nationals	117.0

== Playoffs ==
- The Charleston RiverDogs won their second Carolina League championship, defeating the Lynchburg Hillcats in two games.

=== Playoff bracket ===
Semi-finals
N1	Fredericksburg	1
N2	Lynchburg	2
S1	Charleston	2
S2	Myrtle Beach	0

Finals
N2	Lynchburg	0
S1	Charleston	2

== Awards ==
Carolina League awards
Award name	Recipient
Most Valuable Player	Jackson Chourio, Carolina Mudcats
Pitcher of the Year	Will Dion, Lynchburg Hillcats
Manager of the Year	Blake Butera, Charleston RiverDogs

== See also ==
- 2022 Major League Baseball season
