= 2023 Carolina League season =

- League: Carolina League
- Sport: Baseball
- Duration: April 6 – September 10
- Number of games: 132
- Number of teams: 12

Regular season
- Season MVP: Samuel Basallo, Delmarva Shorebirds

Playoffs
- League champions: Charleston RiverDogs
- Runners-up: Down East Wood Ducks

CL seasons
- ← 2022 2024 →

The 2023 Carolina League season was a Single-A baseball season played between April 6 and September 10. Twelve teams played a 132-game schedule, with two teams in each division qualifying for the post-season.

The Charleston RiverDogs won the Carolina League championship, defeating the Down East Wood Ducks in the final round.

== Teams ==
2023 Carolina League
Division	Team	City	MLB Affiliate	Stadium
North	Carolina Mudcats	Zebulon, North Carolina	Milwaukee Brewers	Five County Stadium
North	Delmarva Shorebirds	Salisbury, Maryland	Baltimore Orioles	Arthur W. Perdue Stadium
North	Down East Wood Ducks	Kinston, North Carolina	Texas Rangers	Grainger Stadium
North	Fredericksburg Nationals	Fredericksburg, Virginia	Washington Nationals	Virginia Credit Union Stadium
North	Lynchburg Hillcats	Lynchburg, Virginia	Cleveland Guardians	Bank of the James Stadium
North	Salem Red Sox	Salem, Virginia	Boston Red Sox	Carilion Clinic Field
South	Augusta GreenJackets	North Augusta, South Carolina	Atlanta Braves	SRP Park
South	Charleston RiverDogs	Charleston, South Carolina	Tampa Bay Rays	Joseph P. Riley Jr. Park
South	Columbia Fireflies	Columbia, South Carolina	Kansas City Royals	Segra Park
South	Fayetteville Woodpeckers	Fayetteville, North Carolina	Houston Astros	Segra Stadium
South	Kannapolis Cannon Ballers	Kannapolis, North Carolina	Chicago White Sox	Atrium Health Ballpark
South	Myrtle Beach Pelicans	Myrtle Beach, South Carolina	Chicago Cubs	Pelicans Ballpark

== Map of teams ==
North division South division

== Regular season ==
=== Summary ===
- The Myrtle Beach Pelicans finished with the best record in the league for the first time since 2015.

=== Standings ===
North division
Team	Win	Loss	%	GB
Carolina Mudcats	72	55	.567	–
Down East Wood Ducks	66	61	.520	6
Lynchburg Hillcats	67	64	.511	7
Fredericksburg Nationals	65	63	.508	7.5
Salem Red Sox	55	72	.433	17
Delmarva Shorebirds	56	74	.431	17.5
South division
Myrtle Beach Pelicans	75	55	.577	–
Kannapolis Cannon Ballers	67	64	.511	8.5
Charleston RiverDogs	66	65	.504	9.5
Columbia Fireflies	66	65	.504	9.5
Augusta GreenJackets	63	68	.481	12.5
Fayetteville Woodpeckers	60	72	.455	16

== League Leaders ==
=== Batting leaders ===
Stat	Player	Total
AVG	Justin Janas, Augusta GreenJackets	.310
H	Cooper Kinney, Charleston RiverDogs	125
R	Reivag García, Myrtle Beach Pelicans	72
2B	Jadher Areinamo, Carolina Mudcats	26
3B	Wuilfredo Antunez, Lynchburg Hillcats; Zac Fascia, Lynchburg Hillcats; Daylen Lile, Fredericksburg Nationals	7
HR	Tim Elko, Kannapolis Cannon Ballers	17
RBI	Brett Squires, Columbia Fireflies	69
SB	Chandler Simpson, Charleston RiverDogs	81

=== Pitching leaders ===
Stat	Player	Total
W	Zach Jacobs, Lynchburg Hillcats; Trevor Martin, Charleston RiverDogs; Manuel Veloz, Kannapolis Cannon Ballers	10
ERA	Aidan Curry, Down East Wood Ducks	2.30
SV	Billy Seidl, Kannapolis Cannon Ballers	14
SO	Trey Dombrowski, Fayetteville Woodpeckers	148
IP	Marcus Johnson, Charleston RiverDogs	130.0

== Playoffs ==
- The Charleston RiverDogs won their third consecutive Carolina League championship, defeating the Down East Wood Ducks in two games.

=== Playoff bracket ===
Semi-finals
N1	Carolina	1
N2	Down East	2
S1	Myrtle Beach	1
S2	Charleston	2

Finals
N2	Down East	0
S2	Charleston	2

== Awards ==
Carolina League awards
Award name	Recipient
Most Valuable Player	Samuel Basallo, Delmarva Shorebirds
Pitcher of the Year	Aidan Curry, Down East Wood Ducks
Manager of the Year	Victor Estevez, Carolina Mudcats

== See also ==
- 2023 Major League Baseball season
