= 2024 Carolina League season =

- League: Carolina League
- Sport: Baseball
- Duration: April 5 – September 8
- Games: 132
- Teams: 12

Regular season
- Season MVP: Jaison Chourio, Lynchburg Hillcats

Playoffs
- League champions: Fredericksburg Nationals
- Runners-up: Kannapolis Cannon Ballers

CL seasons
- ← 2023 2025 →

The 2024 Carolina League season was a Single-A baseball season played between April 5 and September 8. Twelve teams played a 132-game schedule, with two teams in each division qualifying for the post-season.

The Fredericksburg Nationals won the Carolina League championship, defeating the Kannapolis Cannon Ballers in the final round.

== Teams ==
2024 Carolina League
Division	Team	City	MLB Affiliate	Stadium
North	Carolina Mudcats	Zebulon, North Carolina	Milwaukee Brewers	Five County Stadium
North	Delmarva Shorebirds	Salisbury, Maryland	Baltimore Orioles	Arthur W. Perdue Stadium
North	Down East Wood Ducks	Kinston, North Carolina	Texas Rangers	Grainger Stadium
North	Fredericksburg Nationals	Fredericksburg, Virginia	Washington Nationals	Virginia Credit Union Stadium
North	Lynchburg Hillcats	Lynchburg, Virginia	Cleveland Guardians	Bank of the James Stadium
North	Salem Red Sox	Salem, Virginia	Boston Red Sox	Carilion Clinic Field
South	Augusta GreenJackets	North Augusta, South Carolina	Atlanta Braves	SRP Park
South	Charleston RiverDogs	Charleston, South Carolina	Tampa Bay Rays	Joseph P. Riley Jr. Park
South	Columbia Fireflies	Columbia, South Carolina	Kansas City Royals	Segra Park
South	Fayetteville Woodpeckers	Fayetteville, North Carolina	Houston Astros	Segra Stadium
South	Kannapolis Cannon Ballers	Kannapolis, North Carolina	Chicago White Sox	Atrium Health Ballpark
South	Myrtle Beach Pelicans	Myrtle Beach, South Carolina	Chicago Cubs	Pelicans Ballpark

== Map of teams ==
North division South division

== Regular season ==
=== Summary ===
- The Carolina Mudcats finished with the best record in the league for the first time in team history.

=== Standings ===
==== Overall standings ====
North division
Team	Win	Loss	%	GB
Carolina Mudcats	78	51	.605	–
Fredericksburg Nationals	74	57	.565	5
Salem Red Sox	70	62	.530	9.5
Lynchburg Hillcats	67	61	.523	10.5
Down East Wood Ducks	65	63	.508	12.5
Delmarva Shorebirds	53	78	.405	26
South division
Kannapolis Cannon Ballers	70	61	.534	–
Charleston RiverDogs	69	61	.531	0.5
Columbia Fireflies	68	63	.519	2
Myrtle Beach Pelicans	62	67	.481	7
Fayetteville Woodpeckers	55	75	.423	14.5
Augusta GreenJackets	49	80	.380	20

==== First half standings ====
North division
Team	Win	Loss	%	GB
Carolina Mudcats	41	24	.631	–
Lynchburg Hillcats	37	29	.561	4.5
Down East Wood Ducks	35	30	.538	6
Fredericksburg Nationals	35	31	.530	6.5
Salem Red Sox	34	32	.515	7.5
Delmarva Shorebirds	23	42	.354	18
South division
Kannapolis Cannon Ballers	41	25	.621	–
Columbia Fireflies	35	30	.538	5.5
Fayetteville Woodpeckers	29	37	.439	12
Myrtle Beach Pelicans	29	37	.439	12
Augusta GreenJackets	27	38	.415	13.5
Charleston RiverDogs	27	38	.415	13.5

==== Second half standings ====
North division
Team	Win	Loss	%	GB
Fredericksburg Nationals	39	26	.600	–
Carolina Mudcats	37	27	.578	1.5
Salem Red Sox	36	30	.545	3.5
Down East Wood Ducks	30	33	.476	8
Lynchburg Hillcats	30	33	.476	8
Delmarva Shorebirds	30	36	.455	9.5
South division
Charleston RiverDogs	42	23	.646	–
Myrtle Beach Pelicans	33	30	.524	8
Columbia Fireflies	33	33	.500	9.5
Kannapolis Cannon Ballers	29	36	.446	13
Fayetteville Woodpeckers	26	38	.406	15.5
Augusta GreenJackets	22	42	.344	19.5

== League Leaders ==
=== Batting leaders ===
Stat	Player	Total
AVG	Caden Connor, Kannapolis Cannon Ballers	.307
H	Brandon Pimentel, Fredericksburg Nationals	115
R	Rikuu Nishida, Kannapolis Cannon Ballers	84
2B	Andy Lugo, Salem Red Sox	26
3B	Jacob Wetzel, Myrtle Beach Pelicans	11
HR	Andy Garriola, Myrtle Beach Pelicans; Blake Mitchell, Columbia Fireflies	18
RBI	Brandon Pimentel, Fredericksburg Nationals	85
SB	Yhoswar Garcia, Carolina Mudcats	65

=== Pitching leaders ===
Stat	Player	Total
W	Royman Blanco, Salem Red Sox	10
ERA	David Davalillo, Down East Wood Ducks	1.79
SV	Anthony Arguelles, Fredericksburg Nationals	11
SO	Travis Sykora, Fredericksburg Nationals	129
IP	Santiago Suárez, Charleston RiverDogs	111.2

== Playoffs ==
- The Fredericksburg Nationals won their fifth Carolina League championship, defeating the Kannapolis Cannon Ballers in three games.

=== Playoff bracket ===
Semi-finals
N1	Carolina	0
N2	Fredericksburg	2
S1	Kannapolis	2
S2	Charleston	1

Finals
N2	Fredericksburg	2
S1	Kannapolis	1

== Awards ==
Carolina League awards
Award name	Recipient
Most Valuable Player	Jaison Chourio, Lynchburg Hillcats
Pitcher of the Year	Travis Sykora, Fredericksburg Nationals
Manager of the Year	Nick Stanley, Carolina Mudcats

== See also ==
- 2024 Major League Baseball season
