= Sean Gamble =

American baseball player (born 2006)

Kansas City Royals
- Infielder / Outfielder
- Born: July 6, 2006 (age 20); Des Moines, Iowa, U.S.
- Bats: Left Throws: Right

Sean Gamble (born July 6, 2006) is an American professional baseball infielder and outfielder in the Kansas City Royals organization.

== Career ==
Gamble was born and raised in Des Moines, Iowa. At age 14, Gamble began attending IMG Academy in Bradenton, Florida. He committed to play college baseball at Vanderbilt University.

Gamble was selected by the Kansas City Royals in the first round with the 23rd overall selection of the 2025 Major League Baseball draft. Gamble signed with the Royals for a $4 million signing bonus on July 21, 2025.

Gamble was assigned to the Single-A Columbia Fireflies to open the 2026 season.
