= Great South League =

The Great South League is a collegiate summer baseball league which comprises teams located in the U.S. states of Georgia, Florida, Alabama, South Carolina, North Carolina, and Virginia. Teams consist of current college baseball players from the JUCO, NAIA, and NCAA levels who wish to further their skills by practicing and playing during the summer off-season.

== History of the Great South League ==
In the fall of 2005, the Georgia Collegiate League was founded by the Georgia Dugout Club in order to promote wood-bat summer league baseball within the state of Georgia. After two successful seasons of playing ball, the GCL formally adopted the new name, the Great South League, and expanded to include 12 teams in the states of Georgia, Florida, and Alabama for the 2008 season. Currently, the GSL has four divisions with 24 teams spread across the Southeast. The GSL seeks to allow college baseball players of all intercollegiate levels continue their development and improve their style of play. Bill Park Jr (aka Liam Parke) has served as the Leagues President since 2007 becoming Commissioner in 2010 upon the retirement of founding Commissioner, Harvey Cochran.

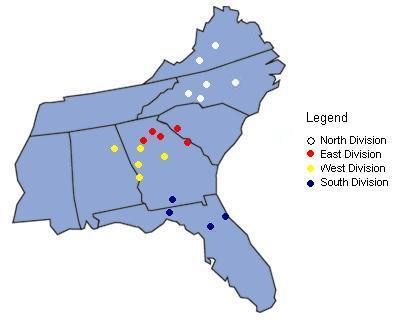
Map of current GSL franchises

== Past, present, and future teams of the GSL ==
=== Current teams of the GSL ===
At Large Division

Team name	Location	Joined GSL	Home field
Tennessee Styx	Chattanooga, TN	2010	Engel Stadium

North Division

Team name	Location	Joined GSL	Home field
Catawba Valley Stars	Hickory, North Carolina	2009	L.P. Frans Stadium (Hickory Crawdads) / Lenoir Rhyne College Field
Carolina Hurricanes	Charlotte, North Carolina	2009	TBA
Central Virginia	Lynchburg, Virginia	2009	TBA
Fuquay-Varina Twins	Fuquay-Varina, North Carolina	2009	Harnett Central High School Field
Kernersville Bulldogs	Kernersville, North Carolina	2009	Glenn High School Field
West Virginia Wild	Bluefield, West Virginia	2010	Bluefield State College
Roanoke Rails	Roanoke, Virginia	2009	TBA

East Division

Team name	Location	Joined GSL	Home field
Athens Pirates	Athens, Georgia	2006	Cedar Shoals High School
Augusta Nationals	Augusta, Georgia	2008	Jaguar Field (Augusta State University)
Ty Cobb Reds	Franklin Springs, Georgia	2010	Emmanuel College Field
GSA Macon Giants	Macon, Georgia	2006	Luther Williams Field
AWBIL Raiders	Atlanta, Georgia	2010	Mundy's Mill High School
AWBIL Royals	Atlanta, Georgia	2009, 2010	Mundy's Mill High School

- A Inaugural season delayed to 2010.
- B Played as a single team prior to 2009 season.

West Division

Team name	Location	Joined GSL	Home field
Cobb Premier Stars	Mableton, Georgia	2009	Pebblebrook High School
East Alabama Big Train	Oxford, Alabama	2008	Oxford High School Field
Newnan Barves	Newnan, Georgia	2009	Joe Pope Field (Newnan High School), Hawks Field (The Heritage School)
Columbus Wood Bats	Columbus, Georgia	2009	Charles F. Ragsdale Field (Columbus State University)
Georgia Stars	Lagrange, Georgia	2006, 2007, 2009, 2010	La Grange College

=== Defunct and former teams ===
Team name	Location	Seasons	Notes
Columbus Chain	Columbus, Georgia	2008	Scheduled to compete in the South Division, never played a game due to management team.
Conyers Miracle	Conyers, Georgia	2006–2008	
Georgia Stars	LaGrange, Georgia	2006–2008	Charter Member
Mentium Athletics	Conyers, Georgia	2008	
Windward Academy	Alpharetta, Georgia	2006–2009	
Thomasville Bombers		2006–2009	
Florida Legends		2008–2009	
World of Baseball Angels		2009	
NCF Baseball Stars		2009	
St Augustine Saints		2008, 2009	

=== Future teams ===
In a series of press releases, the Great South League announced it would again expand in the 2011 season, to 30 teams in a seven state area. Likewise, the 2010 season will feature three divisions, each with 5-6 teams plus an "At Large" division. The North Division will consist of seven members joining from the Carolina-Virginia League. Meanwhile, the East and West Divisions will consist of both new teams and current members. A new team, the Tennessee Styx, will be in the "At Large" Division. The GSL has announced expansion plans for 2011 with two new Divisions, Northwest including teams from Tennessee: Knoxville, Athens, Cleveland, and Chattanooga TN and a Metro Atlanta Division consisting of 6 teams.

== Championship history ==
Season	Champion	Record	Pitcher of Year	Player of the Year
2006	Georgia Stars	35-1	Joey Merrifield (Georgia Stars)	Josh Reddick (Savannah Chain)
2007	Athens Pirates	29-11		
2008	North Florida Legends	22-6-1		
2009	Thomasville Bombers	18-16-1		
2010	Newnan Braves	20-14		

== 2008 final standings ==
North Division

Team	Record
Athens	18-13
Windward Academy	16-13
Augusta	16-17
Mentium	11-21
Conyers	12-23
Georgia Sports Academy	4-17

South Division

Team	Record
North Florida	22-6-1
East Alabama	19-8
Georgia	12-9
Thomasville	16-16-1
St. Augustine	9-12
