= L. P. Frans Stadium =

Baseball stadium in Hickory, North Carolina

L.P. Frans Stadium

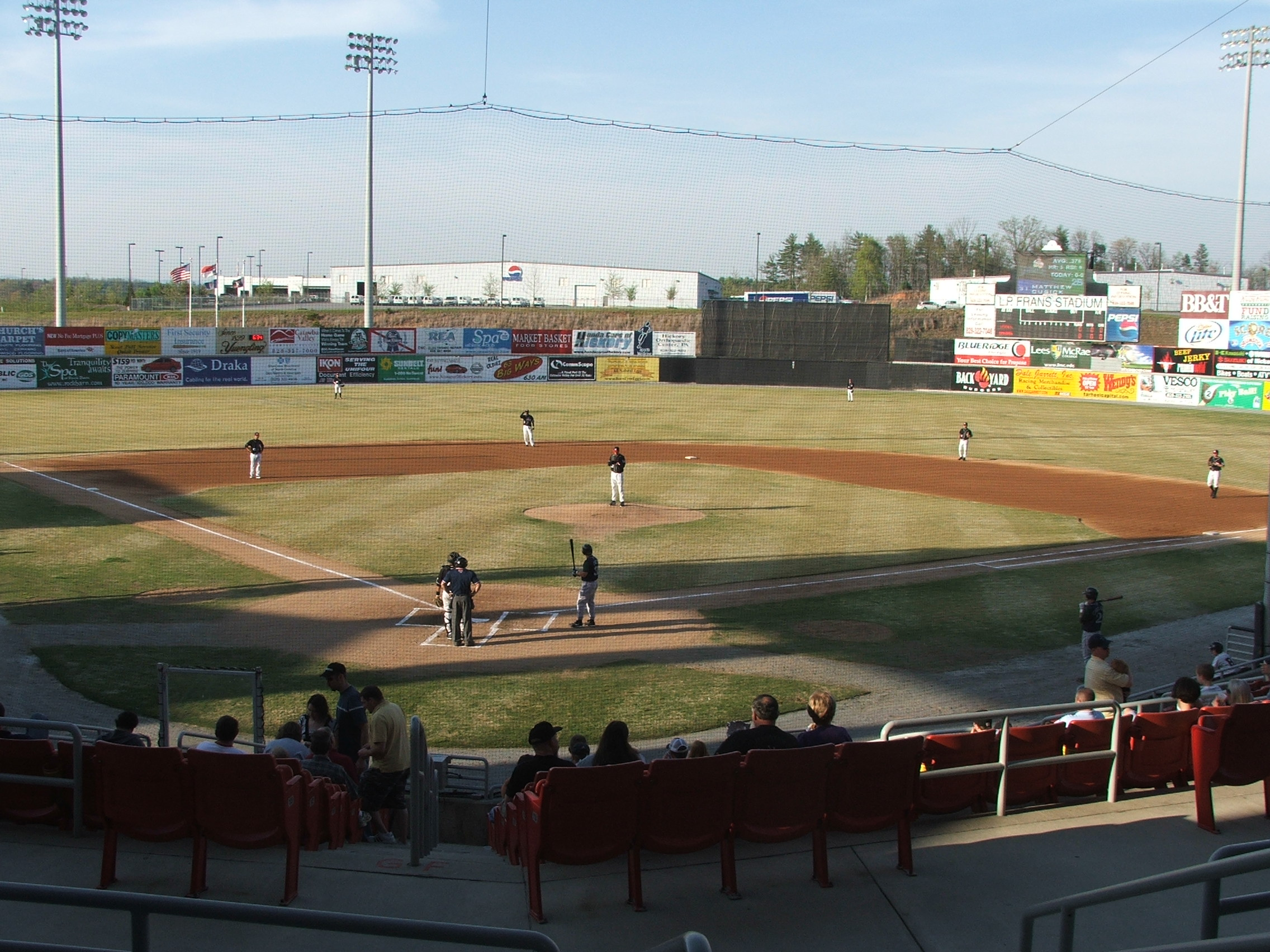
- Interactive map of L.P. Frans Stadium
- Location: 2500 Clement Boulevard; Hickory, North Carolina, US
- Coordinates: 35°44′57″N 81°22′43″W
- Owner: Hickory Baseball, Inc.
- Operator: Hickory Baseball, Inc.
- Capacity: 5,062 (4,000 fixed seats)
- Surface: Grass
- Record attendance: 5,283
- Field size: Left Field: 330 feet (100 m); Center Field: 401 feet (122 m); Right Field: 330 feet (100 m)

Construction
- Groundbreaking: September 21, 1992
- Opened: April 16, 1993
- Cost: $4.5 million ($10 million in 2025 dollars)
- Architects: Lescher and Mahoney; CBSA Architects, Inc.
- Services engineers: Brittain Engineering, Inc.
- General contractors: Wayne Brothers, Inc.

Tenants
- Hickory Crawdads (SAL/CL) 1993–present Catawba Valley Stars (GSL/CVCL) 2009–present

L.P. Frans Stadium is a stadium in Hickory, North Carolina. It was built in 1993 and has a fixed seating capacity of roughly 4,000. It is primarily used for baseball, and is the home field of the Hickory Crawdads Minor League Baseball team previously of the South Atlantic League. In July 2024, MiLB announced that the Crawdads will join the Carolina League in 2025.

== Location ==
L.P. Frans Stadium is located across from Hickory Regional Airport approximately three miles (4.8 km) from I-40 in Winkler Park. It was built on land donated by Elmer Winkler in 1993 and named after the local Pepsi-Cola bottler who partially funded the stadium's construction.

== Improvements ==
Improvements made to the stadium after the 2013 season brought a brand new VIP section, a picnic pavilion, and three outdoor party patios. A completely renovated Crawdads Cafe, suites, and concourse were also a part of the improvements. Following the 2017 season, another round of renovations was announced. The renovations included a new HD video board, a new playing surface, renovated dugouts, replacing the outfield walls, and removing the support poles holding up the protective netting to improve sightlines.
