= Single-A =

Fourth-highest level of competition in Minor League Baseball

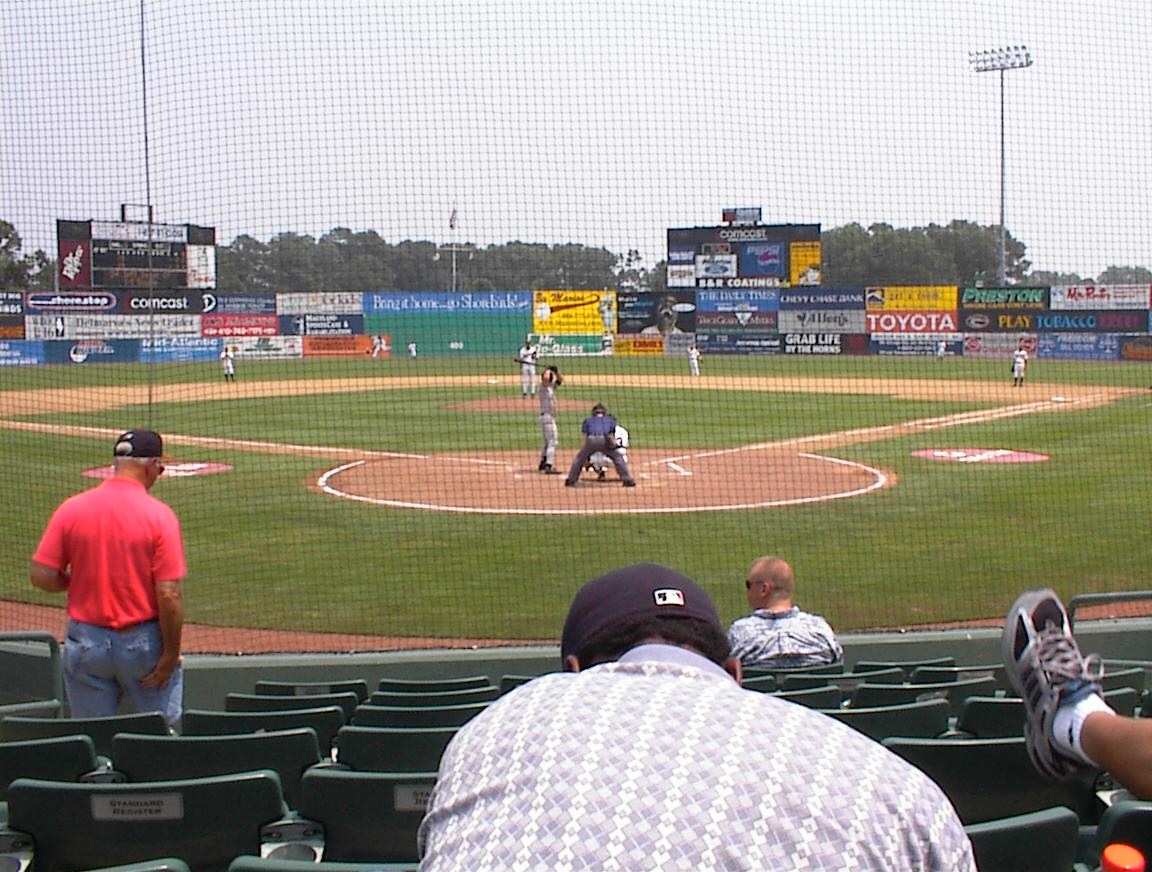
Arthur W. Perdue Stadium, home of the Class A Delmarva Shorebirds

Single-A, formerly known as Class A and sometimes as Low-A, is the fourth-highest level of play in Minor League Baseball in the United States, below Triple-A, Double-A, and High-A. There are 30 teams classified at the Single-A level, one for each team in Major League Baseball (MLB), organized into three leagues: the California League, Carolina League, and Florida State League.

== History ==
Class A was originally the highest level of Minor League Baseball, beginning with the earliest classifications, established circa 1890. Teams within leagues at this level had their players' contracts protected and the players were subject to reserve clauses. When the National Association of Professional Baseball Leagues – the formal name of Minor League Baseball – was founded in 1901, Class A remained the highest level, restricted to leagues with cities that had an aggregate population of over a million people. Entering the 1902 season, the only Class A leagues were the Eastern League and the Western League—both leagues had eight teams, in cities such as Toronto, Ontario; Buffalo, New York; Worcester, Massachusetts; Omaha, Nebraska; Denver, Colorado; and Peoria, Illinois. Leagues operating within less populated areas were classified as Class B, Class C, or Class D.

Class A remained the top classification until Class AA was established in 1912, then remained the second-highest classification until Class A1 was established in 1936. In 1946, the top two levels changed from being Class AA and Class A1 to being Class AAA and AA, with Class A remaining the third-highest level, above Classes B through D. Class A in 1946 consisted of the Eastern League and the original South Atlantic League (or "Sally League"), with teams in communities such as Vancouver, British Columbia; Omaha, Nebraska; Colorado Springs, Colorado; Charlotte, North Carolina; Scranton, Pennsylvania; and Allentown, Pennsylvania. Class A soon included the Western League (1947–1958), Central League (1948–1951) and Western International League (1952–1954). The Western International League became the Class B Northwest League in 1955, and the Western and Central loops folded.

The hierarchy of Triple-A through Class D continued until Minor League Baseball restructured in 1963, at which time Classes B through D were abolished, with existing leagues at those levels reassigned into Class A, while the South Atlantic League (renamed as the Southern League) and Eastern League ascended to Double-A.

In 1965, a Class A Short Season designation was created, for teams playing June–September schedules, primarily meant for new players acquired via the amateur draft. The Class A-Advanced designation was established in 1990, between Class A and Double-A in the minor league hierarchy. Class A and Class A Short Season were considered independent classifications, with Class A having "Full-Season" and Advanced sub-classifications, per the rules governing baseball's minor leagues. The overall hierarchy was:

1. Triple-A
2. Double-A
3. Class A-Advanced
4. Class A ("Full-Season A")
5. Class A Short Season ("Short-Season A")
6. Rookie league

Entering the 2020 minor league season (which was not played due to the COVID-19 pandemic), Class A consisted of the Midwest League and South Atlantic League (a newer "Sally League", which been formed in 1963 as the Western Carolinas League). Prior to the 2021 season, MLB restructured the minor leagues, eliminating Class A Short Season and discontinuing the use of all historical league names within Minor League Baseball. The Midwest League and South Atlantic League were reclassified as "High-A" leagues, and operated during 2021 as High-A Central and High-A East, respectively. They were replaced at the Class A level by three "Low-A" leagues: Low-A West, Low-A East, and Low-A Southeast. These leagues had historically been known as the California League, Carolina League, and Florida State League, respectively, and had previously operated at the Class A-Advanced level. These three leagues operated with Low-A naming for the 2021 season. Following MLB's acquisition of the rights to the names of the historical minor leagues, MLB announced on March 16, 2022, that the leagues would revert to their prior names, effective with the 2022 season. MLB also discontinued use of "Low-A" in favor of Single-A.

== Current teams ==
- Florida State League
- Carolina League
- California League

=== Florida State League ===
Division	Team	MLB affiliation	City	Stadium	Capacity
East	Daytona Tortugas	Cincinnati Reds	Daytona Beach, Florida	Jackie Robinson Ballpark	4,200
East	Jupiter Hammerheads	Miami Marlins	Jupiter, Florida	Roger Dean Stadium	6,871
East	Palm Beach Cardinals	St. Louis Cardinals	Jupiter, Florida	Roger Dean Stadium	6,871
East	St. Lucie Mets	New York Mets	Port St. Lucie, Florida	Clover Park	7,160
West	Bradenton Marauders	Pittsburgh Pirates	Bradenton, Florida	LECOM Park	8,500
West	Clearwater Threshers	Philadelphia Phillies	Clearwater, Florida	BayCare Ballpark	8,500
West	Dunedin Blue Jays	Toronto Blue Jays	Dunedin, Florida	TD Ballpark	8,500
West	Fort Myers Mighty Mussels	Minnesota Twins	Fort Myers, Florida	Hammond Stadium	9,300
West	Lakeland Flying Tigers	Detroit Tigers	Lakeland, Florida	Joker Marchant Stadium	8,500
West	Tampa Tarpons	New York Yankees	Tampa, Florida	George M. Steinbrenner Field	11,026

=== Carolina League ===
Division	Team	MLB affiliation	City	Stadium	Capacity
North	Delmarva Shorebirds	Baltimore Orioles	Salisbury, Maryland	Arthur W. Perdue Stadium	5,200
North	Fayetteville Woodpeckers	Houston Astros	Fayetteville, North Carolina	Segra Stadium	4,786
North	Fredericksburg Nationals	Washington Nationals	Fredericksburg, Virginia	Virginia Credit Union Stadium	5,000
North	Hill City Howlers	Cleveland Guardians	Lynchburg, Virginia	City Stadium	4,000
North	Salem RidgeYaks	Boston Red Sox	Salem, Virginia	Salem Memorial Ballpark	6,300
North	Wilson Warbirds	Milwaukee Brewers	Wilson, North Carolina	Wilson Ballpark	4,500
South	Augusta GreenJackets	Atlanta Braves	North Augusta, South Carolina	SRP Park	4,782
South	Charleston RiverDogs	Tampa Bay Rays	Charleston, South Carolina	Joseph P. Riley Jr. Park	6,000
South	Columbia Fireflies	Kansas City Royals	Columbia, South Carolina	Prisma Health Park	7,501
South	Hickory Crawdads	Texas Rangers	Hickory, North Carolina	L. P. Frans Stadium	5,062
South	Kannapolis Cannon Ballers	Chicago White Sox	Kannapolis, North Carolina	Atrium Health Ballpark	4,930
South	Myrtle Beach Pelicans	Chicago Cubs	Myrtle Beach, South Carolina	Pelicans Ballpark	6,599

=== California League ===
California League teams
Division	Team	MLB affiliation	City	Stadium	Capacity
North	Fresno Grizzlies	Colorado Rockies	Fresno, California	Chukchansi Park	10,650
North	San Jose Giants	San Francisco Giants	San Jose, California	Excite Ballpark	5,208
North	Stockton Ports	Athletics	Stockton, California	Banner Island Ballpark	5,200
North	Visalia Rawhide	Arizona Diamondbacks	Visalia, California	Valley Strong Ballpark	2,468
South	Inland Empire 66ers	Seattle Mariners	San Bernardino, California	San Manuel Stadium	8,000
South	Lake Elsinore Storm	San Diego Padres	Lake Elsinore, California	Lake Elsinore Diamond	5,160
South	Ontario Tower Buzzers	Los Angeles Dodgers	Ontario, California	ONT Field	6,000
South	Rancho Cucamonga Quakes	Los Angeles Angels	Rancho Cucamonga, California	Morongo Field	6,588

== Playoffs ==
The playoffs consist of a best-of-three divisional series, followed by a best-of-three championship series. The winners of the first half of the season will face the winner of the second half in the divisional series. In the event that the same club wins each half the club with the next highest winning percentage will advance to the divisional series.

== See also ==
- List of Single-A baseball team owners
