= Fredericksburg Nationals =

- Founded in 1984 in Woodbridge, Virginia; Based in Fredericksburg, Virginia since 2020
Team logo
Cap insignia

Minor league affiliations
- Class: Single-A (2021–present)
- Previous classes: Class A-Advanced (2020)
- League: Carolina League (1984–present)
- Division: North Division

Major league affiliations
- Team: Washington Nationals (2005–present)
- Previous teams: Cincinnati Reds (2003–2004); St. Louis Cardinals (1997–2002); Chicago White Sox (1994–1996); New York Yankees (1987–1993); Pittsburgh Pirates (1984–1986)

Minor league titles
- League titles (5): 1989; 2008; 2010; 2014; 2024
- Division titles (10): 1989; 1991; 1995; 2004; 2008; 2010; 2013; 2014; 2018; 2024
- First-half titles (1): 2026
- Second-half titles (3): 2022; 2024; 2025

Team data
- Name: Fredericksburg Nationals (2020–present)
- Previous names: Potomac Nationals (2005–2019); Potomac Cannons (1999–2004); Prince William Cannons (1989–1998); Prince William Yankees (1987–1988); Prince William Pirates (1984–1986)
- Colors: Red, white, blue
- Mascot: Gus
- Ballpark: Virginia Credit Union Stadium
- Previous parks: Northwest Federal Field at Pfitzner Stadium (1984–2019)
- Owner/ Operator: Diamond Baseball Holdings
- President: Seth Silber
- General manager: Robert Perry
- Manager: Chris O'Neill
- Website: milb.com/fredericksburg

The Fredericksburg Nationals are a Minor League Baseball team that is the Single-A affiliate of the Washington Nationals. They are located in Fredericksburg, Virginia, and play their home games at Virginia Credit Union Stadium, with a capacity of 5,000 people.

== History ==
In June 2018, Potomac Nationals owner Art Silber announced that he had signed a letter of intent to build a new stadium in Fredericksburg, Virginia, that would open in April 2020. The 5,000-seat multi-purpose stadium, as then planned, would include a 300-seat club facility and 13 suites. In November 2018, the Fredericksburg city council unanimously gave final approval for the Silber family to finance, build, and maintain the $35 million stadium with the city as an "anchor tenant" making an annual payment to the club of $1.05 million for 30 years.

A groundbreaking ceremony was held on February 24, 2019, but construction work did not begin until July or August 2019. On September 25, 2019, general manager Nick Hall said, "We're 100 percent planning on opening April 23." MASN reported on January 13, 2020, that Hall had said that construction was on schedule and that he was confident the venue would be ready for the 2020 season. With the 2020 season start postponed due to the COVID-19 pandemic, the Nationals held a virtual opening day on April 23, 2020. Hall said that the stadium was baseball-ready though construction was not yet complete, even though, with construction deemed as essential business, "The construction progress has gone off without a hitch." Construction was continuing at the start of June 2020. Since its inaugural 2021 season, the team has used the stadium, which in 2022 was renamed the Virginia Credit Union Stadium, under a 10-year naming rights deal.

As part of a process to give the team a new name that included Fredericksburg, a "Name the Team" contest that began in April 2019 received more than 2,400 responses on the team name, colors, mascots, and ways to incorporate local history and culture. On October 5, 2019, the team announced that it had changed its name to the Fredericksburg Nationals for the 2020 season and that its marketing nickname for the team – "P-Nats" when the team was the Potomac Nationals – would change to "FredNats."

The team's uniforms were revealed on November 16, 2019, along with a Mary Washington logo at an event on Mary Washington's 311th birthday.

In March 2020, the team unveiled their new mascot, Gus, described as "fat and fluffy" with purple fur and bright green eyebrows.

=== 2020 season ===
The 2020 minor league baseball season was initially postponed, and ultimately cancelled altogether, due to the COVID-19 pandemic. With no minor league season to play, Fredericksburg became the alternate training site for the Washington Nationals, hosting players who were not on the active roster, as well as a number of minor league players and instructors, during the 2020 season.

=== 2021 season ===
Before the Fredericksburg Nationals could play a game at the Class A-Advanced level, the team was notified in December 2020 that it would need to accept relegation to the Low-A level to continue to play as an affiliate of the Washington Nationals. Silber confirmed the Fredericksburg Nationals would continue their affiliation with Washington at the new level for 2021 and beyond. They were organized into a newly named league, the Low-A East.

Fredericksburg began competition on May 4, 2021, with a 16–3 loss to the Lynchburg Hillcats at Bank of the James Stadium in Lynchburg, Virginia. The Nationals played their first home game at FredNats Ballpark on May 11, 2021, losing to the Delmarva Shorebirds, 7–5, with 2,065 people in attendance.

The team finished its inaugural 2021 season with a 44–76 win-loss record, ending in fourth (last) place in the North Division of the Low-A East League. However, the team's total attendance of 199,071 was the highest in its division.

=== 2022 season ===
In 2022, the Low-A East renamed itself as the Carolina League, the name historically used by the regional circuit prior to the 2021 reorganization, and was reclassified as a Single-A circuit. The League also changed its structure, from three four-team divisions to two six-team divisions.

The team finished the 2022 regular season with a 75–55 overall win-loss record, first in the Carolina League's North Division. More specifically, Fredericksburg finished fifth in its division in the season's first half, with a 33–33 record, and first in the second half with a 42–22 record. In the first round of Carolina League playoffs, the FredNats fell in 3 games to Lynchburg in the best-of-three game series, as the North Division's first-place teams in the two halves of the season.

=== 2023 season ===
The team finished the 2023 regular season with a 65–63 overall win-loss record, third in the Carolina League's North Division. More specifically, Fredericksburg finished third in its division in the season's first half, with a 30–33 record, and third in the second half with a 35–30 record.

=== 2024 season; first league championship ===
On September 18, 2024, the FredNats beat the Kannapolis Cannon Ballers, 3–0, at home, in the third game of a 3-game series to win their first Carolina League championship.

=== 2025 season: Sale of the team ===
On June 9, 2025, the Silber family announced that the FredNats had been sold to Diamond Baseball Holdings, joining their fellow Nationals affiliate Harrisburg Senators among Diamond's MiLB holdings.

== Season-by-season results ==
| League | The team's final position in the league standings |
| Division | The team's final position in the divisional standings |
| GB | Games behind the team that finished in first place in the division that season |

| Season | League | Regular-season | | | | | Postseason | | | MLB affiliate | Ref. |
| Season | League | Record | Win % | League | Division | GB | Record | Win % | Result | MLB affiliate | Ref. |
|---|---|---|---|---|---|---|---|---|---|---|---|
| 2021 | A-E | 44–76 | .367 | 11th | 4th | 27 | — | — | — | Washington Nationals | |
| 2022 | CAR | 75–55 | .577 | 3rd | 1st | — | 1–2 | .333 | Won Second-Half Northern Division title Lost Northern Division title vs. Lynchburg Hillcats, 2–1 | Washington Nationals | |
| 2023 | CAR | 65–63 | .508 | 6th | 4th | 7.5 | — | — | — | Washington Nationals | |
| 2024 | CAR | 74–57 | .565 | 2nd | 2nd | 5 | 4–1 | .800 | Won Second-Half Northern Division title Won Northern Division title vs. Carolina Mudcats, 2–0; Won Carolina League championship vs. Kannapolis Cannon Ballers, 2–1 | Washington Nationals | |
| 2025 | CAR | 65–64 | .504 | 8th | 4th | 5 | 0–2 | .000 | Won Second-Half Northern Division title Lost Northern Division title vs. Lynchburg Hillcats, 2–0 | Washington Nationals | |
| Totals | — | 323–315 | .506 | — | — | — | 5–5 | .500 | — | — | — |

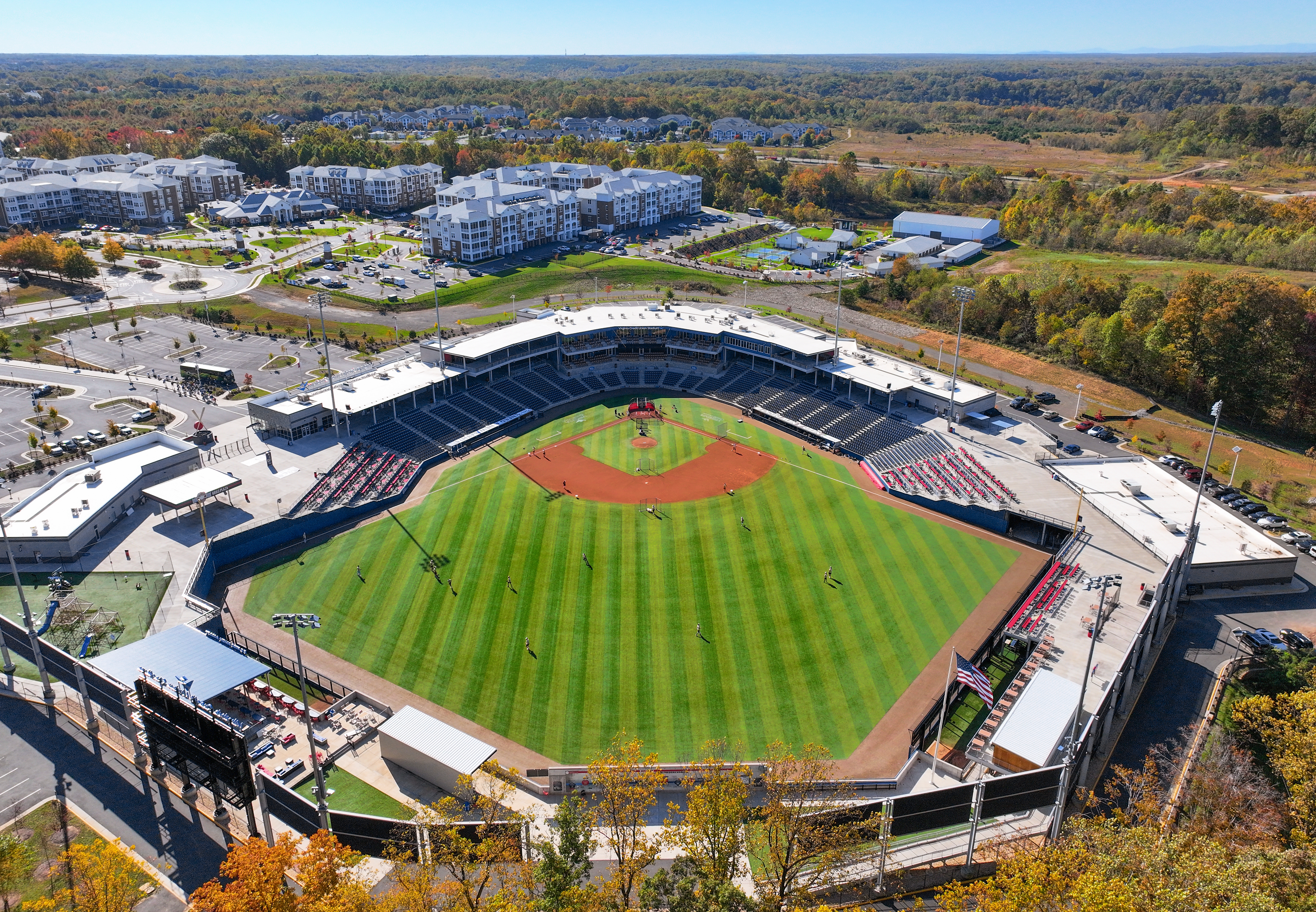
Virginia Credit Union Stadium in 2023

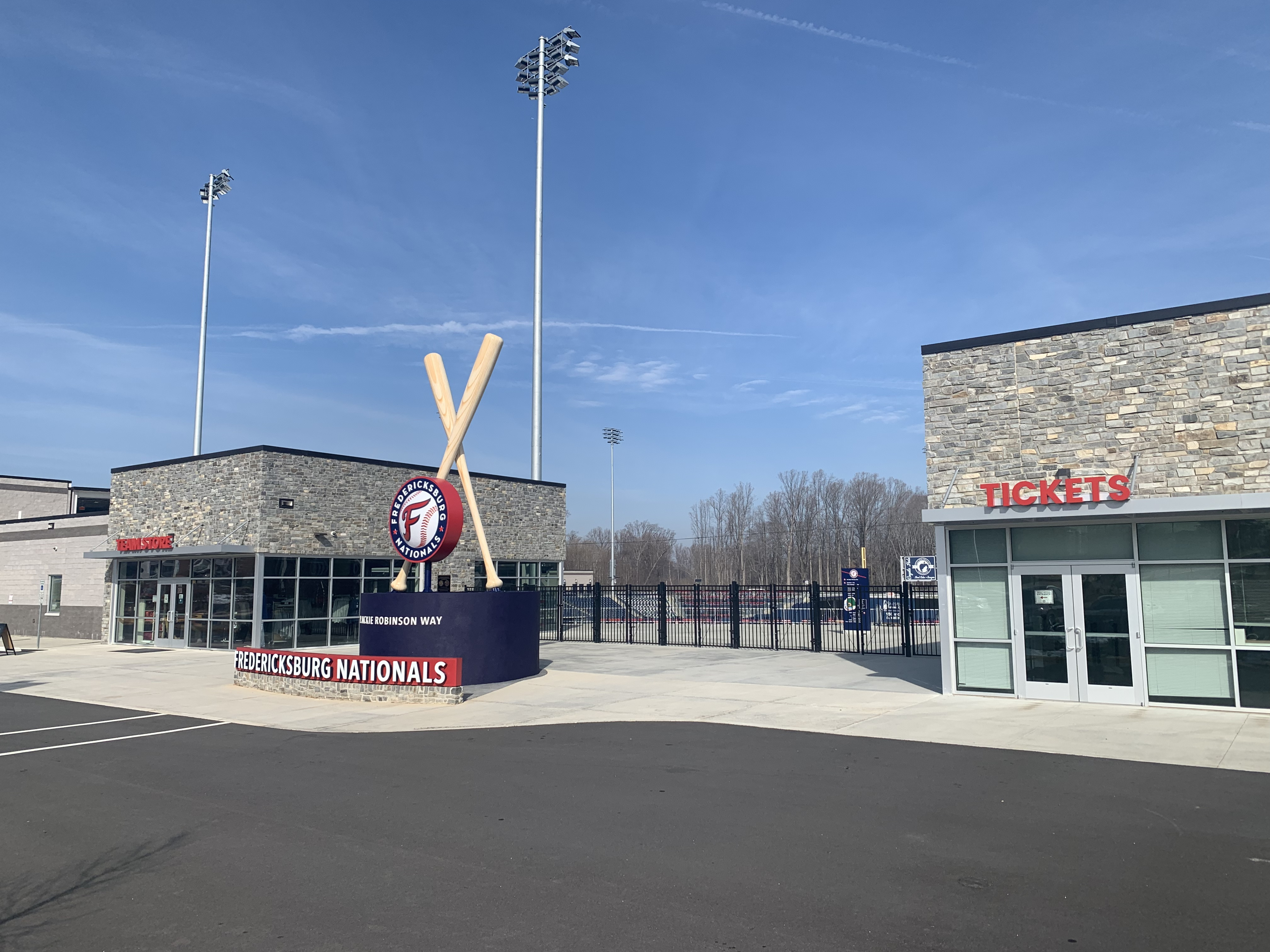
Ballpark main entrance

== Roster ==
Fredericksburg Nationals roster
| Players | Coaches/Other |
|---|---|
| Pitchers: 38 Merritt Beeker; 29 Adam Boucher; 34 Sam Brodersen; 41 Leodarlyn Colon; 33 Marlon De La Cruz; 18 Landon Harmon; 43 Cody Howard; 31 Levi Huesman ~; 10 Kaleb Kantola; 25 Zack Konstantinovsky; 26 Alexander Meckley; 37 Noah Millikan; 27 Ryan Minckler ~; 14 Trevor Moore; 15 Tony Neubeck; 40 Tyler Papenbrock; 22 Leuris Portorreal ~; 19 Juan Reyes; 12 Cesar Rojas; 15 L.J. Waco; 32 Jacob Weaver; Catchers: 17 Cashel Dugger; 8 Christian Fagnant ~; 23 Sir Jamison Jones; Infielders: 5 Manuel Cabrera; 24 Juan Cruz; 28 Hunter Hines; 7 Coy James; 21 Kevin Made #; 2 Avery Ortiz; 16 Rafael Ramirez Jr.; Outfielders: 11 Gavin Fien; 13 Elian Soto; 9 Dashyll Tejeda; 20 Cristhian Vaquero; 1 Jordan Williams | Manager: 4 Chris O'Neill; Coaches: 39 Luke Dziados (pitching); 35 Isaac Kim (coach); 6 Anthony Ray (defensive); 51 Jake Scheiner (hitting); 36 Luis Villanueva (assistant pitching); 60-day injured list: -- Jonah Conradt (full season); -- Nick Hollifield; -- Nolan Hughes; -- Bryant Olson (full season); -- Owen Puk; 7-day injured list; * On Washington Nationals 40-man roster; ~ Development list; # Rehab assignment; ∞ Reserve list; ‡ Restricted list; § Suspended list; † Temporarily inactive list; Roster updated August 25, 2026; Transactions; → More rosters: MiLB • Carolina League; → Washington Nationals minor league players |

== See also ==
- Sports in Washington, D.C.
