= Carolina League =

Minor League Baseball league

- Current season, competition or edition: 2026 Carolina League season
- Classification: Single-A (2021–present); Class A-Advanced (1990–2020); Class A (1963–1989); Class B (1949–1962); Class C (1945–1948)
- Sport: Baseball
- Founded: 1945 (81 years ago)
- No. of teams: 12
- Country: United States
- Most recent champion: Fayetteville Woodpeckers (2026)
- Most titles: Winston-Salem Dash (11)
- Level on pyramid: Single-A
- Website: https://www.milb.com/carolina-league?DB_OEM_ID=31200

The Carolina League is a Minor League Baseball league which has operated along the Atlantic Coast of the United States since 1945. Having been classified at various levels throughout its existence, it operated at Class A-Advanced from 1990 until its demotion to Single-A following Major League Baseball's 2021 reorganization of the minor leagues. The league temporarily operated for the 2021 season as the Low-A East before reassuming its original moniker in 2022.

The organization that later became the Carolina League formed in 1945, just as World War II was ending, and consisted of eight teams, six from North Carolina and two from southern Virginia. This later grew to as many as 12 teams at times.

== History ==
The Carolina League was announced on October 29, 1944, after an organizational meeting at Durham, North Carolina. It was a successor to the Class D Bi-State League that existed before World War II. The league began play in 1945 with eight teams based in Burlington, Durham, Greensboro, Leaksville, Raleigh, Winston-Salem (all from North Carolina), along with Danville and Martinsville from Virginia.

A few of the many Carolina League players who have gone on to star in the Major Leagues include Baseball Hall of Famers like: Johnny Bench (Peninsula, 1966), Wade Boggs (Winston-Salem, 1977), Rod Carew (Wilson, 1966), Chipper Jones (Durham, 1992), Willie McCovey (Danville, 1956), Joe Morgan (Durham, 1963), Dave Parker (Salem, 1972), Tony Pérez (Rocky Mount, 1962), and Carl Yastrzemski (Raleigh, 1959). Other notable future Major League players who honed their skills in the Carolina League include Barry Bonds (Prince William, 1985), Dock Ellis (Kinston, 1965), Dwight Evans (Winston-Salem, 1971), Dwight Gooden (Lynchburg, 1983), Zack Greinke (Wilmington, 2003), Andruw Jones (Durham, 1996), Andy Pettitte (Prince William, 1993), Jorge Posada (Prince William, 1993), Darryl Strawberry (Lynchburg, 1981), and Bernie Williams (Prince William, 1988).

Director and screenwriter Ron Shelton's 1988 film Bull Durham, starring Kevin Costner, Tim Robbins, and Susan Sarandon, depicted a fictionalized account of the Durham Bulls, at that time a Carolina League team (they have since become a Triple-A team in the International League). Before he began making films, Shelton had a five-year minor league career in the Baltimore Orioles' organization, which included a stint in the International League.

The Carolina League added two expansion teams for the 2017 season to fill two vacant spots at the Class A-Advanced level previously occupied by the California League's Bakersfield Blaze and High Desert Mavericks, which ceased operations at the end of the 2016 season. These additional teams were the Down East Wood Ducks in Kinston, North Carolina, and the Buies Creek Astros in Buies Creek, North Carolina. After the 2018 season, the Buies Creek Astros relocated to Fayetteville, North Carolina as the Fayetteville Woodpeckers. After the 2019 season, the Potomac Nationals relocated within Northern Virginia to Fredericksburg, rebranding themselves as the Fredericksburg Nationals.

The start of the 2020 season was postponed due to the COVID-19 pandemic before ultimately being cancelled on June 30. As part of Major League Baseball's 2021 reorganization of the minor leagues, the Carolina League was demoted to Single-A and temporarily renamed the "Low-A East" for the 2021 season. In the realignment process, the Frederick Keys were demoted out of professional baseball into the hybrid amateur/professional MLB Draft League, the Wilmington Blue Rocks and Winston-Salem Dash were shifted to the South Atlantic League (retaining their High-A status), and five teams were moved from the old SAL to bring the CL to twelve member teams. Following MLB's acquisition of the rights to the names of the historical minor leagues, the Carolina League name was restored effective with the 2022 season.

In July 2024, MiLB announced that the Hickory Crawdads will join the Carolina League in 2025, replacing the Down East Wood Ducks.

== Current teams ==
| Division | Team | MLB affiliation | City | Stadium | Capacity |
|---|---|---|---|---|---|
| North | Delmarva Shorebirds | Baltimore Orioles | Salisbury, Maryland | Arthur W. Perdue Stadium | 5,200 |
| North | Fayetteville Woodpeckers | Houston Astros | Fayetteville, North Carolina | Segra Stadium | 4,786 |
| North | Fredericksburg Nationals | Washington Nationals | Fredericksburg, Virginia | Virginia Credit Union Stadium | 5,000 |
| North | Hill City Howlers | Cleveland Guardians | Lynchburg, Virginia | City Stadium | 4,000 |
| North | Salem RidgeYaks | Boston Red Sox | Salem, Virginia | Salem Memorial Ballpark | 6,300 |
| North | Wilson Warbirds | Milwaukee Brewers | Wilson, North Carolina | Wilson Ballpark | 4,500 |
| South | Augusta GreenJackets | Atlanta Braves | North Augusta, South Carolina | SRP Park | 4,782 |
| South | Charleston RiverDogs | Tampa Bay Rays | Charleston, South Carolina | Joseph P. Riley Jr. Park | 6,000 |
| South | Columbia Fireflies | Kansas City Royals | Columbia, South Carolina | Prisma Health Park | 7,501 |
| South | Hickory Crawdads | Texas Rangers | Hickory, North Carolina | L. P. Frans Stadium | 5,062 |
| South | Kannapolis Cannon Ballers | Chicago White Sox | Kannapolis, North Carolina | Atrium Health Ballpark | 4,930 |
| South | Myrtle Beach Pelicans | Chicago Cubs | Myrtle Beach, South Carolina | Pelicans Ballpark | 6,599 |

North Division, South Division

== All-time teams (1945–present) ==
All teams that have competed in the Carolina League since its founding in 1945:

- Alamance Indians (1958–1964, became the Burlington Senators)
- Alexandria Dukes (1978, became the Alexandria Mariners)
- Alexandria Dukes (1980–1983, became the Prince William Pirates)
- Alexandria Mariners (1979, became the Alexandria Dukes)
- Asheville Tourists (1967, moved to Southern League)
- Augusta GreenJackets (2021–present)
- Buies Creek Astros (2017–2018; became the Fayetteville Woodpeckers)
- Burlington Bees (1945–1951, became the Burlington-Graham Pirates)
- Burlington Rangers (1972, folded)
- Burlington Senators (1965–1971, became the Burlington Rangers)
- Burlington-Graham Pirates (1952–1955, folded)
- Carolina Mudcats (2012–2025, became the Wilson Warbirds)
- Charleston RiverDogs (2021–present)
- Columbia Fireflies (2021–present)
- Danville 97s (1998, became the Myrtle Beach Pelicans)
- Danville Leafs (1945–1958, folded)
- Delmarva Shorebirds (2021–present)
- Down East Wood Ducks (2017–2024, moved to Spartanburg SC and renamed the Hub City Spartanburgers of the South Atlantic League)
- Durham Bulls (1945–1967, merged with the Raleigh Pirates and became the Raleigh-Durham Mets)
- Durham Bulls (1980–1997, became the Danville 97s)
- Fayetteville Athletics (1950–1952, became the Fayetteville Highlanders)
- Fayetteville Highlanders (1953–1956, folded)
- Fayetteville Woodpeckers (2019–present)
- Frederick Keys (1989–2020, moved to MLB Draft League)
- Fredericksburg Nationals (2020–present)
- Greensboro Patriots (1945–1957, became the Greensboro Yankees)
- Greensboro Patriots (1968, folded)
- Greensboro Yankees (1958–1967, became the Greensboro Patriots)
- Hagerstown Suns (1981–1988, became the Frederick Keys)
- High Point-Thomasville Hi-Toms (1954–1958, folded)
- High Point-Thomasville Hi-Toms (1968, became the High Point-Thomasville Royals)
- High Point-Thomasville Royals (1969, folded)
- Hill City Howlers, Lynchburg VA (2026–present)
- Kannapolis Cannon Ballers (2021–present)
- Kinston Blue Jays (1982–1985, became the Kinston Eagles)
- Kinston Eagles (1956–1957, merged with the Wilson Tobs)
- Kinston Eagles (1962–1973, became the Kinston Expos)
- Kinston Eagles (1978–1981, became the Kinston Blue Jays)
- Kinston Eagles (1986, became the Kinston Indians)
- Kinston Expos (1974, folded)
- Kinston Indians (1987–2011, became the Carolina Mudcats)
- Leaksville-Draper-Spray Triplets (1945–1947, moved to the Blue Ridge League)
- Lynchburg Hillcats (1995–2025, renamed Hill City Howlers)
- Lynchburg Red Sox (1988–1994, renamed Lynchburg Hillcats)
- Lynchburg Mets (1976–1987, renamed Lynchburg Red Sox)
- Lynchburg Rangers (1975, renamed Lynchburg Mets)
- Lynchburg Twins (1970–1974, renamed Lynchburg Rangers)
- Lynchburg White Sox (1966–1969, renamed Lynchburg Twins)
- Martinsville Athletics (1945–1949, folded)
- Myrtle Beach Pelicans (1999–present)
- Peninsula Astros (1969–1970, became the Peninsula Phillies)
- Peninsula Grays (1964–1968, became the Peninsula Astros)
- Peninsula Pennants (1974, folded)
- Peninsula Phillies (1971, folded)
- Peninsula Pilots (1976–1985, became the Peninsula White Sox)
- Peninsula Pilots (1989–1992, became the Wilmington Blue Rocks)
- Peninsula Senators (1963, became the Peninsula Grays)
- Peninsula White Sox (1986–1987, became the Virginia Generals)
- Potomac Cannons (1999–2004, became the Potomac Nationals)
- Potomac Nationals (2005–2019, became the Fredericksburg Nationals)
- Prince William Cannons (1990–1998, became the Potomac Cannons)
- Prince William Pirates (1984–1986, became the Prince William Yankees)
- Prince William Yankees (1987–1989, became the Prince William Cannons)
- Raleigh Capitals (1957–1962, became the Raleigh Mets)
- Raleigh Capitals (1945–1953, folded)
- Raleigh Cardinals (1964–1965, became the Raleigh Pirates)
- Raleigh Mets (1963, became the Raleigh Cardinals)
- Raleigh Pirates (1966–1967, merged with the Durham Bulls and became the Raleigh-Durham Mets)
- Raleigh-Durham Mets (1968, became the Raleigh-Durham Phillies)
- Raleigh-Durham Phillies (1969, became the Raleigh-Durham Triangles)
- Raleigh-Durham Triangles (1970–1971, folded)
- Red Springs Twins (1969, folded)
- Reidsville Luckies (1948–1954, became the Reidsville Phillies)
- Reidsville Phillies (1955, folded)
- Rocky Mount Leafs (1962–1963, became the Rocky Mount Senators)
- Rocky Mount Leafs (1965–1972, became the Rocky Mount Phillies)
- Rocky Mount Phillies (1973–1975, folded)
- Rocky Mount Pines (1980, became the Hagerstown Suns)
- Rocky Mount Senators (1964, became the Rocky Mount Leafs)
- Salem Avalanche (1995–2008, became the Salem Red Sox)
- Salem Buccaneers (1987–1994, became the Salem Avalanche)
- Salem Pirates (1972–1979, became the Salem Redbirds)
- Salem Rebels (1968–1971, became the Salem Pirates)
- Salem Red Sox (2009–2025, became the Salem RidgeYaks)
- Salem Redbirds (1980–1986, became the Salem Buccaneers)
- Salem RidgeYaks (2026–present)
- Tidewater Tides (1963–1968, moved to the International League)
- Virginia Generals (1988, became the Peninsula Pilots)
- Wilmington Blue Rocks (1993–2020, moved to High-A East)
- Wilson Pennants (1973, folded)
- Wilson Tobs (1956–1968, folded)
- Wilson Warbirds (2026–present)
- Winston-Salem Cardinals (1945–1953, became the Winston-Salem Twins)
- Winston-Salem Dash (2009–2020, moved to High-A East)
- Winston-Salem Red Birds (1957–1960, became the Winston-Salem Red Sox)
- Winston-Salem Red Sox (1961–1983, became the Winston-Salem Spirits)
- Winston-Salem Spirits (1984–1994, became the Winston-Salem Warthogs)
- Winston-Salem Twins (1954–1956, became the Winston-Salem Red Birds)
- Winston-Salem Warthogs (1995–2008, became the Winston-Salem Dash)

=== League timeline (1945–present) ===
Current team Earlier team
