= SRP Park =

Baseball park in North Augusta, South Carolina

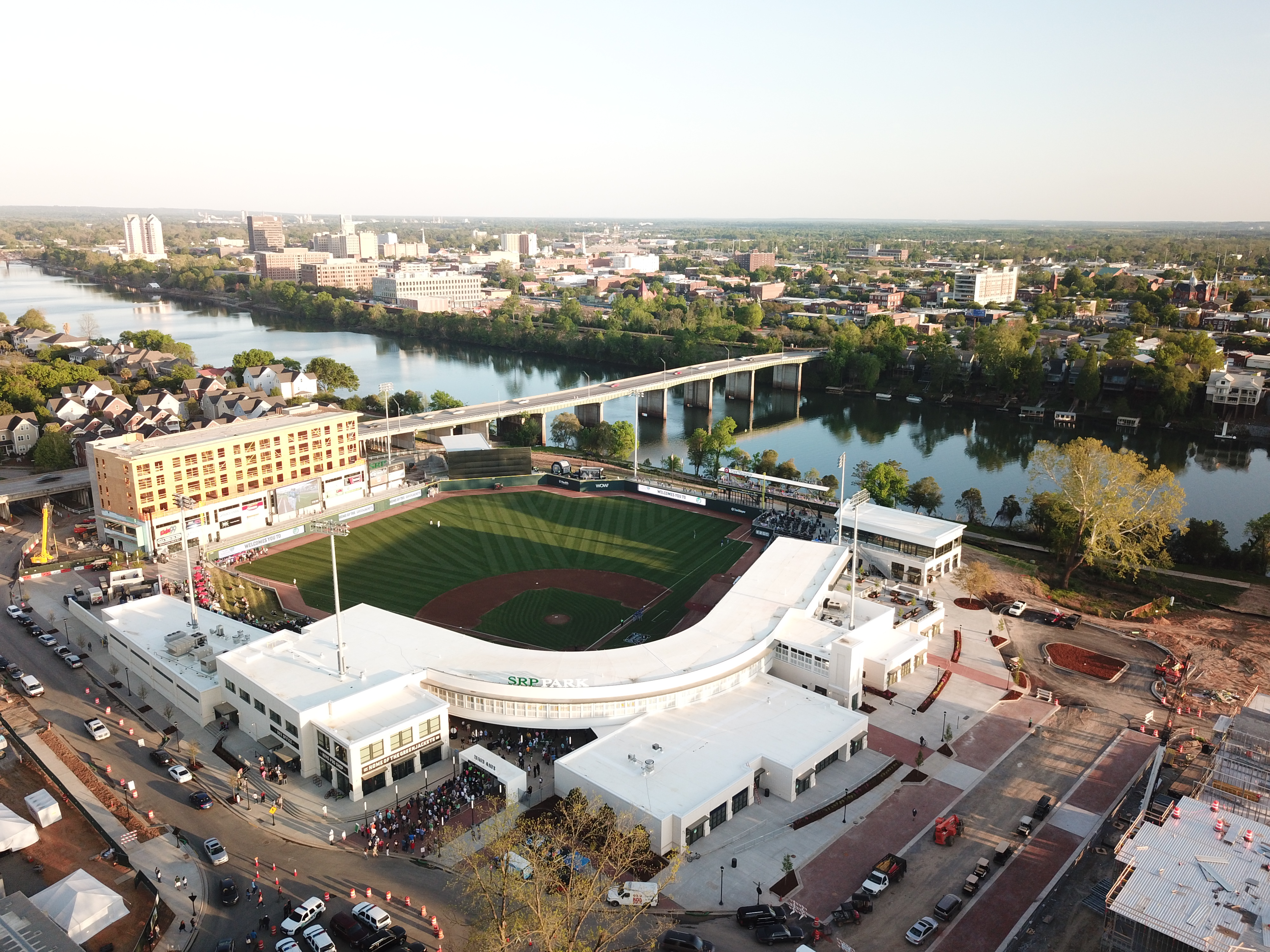
- Interactive map of SRP Park
- Location: 187 Railroad Ave; North Augusta, South Carolina, US
- Coordinates: 33°29′02″N 81°58′26″W
- Owner: City of North Augusta
- Operator: Greenestone Properties
- Capacity: 5,000
- Surface: Grass
- Field size: Left Field: 330 feet (100 m); Center Field: 395 feet (120 m); Right Field: 318 feet (97 m)

Construction
- Groundbreaking: May 25, 2017
- Opened: April 10, 2018
- Cost: $40 million
- Architect: Odell Associates
- Project managers: Greenestone Development Services, LLC.
- General contractors: Brasfield & Gorrie, LLC

Tenant
- Augusta GreenJackets (SAL/CL) 2018–present

SRP Park is a baseball park in North Augusta, South Carolina, which is part of the Augusta, Georgia metropolitan area. It is the home of the Augusta GreenJackets, a Minor League Baseball team playing in the Single-A Carolina League. It opened on April 12, 2018, and can seat 4,782 people. SRP Park replaced Lake Olmstead Stadium as the home of the GreenJackets.

SRP Park is part of the Riverside Village at Hammond's Ferry, which overlooks the Savannah River and the city of Augusta, featuring 280 apartments, over 100,000 square feet (9,300 m^{2}) of office space, a Crowne Plaza hotel, and multiple shops, restaurants, and bars.

== History ==
=== Planning ===
In 2007 the Ripken Baseball group, prior owners of the GreenJackets, began talks with the City of Augusta on a new riverfront ballpark to replace Lake Olmstead Stadium. After four fruitless years, a developer and the City of North Augusta proposed a new ballpark as the focal point of a mixed-use development on the northern shore of the Savannah River, across from Augusta. A basic agreement was struck between the team, Jacoby Development and the City of North Augusta on 35 marshy acres in 2011.

== Design ==
SRP Park holds around 5,000-6,000 for baseball, with the park being capable of holding larger events for up to ten thousand. The park and surrounding area were designed as “a great place first," with designers working with the City of North Augusta to conceive the ballpark “as the new living room for North Augusta" according to lead designer Tad Shultz. "We wanted to make the space so great that people would want to come there even when there's no baseball game."

One of SRP Park's most outstanding features is the TaxSlayer Terrace that towers over right field. The tax-prep company that bought the naming rights is headquartered in Augusta. From this platform, fans have views of the Savannah River and the 13th Street Bridge that crosses it. Due to the dimensions of the park, the distance from home plate to the base of the wall down the right-field line is only 318 feet. A short distance to clear for a home run until Minor League Baseball made the park extend the yellow line for a home run vertically fifteen feet. Now a home run hit to right field must clear the bottom of the porch's floor, twenty-five feet above the playing surface.

Upper-level club seats were designed intentionally to be close to the field only twenty-six feet from the grass, the closest of any Minor League park. The Wow! Club down the first base line is 3,300 square feet with an outdoor patio as well. The bar tucked between the suites and the enclosed club area on the third base side is called the South Carolina State Dispensary, taking its name from a store that over a century ago was located exactly where the ballpark is now. When the excavation for the lowered playing field was taking place, many bottles of liquor from this era were recovered from the ground and several are now displayed at the end of the bar. A group area near the right-field foul pole called the E-Z-Go Picnic Patio and a grass berm beyond third base down the left field line round out some of the park's features. The Hive Pro Shop is located on Railroad Ave adjacent to the park's main entrance and includes entrances inside and outside the park that allow for shopping even when the GreenJackets are not playing.

In August 2017, the North Augusta-based SRP Federal Credit Union purchased the naming rights to the ballpark for an undisclosed sum.

SRP Park was awarded the Ballpark of The Year award for 2018 by BaseballParks.com and BallparkDigest.com. The BallPark Digest honor made it three consecutive years for parks winning the award in their inaugural season after the GreenJackets parent club Atlanta Braves' Truist Park won in 2017 and Segra Park in 2016.

== Opening ==
Following the completion of the park, it was announced the GreenJackets' 2018 home opener would take place on April 12 against the Lexington Legends. However, it was later announced that the stadium would have a "soft launch" on April 9 for a high school baseball game between Greenbrier High School of Evans, Georgia, and North Augusta High School of North Augusta, South Carolina with Greenbrier winning 8–3 over North Augusta. Clemson then played Georgia in a college baseball matchup the next day with the Bulldogs defeating the Tigers 6–3.

The GreenJackets played their first home game at SRP Park on April 12, 2018. They were defeated by Lexington, 6–5. The game was attended by 5,919 people.

The park hosts several local high school games and midweek, nonconference college baseball matchups in the weeks leading up to the start of the minor league season. Universities such as Clemson, Charleston Southern, Georgia, Georgia Southern, and South Carolina have participated. In 2022, the park began hosting the annual HBCU Baseball Classic with local HBCU Paine College hosting rival schools.
