= Fayetteville Woodpeckers =

- Founded in 2017 in Buies Creek, North Carolina; Based in Fayetteville, North Carolina since 2019
Team logo
Cap insignia

Minor league affiliations
- Class: Single-A (2021–present)
- Previous classes: Class A-Advanced (2017–2020)
- League: Carolina League (2017–present)
- Division: North Division

Major league affiliations
- Team: Houston Astros (2017–present)

Minor league titles
- League titles (2): 2018; 2026
- Division titles (3): 2018; 2019; 2026
- Second-half titles (1): 2026

Team data
- Name: Fayetteville Woodpeckers (2019–present)
- Previous names: Buies Creek Astros (2017–2018)
- Colors: Black, red, gray, white
- Ballpark: Segra Stadium (2019–present)
- Previous parks: Jim Perry Stadium (2017–2018)
- Owner/ Operator: Diamond Baseball Holdings
- Manager: Carlos Lugo
- Website: milb.com/fayetteville

The Fayetteville Woodpeckers are a Minor League Baseball team of the Carolina League and the Single-A affiliate of the Houston Astros. They are located in Fayetteville, North Carolina, and play their home games at Segra Stadium. From 2017 to 2018, the team was known as the Buies Creek Astros and played at Jim Perry Stadium on the campus of Campbell University in Buies Creek, North Carolina.

== History ==
=== Buies Creek ===
The Houston Astros began to scout locations for a baseball stadium to locate a team in Fayetteville in April 2016. In August 2016, a two-team expansion to the Carolina League was approved, with the first franchise assigned to Kinston, North Carolina.

The Fayetteville City Council approved plans to build a new stadium by 2019. This required the team to find a temporary location to play the 2017 and 2018 seasons. On November 17, it was announced the team would play at Jim Perry Stadium on the campus of Campbell University in Buies Creek and be known as the Buies Creek Astros for their first two seasons. The Astros signed a 30-year lease agreement with the city of Fayetteville in December 2016.

The Buies Creek Astros replaced the Bakersfield Blaze at the Class A-Advanced level, but are not the continuation of the Blaze. The Blaze folded along with the High Desert Mavericks after the 2016 season, contracting the California League and expanding the Carolina League. The Mavericks were replaced by the Kinston-based Down East Wood Ducks.

The Astros won the 2018 Carolina League championship.

=== Fayetteville ===
A name-the-team contest was launched to select a name for the team upon its move to Fayetteville. The finalists, selected from over 1,400 suggestions, were "Fatbacks," "Fly Traps," "Jumpers," "Wood Dogs," and "Woodpeckers." The chosen name, "Woodpeckers," was selected in honor of the red-cockaded woodpecker which was once plentiful in Fayetteville but is now an endangered species. The team's colors are black, gray, and red.

The Woodpeckers won in their first game, defeating the Potomac Nationals on the road by a score of 15–0 on April 4, 2019. The Woodpeckers played their first home game at Segra Stadium on April 18 against the Carolina Mudcats. Fayetteville lost to Carolina, 7–5, before a sellout crowd.

In conjunction with Major League Baseball's restructuring of Minor League Baseball in 2021, the Woodpeckers were organized into the Low-A East at the Low-A classification. In 2022, the Low-A East became known as the Carolina League, the name historically used by the regional circuit prior to the 2021 reorganization, and was reclassified as a Single-A circuit.

In December 2025, the Houston Astros sold the team, along with its other minor league affiliates (Sugar Land Space Cowboys and Corpus Christi Hooks) to Diamond Baseball Holdings.

== Roster ==
Fayetteville Woodpeckers roster
Players	Coaches/Other
Pitchers: 77 Adrian Ardines; 44 Jagger Beck; 45 Tazwell Butler; 18 Jesus Carrera; 75 John Carver; 0 Brandon Cassedy; 46 Carson Estridge; 21 Juan Fraide; 38 Ryan Mathiesen; 36 Jank Pichardo; 26 Leomar Rosario; 39 Jose Serrano; 30 Aubrey Smith; 41 Brady Thomas; 47 Mick Uebelhor; 17 Ryan Verdugo; 66 Charlie Weber; Catchers: 20 Carlos Cauro; 35 Luis De Leon; 99 Arturo Flores; 16 Rashawn Galloway; Infielders: 6 Camilo Diaz ~; 19 Kam Durnin; 16 Curtis Hebert; 27 Waner Luciano; 4 Aaron Piasecki; 3 German Ramirez §; 8 Petey Soto Jr.; 43 Ben Tryon; Outfielders: 10 Kevin Alvarez †; 7 Logan Hughes; 11 Owen Nowak; 28 Juan Sierra; 1 Josh Wakefield	Manager: 29 Carlos Lugo; Coaches: 14 Tanner Montgomery (development); 23 Steve Serratore (hitting); 15 James Wiseman (pitching); 60-day injured list: 43 Luis Aguilar (full season); 77 Joey Dixon; 11 Cole MacRae; -- Julio Marte; -- Juan Nunez; 30 Gabel Pentecost (full season); 7-day injured list; * On Houston Astros 40-man roster; ~ Development list; # Rehab assignment; ∞ Reserve list; ‡ Restricted list; § Suspended list; † Temporarily inactive list; Roster updated August 31, 2026; Transactions; → More rosters: MiLB • Carolina League; → Houston Astros minor league players
