= Columbia Fireflies =

- Founded in 2016; Columbia, South Carolina
Team logo
Cap insignia

Minor league affiliations
- Class: Single-A (2021–present)
- Previous classes: Class A (2016–2020)
- League: Carolina League (2021–present)
- Division: South Division
- Previous leagues: South Atlantic League (2016–2020)

Major league affiliations
- Team: Kansas City Royals (2021–present)
- Previous teams: New York Mets (2016–2020)

Minor league titles
- Division titles (1): 2025
- First-half titles (1): 2025

Team data
- Name: Columbia Fireflies (2016–present); Savannah Sand Gnats (1996–2015); Savannah Cardinals (1984–1995)
- Colors: Navy blue, neon yellow, neon green, silver, white
- Mascot: Mason The Firefly
- Ballpark: Prisma Health Park (2016–present)
- Owner/ Operator: Hardball Capital LLC
- President: Brad Shank
- Manager: David Noworyta
- Website: milb.com/columbia

The Columbia Fireflies are a Minor League Baseball team based in Columbia, South Carolina, and are the Single-A affiliate of the Kansas City Royals of Major League Baseball. Their home stadium is Prisma Health Park. The team was previously known as the Savannah Sand Gnats (1995–2015) and relocated from Savannah, Georgia after the 2015 season. They are the only professional baseball team in Columbia, and the first since the Capital City Bombers moved to Greenville, South Carolina, after the 2004 season.

== History ==
Minor league baseball in Columbia dates back to 1892, when a team known as the Columbia Senators competed in the only season of the original South Atlantic League. In 1904, the Columbia Skyscrapers franchise was founded as a charter member of the second incarnation of the South Atlantic League. The capital city fielded teams in the league in 45 of the next 57 seasons under various nicknames (Gamecocks, Commies, Comers, Sandlappers, Senators, Reds, and Gems). After the 1961 season, the Columbia Reds moved to Macon, Georgia, and the city went without professional baseball for the next two decades. Columbia clubs won the South Atlantic League championship in 1915, 1917, 1919, 1920, 1921, 1941, and 1953. The league itself collapsed following the 1963 season.

After a 21-year absence from professional baseball, Columbia returned to affiliated ball when the Shelby Mets relocated to the capital city in the latest version of the South Atlantic League in 1983. Known as the Columbia Mets from 1983–92, and the Capital City Bombers beginning in 1993, the franchise competed in the SAL for 22 years, winning league titles in 1986, 1991 and 1998.

The Capital City Bombers moved to Greenville, South Carolina, after the 2004 season. The city of Columbia approved plans to build a stadium in 2014, with the goal of attracting a Minor League Baseball team. Spirit Communications, a local telecommunications company, purchased the naming rights for the stadium. In May 2015, the Savannah Sand Gnats of the Class A South Atlantic League, an affiliate of the New York Mets, announced that it would move to Columbia in time for the 2016 season.

After receiving over 2,300 submissions in a public contest to name the team, it chose to call itself the "Columbia Fireflies". The name was inspired by the Photinus frontalis in the nearby Congaree National Park which was outlined in an article entitled “Synchronized fireflies putting on show at Congaree National Park” by The State, a local newspaper. Portions of the team's uniforms glow in the dark as a tribute to the team's name.

Columbia earned its first ever victory as the Fireflies on April 9, 2016. In the game, three pitchers (Thomas McIlraith, Alex Palsha, and Johnny Magliozzi) combined to throw a no-hitter in a 9–0 shutout victory over the Charleston RiverDogs. The no-hitter was the Fireflies' third game. In their first ever home game, on April 14, 2016, the Fireflies defeated the Greenville Drive, 4–1, in front of 9,077 people.

In conjunction with Major League Baseball's reconfiguration of the minors in 2021, the Mets discontinued their affiliation with Columbia. On December 9, 2020, Major League Baseball announced that the Fireflies' new parent club would be the Kansas City Royals beginning with the 2021 season. They were organized into the Low-A East as the Royals' Low-A classification affiliate. In 2022, the Low-A East became known as the Carolina League, the name historically used by the regional circuit prior to the 2021 reorganization, and was reclassified as a Single-A circuit.

== Roster ==
Columbia Fireflies roster
Players		Coaches/Other
Pitchers: 13 Moises Amezquita; 37 Andy Basora; 21 Adrian Belen; 24 Michael Braswell III; 38 Grant Fontenot; 16 Jose Gutierrez; 27 Brandon Herbold; 35 Dalton Hill; 36 Carter Holton; 37 Justin LeGuernic; 22 Michael Lombardi; 23 Jesus Oliveira; 40 Yeri Perez; 28 Randy Ramnarace; 33 Jhon Reyes; 51 Darwin Rodriguez; 36 Alberto Toribio; 32 Shane Van Dam; 45 Hiro Wyatt	Catchers: 9 Brooks Bryan; 29 Gabriel Silva; 8 Jhosmmel Zue; Infielders: 1 Josh Hammond; 47 Tyson Moran; 11 Yandel Ricardo; 15 Ivan Sosa; 7 Jhonayker Ugarte; 4 JC Vanek; Outfielders: 0 Roni Cabrera; 3 Sean Gamble; 4 Daniel Lopez	Manager: 17 David Noworyta; Coaches: 18 Taylor Bloye (pitching); 27 Ramón Castro (hitting); 44 Chris Nelson (hitting); 51 Julio Pimentel (pitching); 7-day injured list; * On Kansas City Royals 40-man roster; ~ Development list; # Rehab assignment; ∞ Reserve list; ‡ Restricted list; § Suspended list; † Temporarily inactive list; Roster updated September 28, 2026; Transactions; → More rosters: MiLB • Carolina League; → Kansas City Royals minor league players

== Retired Numbers ==
14: Larry Doby 20: Frank Robinson 42: Jackie Robinson
