= Delmarva Shorebirds =

- Founded in 1991 in Sumter, South Carolina; Based in Salisbury, Maryland since 1996

Team logo	Cap insignia

Minor league affiliations
- Class: Single-A (2021–present)
- Previous classes: Class A (1991–2020)
- League: Carolina League (2021–present)
- Division: North Division
- Previous leagues: South Atlantic League (1991–2020)

Major league affiliations
- Team: Baltimore Orioles (1997–present)
- Previous teams: Montreal Expos (1995-1996); Baltimore Orioles (1993-1994); Montreal Expos (1991-1992)

Minor league titles
- League titles (2): 1997; 2000

Team data
- Name: Delmarva Shorebirds
- Previous names: Albany Polecats (1992–1995); Sumter Flyers (1991)
- Colors: Black, orange, white
- Ballpark: Arthur W. Perdue Stadium
- Previous parks: Paul Eames Sports Complex (1992-1995); Riley Park (1991)
- Owner/ Operator: 7th Inning Stretch LLC
- General manager: Chris Bitters
- Manager: Adonis Smith
- Website: milb.com/delmarva

The Delmarva Shorebirds are a Minor League Baseball team based in Salisbury, Maryland, United States. They are members of the Carolina League and the Single-A affiliate of the Baltimore Orioles. Their home games are played at Arthur W. Perdue Stadium. The Shorebirds were members of the Class A South Atlantic League (SAL) from 1996 to 2020 and the Low-A East in 2021, though this was renamed the Carolina League and reclassified as Single-A in 2022. They won two SAL championships, in 1997 and 2000. Also in 1997, the Shorebirds received Baseball America's Bob Freitas Award for Class A baseball.

== History ==
Frank Perdue's desire for a professional baseball team based in Maryland's Eastern Shore was the driving force in bringing a franchise to Salisbury. Joining the Maryland Baseball Limited Partnership, owners of the Bowie Baysox and Frederick Keys, set the concept in motion. By Autumn 1995 Maryland Baseball purchased the Albany Polecats from Richard M. Holtzman, relocated the franchise to Salisbury and renamed it the Delmarva Shorebirds. The name "Shorebirds" refers to the marine waterfowl of the Delmarva Peninsula. The team name was chosen by 7-year-old Katie Duffy of Newark, Delaware.

The Shorebirds' first-ever game at Arthur W. Perdue Stadium was a 4–2 win over the Columbus RedStixx before a crowd of 5,787 on April 17, 1996. After fulfilling its two-year Player Development Contract with the Montreal Expos, it officially became an affiliate of the Baltimore Orioles on September 26, 1996.

In 2006, 7th Inning Stretch LLC, owned by Tom Volpe, purchased the team from Comcast Spectacor, a Philadelphia sports and entertainment company.

The Shorebirds hosted the 2011 South Atlantic League "Strike Out Hunger" All-Star Game on June 21, 2011. The Shorebirds partnered with Perdue Farms, the Community Foundation of the Eastern Shore and Delmarva's three food banks: Eastern Shore Branch of the Maryland Food Bank, the Food Bank of Delaware, and the Eastern Shore Branch of the Food Bank of Southeastern Virginia; to help "Strike Out Hunger". Perdue and the Community Foundation of the Eastern Shore donated $20 to the food banks for each strike out by a Shorebirds pitcher during the Shorebirds 2011 season.

The Kyle Moore-managed Shorebirds in 2019 clinched their first postseason berth since 2005 by winning the SAL Northern Division first-half title with the minors' best midseason record at 48–21. A franchise-best 90–48 finish made them the 14th SAL team since 1980 to reach 90 wins in a regular season and the first since the Augusta GreenJackets in 2006. The season ended when the Shorebirds were swept by the Hickory Crawdads in the best-of-three SAL Northern Division Championship Series.

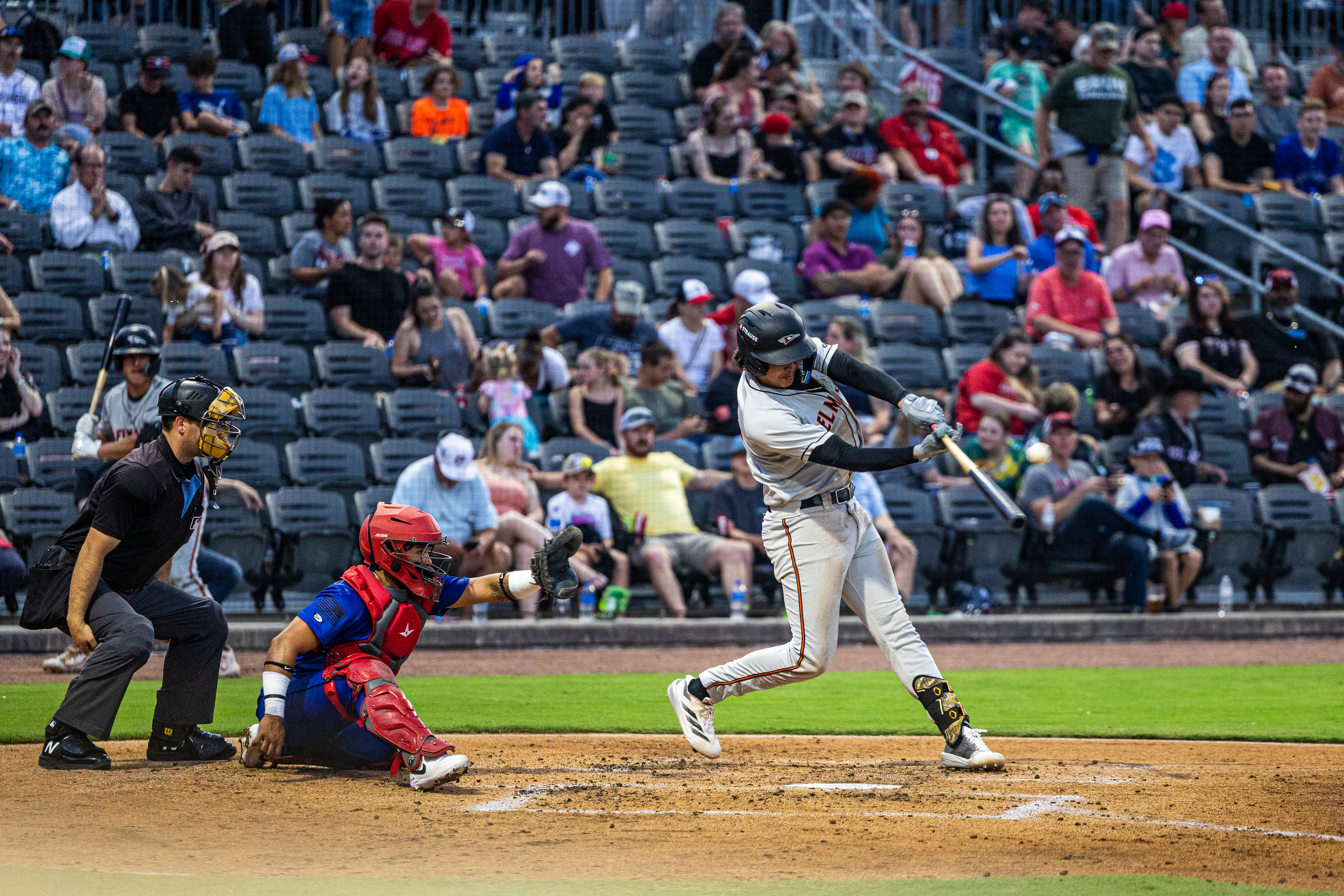
A Shorebirds player bats at Segra Stadium in 2025

In conjunction with Major League Baseball's restructuring of Minor League Baseball in 2021, the Shorebirds were organized into the Low-A East at the Low-A classification. In 2022, the Low-A East became known as the Carolina League, the name historically used by the regional circuit prior to the 2021 reorganization, and was reclassified as a Single-A circuit.

== Radio ==
The Shorebirds can be found on Fox Sports 960 AM, the Shorebirds' Flagship Station since 2005. Will DeBoer was the radio voice of the Shorebirds from 2017 to 2021, but was replaced for the 2021 season by Sam Jellinek. Mitchell Speltz is the current voice of the Shorebirds. Former announcers include Randy Scott, Bret Lasky and Brendan Gulick.

== Roster ==
Delmarva Shorebirds roster
Players	Coaches/Other
Pitchers: 34 KK Clark; 16 Holden deJong; 31 Brandon Downer; 35 Jake Dykhoff; 1 Connor Gehr; 28 Javier González; 11 Kailen Hamson; 33 Andrew Herbert; 37 Adrian Heredia; 39 Harrison Kreiling; 32 Collin McKinney; 22 Esteban Mejía; 27 Francisco Morao; 17 Dalton Neuschwander; 12 Brayan Orrantia; -- Alex Ramos; 25 Isaac Silva; 23 Braden Smith; Catchers: 20 Adriander Mejía; 40 Juan Ortega; 18 Miguel Rodríguez; 23 Andrew Tess; Infielders: 21 Luis Almeyda; 3 Félix Amparo ~; 6 Jimmy Anderson; 9 Hector Campusano; 19 Elvin Garcia; 23 Joshua Liranzo; 2 Jaiden Lo Re; 7 Jemone Nuel; 38 Carlos Sanchez; Outfielders: 24 Eric Booth Jr.; 13 Ty Head; 4 Stiven Martinez; 9 Raylin Ramos; 29 Jhomnardo Reyes	Manager: -- Adonis Smith; Coaches: 36 Casey Buckley (development); -- Aritz Garcia (fundamentals); -- Collin McBride (hitting); -- Bailey Vuylsteke (pitching); 60-day injured list: 35 Hunter Allen (full season); 38 Denton Biller; 36 J. D. Hennen (full season); 2 Cobb Hightower; -- Miguel Mesa; 34 Keeler Morfe; -- Trey Nordmann (full season); 7-day injured list; * On Baltimore Orioles 40-man roster; ~ Development list; # Rehab assignment; ∞ Reserve list; ‡ Restricted list; § Suspended list; † Temporarily inactive list; Roster updated August 19, 2026; Transactions; → More rosters: MiLB • Carolina League; → Baltimore Orioles minor league players

== Notable alumni ==
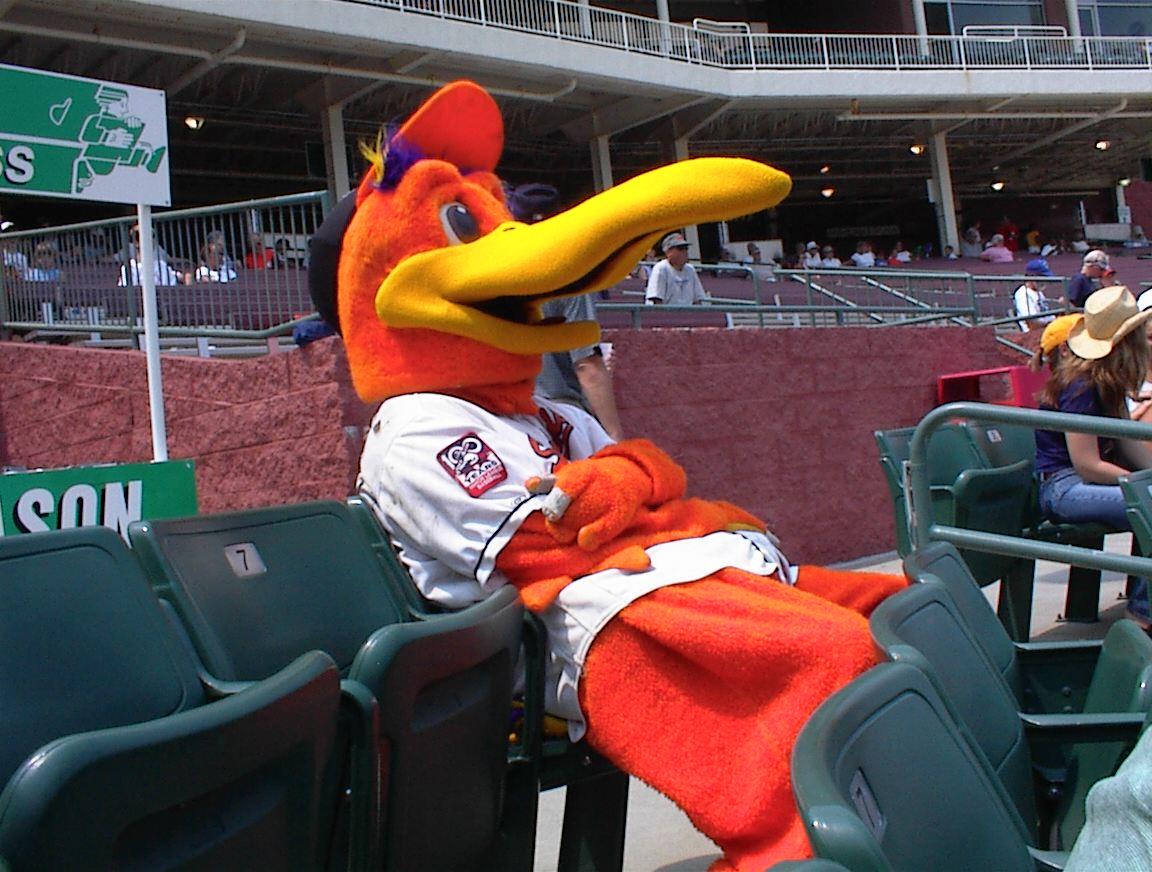
Team Mascot "Sherman the Shorebird"

- Michael Barrett (1996)
- Erik Bedard (2005)
- Mike Bordick (2001) MLB All-Star
- Zach Britton (2008) 2 x MLB All-Star
- Orlando Cabrera (1996)
- Manny Machado (2011)
- Endy Chavez (2012)
- Delino DeShields (1999)
- Mike Guerra (1938)
- Pat Hentgen (2002) 3 x MLB All-Star; 1996 AL Cy Young Award
- Ty Kelly (2010–11)
- Nick Markakis (2004) MLB All-Star
- Stu Miller (1949) 2 x MLB All-Star; 1958 NL ERA Leader
- Brian Roberts (1999, 2012) 2 x MLB All-Star
- Jayson Werth (1998) MLB All-Star
- Scott Williamson (2007) MLB All-Star; 1999 NL rookie of the Year
