= Arthur W. Perdue Stadium =

Baseball stadium in Salisbury, Maryland, US

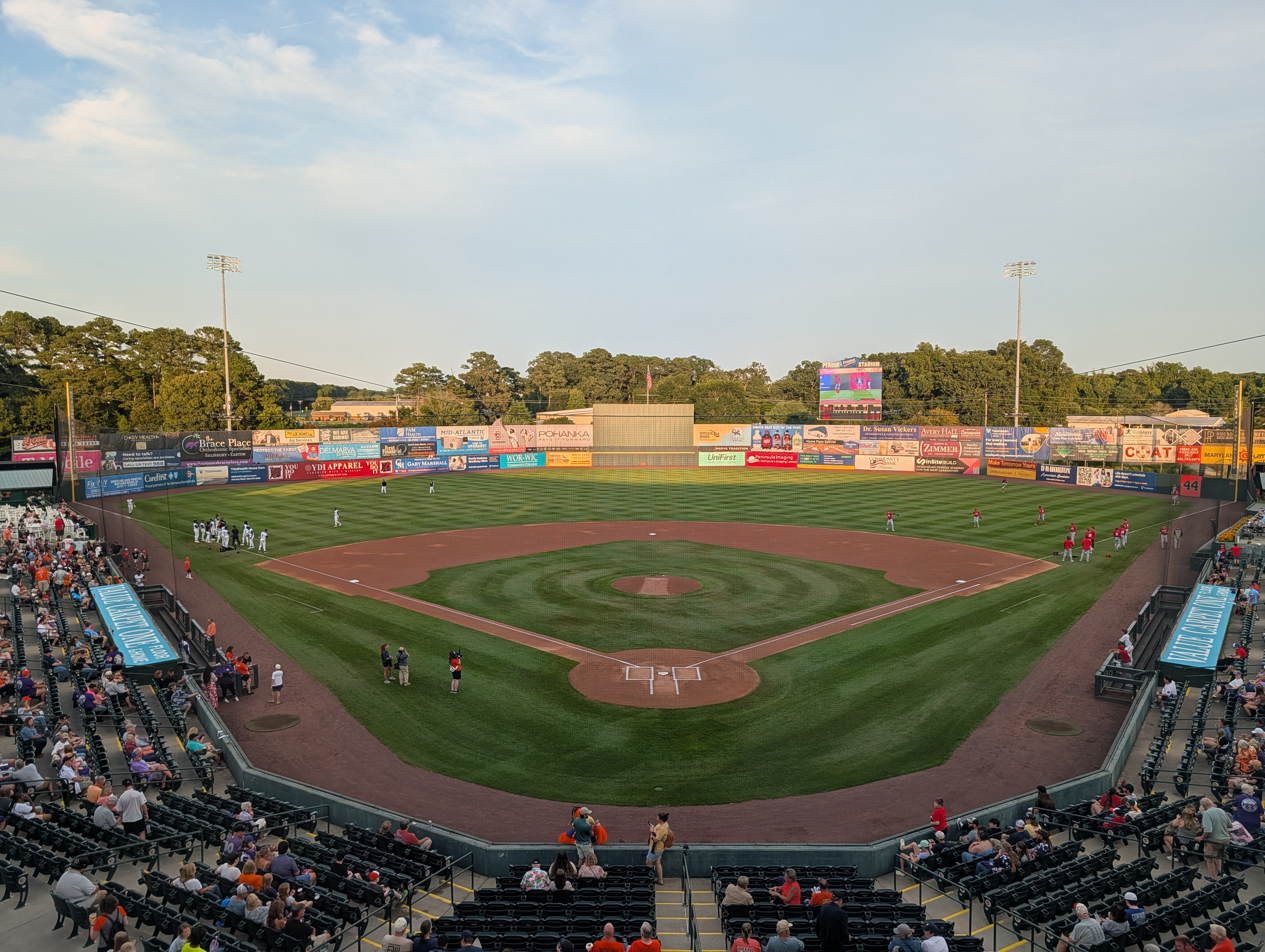
- Interior of Arthur W. Perdue Stadium

- Location within Maryland Location within the United States
- Interactive map of Arthur W. Perdue Stadium
- Location: 6400 Hobbs Road; Salisbury, MD 21804
- Coordinates: 38°22′11″N 75°31′46″W
- Owner: Wicomico County
- Operator: 7th Inning Stretch LP
- Capacity: 5,200
- Surface: Grass
- Field size: Left Field: 309 ft (94 m); Center Field: 402 ft (123 m); Right Field: 309 ft (94 m)

Construction
- Groundbreaking: August 18, 1994
- Opened: April 17, 1996
- Renovated: 2014–2019
- Cost: $11.5 million ($23.6 million in 2025 dollars)
- Architect: The Design Exchange
- Project manager: National Sports Services
- Structural engineers: Davis, Bowen & Friedel, Inc.
- General contractors: W. B. Venables & Sons, Inc.

Tenants
- Delmarva Shorebirds (SAL/Carolina League) 1996–present UMES Hawks (MEAC) 2018–2019; Delmarva Rockfish (MFB) 1998

Arthur W. Perdue Stadium is a baseball stadium in Salisbury, Maryland. It is the home of the Baltimore Orioles Carolina League affiliate Delmarva Shorebirds. Named for the founder of Perdue Farms, Arthur Perdue, it features the Eastern Shore Baseball Hall of Fame. The stadium seats 5,200 fans and opened in 1996.

As the second-largest seating venue in Salisbury, it also occasionally is used for concerts or other events. Until 2016, the larger Wicomico Youth and Civic Center had a real covenant against serving alcohol. As such, the stadium was chosen as the venue for Fernando Guerrero's middleweight title-winning boxing match in October 2009.

The University of Maryland Eastern Shore Hawks of the Mid-Eastern Athletic Conference (MEAC) played their 2018 and 2019 seasons at Perdue Stadium while Hawk Stadium in Princess Anne was renovated. Perdue Stadium hosted the Mid-Eastern Athletic Conference baseball tournament from 2015 to 2017.

In 1998, the stadium hosted the Delmarva Rockfish, a team in the single-season Maryland Fall Baseball league.

== Renovations ==
Perdue Stadium has undergone renovations, including a total field replacement, new seating, new video scoreboard, and a wraparound 360 degree deck, beginning in 2014. In June 2019 it was announced that at the beginning of August the protective netting behind home plate would be extended from the near ends of each dugout to the far ends of each dugout.

Another large-scale renovation project was completed in 2025 which, among other things, aimed to bring the stadium into alignment with Major League Baseball’s Professional Development League (PDL) standards. Fan experience was improved with the construction of a new patio area, and the installation of modern LED stadium lights, while player-centric upgrades included the construction of an on-site ~9,000 sq ft indoor performance center, updated locker rooms and training facilities, and new protected bullpens. Several additional clubhouse & field improvements meant to bring the stadium into PDL compliance were also completed.

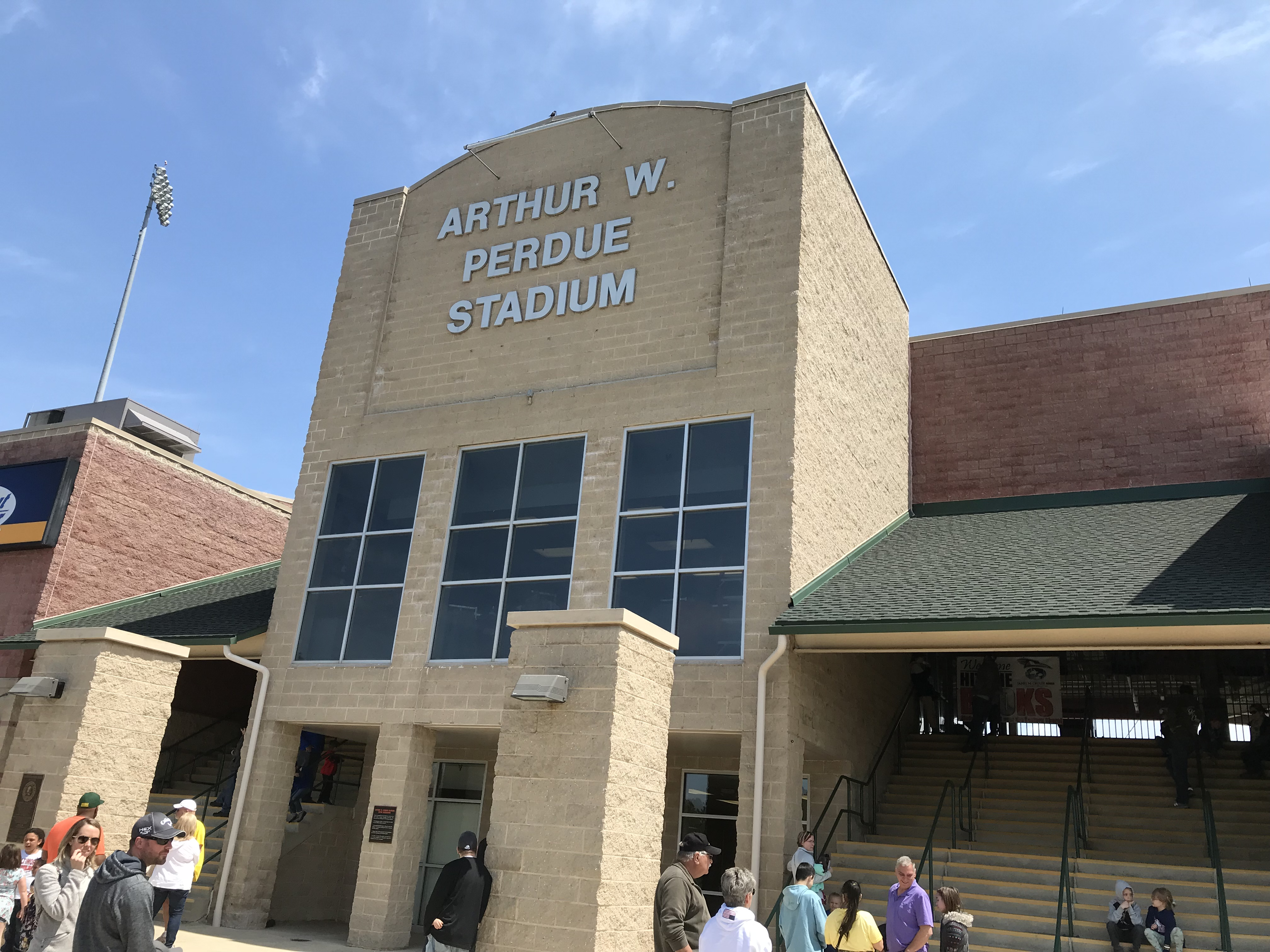
The entrance to Perdue Stadium
