= Segra Stadium =

Baseball park in Fayetteville, North Carolina

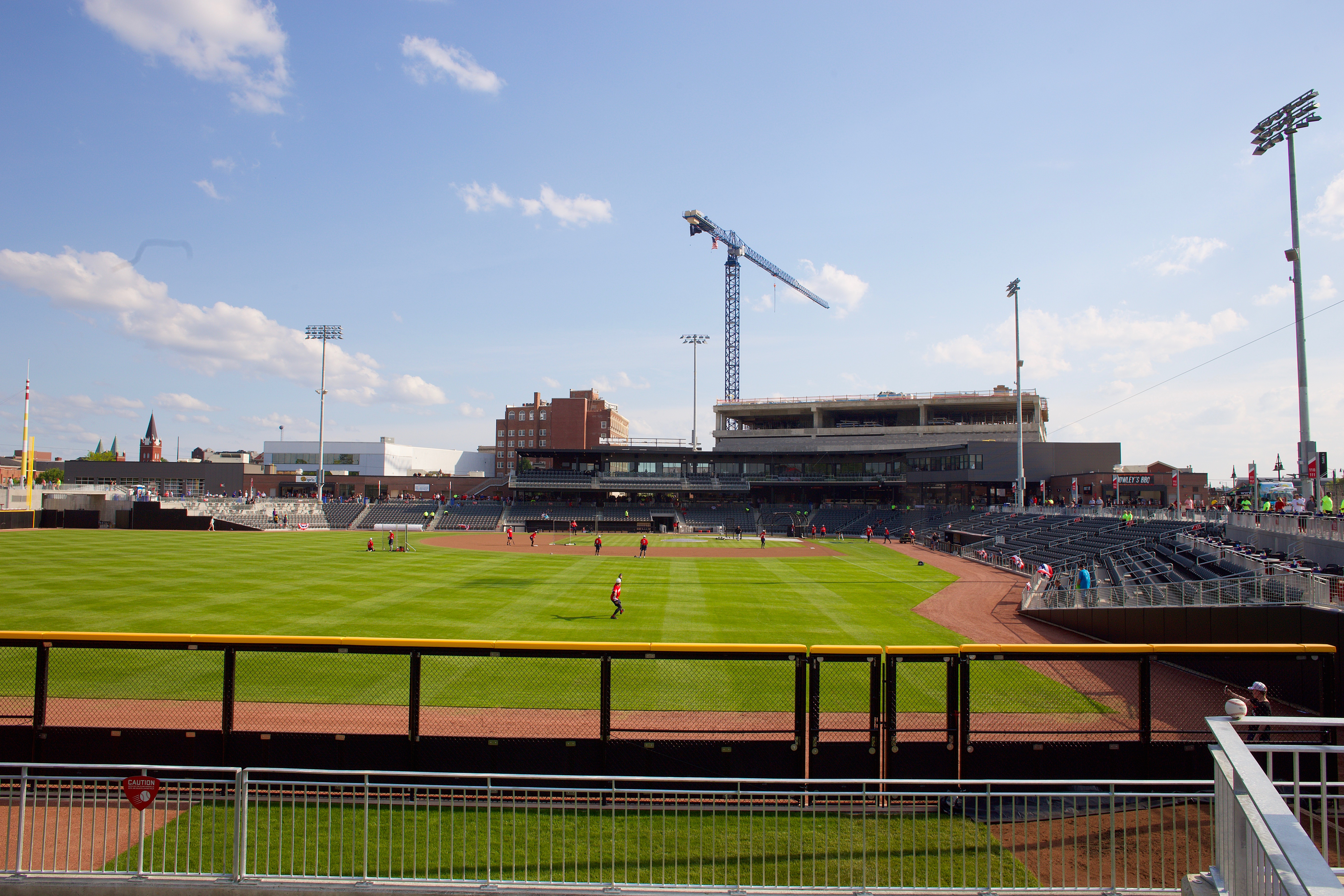
- Interactive map of Segra Stadium
- Location: 460 Hay Street; Fayetteville, North Carolina; United States
- Coordinates: 35.055914°N 78.883382°W
- Owner: City of Fayetteville
- Operator: City of Fayetteville
- Capacity: 4,600
- Surface: Grass
- Field size: Left Field: 319 ft (97 m); Left-Center Field: 372 ft (113 m); Center Field: 400 ft (120 m); Right-Center Field: 382 ft (116 m); Right Field: 330 ft (100 m)

Construction
- Groundbreaking: August 21, 2017
- Built: 2017–2019
- Opened: April 18, 2019
- Cost: $37.8 million
- Architects: Populous; SfL+a Architects
- Structural engineers: LHC Structural Engineers, PC
- Services engineers: Henderson Engineers, Inc.
- General contractor: Barton Malow

Tenant
- Fayetteville Woodpeckers (CL/Low-A East) 2019–present

Segra Stadium is a baseball park in downtown Fayetteville, North Carolina. It is the home of the Fayetteville Woodpeckers, a Minor League Baseball team playing in the Carolina League. It opened in 2019 and seats up to 4,600 people. The site is immediately surrounded by the Airborne & Special Operations Museum, Fayetteville station, and the Prince Charles Hotel. Segra Stadium is also the home of some of Fayetteville's most popular annual events, such as Pecktoberfest, Fayetteville Holiday Lights, and Eastern NC Walk to End Alzheimer's.

== History ==
Fayetteville lacked minor league baseball since the Cape Fear Crocs moved to Lakewood, New Jersey after the 2000 season. The team is now called the Jersey Shore BlueClaws, the Class A affiliate of the Philadelphia Phillies.

On August 17, 2016, the City of Fayetteville signed a memorandum of understanding with the Houston Astros of Major League Baseball to keep a Class A team club at the ballpark for 30 years. As part of the deal, Barton Malow contracted 83 percent of the construction to local and Small Disadvantaged Business Enterprise contractors.

In conjunction with the ballpark financing, Prince Charles Holdings plans to invest $15 million toward renovating the adjoining Prince Charles Hotel into apartments. The company also intends to invest an additional $60 million toward a hotel, 150 residential units, 10,000 sq ft (930 m^{2}) of retail space, and a parking garage at the same stadium site.

Groundbreaking took place on August 21, 2017. On February 7, 2019, the team announced a naming rights agreement with Segra, an independent fiber bandwidth company, to call the facility Segra Stadium. A ribbon cutting and tours were held on April 13.

The ballpark's first game was held on April 18, 2019, between the Woodpeckers and the Carolina Mudcats. Carolina defeated Fayetteville, 7–5, before a sellout crowd of 6,202 people. Fayetteville starting pitcher Enoli Paredes recorded the stadium's first strikeouts as he retired the first three Mudcats batters on strikes to open the game. The first hit was a single in the bottom of the first inning off the bat of Fayetteville's Bryan De La Cruz. The first home run was hit in the top of the second inning by Carolina's Payton Henry.

== Other uses ==
Besides being the home field for the Astros affiliate, the ballpark hosted the Big South Tournament as a neutral site May 21–25, 2019, and plans to do so again in 2021. The 2020 tournament at Segra Stadium was cancelled due to the coronavirus pandemic.

From February 28 to March 1, 2020, Segra Stadium hosted the Armed Forces Invitational Baseball Tournament between Army West Point Black Knights, the Air Force Academy Falcons, and Campbell University Fighting Camels. In the round-robin style tournament, each team played a two-game series with the others over the course of three days. All three teams split both series, going 2–2 on the weekend.

Segra Stadium is set to host the Second Annual Jackie Robinson Showcase on May 5, 2023. This is a baseball tournament showcasing six high school baseball teams within the Fayetteville area. The tournament highlights the local talent while giving athletes a chance to play under the big lights at Segra Stadium.
