= Atrium Health Ballpark =

Ballpark in Kannapolis, NC

- Location in North Carolina Location in the United States
- Interactive map of Atrium Health Ballpark
- Location: Chestnut Ave and West B Street; Kannapolis, NC 28083
- Coordinates: 35°29′57″N 80°37′36″W
- Owner: City of Kannapolis
- Operator: Temerity Baseball
- Capacity: 4,930 (3,218 seated)
- Surface: Natural Grass

Construction
- Groundbreaking: October 30, 2018
- Opened: May 15, 2020 (as public park)
- Cost: $52 Million
- Architect: Populous
- Structural engineer: Jezerinac Group
- General contractor: Barton Malow

Tenant
- Kannapolis Cannon Ballers (Carolina League) 2021–present

Website
- www.milb.com/kannapolis/ballpark/atriumhealthballpark

Atrium Health Ballpark is a baseball stadium in Kannapolis, North Carolina. As of March 2021, it is the home of the Kannapolis Cannon Ballers, the Carolina League affiliate of the Chicago White Sox, replacing Intimidators Stadium. The stadium is located adjacent to the North Carolina Research Campus and is the centerpiece of a $100 million redevelopment of downtown Kannapolis.

The ballpark hosts amateur baseball, community events and concerts in addition to the Cannon Ballers. A ten-year naming rights agreement with Atrium Health was announced on February 5, 2020.

With the 2020 minor league baseball season canceled due to the COVID-19 pandemic, the ballpark opened to fans in early May as a public park, following COVID-19 protocols.
