= Prisma Health Park =

Baseball park in Columbia, South Carolina

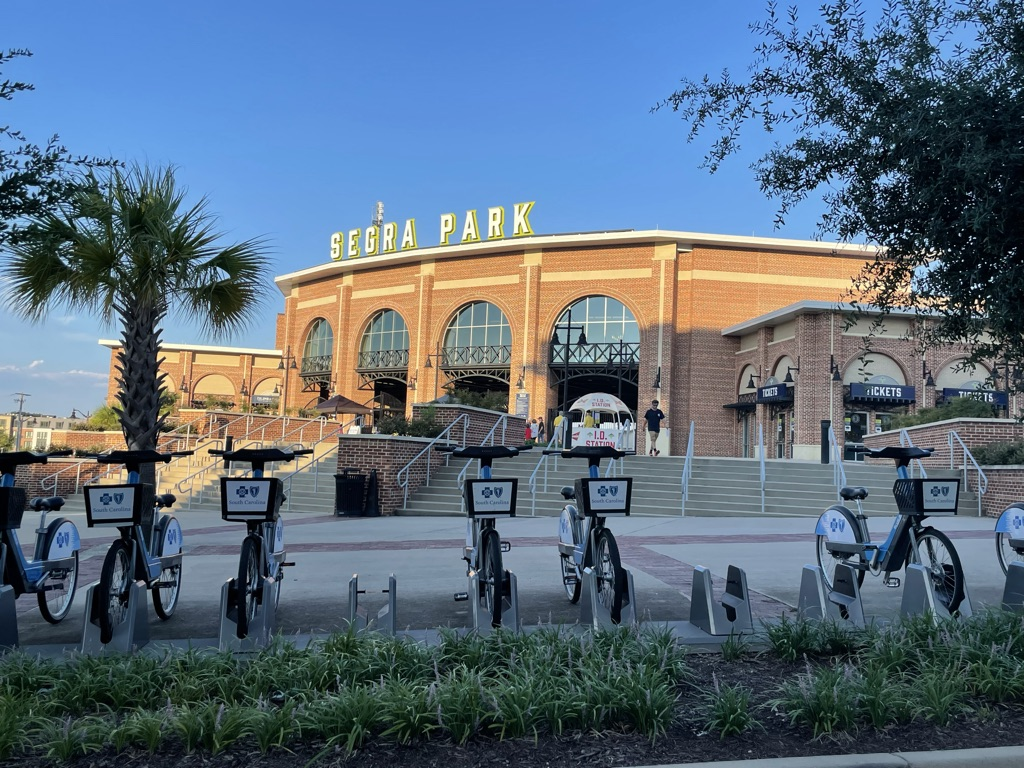

- Location within South Carolina Location within the United States
- Interactive map of Prisma Health Park
- Former names: Segra Park (2018–2025); Spirit Communications Park (2016–2018)
- Address: 1640 Freed Street; Columbia, South Carolina
- Coordinates: 34.017417°N 81.031397°W
- Owner: City of Columbia
- Operator: Hardball Capital
- Capacity: 9,077
- Surface: Grass
- Field size: Left Field: 319 ft (97 m); Left-Center Field: 372 ft (113 m); Center Field: 400 ft (120 m); Right-Center Field: 382 ft (116 m); Right Field: 330 ft (100 m)

Construction
- Groundbreaking: January 6, 2015
- Opened: April 14, 2016
- Cost: $37 million
- Architect: Populous
- Structural engineer: Walter P Moore
- Services engineers: Henderson Engineers, Inc.
- General contractors: CCEB Venue Partners (Consisting of Barton Malow, Contract Construction, Construction Dynamics, and EnviroAg Sciences)

Tenant
- Columbia Fireflies (SAL/Low-A East/Carolina League) 2016–present

Prisma Health Park is a baseball park in Columbia, South Carolina. It is home to the Columbia Fireflies, a Minor League Baseball team in the Carolina League. It opened in 2016 and can seat up to 9,077 people.

== Background ==
Columbia was without minor league baseball since the Capital City Bombers relocated to Greenville in 2004. Plans were approved in 2014 to build a new stadium to attract a Minor League Baseball team, with Spirit Communications, a local telecommunications company, buying the naming rights.

Developers broke ground on Spirit Communications Park on January 6, 2015. Architectural firm Populous built the stadium, with an estimated 8,500 capacity, on a budget of $37 million, with $30 million coming from public funds, $7 million from the team. The Savannah Sand Gnats of the Class A South Atlantic League announced in May 2015 that they would move to Columbia for the 2016 season, and be known as the Columbia Fireflies. Their first game at Spirit Communications Park, on April 14, 2016, was a 4–1 victory over the Greenville Drive attended by 9,077 people.

In its first season, Ballpark Digest named Spirit Communications Park it's 2016 Ballpark of the Year. It's the first time that a stadium has received the honor in its first year since Fluor Field at the West End, home of the Greenville Drive, did in 2006.

On September 7, 2018, the ballpark hosted the United Music Festival hip hop concert with Ludacris, Flo Rida, Nelly, and Ying Yang Twins.

Originally known as Spirit Communications Park, the facility was renamed Segra Park in January 2019 following the merger of Spirit Communications and Lumos Networks Corp into Segra.
