= List of Single-A baseball stadiums =

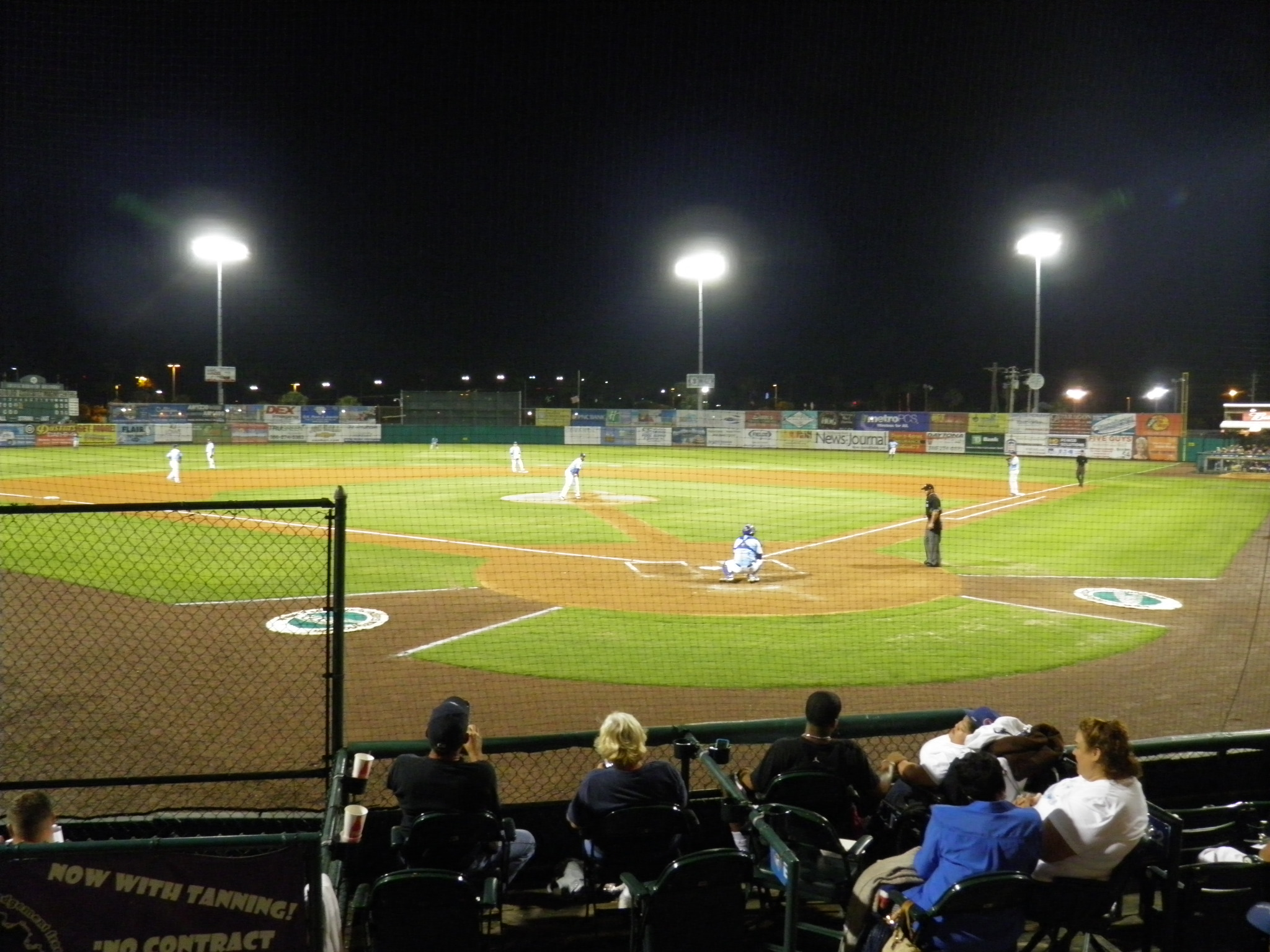
Jackie Robinson Ballpark, the oldest stadium in Single-A, opened in 1914. It is the home of the FSL's Daytona Tortugas.

There are 29 stadiums in use by Single-A Minor League Baseball teams. The California League uses eight stadiums, the Carolina League uses twelve, and the Florida State League (FSL) uses nine. The oldest stadium is Jackie Robinson Ballpark (1914) in Daytona Beach, Florida, home of the FSL's Daytona Tortugas. The newest stadiums for the 2026 season are Wilson Ballpark and ONT Field, the respective homes of the Carolina League's Wilson Warbirds in Wilson, North Carolina, and the California League's Ontario Tower Buzzers in Ontario, California. One stadium was built in each of the 1910s and 1920s, three in the 1940s, one in each of the 1960s and 1980s, twelve in the 1990s, three in each of the 2000s and 2010s, and four in the 2020s. The highest seating capacity is 11,026 at George M. Steinbrenner Field in Tampa, Florida, where the FSL's Tampa Tarpons play. The lowest capacity is 2,468 at Valley Strong Ballpark in Visalia, California, where the California League's Visalia Rawhide play.

== Stadiums ==
=== California League ===
| Name | Team | City in California | Opened | Capacity | Ref. |
|---|---|---|---|---|---|
| Chukchansi Park | Fresno Grizzlies | Fresno | 2002 | 10,650 | |
| ONT Field | Ontario Tower Buzzers | Ontario | 2026 | 6,500 | |
| Excite Ballpark | San Jose Giants | San Jose | 1942 | 4,200 | |
| Banner Island Ballpark | Stockton Ports | Stockton | 2005 | 5,300 | |
| San Manuel Stadium | Inland Empire 66ers | San Bernardino | 1996 | 8,000 | |
| Lake Elsinore Diamond | Lake Elsinore Storm | Lake Elsinore | 1994 | 7,866 | |
| Morongo Field | Rancho Cucamonga Quakes | Rancho Cucamonga | 1993 | 6,200 | |
| Valley Strong Ballpark | Visalia Rawhide | Visalia | 1946 | 2,468 | |

=== Carolina League ===
| Name | Team | City | State | Opened | Capacity | Ref. |
|---|---|---|---|---|---|---|
| Arthur W. Perdue Stadium | Delmarva Shorebirds | Salisbury | Maryland | 1996 | 5,200 | |
| Virginia Credit Union Stadium | Fredericksburg Nationals | Fredericksburg | Virginia | 2021 | 5,000 | |
| Bank of the James Stadium | Hill City Howlers | Lynchburg | Virginia | 1940 | 4,000 | |
| Salem Memorial Ballpark | Salem RidgeYaks | Salem | Virginia | 1995 | 6,300 | |
| Wilson Ballpark | Wilson Warbirds | Wilson | North Carolina | 2026 | 3,500 | |
| L. P. Frans Stadium | Hickory Crawdads | Hickory | North Carolina | 1993 | 5,062 | |
| Segra Stadium | Fayetteville Woodpeckers | Fayetteville | North Carolina | 2019 | 4,786 | |
| Atrium Health Ballpark | Kannapolis Cannon Ballers | Kannapolis | North Carolina | 2021 | 4,930 | |
| SRP Park | Augusta GreenJackets | North Augusta | South Carolina | 2018 | 4,000 | |
| Joseph P. Riley Jr. Park | Charleston RiverDogs | Charleston | South Carolina | 1997 | 6,000 | |
| Prisma Health Park | Columbia Fireflies | Columbia | South Carolina | 2016 | 7,501 | |
| Pelicans Ballpark | Myrtle Beach Pelicans | Myrtle Beach | South Carolina | 1999 | 4,875 | |

=== Florida State League ===
| Name | Team | City in Florida | Opened | Capacity | Ref. |
|---|---|---|---|---|---|
| Jackie Robinson Ballpark | Daytona Tortugas | Daytona Beach | 1914 | 4,200 | |
| Roger Dean Chevrolet Stadium | Jupiter Hammerheads, Palm Beach Cardinals | Jupiter | 1998 | 6,871 | |
| Clover Park | St. Lucie Mets | Port St. Lucie | 1988 | 7,160 | |
| LECOM Park | Bradenton Marauders | Bradenton | 1923 | 8,500 | |
| BayCare Ballpark | Clearwater Threshers | Clearwater | 2004 | 8,500 | |
| TD Ballpark | Dunedin Blue Jays | Dunedin | 1990 | 8,500 | |
| Hammond Stadium | Fort Myers Mighty Mussels | Fort Myers | 1991 | 9,300 | |
| Publix Field at Joker Marchant Stadium | Lakeland Flying Tigers | Lakeland | 1966 | 8,500 | |
| George M. Steinbrenner Field | Tampa Tarpons | Tampa | 1996 | 11,026 | |

== Map ==
Current Single-A stadium locations:
- California League
- Carolina League
- Florida State League

== Gallery ==
=== California League ===
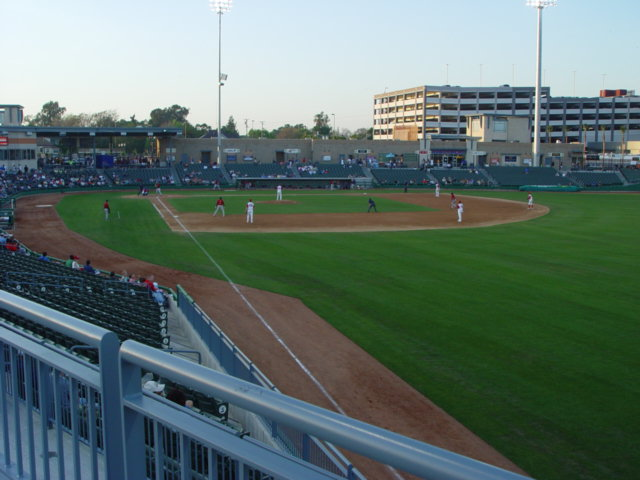
Banner Island Ballpark (Stockton Ports)

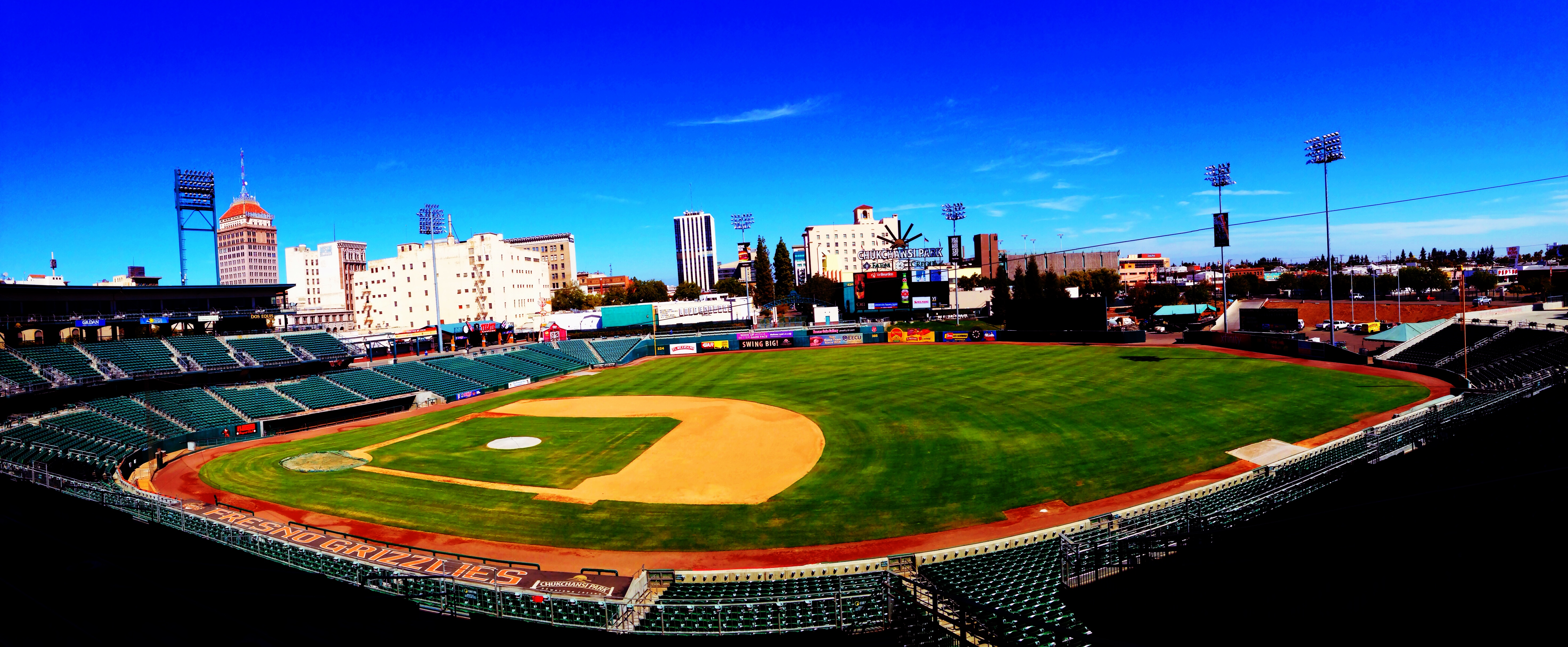
Chukchansi Park (Fresno Grizzlies)

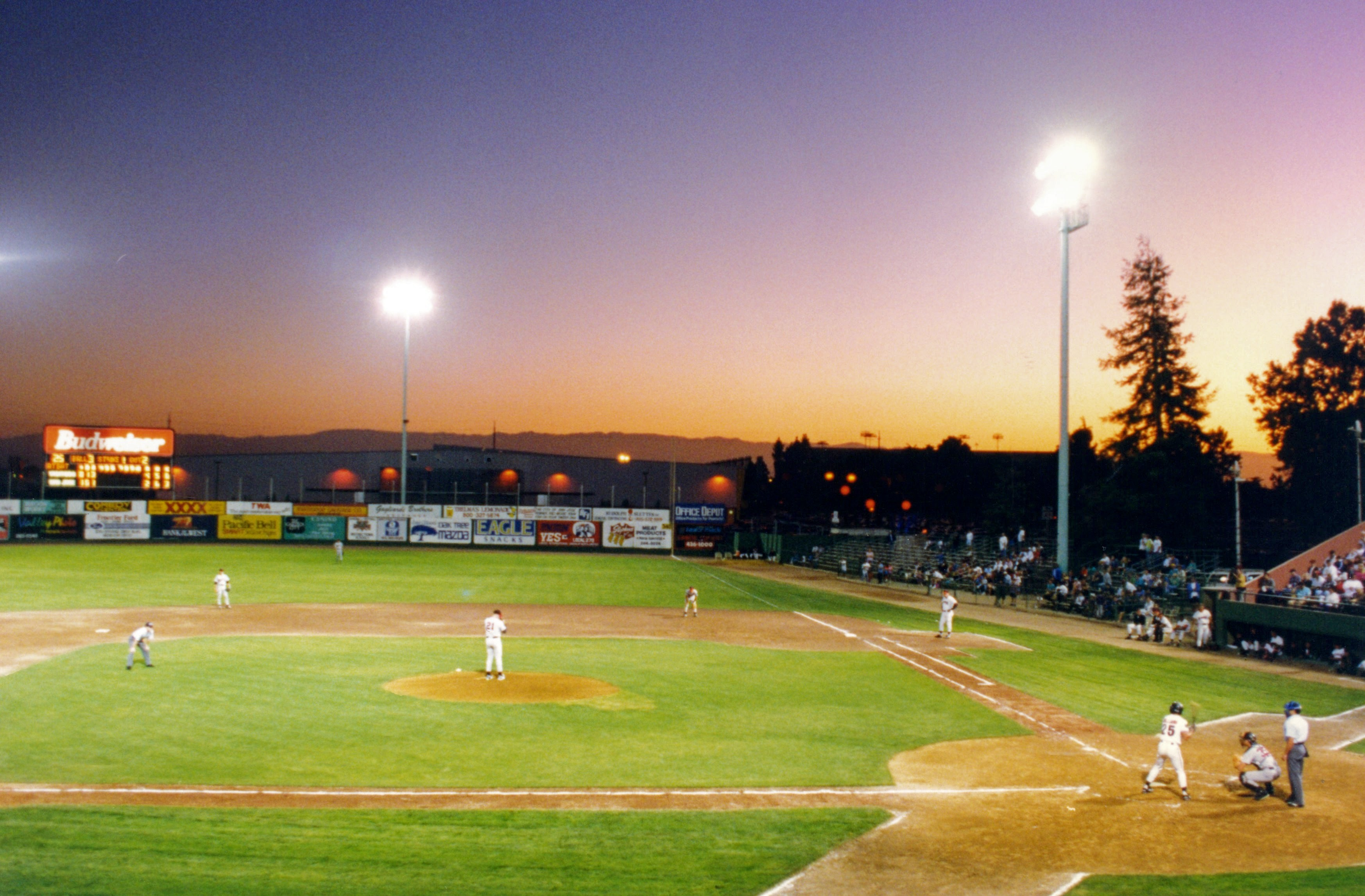
Excite Ballpark (San Jose Giants)

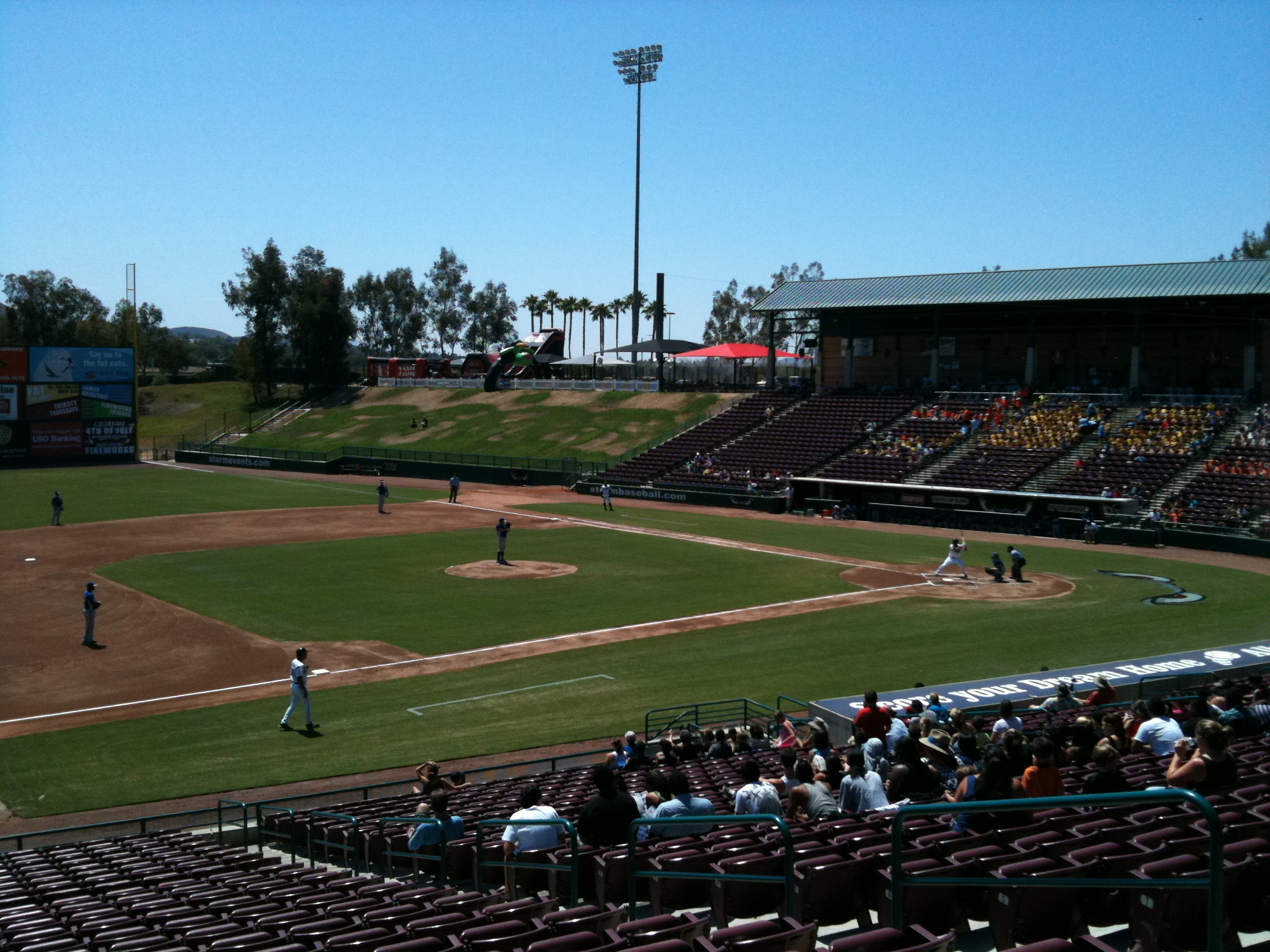
Lake Elsinore Diamond (Lake Elsinore Storm)

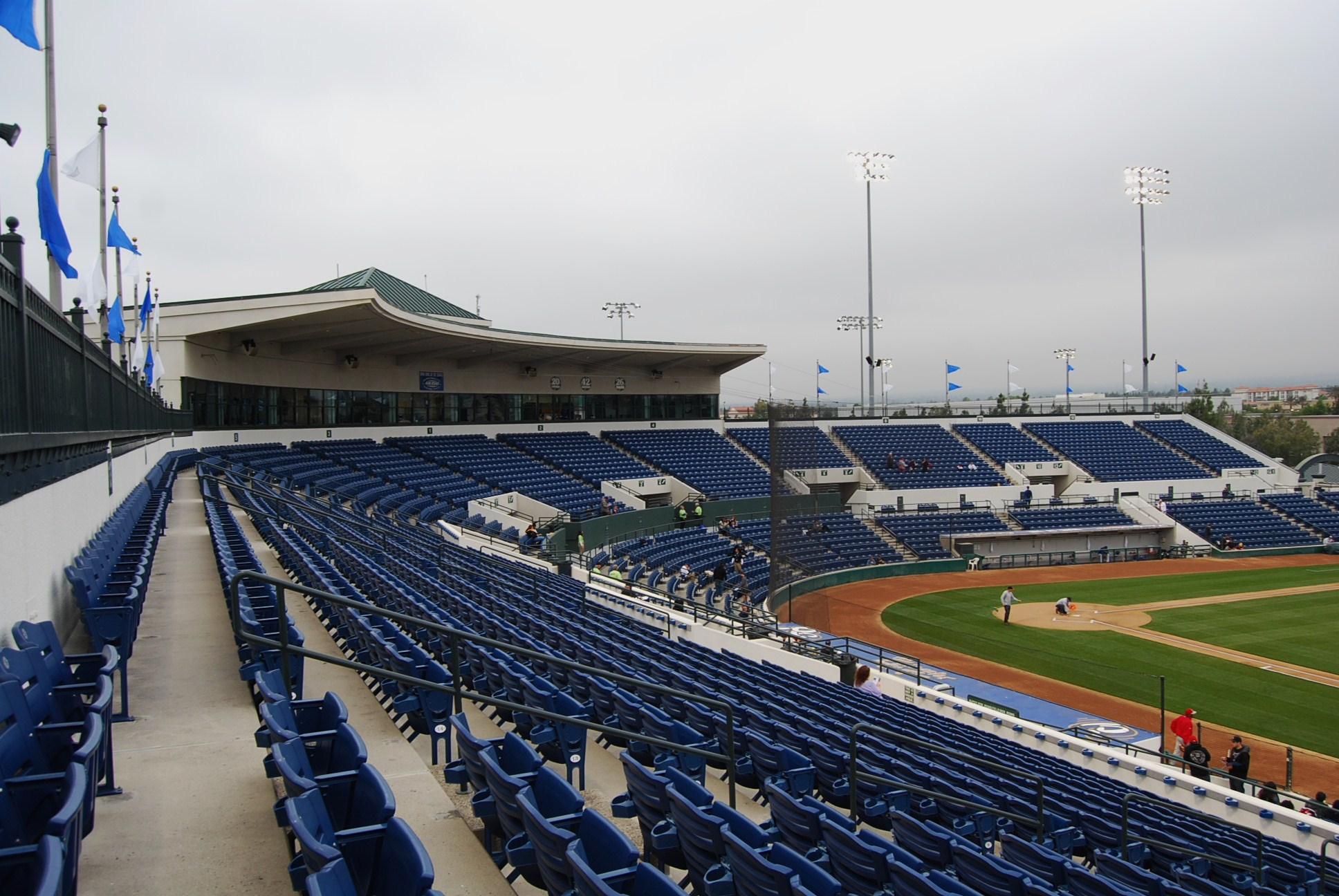
Morongo Field (Rancho Cucamonga Quakes)

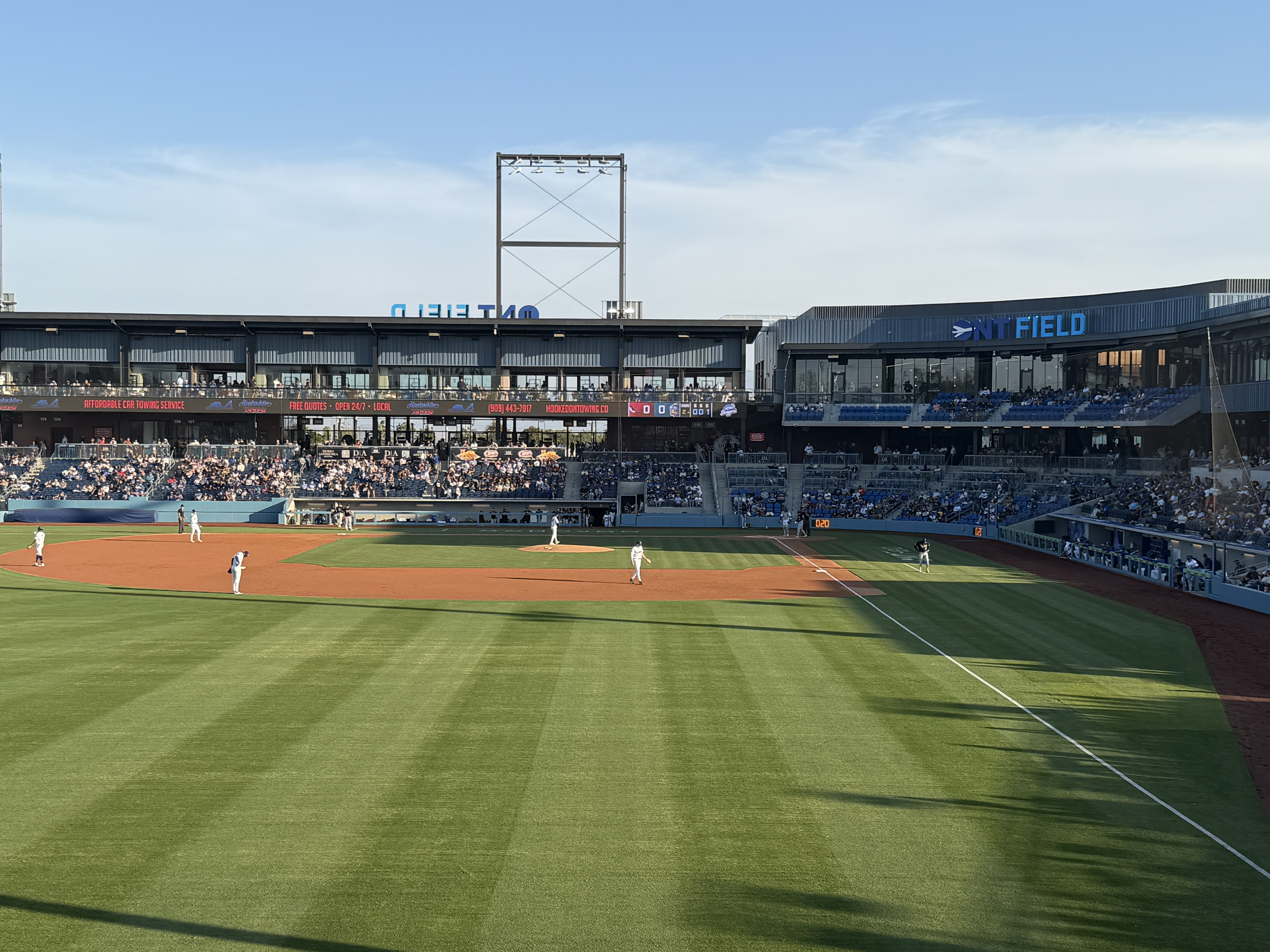
ONT Field (Ontario Tower Buzzers)

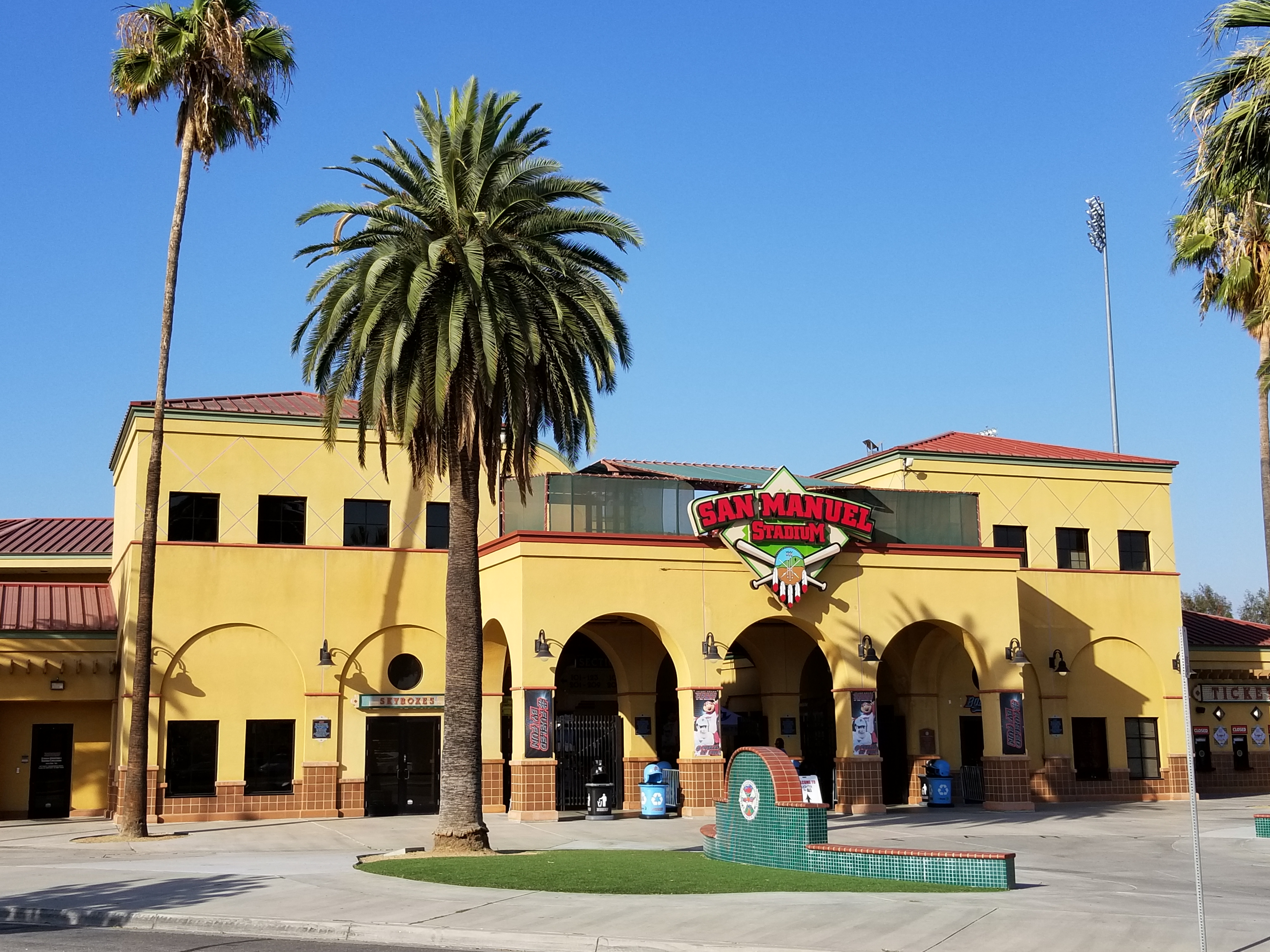
San Manuel Stadium (Inland Empire 66ers)

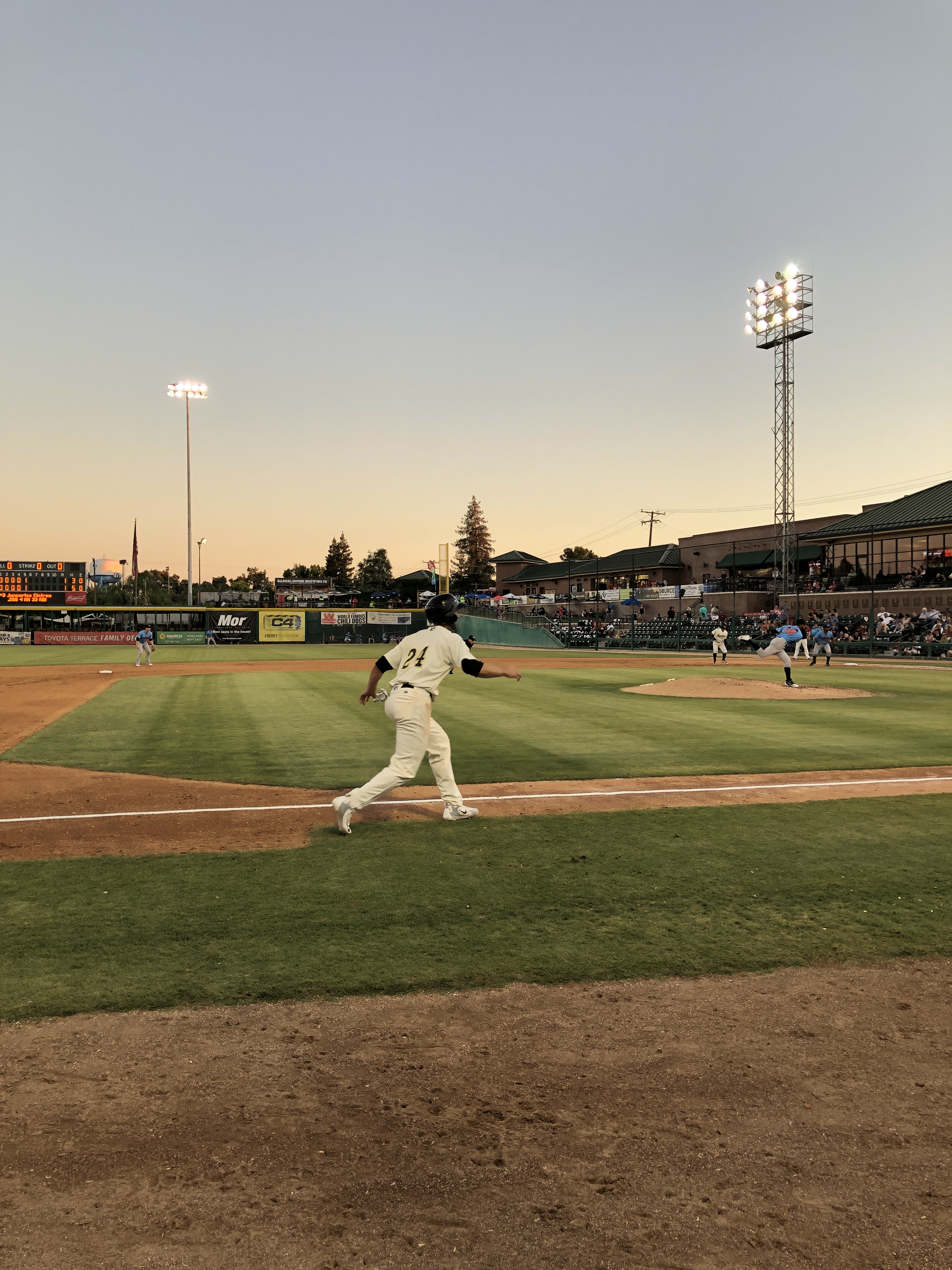
Valley Strong Ballpark (Visalia Rawhide)

=== Carolina League ===
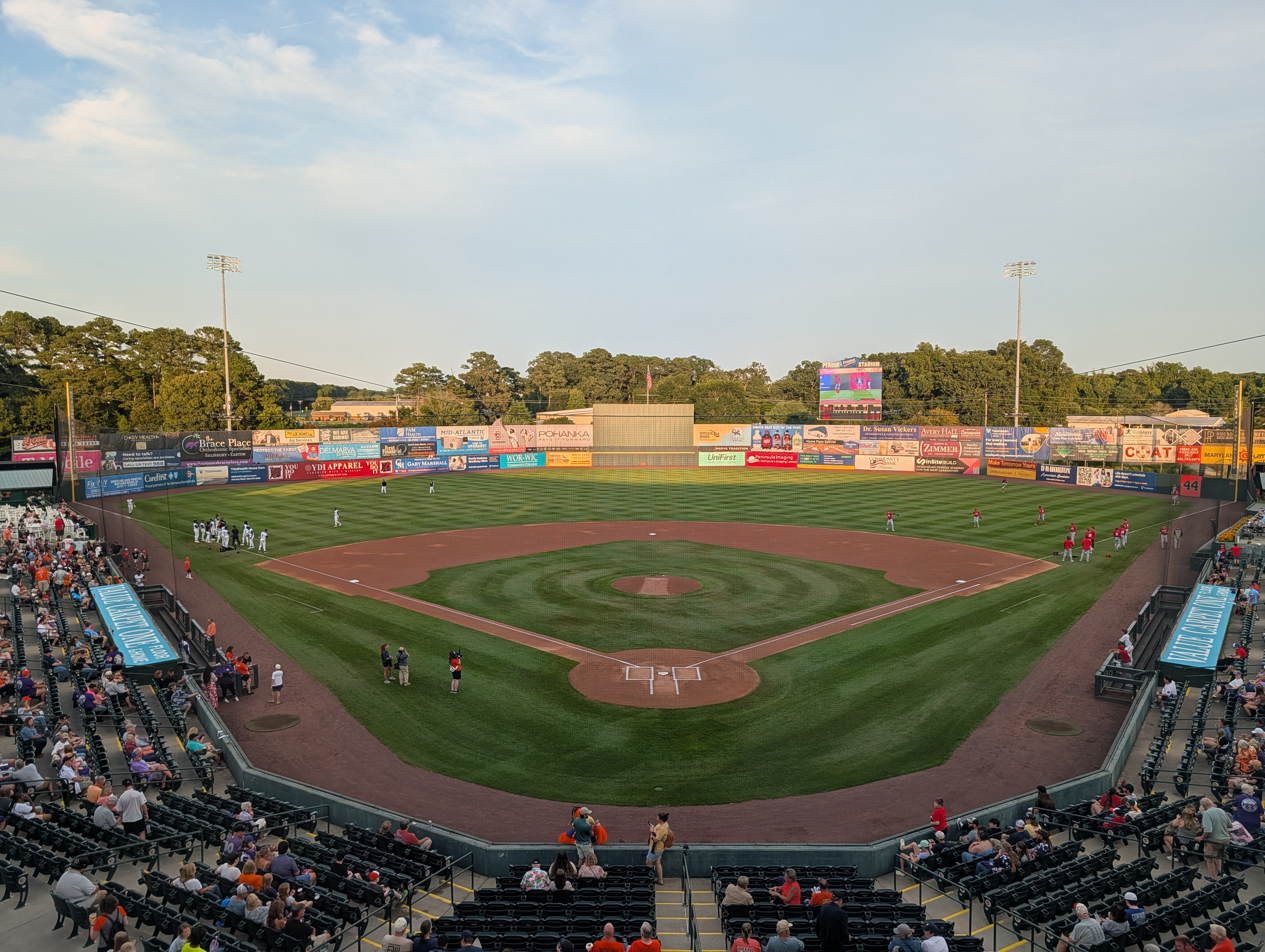
Arthur W. Perdue Stadium (Delmarva Shorebirds)

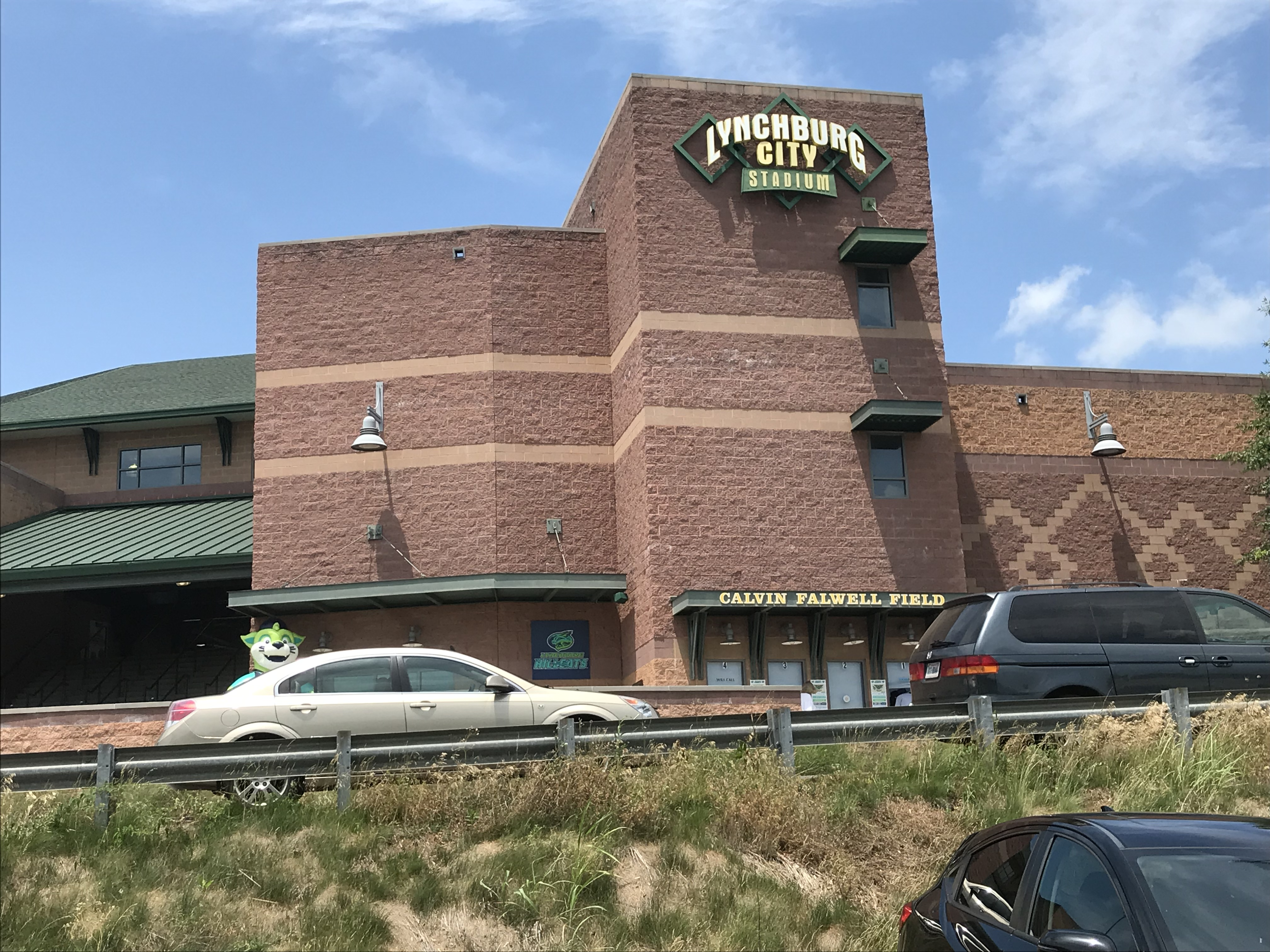
Bank of the James Stadium (Hill City Howlers)

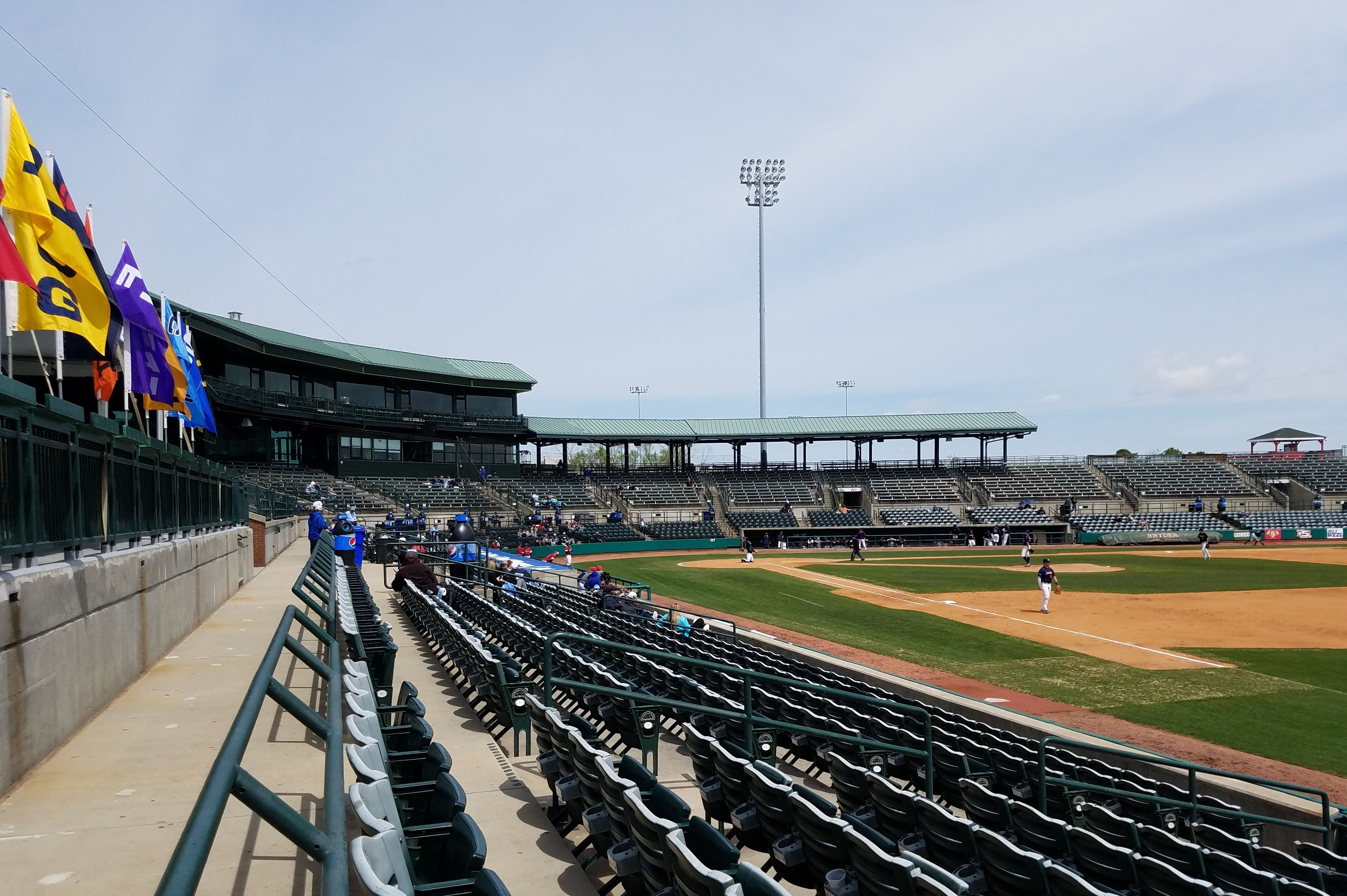
Joseph P. Riley Jr. Park (Charleston RiverDogs)

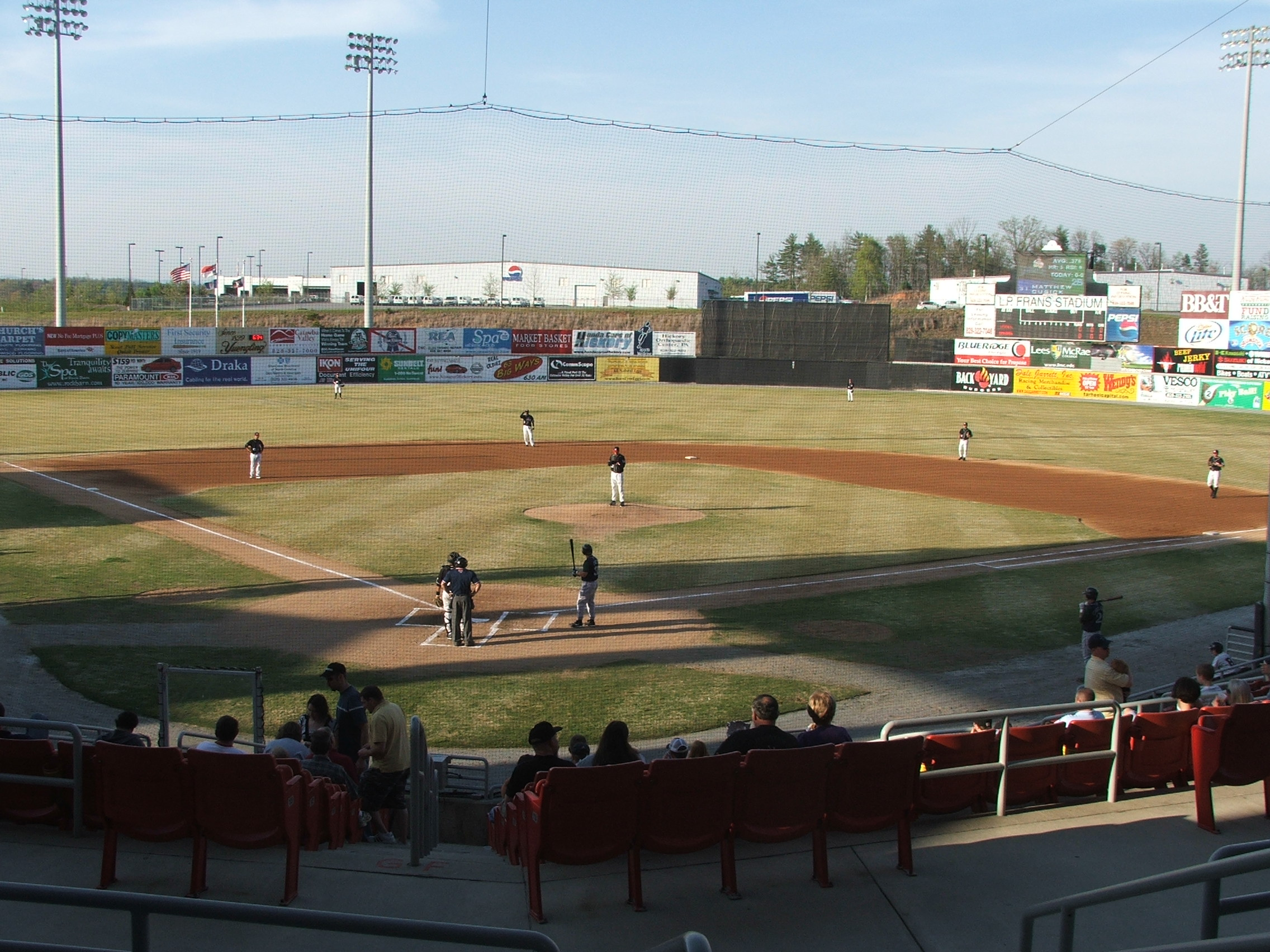
L. P. Frans Stadium (Hickory Crawdads)

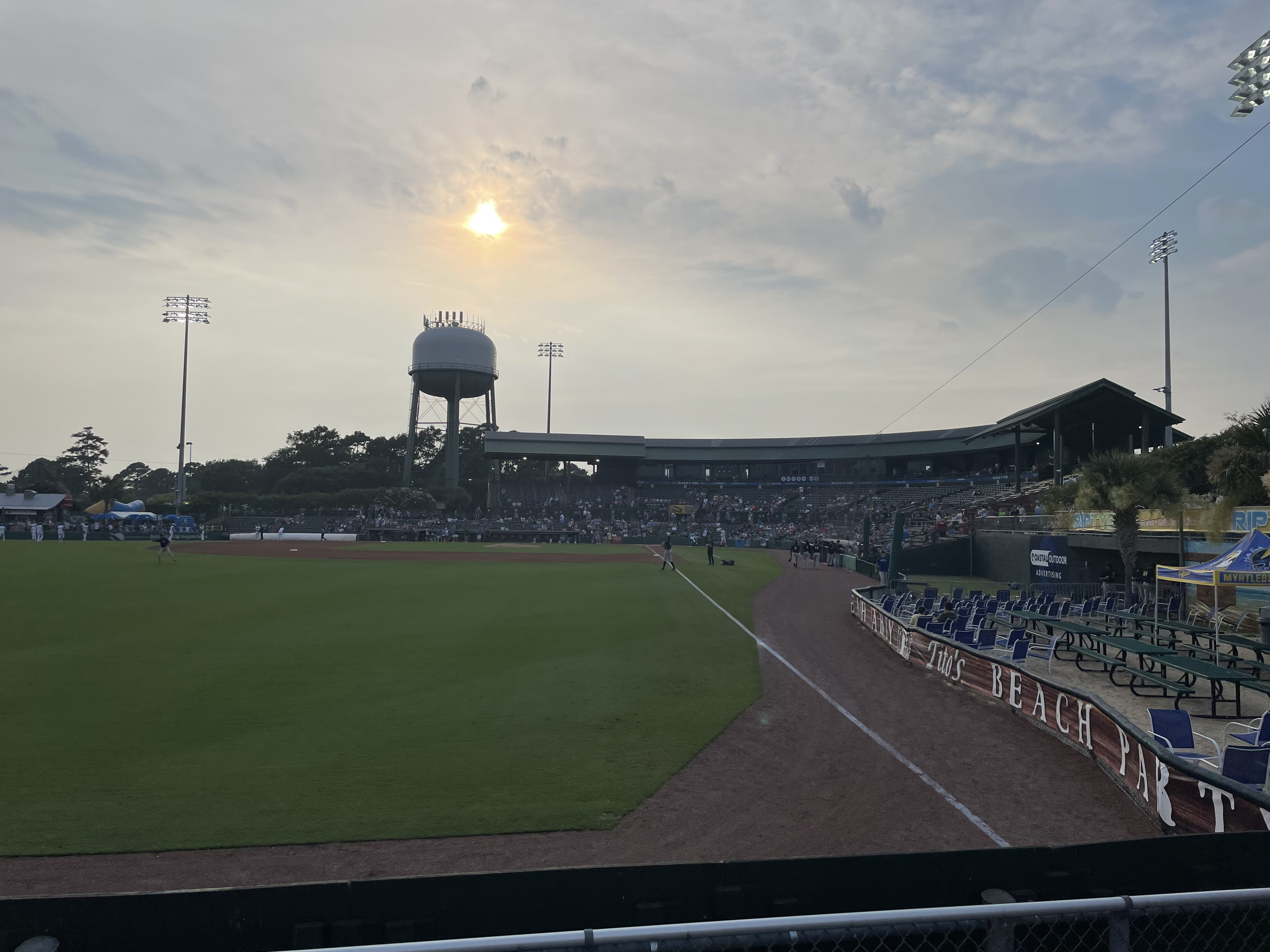
Pelicans Ballpark (Myrtle Beach Pelicans)

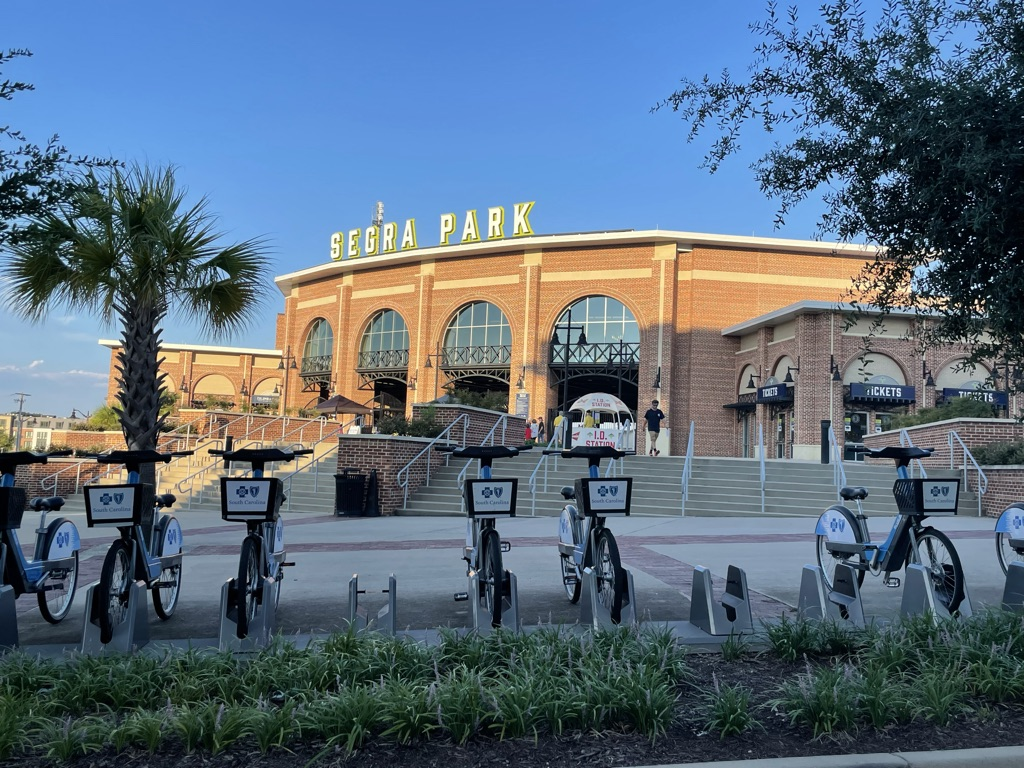
Prisma Health Park (Columbia Fireflies)

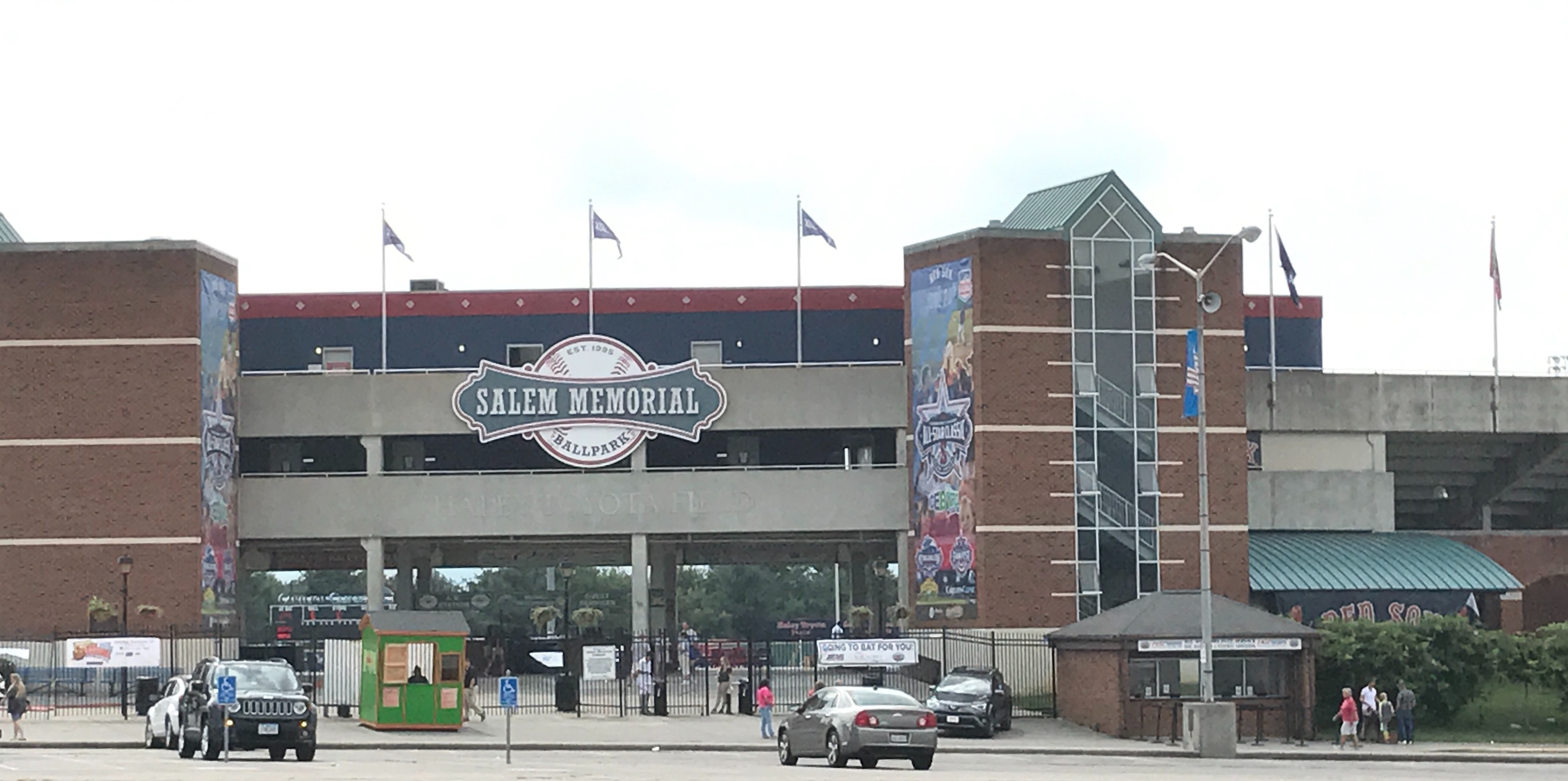
Salem Memorial Ballpark (Salem RidgeYaks)

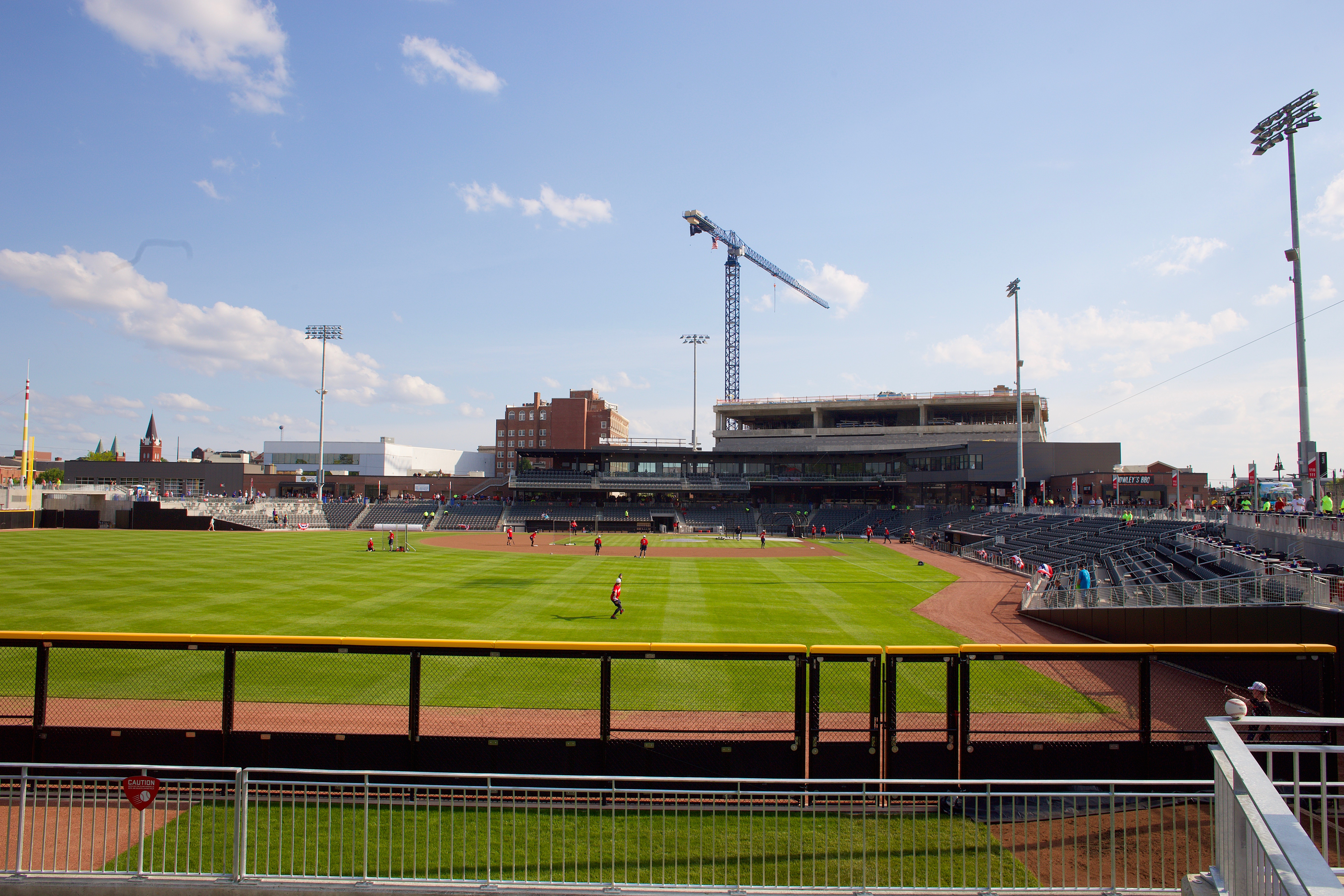
Segra Stadium (Fayetteville Woodpeckers)

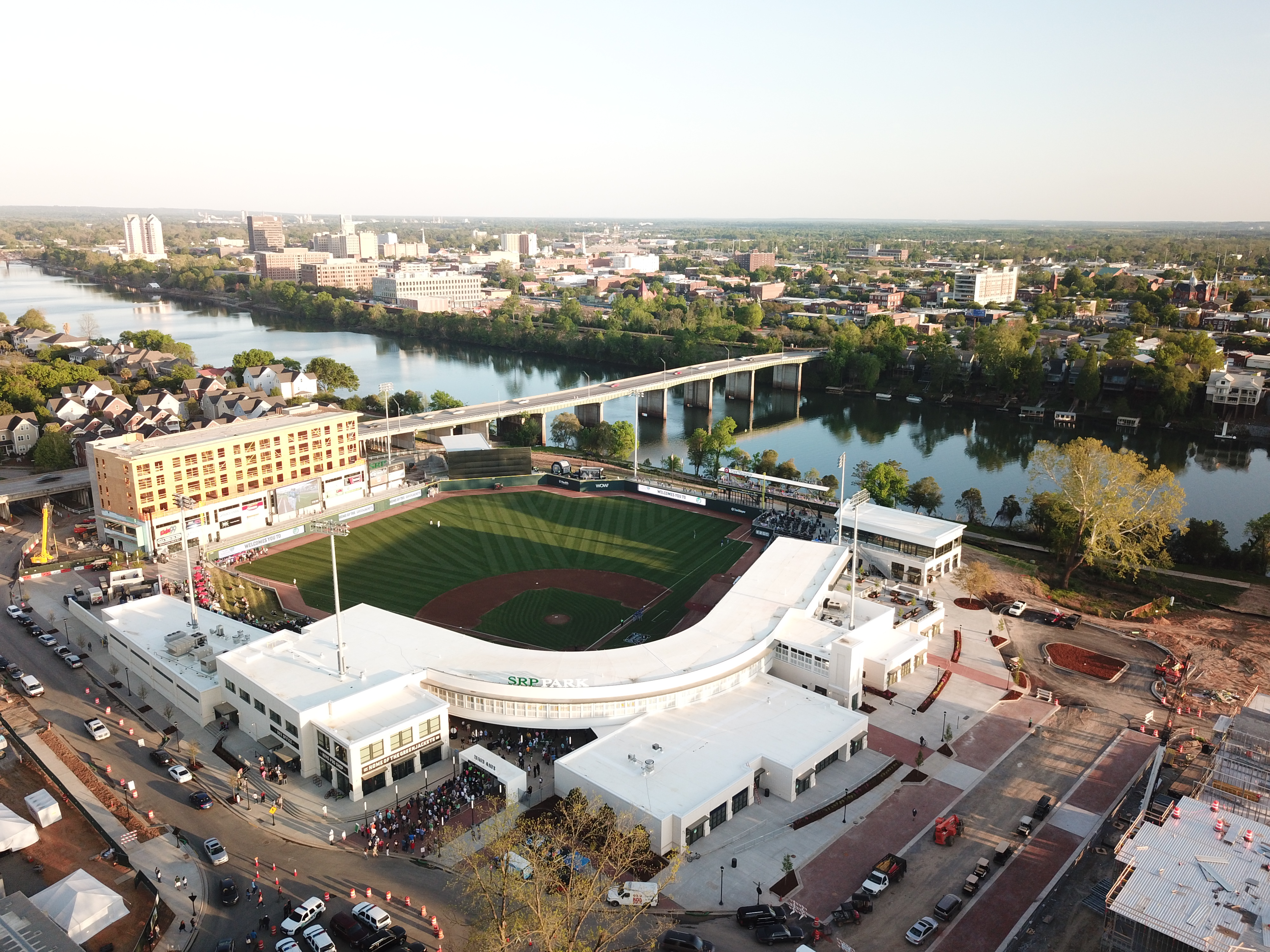
SRP Park (Augusta GreenJackets)

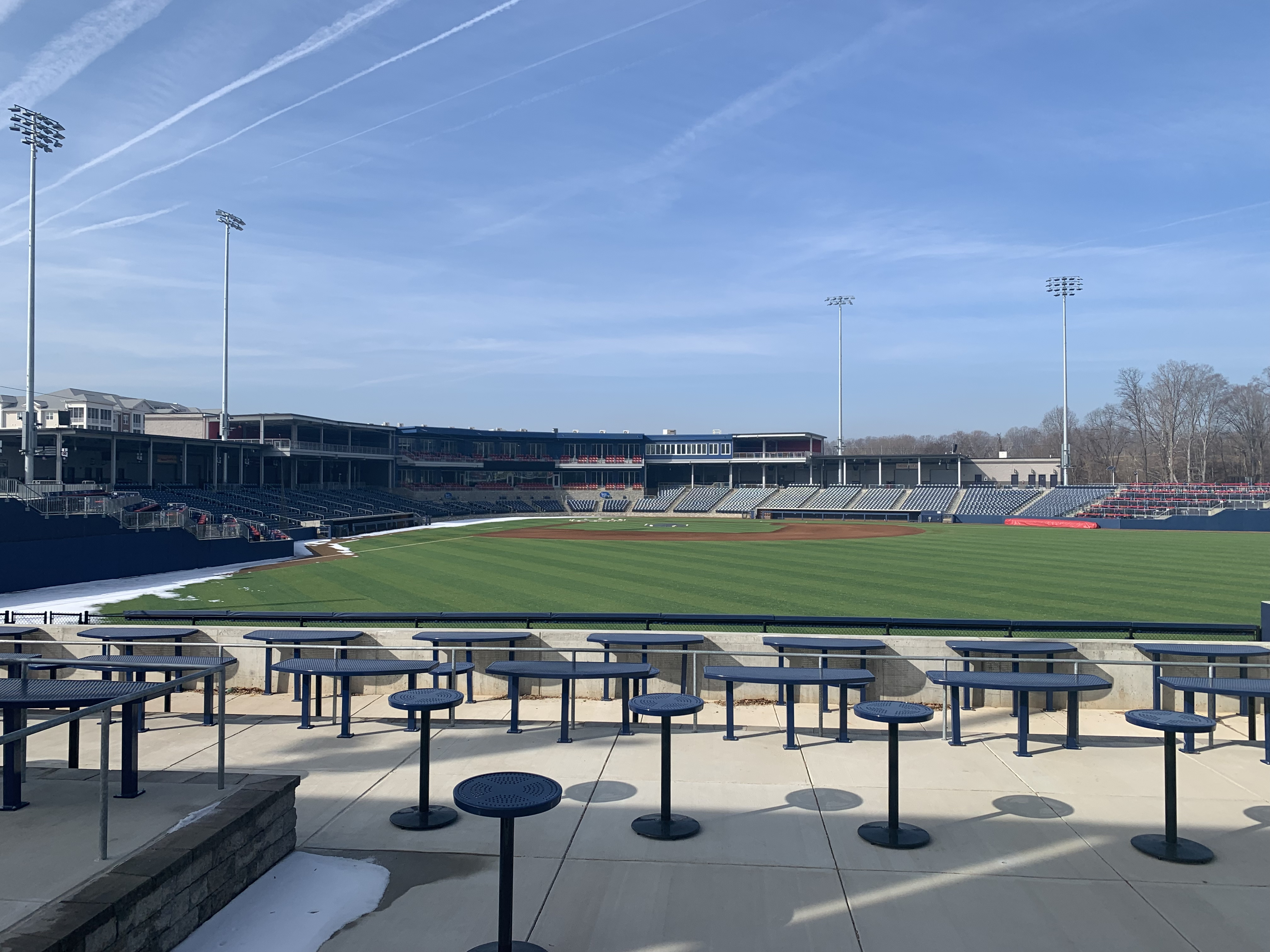
Virginia Credit Union Stadium (Fredericksburg Nationals)

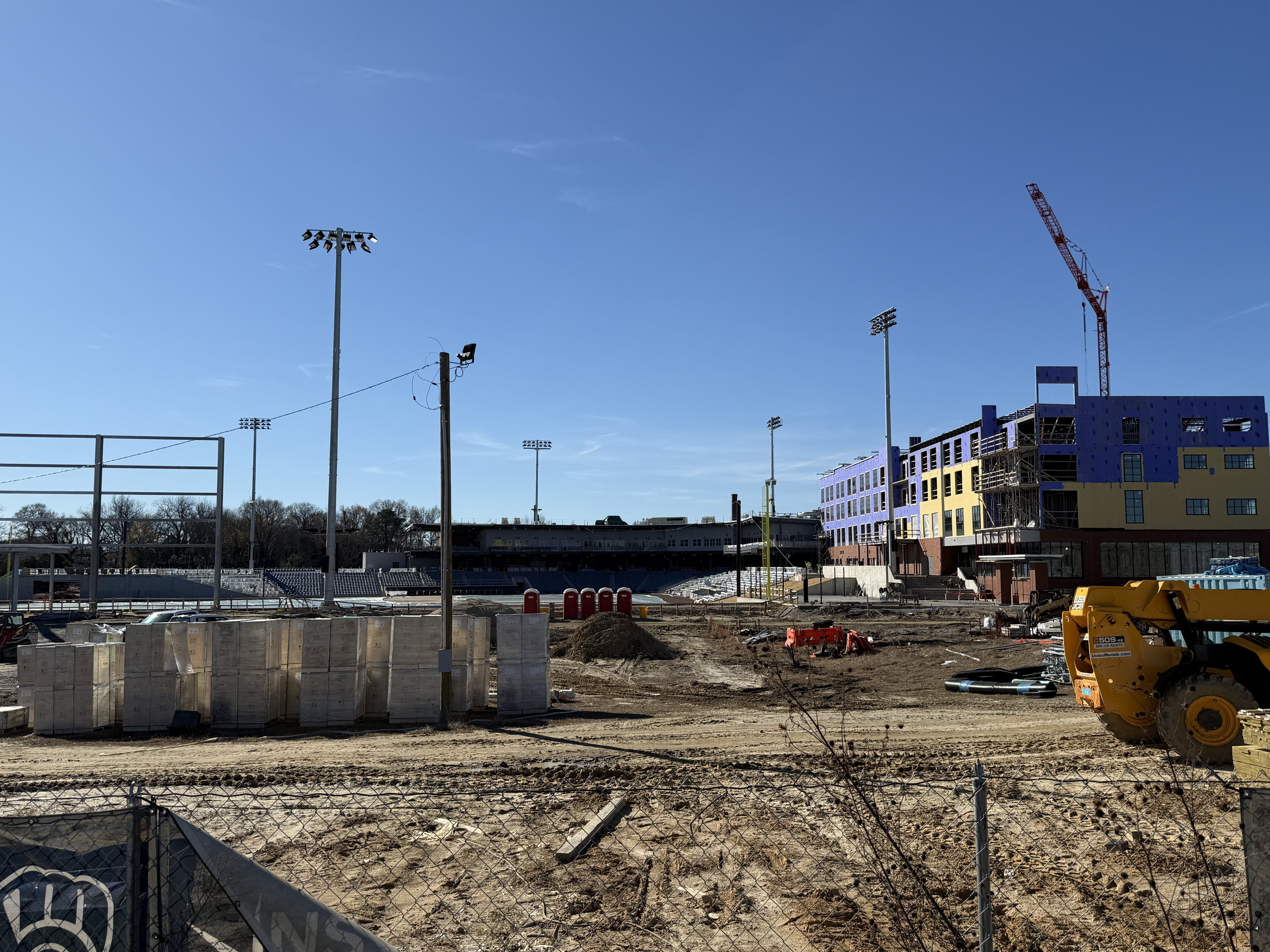
Wilson Ballpark (Wilson Warbirds)

=== Florida State League ===
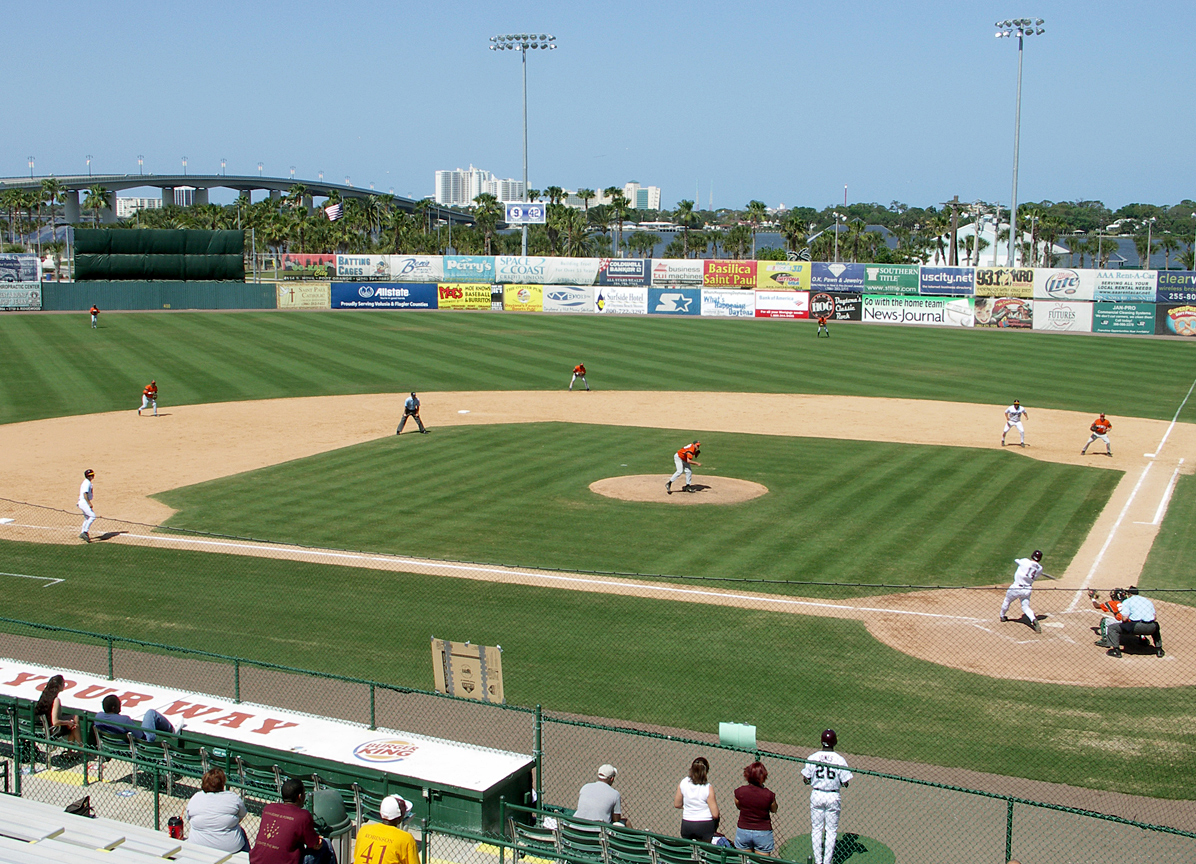
Jackie Robinson Ballpark (Daytona Tortugas)

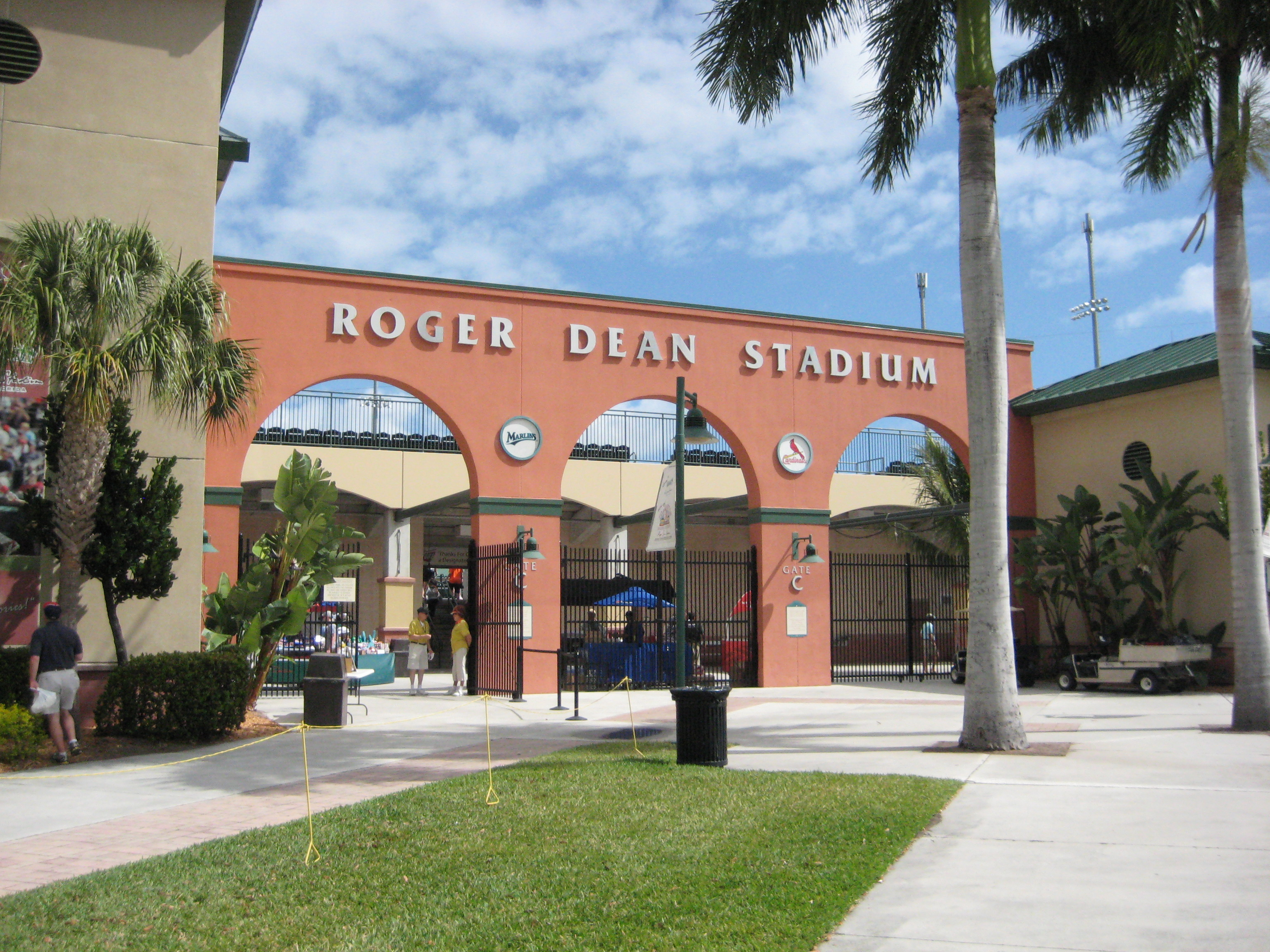
Roger Dean Chevrolet Stadium (Jupiter Hammerheads, Palm Beach Cardinals)

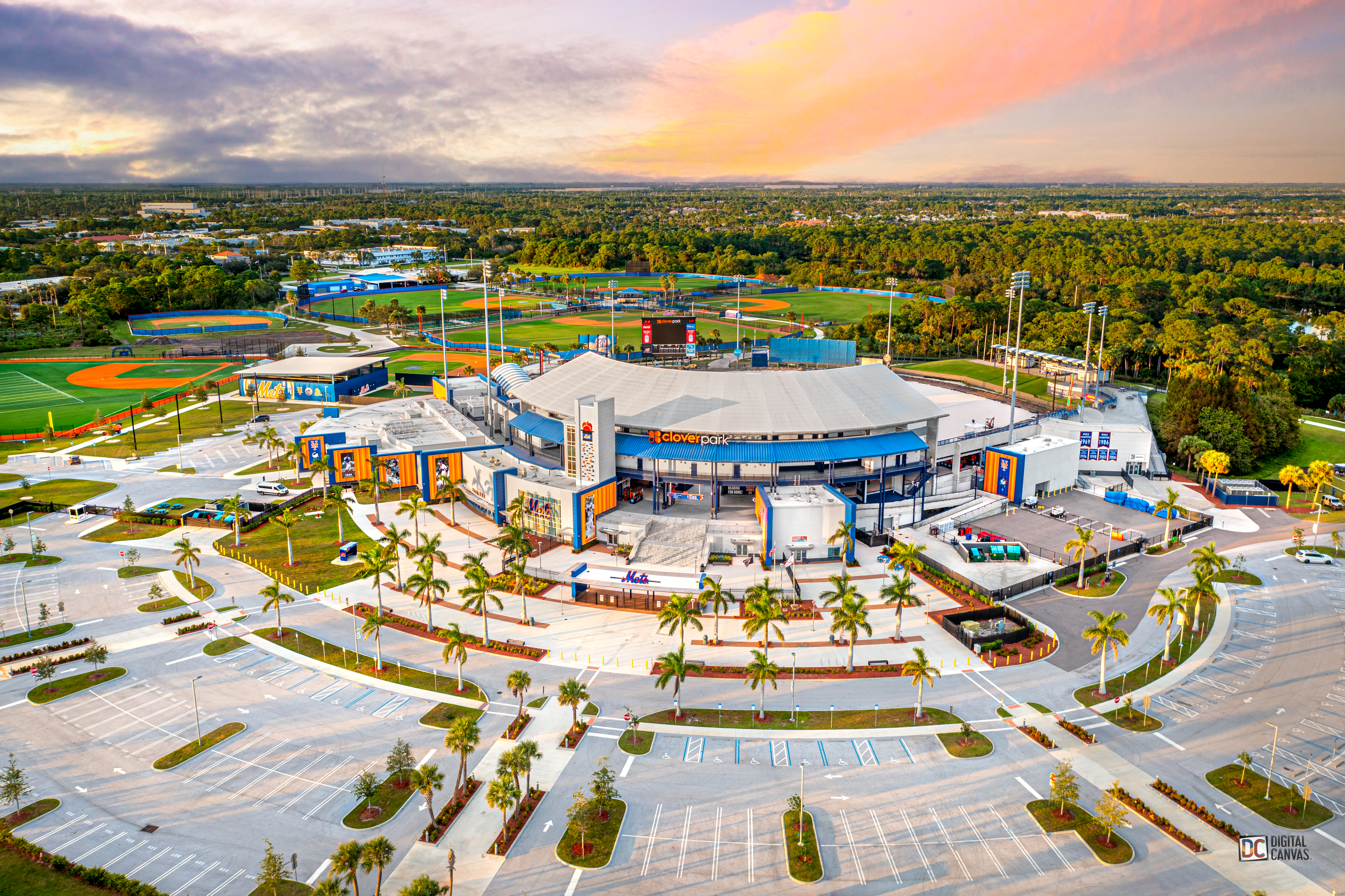
Clover Park (St. Lucie Mets)

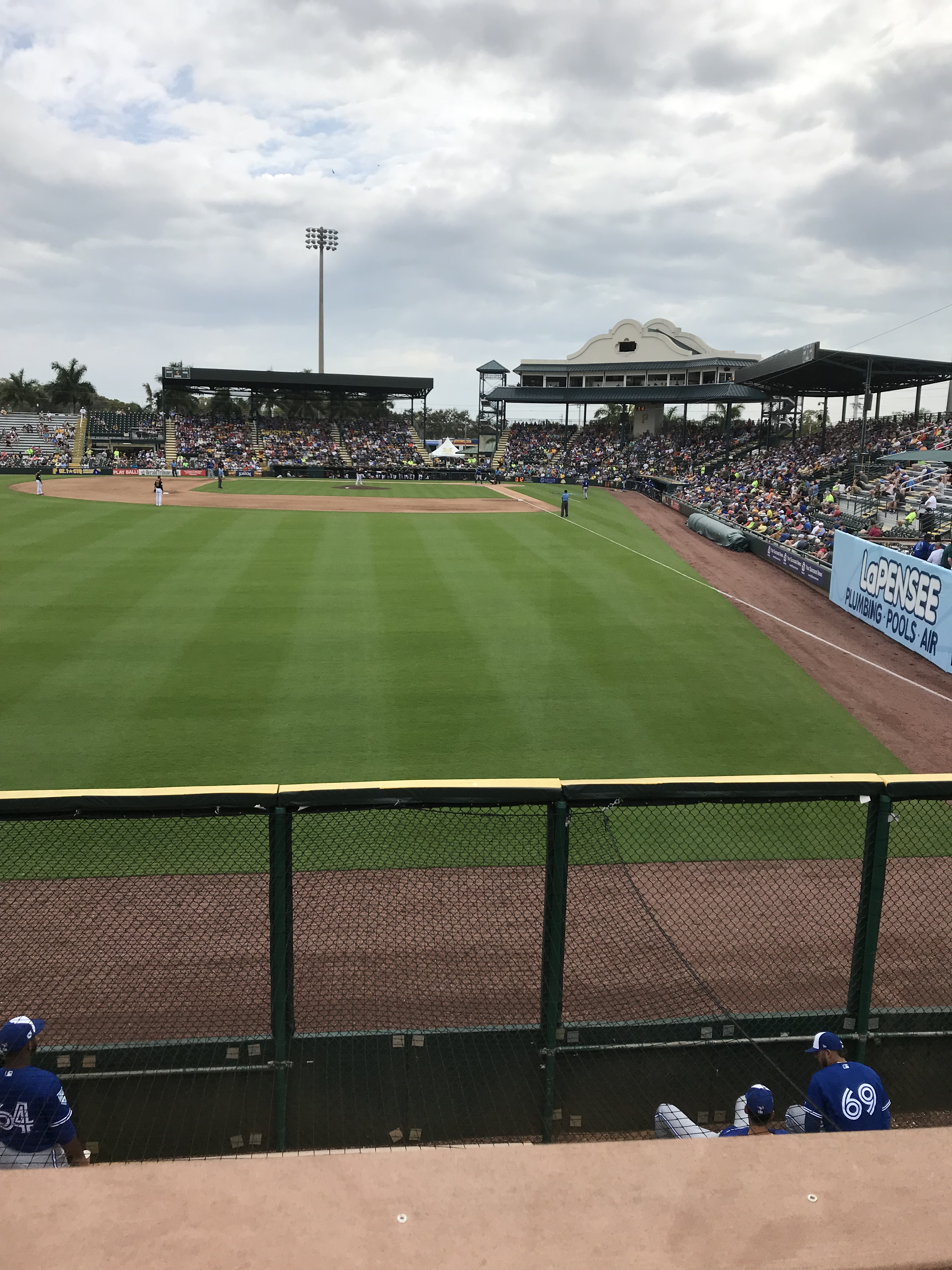
LECOM Park (Bradenton Marauders)

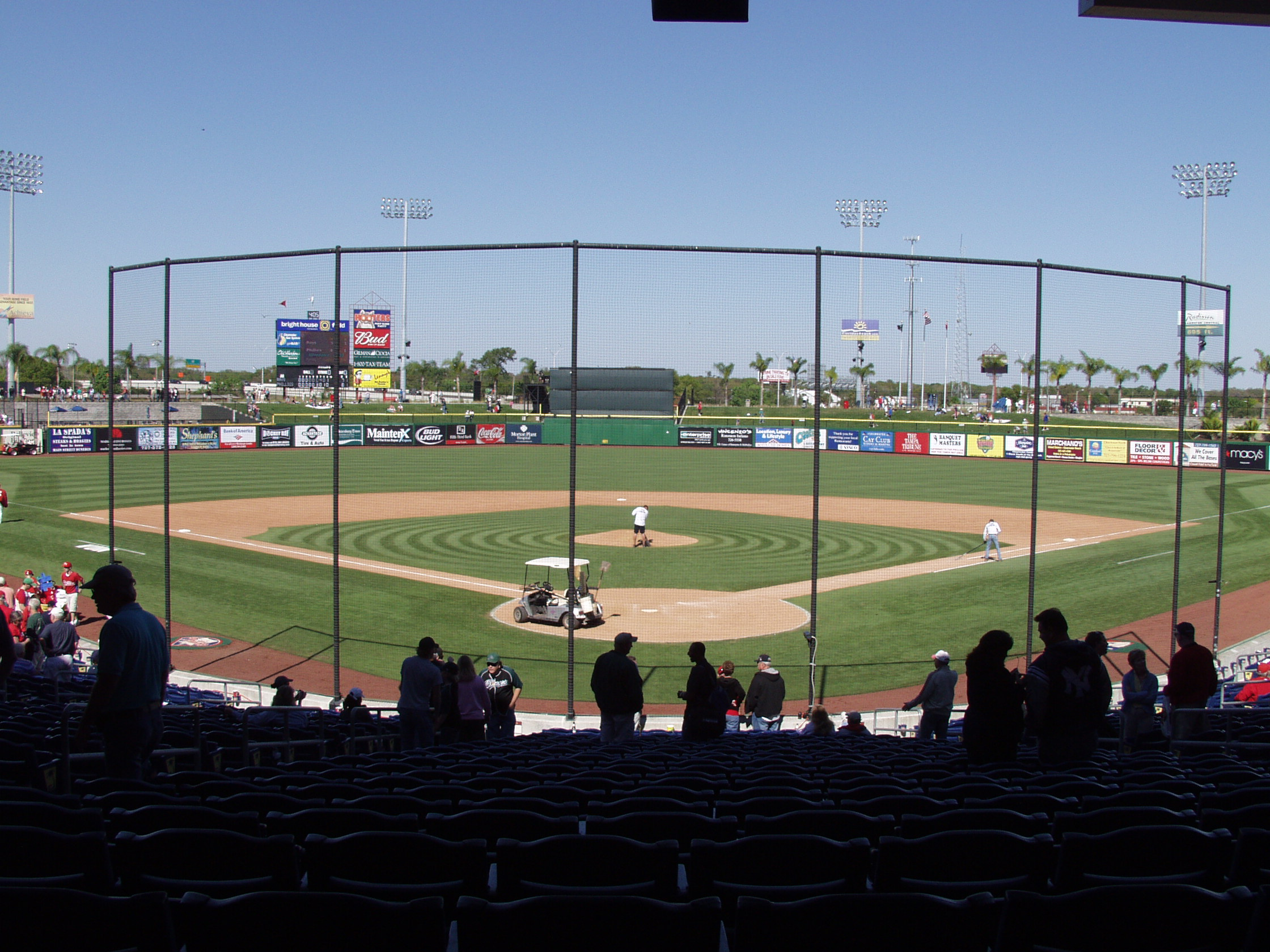
BayCare Ballpark (Clearwater Threshers)

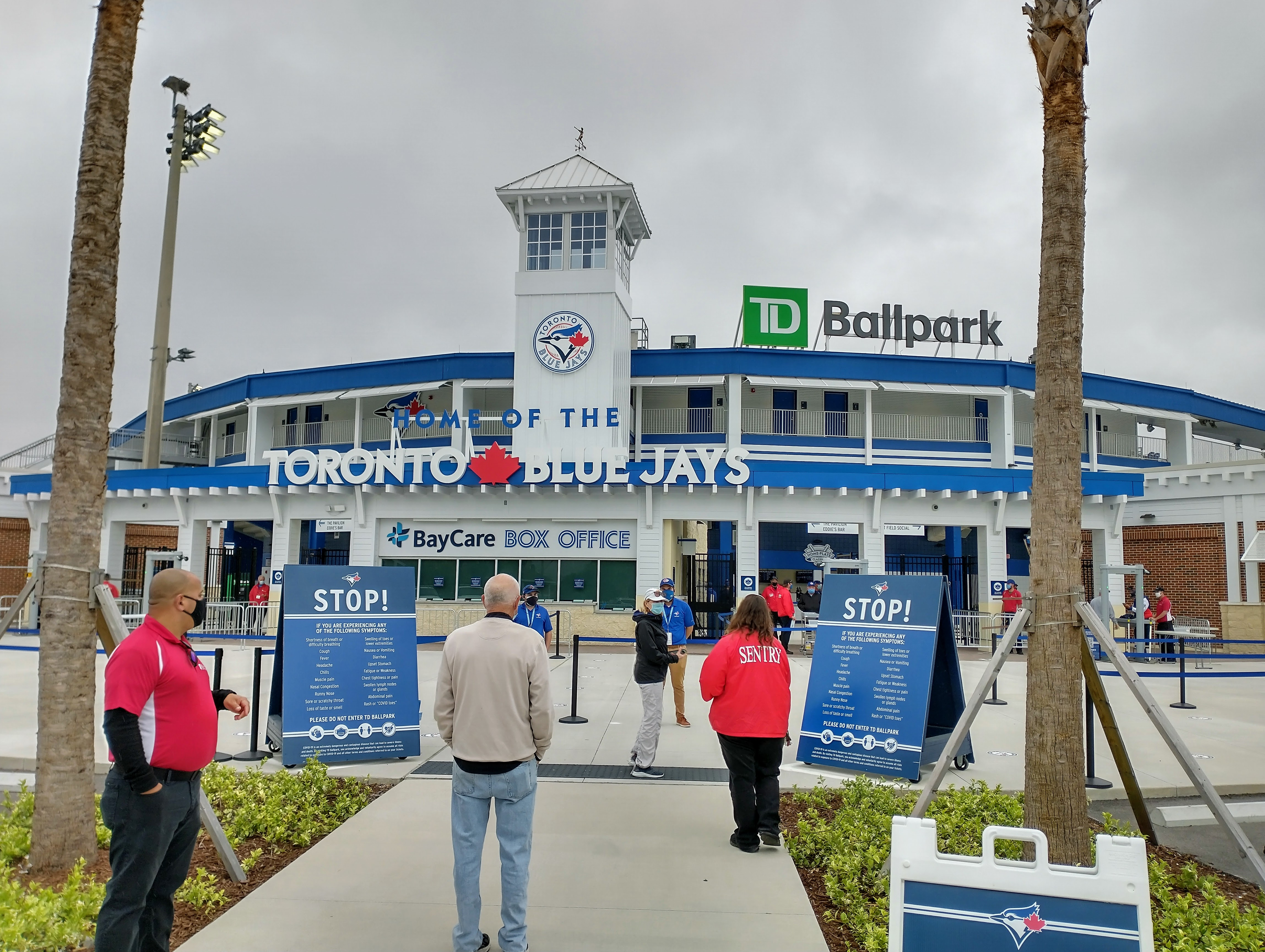
TD Ballpark (Dunedin Blue Jays)

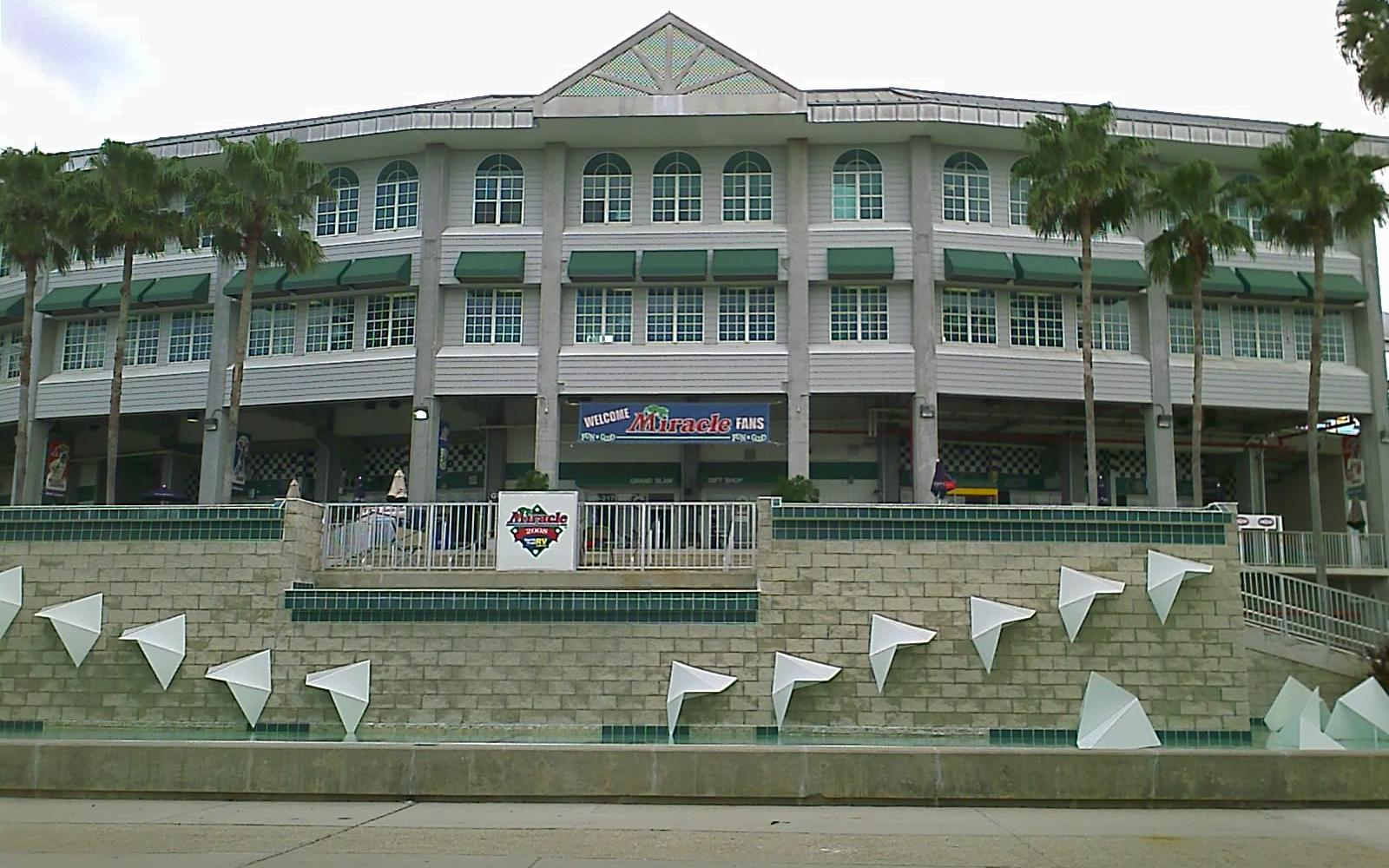
Hammond Stadium (Fort Myers Mighty Mussels)

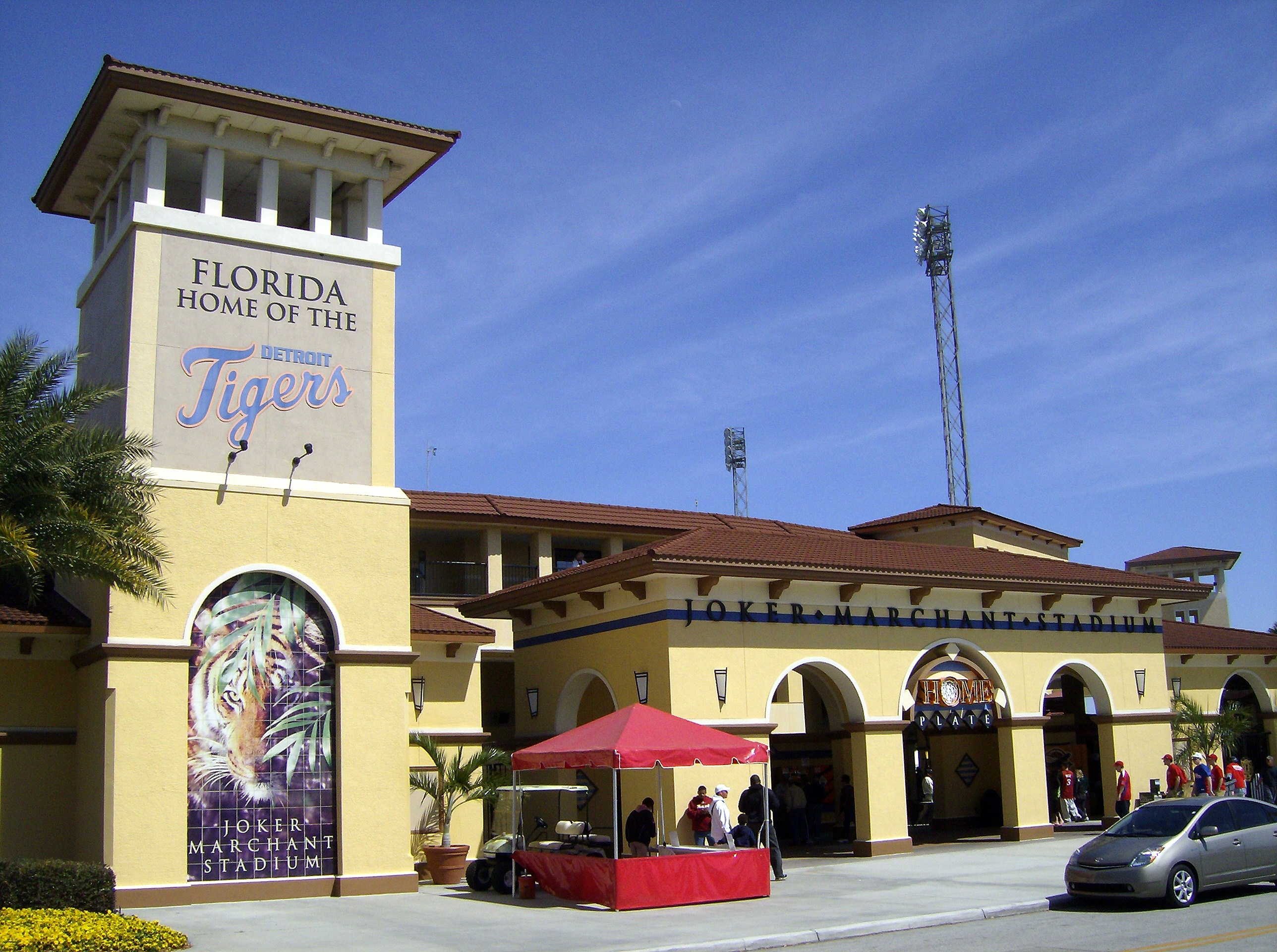
Joker Marchant Stadium (Lakeland Flying Tigers)

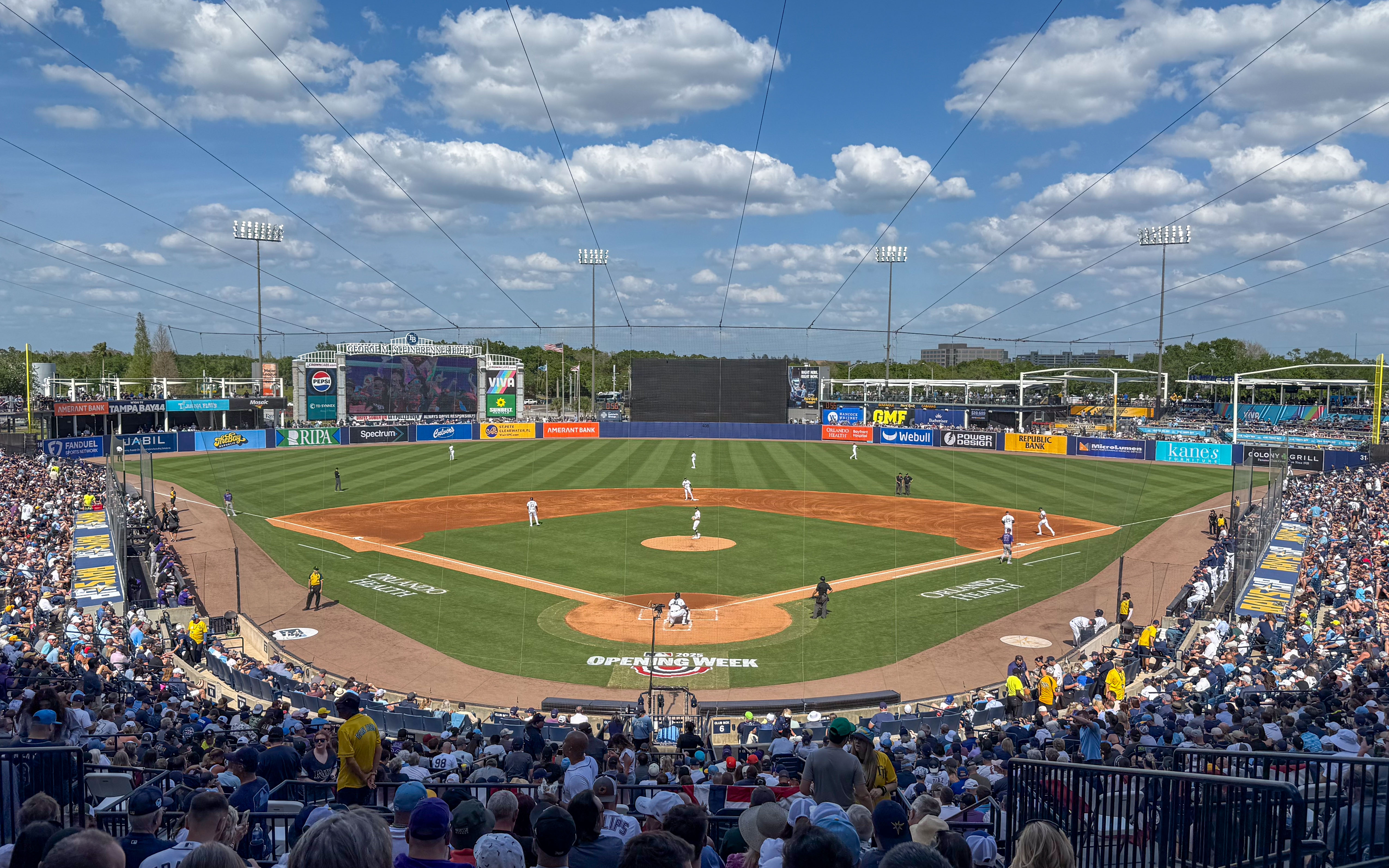
George M. Steinbrenner Field (Tampa Tarpons)

== See also ==
- List of Major League Baseball stadiums
- List of Triple-A baseball stadiums
- List of Double-A baseball stadiums
- List of High-A baseball stadiums
- List of Rookie baseball stadiums

== General reference ==
- "Get to know the teams in the Low-A East". MiLB.com. April 14, 2021.
- "Get to know the teams in the Low-A Southeast". MiLB.com. April 7, 2021.
- "Get to know the teams in the Low-A West". MiLB.com. April 21, 2021.
