= Scott Starr =

American singer

Scott Starr (born October 28, 1981, in Milwaukee, Wisconsin) is the lead singer and founding member of Fever Marlene, Owner of Rev Pop, Check For Pulse, Manifold Printery, Super Volta, and Notch Co.

== Red Bird Foundation ==
Scott started the Red Bird foundation in 2009. The Red Bird is a non-profit foundation supporting music education in Milwaukee, Wisconsin.

== Discography ==
- Caught in a Butterflynet (June 1999)
- Kadence - Autumn Let Me Know (May 2002)
- The People - EP (June 2005)
- Fever Marlene - Live in New York City (January 2007)
- Fever Marlene - Civil War (May 2007)
- Fever Marlene - White Chine (February 2008)
- Fever Marlene - Febrile State (November 2009)
- Fever Marlene - Medicated Friends (December 2012)
