= Wilson Warbirds =

Minor league baseball team in North Carolina

- Founded in 2026; Wilson, North Carolina

Team logo	Cap insignia

Minor league affiliations
- Class: Single-A (2026–present)
- League: Carolina League (2026–present)
- Division: North Division

Major league affiliations
- Team: Milwaukee Brewers (2026–present)

Minor league titles
- League titles (0): None

Team data
- Colors: Navy, sage, antique white, bristol, smalt, red
- Mascot: Wilt the Warbird
- Ballpark: Wilson Ballpark (2026–present)
- Owner/ Operator: Milwaukee Brewers
- President: Joe Ricciutti
- Manager: Eddy Morgan
- Website: milb.com/wilson

The Wilson Warbirds are a Minor League Baseball (MiLB) team of the Carolina League and the Single-A affiliate of the Milwaukee Brewers. They are located in Wilson, North Carolina, and are named after vintage military aircraft, or "warbirds," and for the region's history in aviation dating back to World War II. The team plays their home games at Wilson Ballpark, which opened in 2026.

The Warbirds were established in 2026 as the replacement of the Carolina Mudcats, who had been located in the nearby town of Zebulon at Five County Stadium since 1991, with the Brewers' decision to move largely based on funding concerns.

== History ==
=== Creation ===
The Carolina Mudcats were a Minor League Baseball (MiLB) team and the Single-A affiliate of the Milwaukee Brewers that had played at Five County Stadium in Zebulon, North Carolina, since 1991. In 2022, the Mudcats requested US$15 million from Wake County to renovate Five County Stadium to meet MiLB standards and attract fans. The county, however, only agreed to fund the required expenses. Later, on December 14, 2023, the nearby town of Wilson announced it was funding a $280 million development project, including a $70 million baseball stadium, later named Wilson Ballpark. Appealing to the Brewers, they signed a memorandum of understanding with Wilson to relocate the Mudcats to the new stadium in a lease lasting 25 years. Alongside the construction of the new stadium, the lack of funding from Wake County was regarded as a major reason for the Brewers' decision to move the Mudcats.

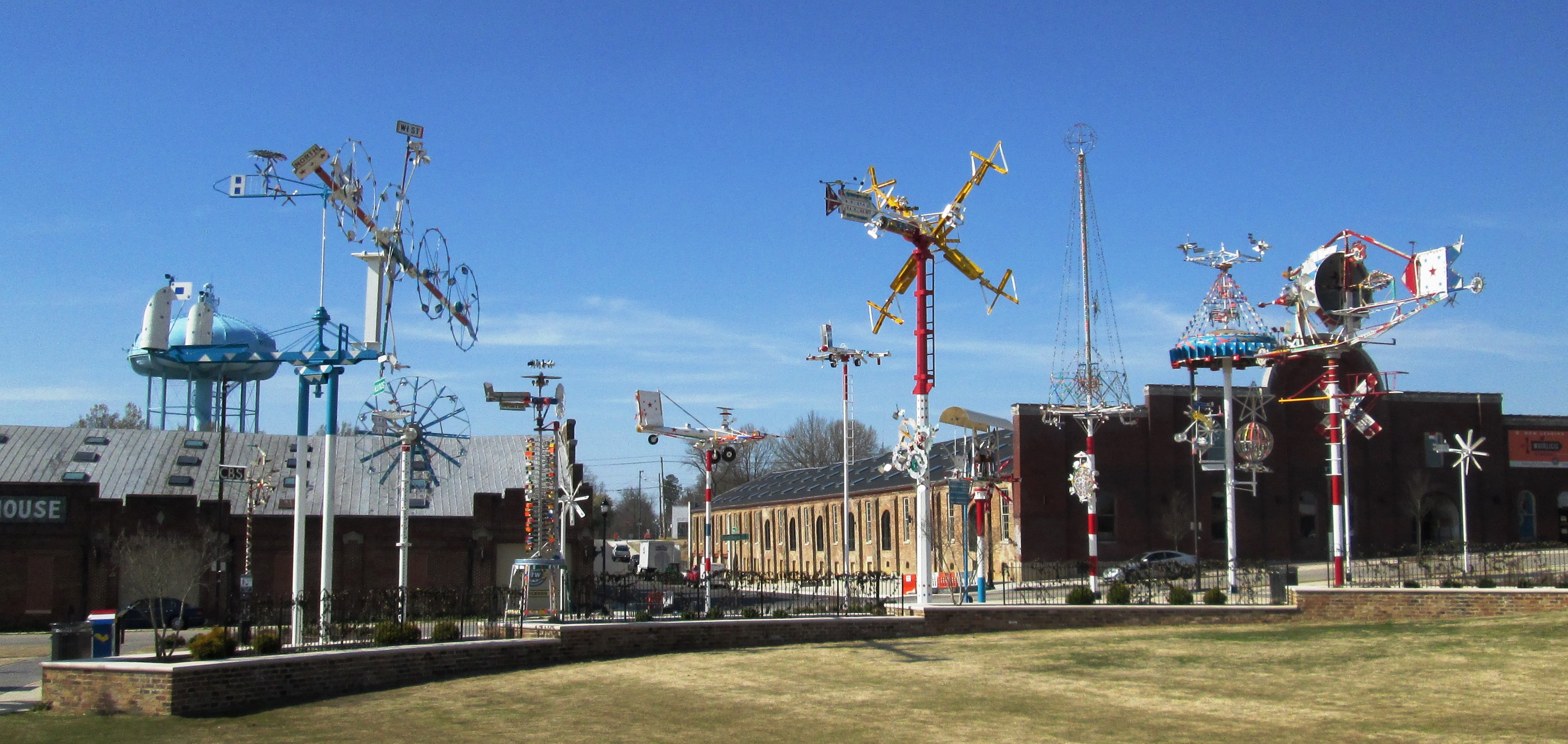
Vollis Simpson's whirligigs in Wilson, North Carolina, were an inspiration for the team's originally planned name.

On November 22, 2024, the Brewers organized an air show to announce the "Warbirds" as the name of the new team. The air show saw around 500 attendees, and included three World War II–era warbird aircraft, as well as a live band. Brewers minor-league prospects Eric Bitonti, Josh Knoth, and Braylon Payne were also in attendance. The name was chosen to represent the team because of the region's connection to aviation history. Thousands of pilots were trained in the area during World War II and Seymour Johnson Air Force Base is located nearby. Wilson was also the hometown of whirligig outsider artist and former pilot Vollis Simpson. In reference to Simpson's work, "Wilson Whirligigs" was the long-time proposed name for the team, and was only changed after a visit by branding organizer Scott Starr to Wilson, who believed the name lacked nuance. The Mudcats played their last season in Zebulon in 2025.

=== The 2026 season ===
The Wilson Warbirds played their first game on April 3, 2026, against the Fayetteville Woodpeckers at Segra Stadium in Fayetteville, North Carolina. The game remained scoreless until the top of the ninth inning when Wilson's Filippo Di Turi came home to score on a ground out and Jadyn Fielder scored on a throwing error. Jose Meneses struck out the final batter in the bottom of the inning for a 2–0 victory. Their inaugural home opener was played on April 14 in a sold out game against the Hill City Howlers at Wilson Ballpark. Two runs scored in the third inning and five more in the fourth were all the Warbirds needed to seal the 7–5 victory before a crowd of 3,700 people.

The Carolina League uses a split season format in which the division winners from each half of the season qualify for the championship playoffs. Wilson ended the first half of the 2026 season in second place at 36–30, ten games behind first. They placed fourth, 11 games back, in the second half at 28–36. Overall, Wilson posted a 64–66 record in their first season. Shortstop Brady Ebel, who led the league with a .417 on-base percentage and 96 walks, won the Carolina League Top MLB Prospect Award.

== Season-by-season records ==
Key
League	The team's final position in the league standings
Division	The team's final position in the divisional standings
GB	Games behind the team that finished in first place in the division that season
†	League champions (2026–present)
*	Division champions (2026–present)
^	Postseason berth (2026–present)

Season-by-season records
Season	League	Regular-season					Postseason			MLB affiliate	Ref.
Season	League	Record	Win %	League	Division	GB	Record	Win %	Result	MLB affiliate	Ref.
2026	CL	64–66	.492	8th	3rd	15 1/2	—	—	Result	—	Milwaukee Brewers
Totals	—	64–66	.492	—	—	—	—	—	—	—	—

== Branding ==
The Warbirds' mascot is a red-tailed hawk named Wilt the Warbird. This specific bird was chosen as it was the most common hawk in the region. The team colors are navy, sage, antique white, bristol, and smalt. The Warbird's away jerseys are colored bristol with a sage band, the alternate jerseys are red with a white band, and their three caps feature bristol, sage, and navy.

== Ownership ==
The team is led by the president Joe Ricciutti and general manager David Lawrence. Since the Carolina Mudcats, the Milwaukee Brewers had owned the majority share of the team. In the weeks before the first Warbirds game, however, the Brewers began negotiations to sell their majority share to sports executive and long-time minority owner of the Brewers, John Canning Jr.. According to City of Wilson manager Rodger Lentz, the Brewers showed no intention of selling their share until Canning approached them about the deal. The deal, if successful would still leave the Brewers with a minority share of the team.

== Roster ==
Wilson Warbirds roster
Players	Coaches/Other
Pitchers: 35 Joey Broughton; 17 Frank Cairone; 18 Carlos Carra; 30 Enniel Cortez; 23 Cesar Espinal; 43 Andrew Gaines; 30 Ma'Kale Holden; 16 Dariel Jaquez; 10 Wenderlyn King; 28 Diustin Mayorquin; 25 Enderson Mercado; 29 Joan Pena; 19 Eric Prado; 14 Tyler Renz; 21 Hayden Robinson; 38 Luke Roupe; 31 Ismael Yanez; Catchers: 34 Kevin Garcia; 9 Eric Martinez; 7 Rylan Mills; Infielders: 4 Filippo Di Turi; 22 Trey Ebel; 11 Frederi Montero; 12 Moises Polanco; 44 Carsten Sabathia III; Outfielders: 15 José Anderson; 5 Brailyn Antunez; 20 Handelfry Encarnacion; 2 Pedro Ibarguen; 3 Kyle Jones	Manager: 27 Eddy Morgan; Coaches: 46 Ricky Carvajal (coach); 37 José García (hitting); 40 Jesús Hernández (pitching); 50 Paul Moeller (pitching); 60-day injured list: -- Jack Hostetler; -- Anfernny Reyes; -- Griffin Tobias (full season); 7-day injured list; * On Milwaukee Brewers 40-man roster; ~ Development list; # Rehab assignment; ∞ Reserve list; ‡ Restricted list; § Suspended list; † Temporarily inactive list; Roster updated September 6, 2026; Transactions; → More rosters: MiLB • Carolina League; → Milwaukee Brewers minor league players
