= Fever Marlene =

- Origin: Milwaukee, Wisconsin, U.S.
- Genres: Alternative rock, Indie rock, Rock
- Years active: 2003–present
- Label: Khemitones Records
- Members: Scott Starr; Kevin Dunphy
- Past members: Dan Mahony; Christian Hansen; Ryan Gardiner
- Website: stillinmyblood.com

Fever Marlene is an alternative rock band from Milwaukee, Wisconsin, formed in 2003 as a duo of Scott Starr (vocals, guitar, bass pedals, synth, piano, cello) and Kevin Dunphy (drums, vocals). The band emerged during the early-2000s "garage rock" revival, briefly expanded into a five-piece in the early 2010s, and returned to its original two-piece configuration for its 2026 album Still In My Blood.

== Background ==
Starr and Dunphy met while studying in Madison and initially rehearsed together under the name The People. After short stints in Los Angeles and Chicago, the duo moved back to Wisconsin and began recording as Fever Marlene, taking the name from Starr's interest in vintage films and the actress Marlene Dietrich.

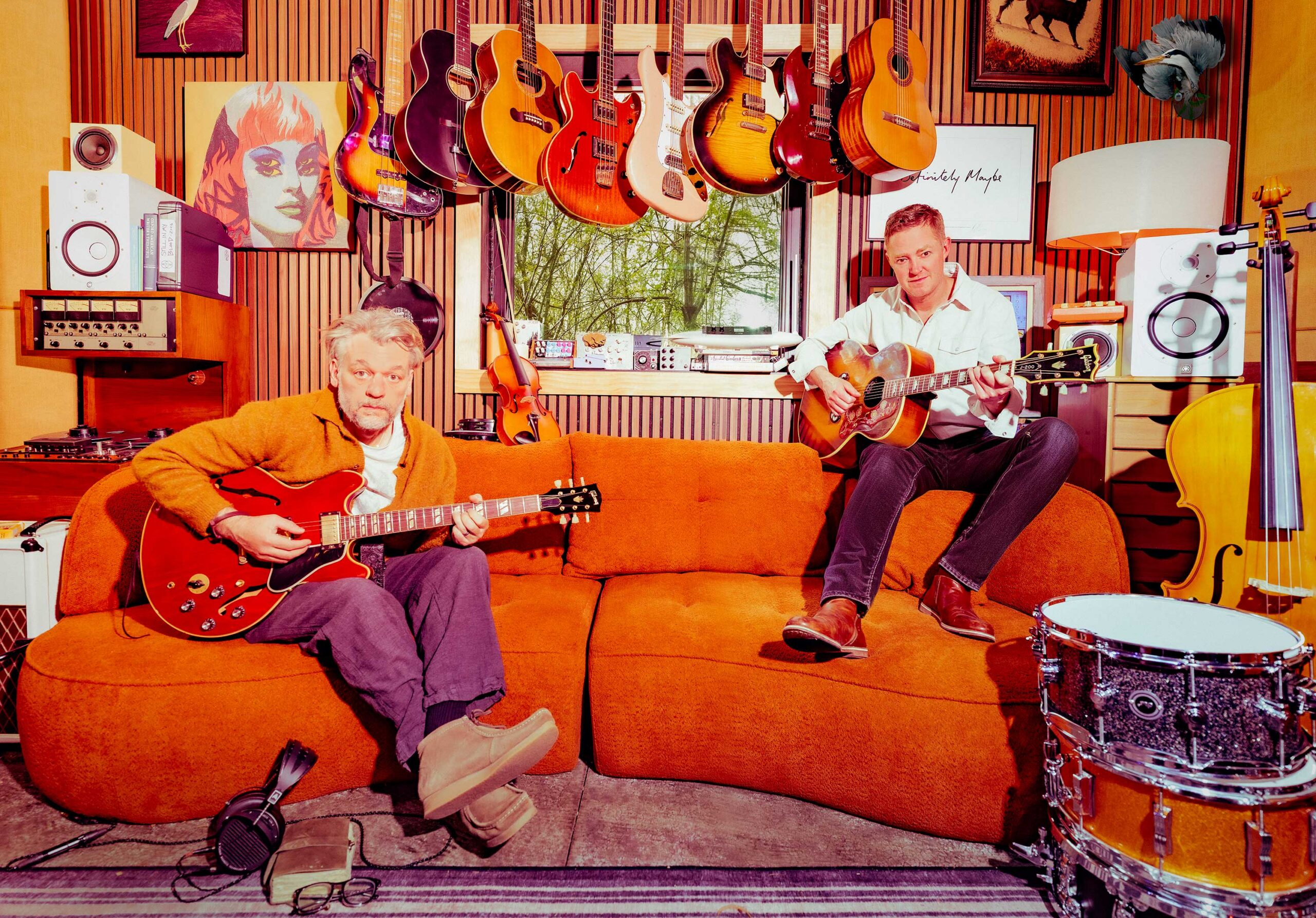

Fever Marlene released their debut studio album, Civil War, on their own independent label Khemitones Records in 2007. Their second album, White China (2008), was written and recorded over a four-night stay at New York's Chelsea Hotel. During their first three years as a band they reportedly went through "three zip codes and three complete artistic overhauls" before releasing Civil War.

The band has toured with MGMT, The Flaming Lips, Social Distortion, The Redwalls, Donita Sparks, and Tapes 'n Tapes.

Expanding to a five-piece, the band released Medicated Friends in 2013 with the addition of Dan Mahony (bass, guitar, vocals), Ryan Gardiner (synth, organs) and Christian Hansen (guitar, vocals). Fever Marlene has historically written, produced, recorded, mixed and mastered their own material in their self-built studio built, Khemitones Sound Studios.

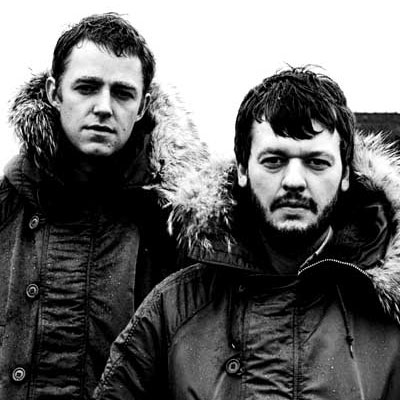
Fever Marlene

== Hiatus and return (2013–2026) ==
Following the release of Medicated Friends in 2013, the band entered an extended hiatus, though Starr has stated they never formally broke up. After Dunphy relocated to Minneapolis, the two stayed in contact and occasionally traded song ideas remotely.

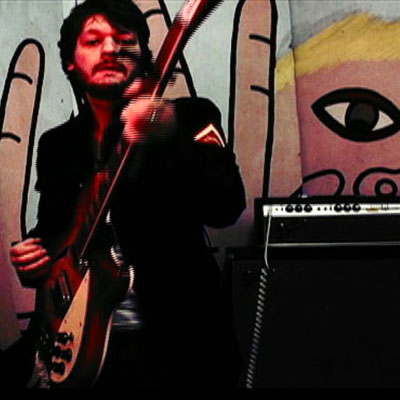
Scott Starr

Starr resumed writing in 2025 following the death of his mother from stomach cancer that July. Working out of a soundproof studio he built on his property outside Milwaukee, he tracked the band's fourth studio album, Still In My Blood, to a vintage 2-inch 24-track Otari tape machine routed through a Neve console, playing guitar, piano, bass synth and cello in addition to producing, mixing and mastering the record. Violinist and violist Shauncey Ali contributed string arrangements. The album was announced for release in mid-June 2026 on Khemitones Records, with the title track premiering May 7, 2026, and released as a single on May 19, 2026.

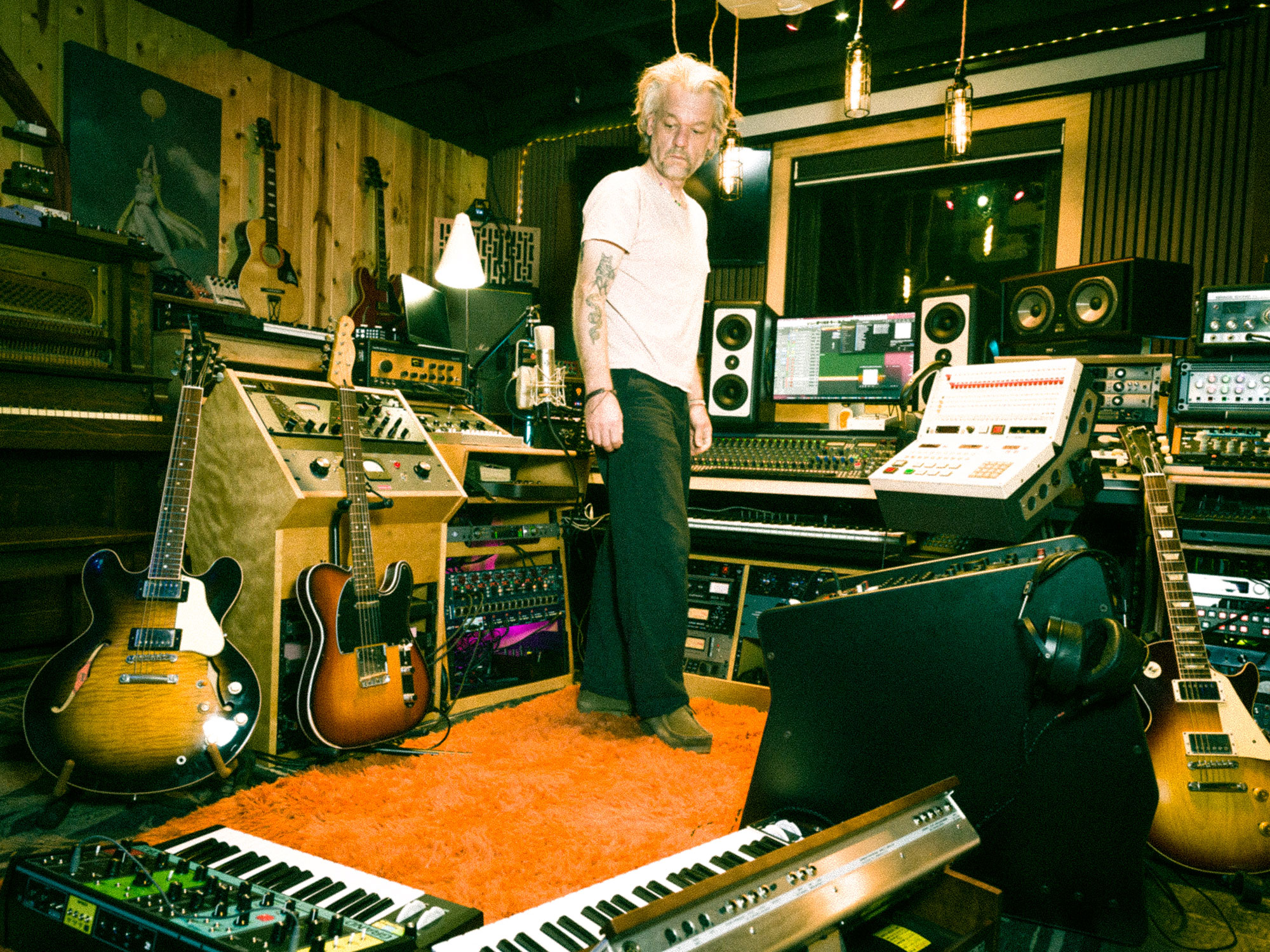
Khemitones Sound Studios

Outside of Fever Marlene, Starr runs the Milwaukee-based graphic design firm Rev Pop.

== Band members ==
Current

- Scott Starr – vocals, guitar, bass synth, piano, cello
- Kevin Dunphy – drums, vocals

Former

- Dan Mahony – bass guitar, vocals
- Christian Hansen – guitar
- Ryan Gardiner – synth, organs, vocals

== Discography ==
Studio albums

- Civil War (June 15, 2007)
- White China (March 7, 2008)
- Medicated Friends (February 3, 2013)
- Still In My Blood (June 2026)

Live albums

- Live In New York City (January 2007)
- Febrile State (May 16, 2009)
