= Wilson Ballpark =

Baseball stadium in Wilson, North Carolina

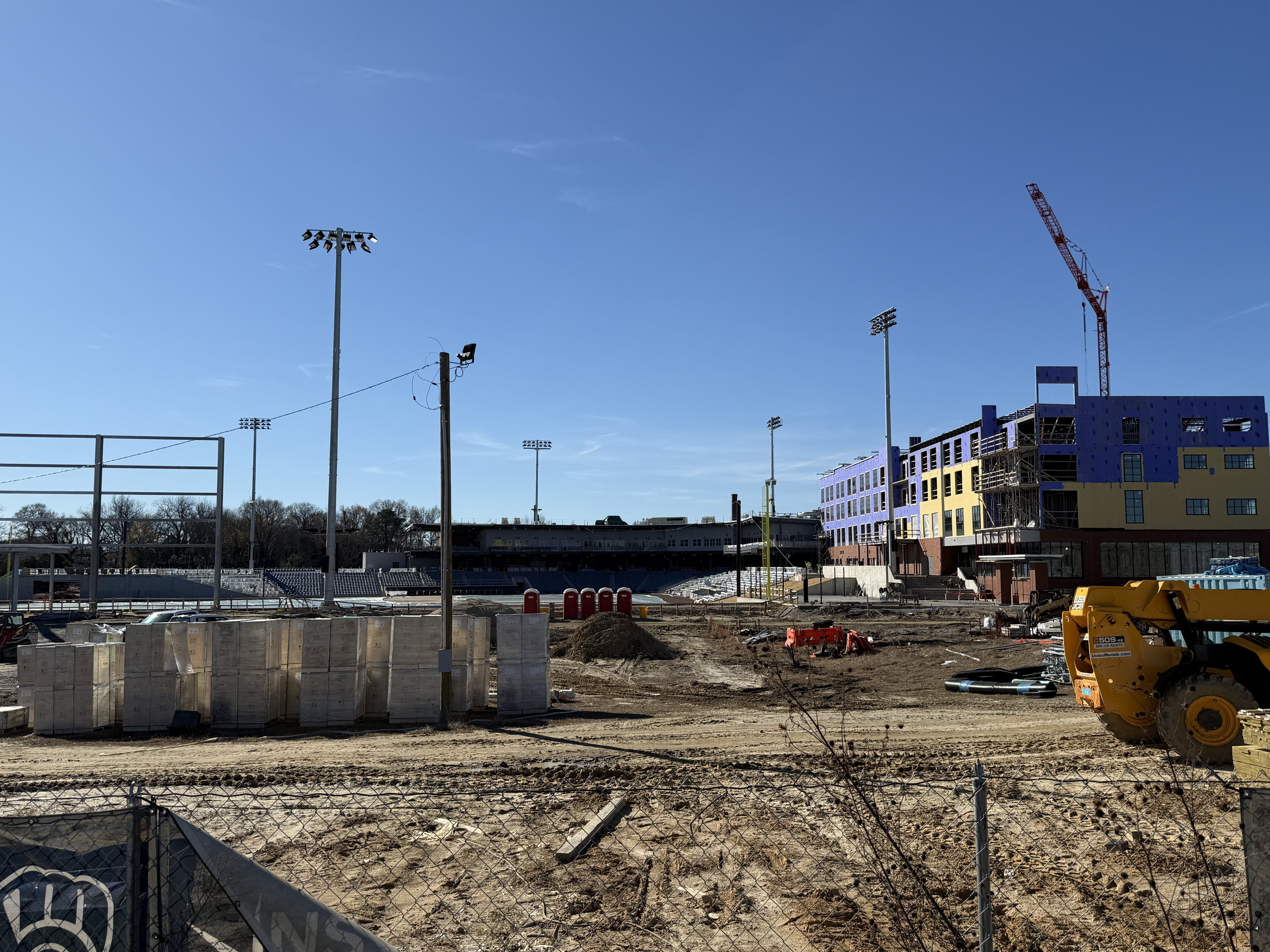
- Construction of the stadium in December 2025
- Interactive map of Wilson Ballpark
- Address: 401 Goldsboro St. South; Wilson, North Carolina; United States
- Coordinates: 35°43′15″N 77°54′52″W
- Seating type: Stadium seating
- Capacity: 3,700 (fixed seating); 5,000 (total capacity)
- Executive suites: 8
- Type: Baseball stadium
- Event: Minor League Baseball
- Surface: Bermuda grass
- Field size: Left field: 325 ft (99 m); Left-center field: 371 ft (113 m); Center field: 400 ft (120 m); Right-center field: 371 ft (113 m); Right field: 325 ft (99 m)
- Parking: Yes (Note: The amount of parking is unspecified)

Construction
- Groundbreaking: May 10, 2024
- Built: 2024–2026
- Opened: April 14, 2026
- Cost: $70 million (Note: Other estimates have referred to the cost of the stadium as $69 million and $64 million.)
- Architect: Pendulum Studio
- Builders: Barton Malow; Clancy & Theys Construction Company

Tenant
- Wilson Warbirds (CL) 2026–present

Website
- milb.com/wilson/ballpark

Wilson Ballpark, formerly Wilson Stadium, is a baseball stadium located in Wilson, North Carolina. It is the home field for the Wilson Warbirds, a Minor League Baseball team of the Carolina League.

Construction for the stadium started on May 10, 2024, and was completed by Opening Day of the Warbirds' 2026 season. It has seating capacity of 3,700 people and a total capacity of 5,000. The field has a natural grass playing surface. Reactions to the main tenants of the stadium being the Wilson Warbirds have been generally positive in the city of Wilson, but have had some criticism from the nearby towns of Zebulon and Wendell, North Carolina, and from the Wilson Tobs, an collegiate summer baseball team which was already located in Wilson.

== History ==
=== Construction ===
Prior to the stadium, the land was the location of a small local restaurant that cooked chitterlings. On May 10, 2024, a groundbreaking ceremony took place to mark the beginning of construction for the $70-million stadium as part of a wider $280-million development project approved by the city of Wilson, North Carolina. On December 14, 2023, the city of Wilson had negotiated with the Milwaukee Brewers to move their Single-A affiliate Minor League Baseball (MiLB) team, the Carolina Mudcats, to the stadium as its first tenants after its completion. The memorandum of understanding between the two parties saw the Brewers lease the Mudcats, being rebranded as the Wilson Warbirds, to the stadium for a minimum of 25 years.

Reactions to the relocation and rebranding of the Mudcats to the city were generally positive in Wilson, with Paul Durham of The Wilson Times commenting it was "probably the most spectacular building ever constructed in Wilson County". Meanwhile, a number of officials in nearby Zebulon and Wendell, North Carolina, which were close to the Mudcats, were upset by the move and the economic concerns which would result from the areas loss of the team. Furthermore, the Wilson Tobs, an collegiate summer baseball team already located in Wilson, wrote a formal list of questions to the city contesting why they were not considered as tenants for the stadium.

Barton Malow, Clancy & Theys Construction Company, and other groups were contracted by the city to build the stadium. To aid in paying for the facility, Wilson increased the city's property tax rate by two cents, from 57.5 to 59.5 cents per $100 of valuation. The stadium opened on April 14, 2026, to host the sold out first game of the Warbirds.

== Design ==
The stadium accommodates 3,700 seats, with additional standing room to hold a total capacity of 5,000. This capacity is about 2,000 fewer than what the Mudcats had at their previous Five County Stadium. The facility has eight private suites in addition to a baseball club lounge, a banquet facility which can accommodate 250 people, and a right field picnic area. The field has a natural grass surface.′ Outside the stadium has street side parking and a kids play area, which is open year-round. In addition to baseball, the stadium is designed to host concerts and other community events. The stadium will be surrounded by mixed-use development including office space, retail space, townhomes, apartments, and an 80-room hotel which will overlook the field.
