= Intimidator =

An intimidator is a person who employs intimidation.

(The) Intimidator(s) may also refer to:

== Nickname for Dale Earnhardt ==
"(The) Intimidator" was a nickname of NASCAR driver Dale Earnhardt (1951-2001).

- Intimidator (roller coaster), at Carowinds amusement park
- Intimidator 305, former name of a roller coaster at Kings Dominion amusement park
- Kannapolis Intimidators, a minor-league baseball team which Earnhardt owned at the time of his death
  - Intimidators Stadium, the home venue of the baseball team
- Chevrolet Silverado Intimidator SS, a 2006 special edition of the Siliverado SS pickup truck line

== Books ==
- The Intimidators, a 1974 novel by Donald Hamilton, fifteenth in the Matt Helm secret agent novel series

== Other uses ==
- Intimidators (comics), a 2005 Image Comics mini-series
