= The Van Buren =

Music venue in Phoenix, Arizona

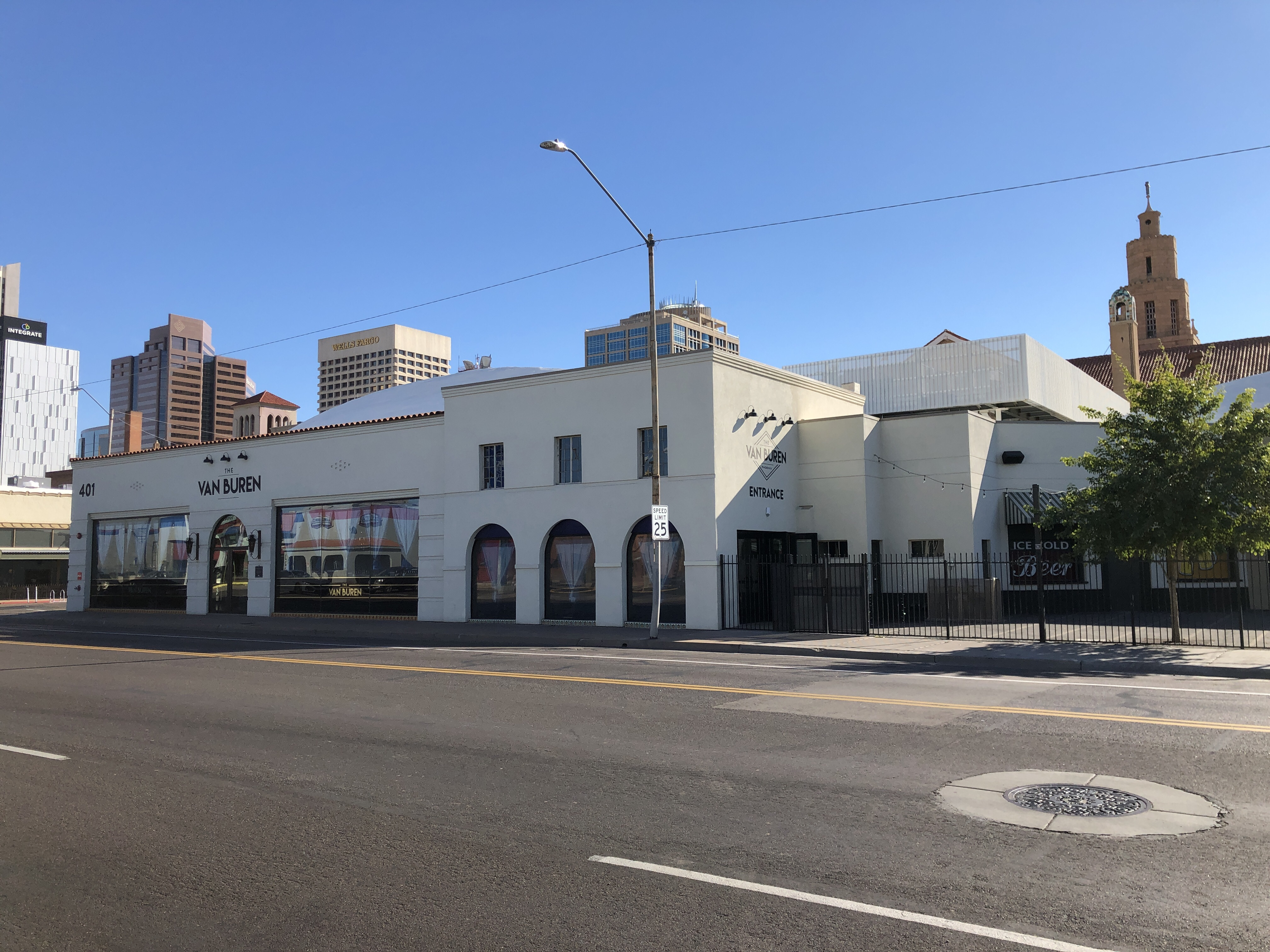
- The Van Buren as seen from Van Buren St. in 2019.
- Interactive map of The Van Buren
- Address: 401 W Van Buren St, Phoenix, AZ 85003
- Location: Metro Phoenix
- Coordinates: 33.45106°N 112.07943°W
- Owner: Live Nation Entertainment
- Capacity: 1,800

Construction
- Opened: August 23, 2017

Website
- Venue website
- Phoenix Motor Company building
- U.S. National Register of Historic Places
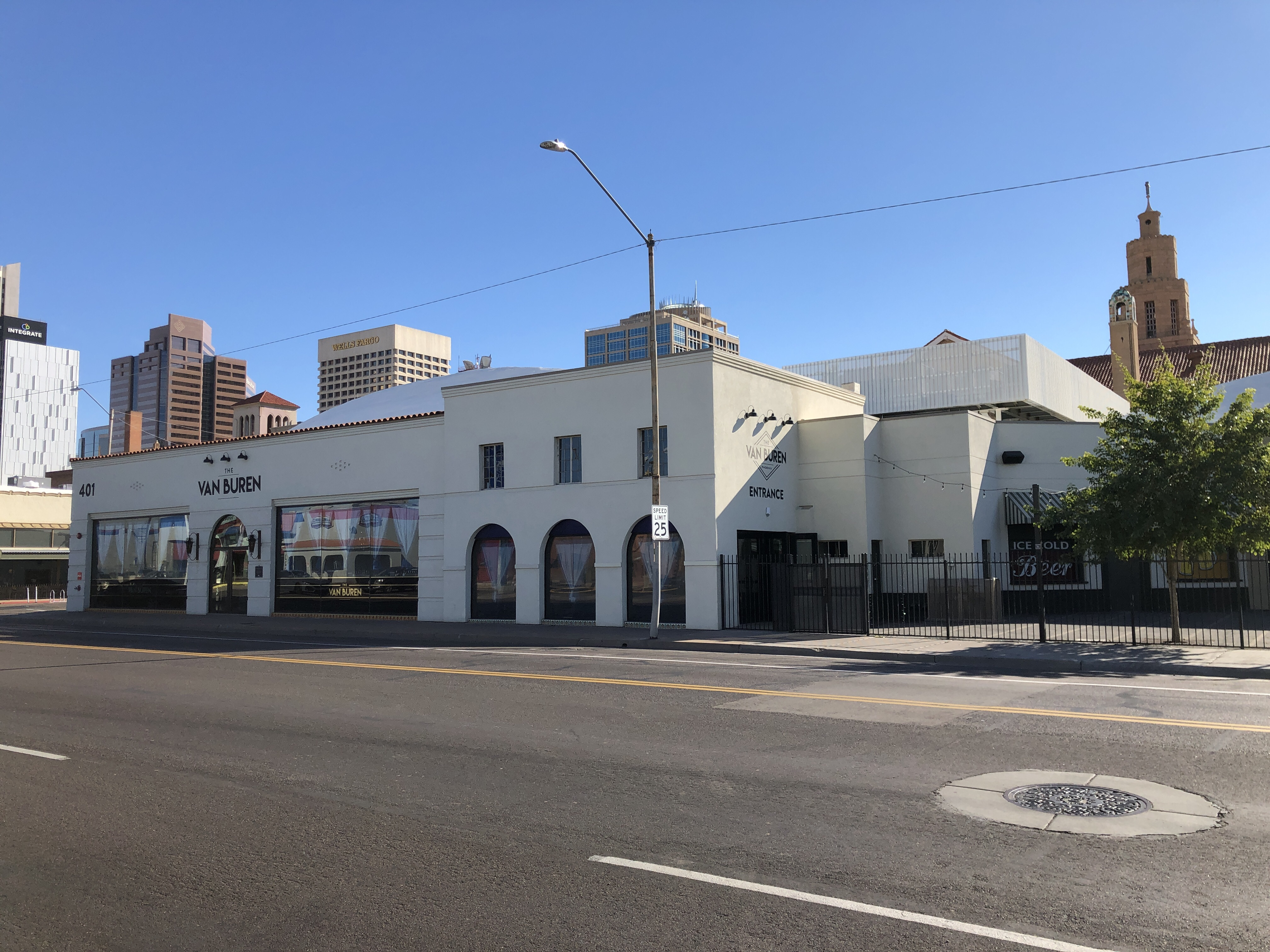
- The Van Buren located in the Phoenix Motor Company, 2018

- Location within Arizona Location within the United States
- Location: 401 W Van Buren Street, Phoenix, Arizona
- Built: October 1930
- Architect: Lescher & Mahoney
- Architectural style: Spanish Revival/Baroque Revival
- NRHP reference No.: 100003064
- Added to NRHP: 2018-11-01

The Van Buren is a music venue located in Downtown Phoenix, Arizona. The venue sits on the southwest corner of Van Buren St. and 4th Ave. Originally known as the Phoenix Motor Company building and the Dud R. Day Motor Company building, it was built in 1929 for the Phoenix Motor Company. It was designed by Lescher and Mahoney, who also designed the Orpheum Theatre.

== History ==
The building was originally built in 1929 and home to the Phoenix Motor Company The building was designed by Lescher and Mahoney, the same firm that created Phoenix's Orpheum Theatre.

Pat Cantelme and his business partner Jim Kuykendall bought the building for $2.2 million in 2015. At the time, almost all of the building doors and windows had been boarded and plastered over, making it hard to see the potential of the structure. Cantelme and Kuykendall approached Charlie Levy, owner of other local Phoenix venues The Crescent Ballroom and Valley Bar, about the purchase of the building and a possible partnership. After rediscovering the original storefront, doors, and windows, the group of partners received a $250,000 grant to help restore the building to its original design.

The Van Buren opened in the building on August 23, 2017 (Cold War Kids was the inaugural performance). There was enough space to fit 1,700 to 1,900 concertgoers. The 1,900 capacity concert hall was voted Best New Music Venue in 2017, Best Large Venue in 2019, and Best Medium-Sized Venue in 2020. It was added to the Phoenix Historic Property Register in May 2017 and to the National Register of Historic Places in December 2018.

In April 2021, Live Nation Entertainment took over control and ownership of The Van Buren. The group had had a partial stake in the venue prior, and bought out majority owner Charlie Levy after financial struggles due in large part to the COVID-19 pandemic that shutdown much of the music industry and touring.

== Notable performances ==
A Joywave/Cold War Kids show was the first official performance to be played at the venue on August 23, 2017. Phoenix Afrobeat Orchestra performed the night before for the venue's soft opening, acting as a stress test for employees. Phoenix Afrobest Orchestra was also the first show for the venue after its fifteen-month closure due to the COVID-19 pandemic.

On August 18, 2026, after performing just three to six songs, recurring technical problems frustrated rapper Nine Vicious. He vented his anger about the venue, leading the audience in expletive laden chants. He continued to escalate the matter, throwing a security guard's headset on the ground and encouraging the crowd to "mess up" the venue.

The show was abruptly canceled by the venue. While leaving, some attendees grew unruly, damaged property, and tried to force their way past a security gate toward the artist's tour bus. The Phoenix Police Department responded around 9:00 p.m., using pepper spray and pepper balls to disperse the remaining crowd.

== See also ==
- List of historic properties in Phoenix, Arizona
- Phoenix Historic Property Register
