= Orpheum Lofts =

High-rise building in Phoenix, Arizona, United States

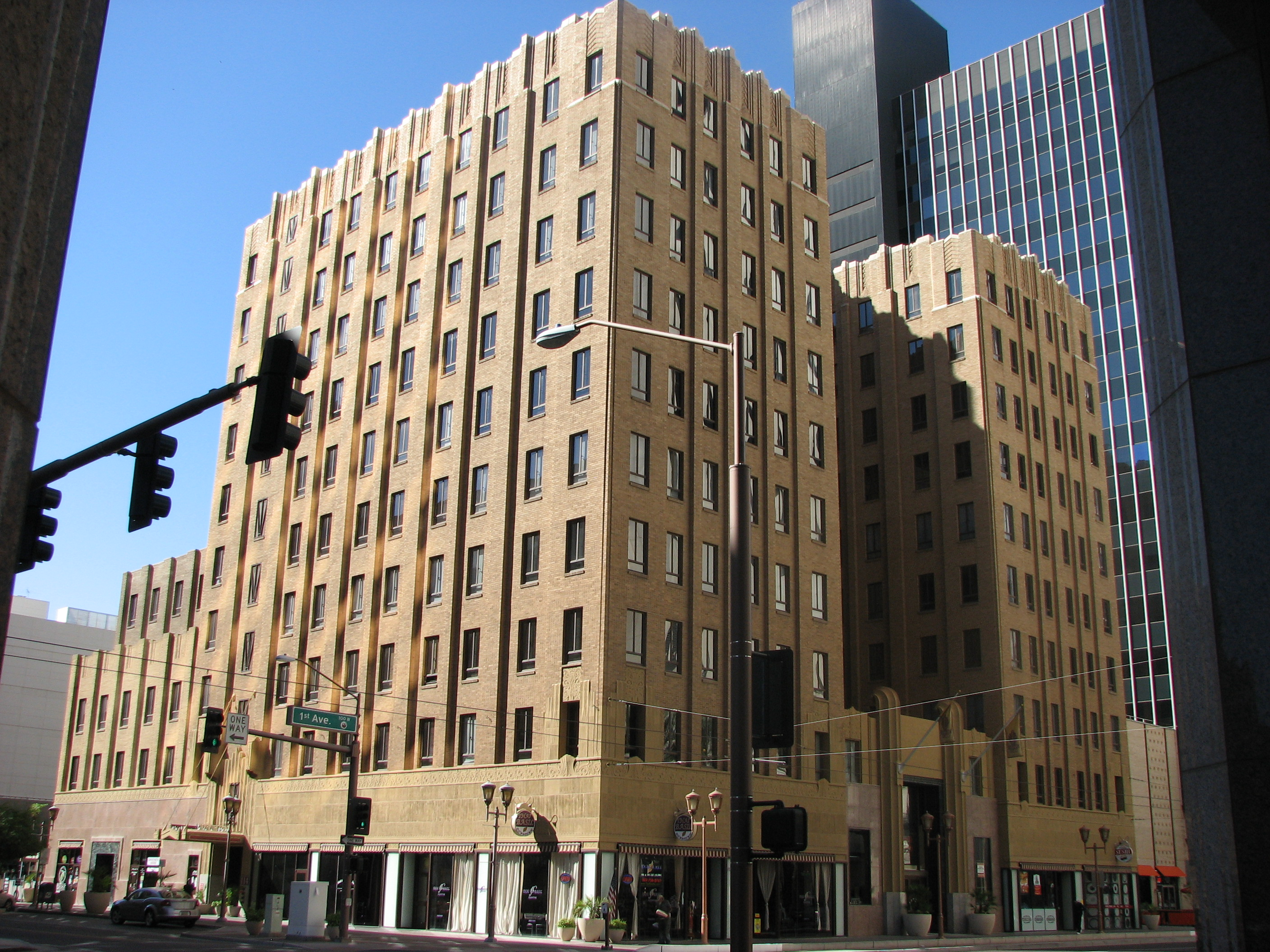
- Southeast corner of the Orpheum Lofts

- Location within Arizona

General information
- Type: Residential / Retail
- Location: 114 W. Adams Street Phoenix, Arizona
- Coordinates: 33.4494°N 112.0754°W
- Opened: January 31, 1931
- Renovated: 1954, 2004
- Cost: $650,000

Technical details
- Floor count: 11
- Floor area: 137,734 ft^{2}
- Lifts/elevators: 3

Design and construction
- Architect: Lescher & Mahoney
- Main contractor: William Simpson Construction Company

Renovating team
- Architect: Josh Comfort / The Lawrence Group
- Main contractor: The Weitz Company
- Orpheum Lofts
- U.S. National Register of Historic Places
- Built: 1930
- Architect: Lescher & Mahoney
- Architectural style: Moderne, Art Deco
- MPS: Phoenix Commercial MRA
- NRHP reference No.: 85002076
- Added to NRHP: September 4, 1985

The Orpheum Lofts (originally the Title and Trust Building) is an 11-story high-rise building in Phoenix, Arizona, designed in Art Deco style by local architects Lescher & Mahoney. It was the largest office building in Arizona at the time of its construction in 1930. The grand opening took place on January 31, 1931.

== History ==
The building is located at 114 West Adams Street in downtown Phoenix. The bricks used in the facade were specially made in California and are progressively lighter in color from bottom to top. A neon sign located on the north side that advertised the 'Phoenix Titles & Trust Co' was a prominent feature for many years.

The site was originally occupied by the 2-story O'Neill Building which was constructed around 1900 and housed early Phoenix lawyers O'Neill and McKean, and later the Arizona Industrial Congress. The building was razed in 1929 to make way for construction of the Title and Trust Building which was expected to cost $650,000. William Simpson Construction Company of Los Angeles built the 11 story building.

Transamerica Title Insurance Co. acquired the building in 1959 when it bought controlling interest in the Phoenix Title & Trust Co. The building was sold during March 1969, by Transamerica to T & T Building Associates for $2,000,000.

The building was listed on the National Register of Historic Places on September 4, 1985, as part of the Phoenix Commercial MRA (multiple resource area).

First Interstate Bancorp, later bought out by Wells Fargo, was the main tenant for many years during which time vacancy in the building increased substantially. By 1997, the building was occupied by a scant 35 employees and all but five worked for Wells Fargo. In July 1997, the bank moved their employees to a new facility across the street in the First Interstate Bank Plaza. Soon after, the remaining tenants followed suit.

By 1998 the building was vacant and on the market. BRE Properties, a San Francisco real estate company, purchased the building and had plans to turn it into 90 multifamily luxury apartments. Expected renovation costs were about $13 million; however, the renovation never occurred and the building was resold to TASB LLC., a Denver-based developer in 1999 who had plans to convert the building into condominiums.

=== 1954 Renovations ===
During 1954, architects Lescher & Mahoney designed a 3-story annex to the rear of the main building which stretched the full width of the property and was designed to handle an extra seven stories on top if ever needed. This would have brought the addition to the same height as the main structure.

Construction began on the addition in January 1955, with planned completion in July of the same year. The addition also had a basement with a photography lab and two dark rooms. The first floor had doors connecting to the lobby of the main structure as well as street accessible doors. The second floor was used as office space for Title & Trust. Half of the third floor housed a cafeteria for building employees, while the other half was a general assembly room for conferences and connected to the cafeteria with accordion doors which could effectively double the space if needed. Total cost for land and construction were $500,000.

=== 2004 Renovations ===
The 1954 annex was almost entirely demolished in 2003 leaving only a portion facing Adams street still standing. During the 2004 renovations, an additional two stories were added to the top of the remaining annex.

A marketing campaign was initiated in August 2002, and a sales office in the building was opened offering 90 loft condominiums ranging in size from 700 to 1800 square feet. The building premiered on November 21, 2002, as the Orpheum Lofts, taking their name from the nearby Orpheum Theatre, though it was not completed until 2005. Josh Comfort of Lawrence Group Architects in Denver was the lead architect. The Weitz Company of Phoenix was the general contractor for the renovation.

Though the actual renovations began in 2002, the majority of work commenced during the summer of 2004 when the building was gutted and new central cooling and heating was installed. Additionally, the lofts were framed, new plumbing and electrical was run and sidewalks along First Avenue and Adams Street were redone. Detail work included inlay tile work around the main entrance that showcased the name of the building; Orpheum Lofts. An open-air courtyard and water feature were added on the 3rd-floor deck overlooking First Street. Other amenities include a pool, spa, and fitness center which are located in the basement. A penthouse with roof access occupies the entire eleventh floor.

The first residents moved into the building in January 2005.

== Popular culture ==
The opening sequence of the 1960 Alfred Hitchcock film Psycho was filmed from the roof of this building.
