= Lescher & Mahoney =

Architectural firm based in Phoenix, Arizona

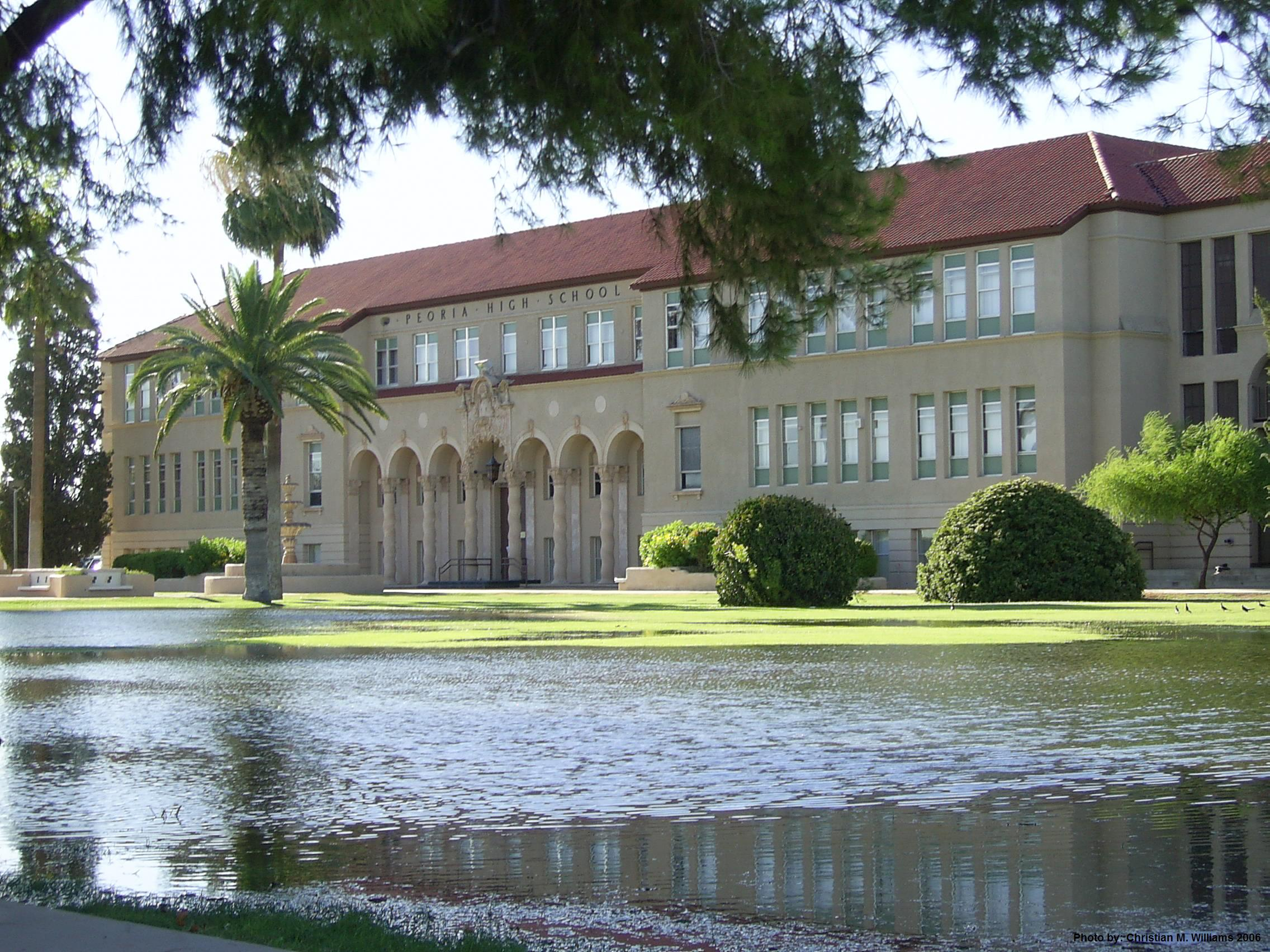
Peoria High School, Peoria, Arizona. 1921–22.

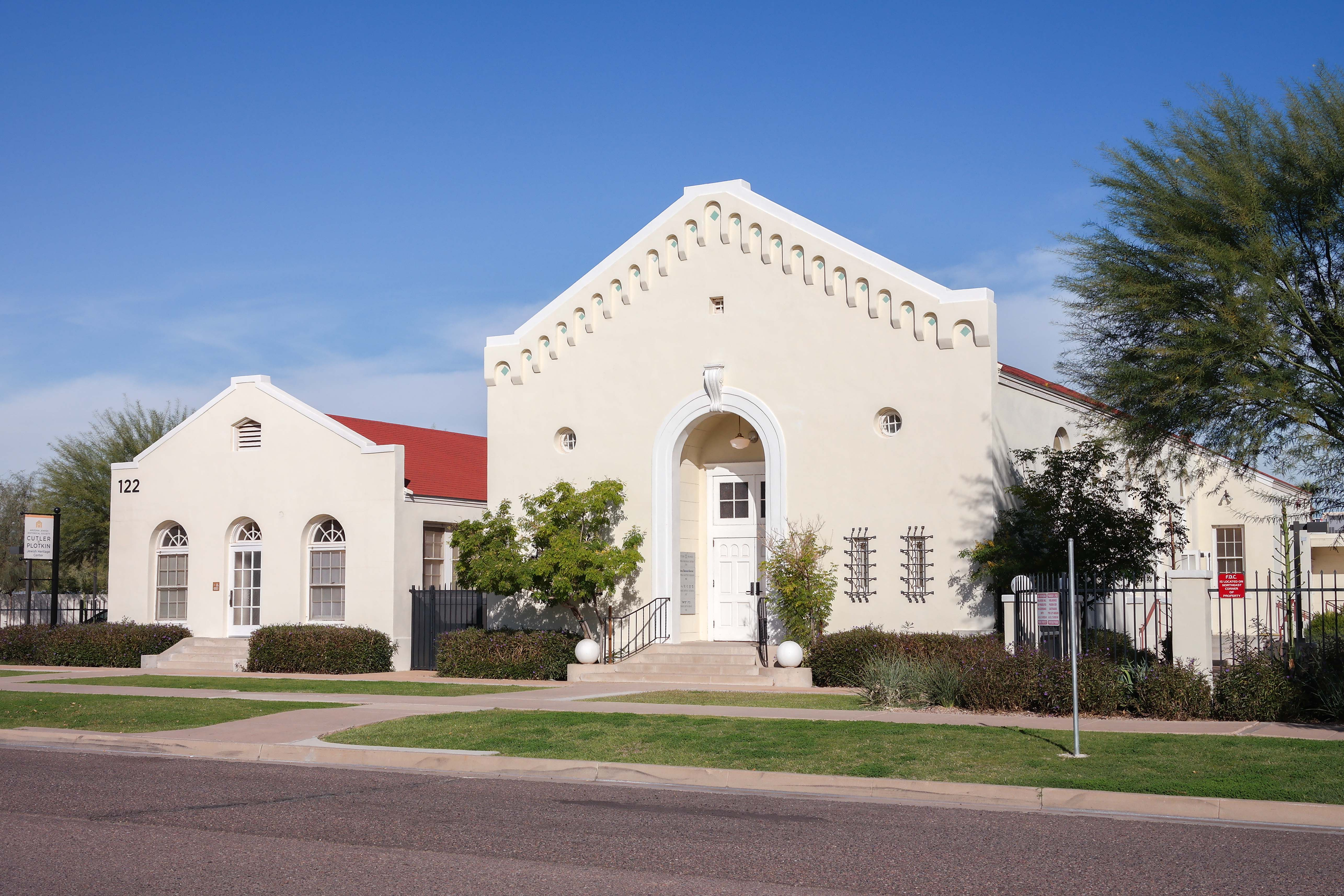
Temple Beth Israel, Phoenix, Arizona. 1921–22.

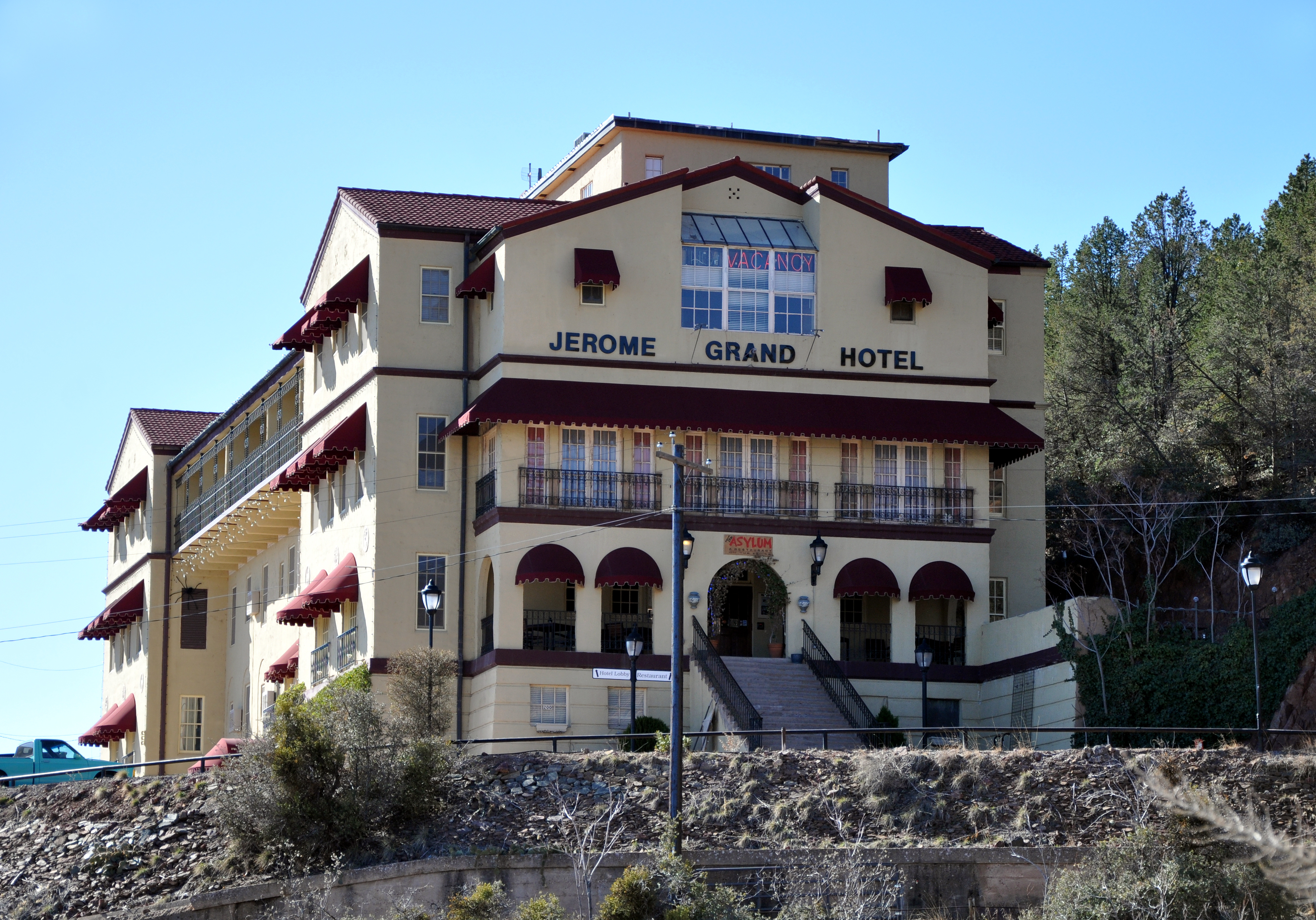
United Verde Hospital, Jerome, Arizona. 1926–27.

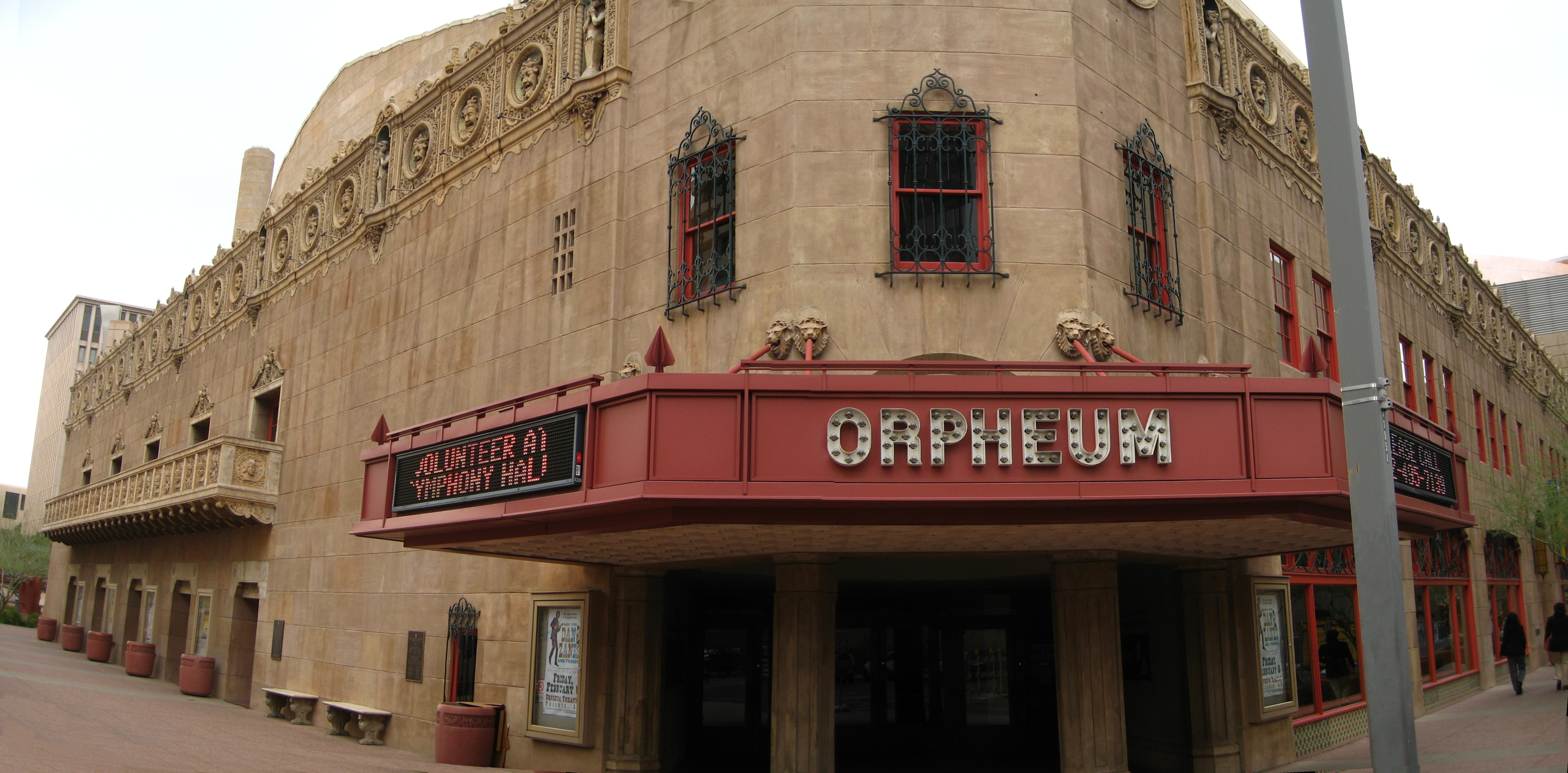
Orpheum Theatre, Phoenix, Arizona. 1927–29.

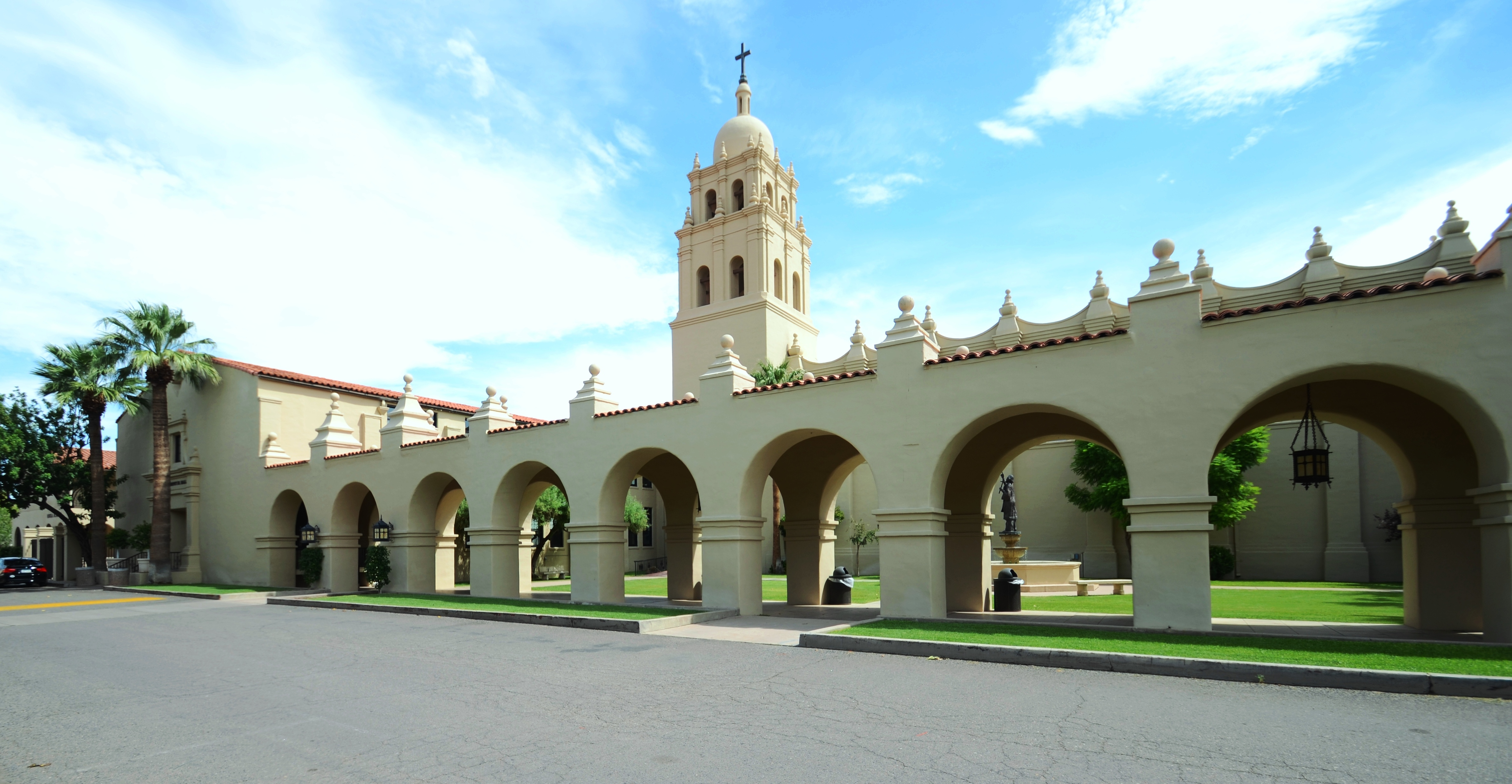
Brophy College Chapel, Phoenix, Arizona. 1928.

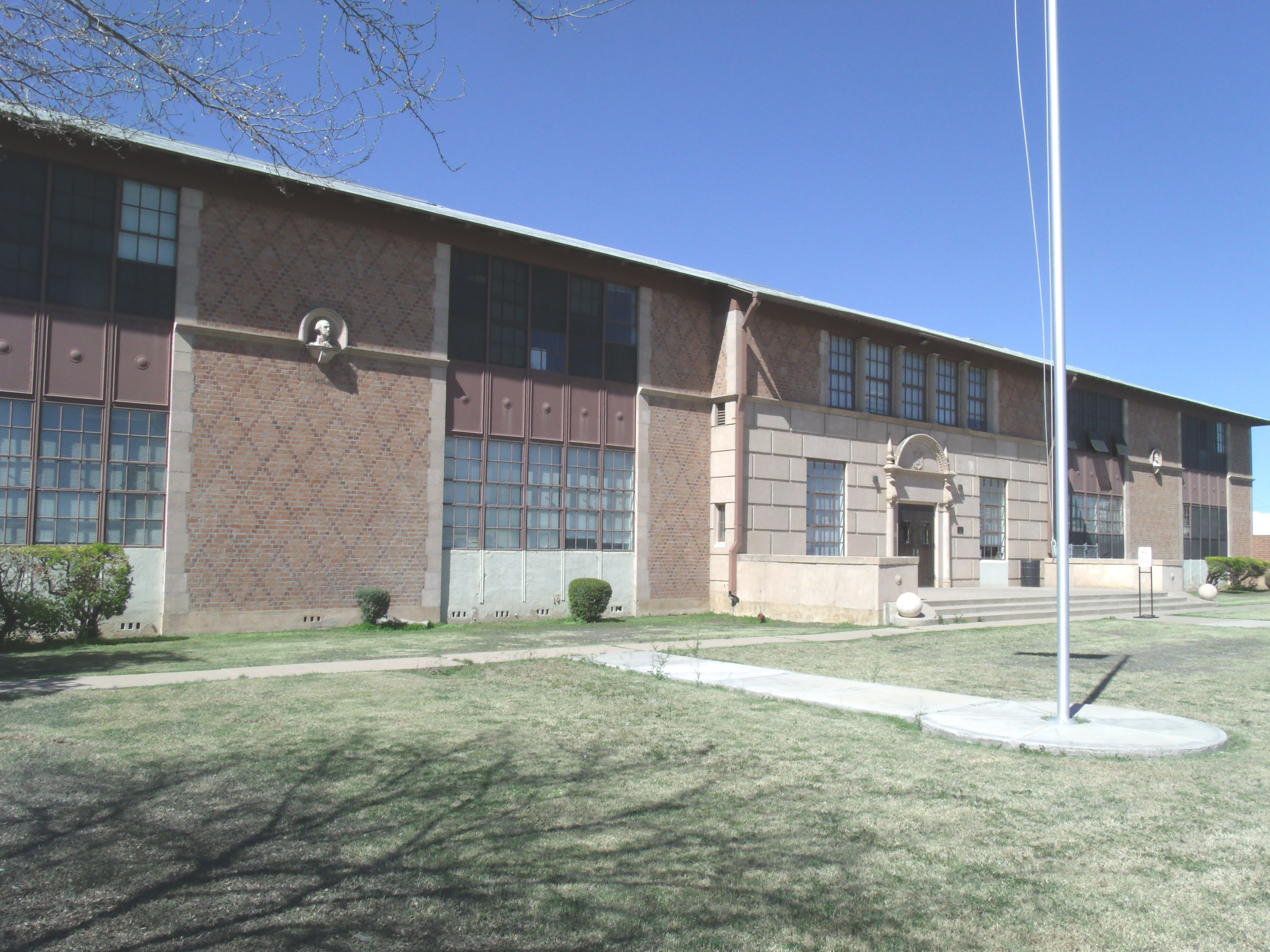
John G. Whittier School, Phoenix, Arizona. 1929.

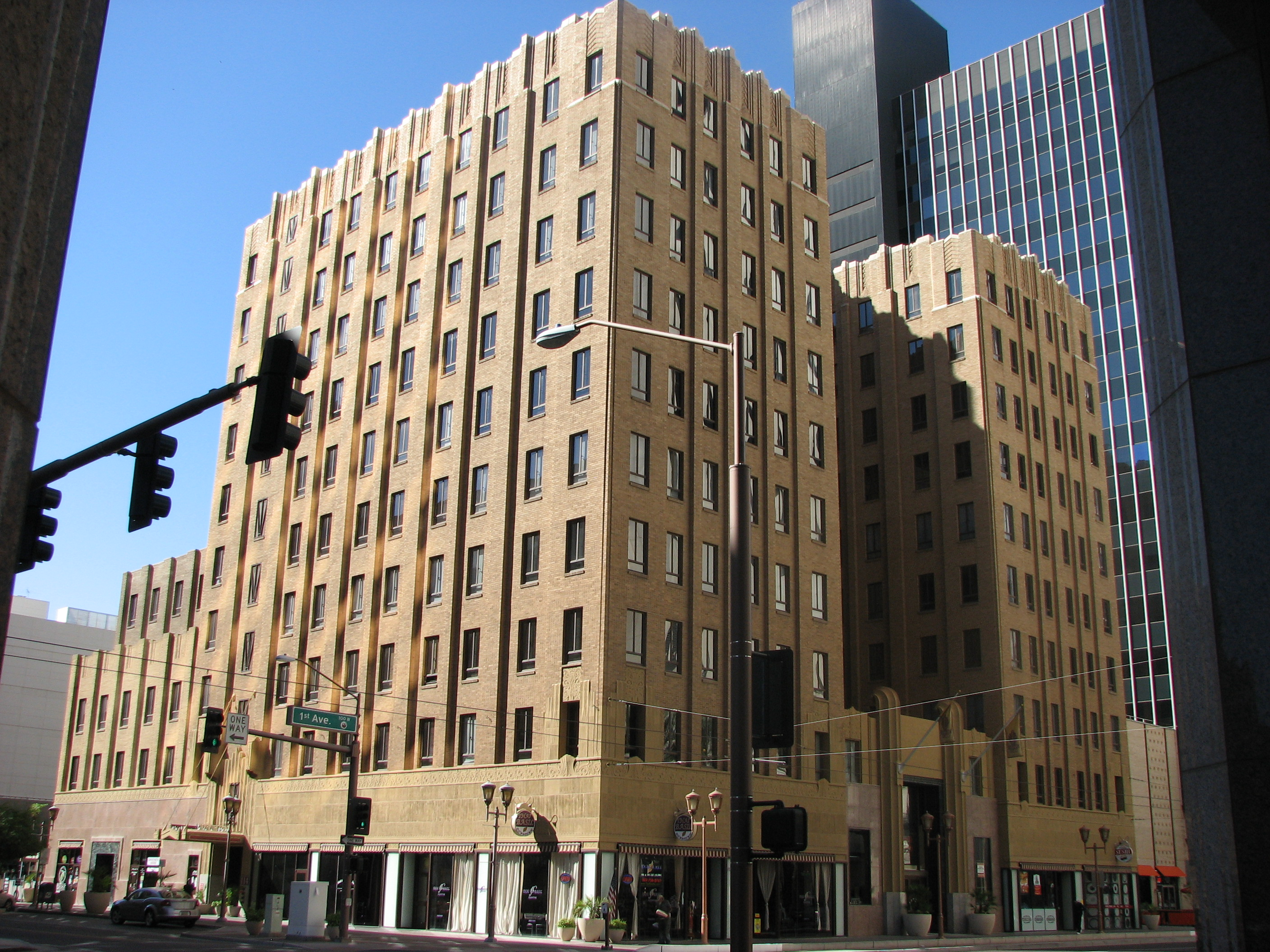
Phoenix Title and Trust Building, Phoenix, Arizona. 1930–31.

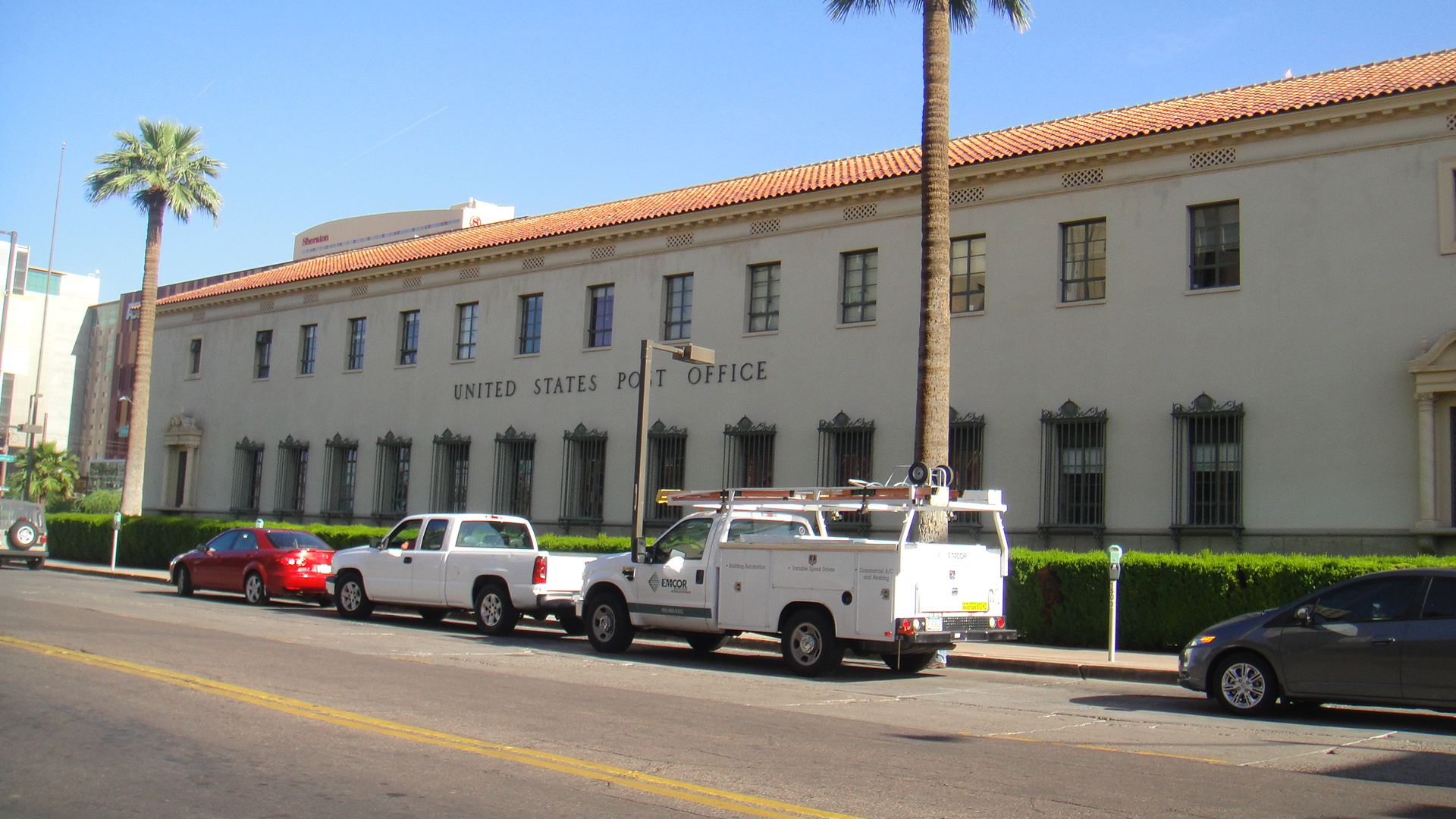
U. S. Post Office, Phoenix, Arizona. 1932–36.

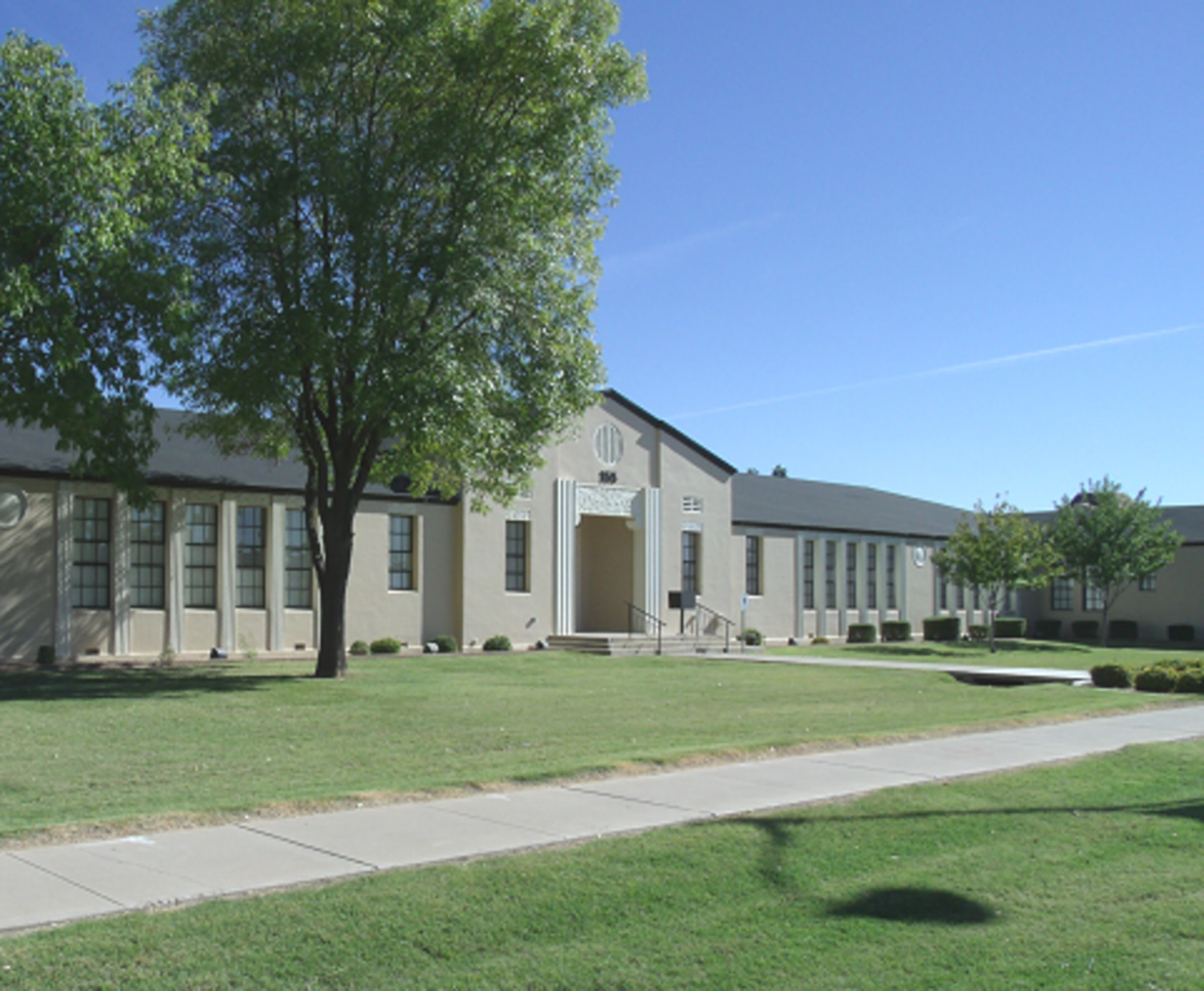
Irving School, Mesa, Arizona. 1936.

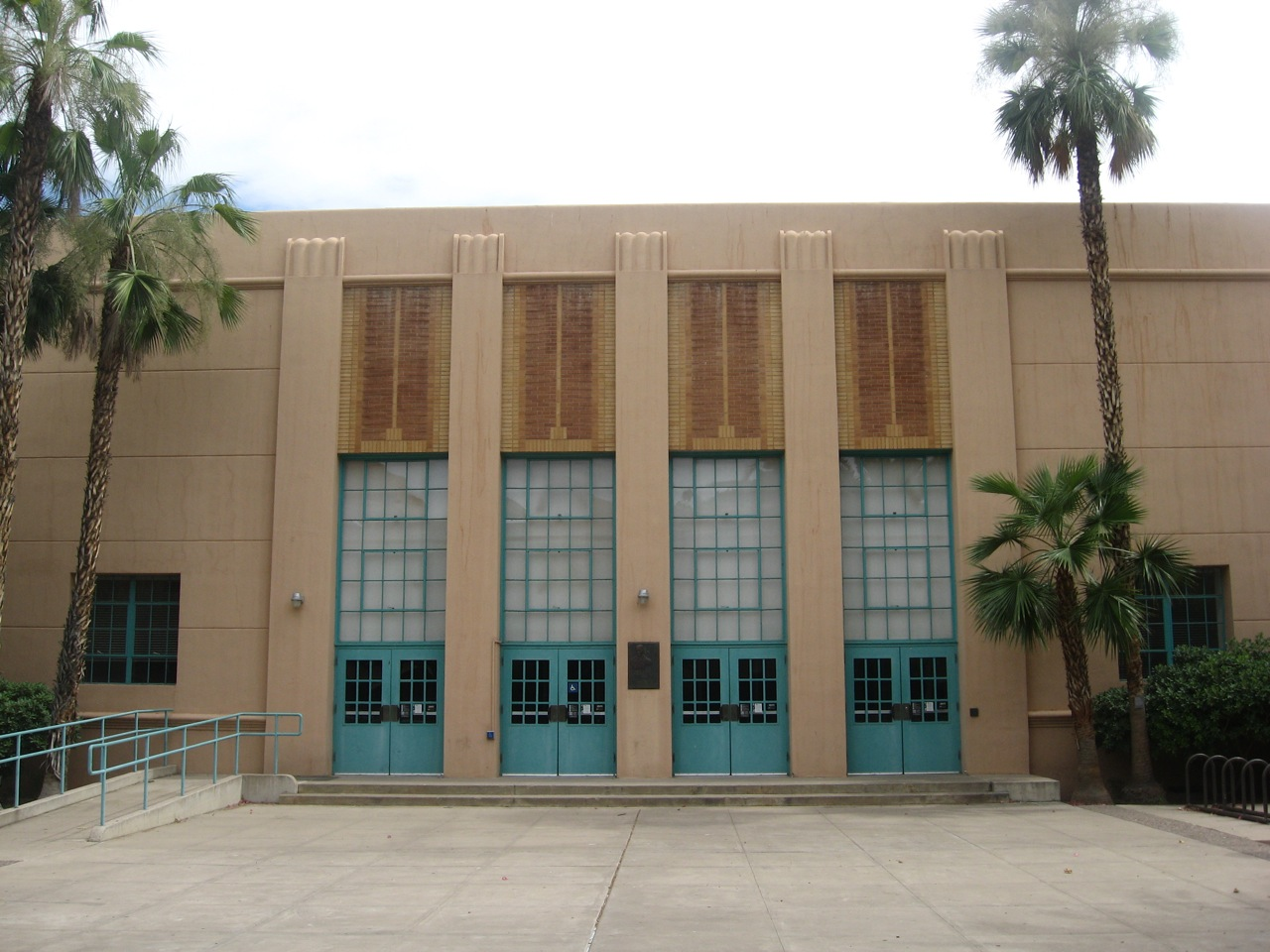
B. B. Moeur Activity Building, Arizona State Teachers College, Tempe, Arizona. 1936–39

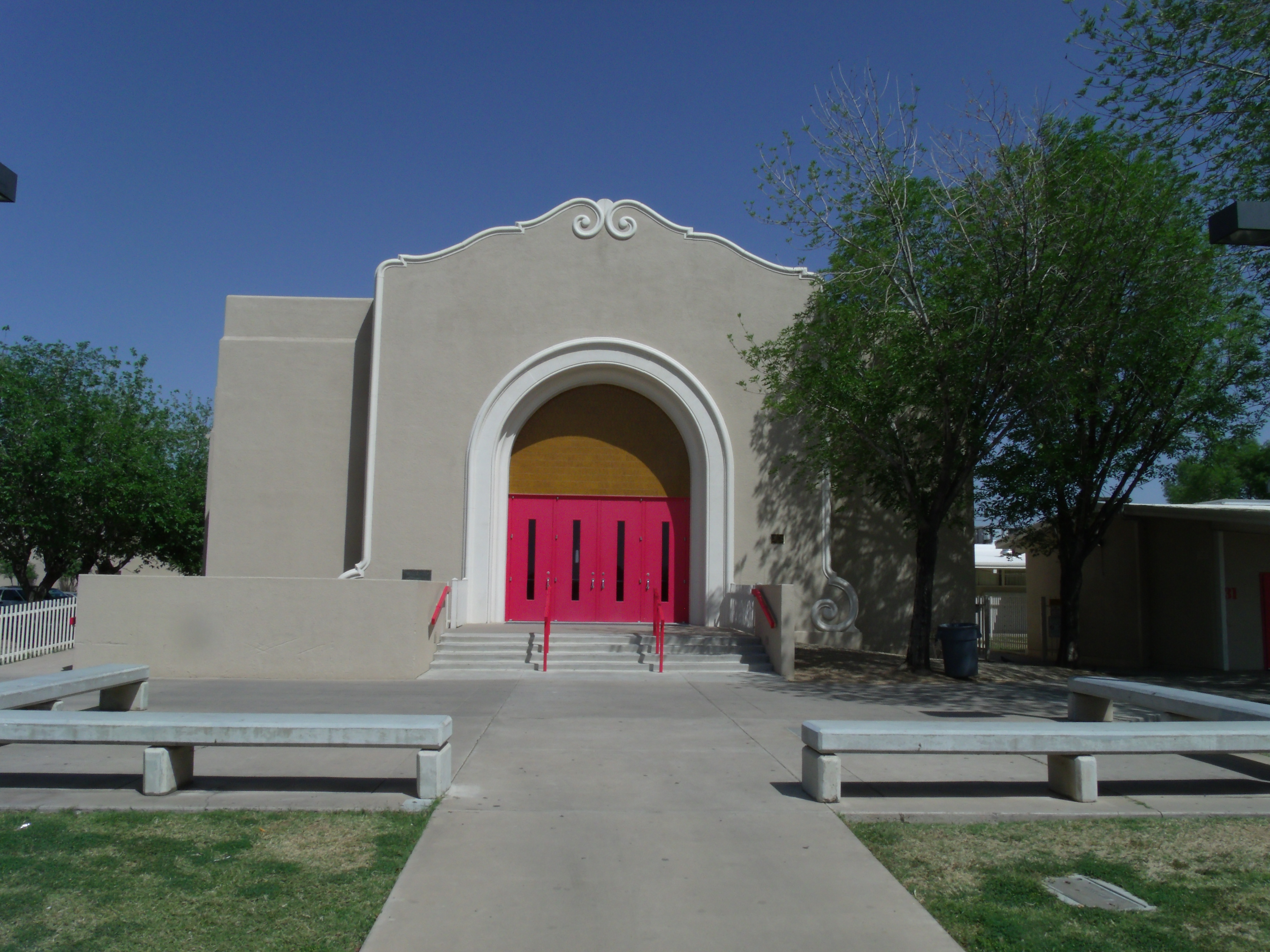
Glendale High School Auditorium, Glendale, Arizona. 1939.

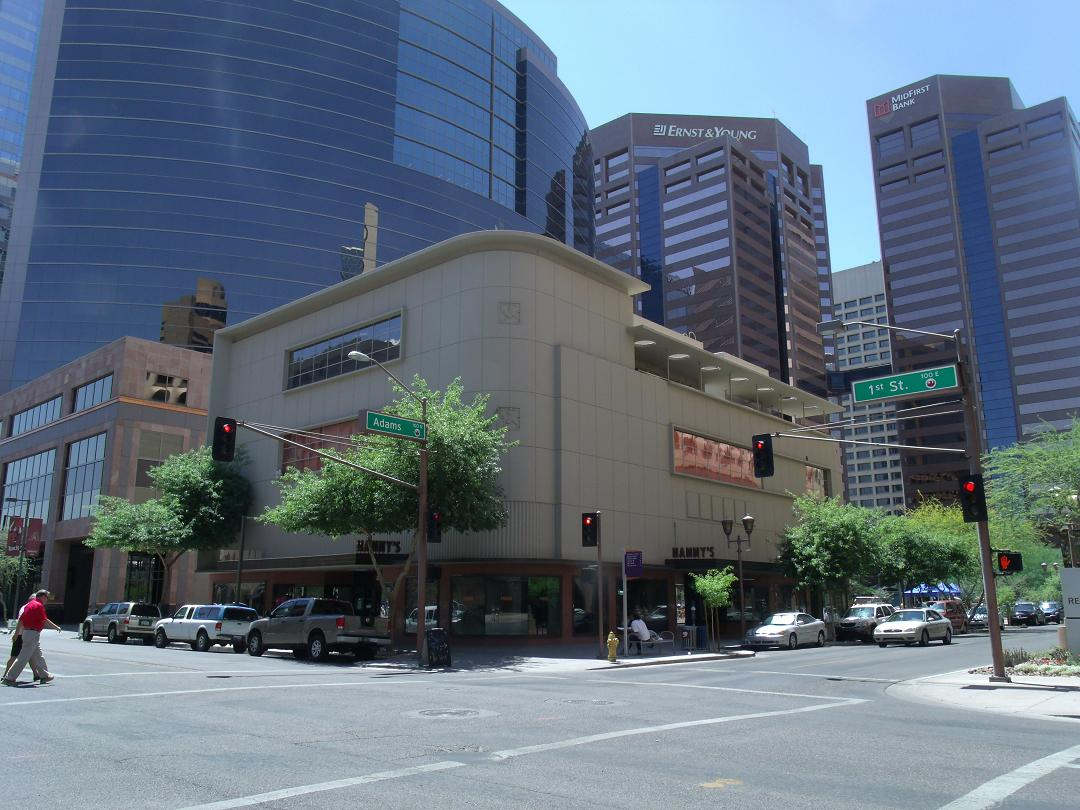
Hanny's Store, Phoenix, Arizona. 1947.

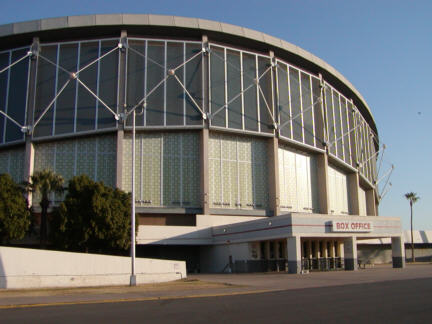
Arizona Veterans Memorial Coliseum, Arizona State Fairgrounds, Phoenix, Arizona. 1964–65.

Lescher & Mahoney was an American architectural firm from Phoenix, Arizona.

== History ==
The firm was established in 1910 by Royal W. Lescher (1882–1957). Lescher practiced alone until 1912, when he took John R. Kibbey (1883–1963) as a partner, forming Lescher & Kibbey.

In 1917 Leslie J. Mahoney (1892–1985) joined the firm as a designer. He was promoted to partner in 1921. The new firm, Lescher, Kibbey & Mahoney, was dissolved in 1922 when Kibbey left to design movie sets in Hollywood. The resulting partnership of Lescher & Mahoney survived until Lescher's death in 1957. However, Mahoney retained the name until his retirement in 1975, when the firm was sold. It was acquired by DLR Group of Omaha. Again, the name was retained and Lescher & Mahoney continued to operate semi-autonomously until 1998, when the firm was fully merged into DLR.

Many of the firm's works are listed on the National Register of Historic Places.

== Selected architectural works ==
=== Royal W. Lescher, 1910–1912 ===
- Florence Woman's Club, 231 Willow St., Florence, Arizona (1911)
- Hotel Luhrs, 2 E. Jefferson St., Phoenix, Arizona (1911) – Demolished.

=== Lescher & Kibbey, 1912–1921 ===
- Buckeye Courthouse, 218 S. 4th St., Buckeye, Arizona (1912)
- Globe High School, S. High St., Globe, Arizona (1913–14)
- White-McCarthy Lumber and Hardware Store, 290 Main St., Florence, Arizona (1914)
- Duncan High School, Stadium Rd., Duncan, Arizona (1915)
- Florence High School, S. Main St., Florence, Arizona (1915–16)
- Mohave County Courthouse, 310 N. 4th St. Kingman, Arizona (1915)
- James S. Douglas, Jr. House, Douglas Rd., Jerome, Arizona (1916)
- Elks Lodge, 650 E. 10th St., Douglas, Arizona (1916)
- Graham County Courthouse, 800 W. Main St., Safford, Arizona (1916)
- Salt River Valley Bank Building, W. Main St., Mesa, Arizona (1916) – Demolished 1978
- Hotel Beale (Remodeling), 325 E. Andy Devine Ave., Kingman, Arizona (1916)
- Little Daisy Hotel, Upper Bell Rd., Jerome, Arizona (1917–18) – Standing but in ruins.
- Curley School, 201 W. Esperanza Ave., Ajo, Arizona (1918)
- Maricopa Hall, University of Arizona, Tucson, Arizona (1918–20) – Assisted by Lyman & Place.
- Blome Building, Northern Arizona Normal School, Flagstaff, Arizona (1920)
- George Kingdon House, 200 Lower Bell Rd., Jerome, Arizona (1920)
- Solomon Elementary School, S. Stevens Ave., Solomon, Arizona (1920)
- Union Verde Hospital (First), 123 Hill St., Jerome, Arizona (1920)

=== Lescher, Kibbey & Mahoney, 1921–1922 ===
- Phoenix Union High School Liberal Arts Building, 512 E. Van Buren St., Phoenix, Arizona (1921) – Demolished.
- Clubhouse, Phoenix Country Club, 2901 N. 7th St., Phoenix, Arizona (1921) – Demolished.
- El Zaribah Shrine Auditorium, 1502 W. Washington St., Phoenix, Arizona (1921)
- Peoria High School, N. 83rd Ave., Peoria, Arizona (1921–22)
- Temple Beth Israel, 122 E. Culver St., Phoenix, Arizona (1921)
- Jerome High School (Old), 85 Hampshire Ave., Jerome, Arizona (1922–23)
- Scottsdale High School, 7324 E. Indian School Rd., Scottsdale, Arizona (1922–23) – Demolished.

=== Lescher & Mahoney, 1922–1975 ===
- St. Mary's Elementary School, 231 N. 3rd St., Phoenix, Arizona (1925) – Demolished
- El Portal Hotel (Maricopa Inn), 20 E. Main St., Mesa, Arizona (1925–26) – Demolished 1975.
- Union Verde Hospital (Second), 200 Hill St., Jerome, Arizona (1926–27)
- Federated Church, 101 Lomita Ave., Ajo, Arizona (1926-27)
- Orpheum Theater, 209 W. Adams St., Phoenix, Arizona (1927–29)
- Brophy College Chapel, 4701 N. Central Ave. Phoenix, Arizona (1928)
- Knights of Pythias Building, 829 N. 1st Ave., Phoenix, Arizona (1928)
- Phoenix City Hall, 125 W. Washington St., Phoenix, Arizona (1928–29) – With Edward F. Neild.
- Buckeye Union High School, 902 E. Easton Ave., Buckeye, Arizona (1928)
- Sacred Heart Catholic Church, 272 N. Rodriguez St., Nogales, Arizona (1928)
- Scottsdale Grammar School No. 2, 3720 N. Marshall Way, Scottsdale, Arizona (1928)
- John M. Ross House, 6722 N. Central Ave., Phoenix, Arizona (1929)
- John G. Whittier School, 2000 N. 16th St., Phoenix, Arizona (1929)
- Phoenix Motor Company Building (now The Van Buren) 401 W. Van Buren St., Phoenix, Arizona (1929-30)
- Arizona State Building, 1688 W. Adams St., Phoenix, Arizona (1930)
- Phoenix Title and Trust Building, 114 W. Adams St., Phoenix, Arizona (1930–31, 1955)
- U. S. Post Office, 522 N. Central Ave., Phoenix, Arizona (1932–36)
- Wickenburg High School Gymnasium, 252 S. Tegner St., Wickenburg, Arizona (1934)
- Sombrero Ranch, 790 W. Bralliar Rd, Wickenburg, Arizona (1936)
- Irving School, 155 N. Center St., Mesa, Arizona (1936)
- B. B. Moeur Activity Building, Arizona State Teachers College, Tempe, Arizona (1936–39)
- West Hall, Arizona State Teachers College, Tempe, Arizona (1936-37)
- Goodwin Stadium, Arizona State Teachers College, Tempe, Arizona (1936, 1940-41) – Demolished.
- Mesa City Hall (now the Arizona Museum of Natural History) 53 N. MacDonald., Mesa, Arizona (1937)
- Montague House, Windsor Square, Phoenix, Arizona (1938)
- McCullough-Price House, 300 S. Chandler Village Dr., Chandler, Arizona, (1938) – With J. W. Mougeot
- Phelps Dodge Mercantile Company Building, 2 Copper Queen Plaza., Bisbee, Arizona (1939)
- Cottonwood Civic Center, 805 N. Main St., Cottonwood, Arizona (1939)
- Glendale High School Auditorium, 6216 W. Glendale Ave., Glendale, Arizona (1939)
- Phoenix College, Phoenix, Arizona (1939)
- Irish Hall, Arizona State Teachers College, Tempe, Arizona (1940-41)
- Marcos de Niza Public Housing, N. 3rd Ave. and W Pima St., Phoenix, Arizona (1941)
- Denison Kitchell House, 2912 E. Sherran Ln., Phoenix, Arizona (1941–42)
- Basic Magnesium Plant town site plan, Henderson, Nevada (1942)
- Palms Theater, Phoenix, Arizona (1945) – With William Pereira – Demolished
- Sciences Building (Discovery Hall), Arizona State College, Tempe, Arizona (1946–48)
- VA Medical Center, 650 E. Indian School Rd., Phoenix, Arizona (1946–49)
- Hanny's Department Store, 40 N. 1st St., Phoenix, Arizona (1947)
- MacAlpine's Pharmacy Building Addition 2305-2309 N. 7th St, Phoenix, Arizona (1948)
- Central Methodist Church, 1875 N. Central Ave., Phoenix, Arizona (1950)
- Funk's Jewelry Store, Downtown Phoenix, Arizona (1950) – Demolished
- North Union/Prochnow Auditorium, Arizona State College, Flagstaff, Arizona (1951–52)
- St. Joseph's Hospital, 350 W. Thomas Rd., Phoenix, Arizona (1951–53)
- West Terminal (Terminal 1), Sky Harbor Airport, Phoenix, Arizona (1951–52) – Demolished.
- First Methodist Church, 5510 N. Central Ave., Phoenix, Arizona (1952)
- Lincoln Family YMCA, 350 N. 1st Ave., Phoenix, Arizona (1952)
- Phoenix Public Library (Old) Central Branch, 12 E. Mcdowell Rd., Phoenix, Arizona (1953) – With Alden B. Dow – Largely demolished.
- Coffelt-Lamoreaux Housing Development, S. 19th Ave and W. Buckeye Rd, Phoenix, Arizona (1954)
- Arizona State Laboratory Building (now Joint Legislative Budget Committee) 1716 W. Adams St., Phoenix, Arizona (1954)
- House and Senate Buildings, Arizona State Capitol, Phoenix, Arizona (1956–60) – With Place & Place.
- Carl Hayden High School, 3333 W. Roosevelt St., Phoenix Arizona (1957)
- Babbitt Hall, Arizona State College, Flagstaff, Arizona (1957)
- Peterson Hall, Arizona State College, Flagstaff, Arizona (1958)
- Blue Cross Blue Shield Building, 311 W. Indian School Rd., Phoenix, Arizona (c. 1958) – Demolished
- Sacred Heart Home for the Aged (now Garfield Commons) 1110 N. 16th St., Phoenix, Arizona (1958–60)
- East Terminal (Terminal 2), Sky Harbor Airport, Phoenix, Arizona (1959–60) – With Weaver & Drover.
- Arizona Industrial Commission Building (now Arizona State Land Dept.) 1616 W. Adams St., Phoenix, Arizona (1960–61)
- U. S. Federal Building, 230 N. 1st Ave., Phoenix, Arizona (1959–61) – With Edward L. Varney Associates.
- Barrow Neurological Institute, 350 W. Thomas Rd., Phoenix, Arizona (1961)
- Lescher & Mahoney Office, 407 W. Osborn Rd., Phoenix, Arizona (1963)
- Memorial Towers Senior Apartments, 1405 S. 7th Ave., Phoenix, Arizona (1963–64)
- Health Center Building, Arizona State College, Flagstaff, Arizona (1964)
- Arizona Veterans Memorial Coliseum, Arizona State Fairgrounds, Phoenix, Arizona (1964–65) – With Place & Place.
- American Red Cross Building, 1510 E. Flower St., Phoenix, Arizona (1967)
- Morenci Copper Mining Staff Housing, Morenci, Arizona (1967)
- Maricopa County General Hospital, 2601 E. Roosevelt St., Phoenix, Arizona (1967–68) – Will be demolished.
- Phoenix Indian Hospital, 4212 N. 16th St., Phoenix, Arizona (1967-1970)
- Morinci Club, Theater and Library, Plaza Dr., Morinci, Arizona (1970)
- Executive Tower, Arizona State Capitol, Phoenix, Arizona (1974) – With Lew Place and Edward L. Varney Associates.

=== Lescher & Mahoney (DLR), 1975–1998 ===
- Flagstaff Municipal Complex, W. Aspen Ave., Flagstaff, Arizona, (1979–82) – With Bert Bender
- Gilbert Community Center, E. Bruce Ave., Gilbert, Arizona (1981–82)
- Douglas County Public Library, 1625 Library Ln., Minden, Nevada (1982)
- Gabaldon Hall, Northern Arizona University, Flagstaff, Arizona (1982–84)
- Highland Executive Park, 4701 N. 24th St., Phoenix, Arizona (1983)
- Laguna Elementary School, E. Lakeview Dr., Scottsdale, Arizona (1986)
- Paradise Valley Community College, Phoenix, Arizona (1985–87)
- Bateman Physical Science Center H-Wing, Arizona State University, Tempe, Arizona (1986–88)
- Tropicana Field, St. Petersburg, Florida (1986–90)
- Sinagua Middle School, E. Butler Ave., Flagstaff, Arizona (1987–88) – With RSG Architects
- Sequoya Elementary School, N. 64th St., Scottsdale, Arizona (1988)
- Maricopa County Southeast Public Service Facility, 222 E. Javelina Ave., Mesa, Arizona (1989–90)
- Hammond Stadium, Fort Myers, Florida (1989–91)
- L. P. Frans Stadium, Hickory, North Carolina (1992–93)
- ADX Florence, Fremont County, Colorado (1993)
- CMC-NorthEast Stadium, Kannapolis, North Carolina (1994–95)
- Phoenix Art Museum (Expansion), 1625 N. Central Ave., Phoenix, Arizona (1994–96) – With Tod Williams Billie Tsien
- George M. Steinbrenner Field, Tampa, Florida (1994–96)
- UPMC Park (previously Jerry Uht Park), Erie, Pennsylvania (1994–95)
- Desert Mountain High School, E. Via Linda, Scottsdale, Arizona (1995)
- Reo Grande County Courthouse Annex, 965 6th St., Del Norte, Colorado (1997)
- Ocotillo Elementary School, 3225 W. Ocotillo Rd., Phoenix, Arizona (1997–98)
- Orangewood Elementary School, 7337 N. 19th Ave., Phoenix, Arizona (1997–98)
- Moon Mountain Elementary School, 13425 N. 19th Ave., Phoenix, Arizona (1997–98)
