= B. B. Moeur Activity Building =

Historic building on the ASU campus in Tempe, Arizona

- U.S. National Register of Historic Places
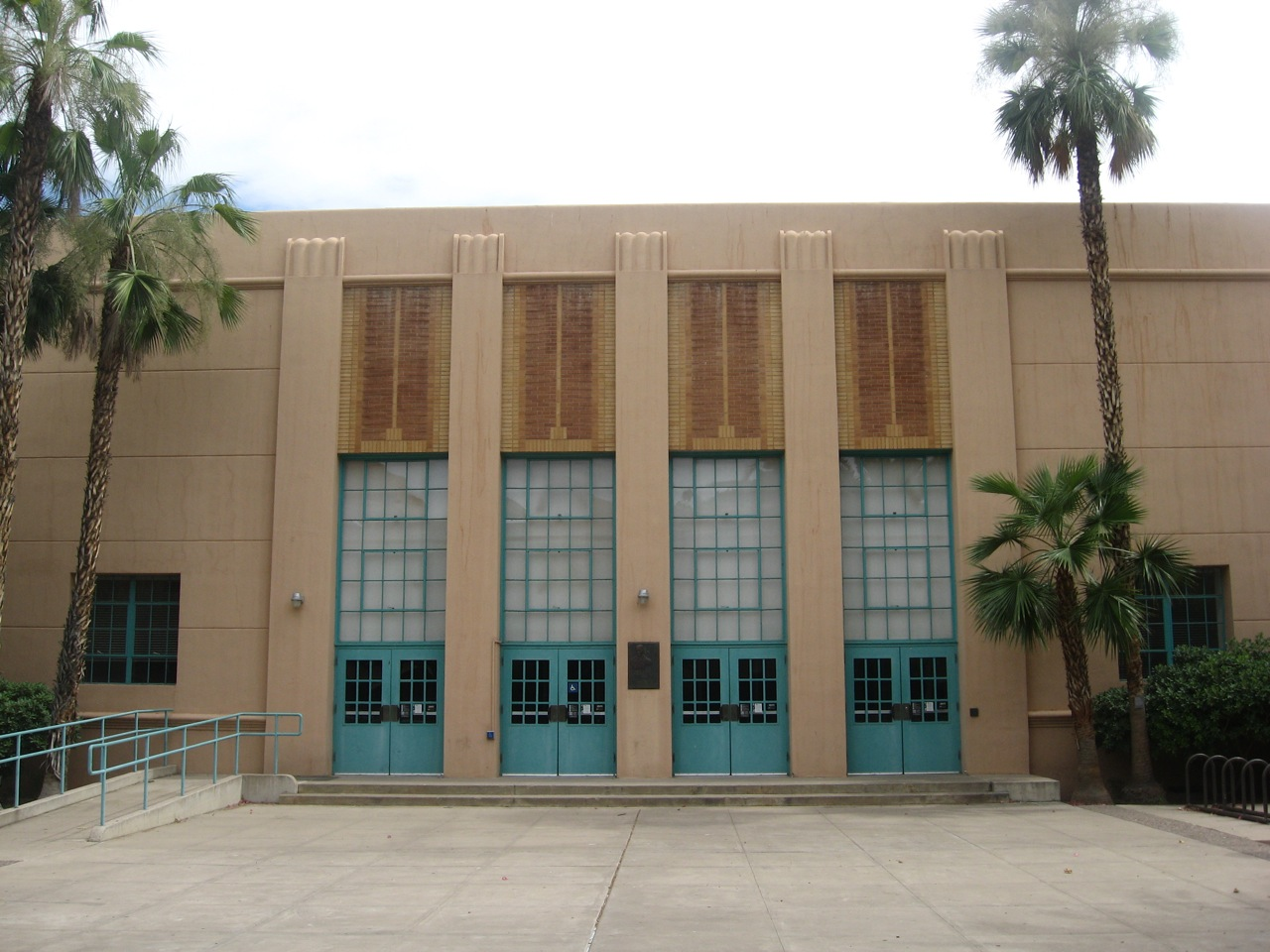

- Location within Arizona Location within the United States
- Location: 201 E. Orange Mall, Tempe, Arizona
- Coordinates: 33°25′4″N 111°56′7″W
- Area: less than one acre
- Built: 1936
- Architect: Lescher & Mahoney
- Architectural style: Moderne, Federal Moderne
- MPS: Tempe MRA
- NRHP reference No.: 85002171
- Added to NRHP: September 11, 1985

The B. B. Moeur Activity Building is a structure on the campus of Arizona State University in Tempe, Arizona. Constructed from 1936 to 1939 by the Works Progress Administration, it was added to the National Register of Historic Places in September 1985, ahead of the typical 50-year requirement for National Register sites, for "exceptional" architectural and historical merit. It is the largest WPA-built adobe building in the state.

== History ==
The Moeur Building was built in the late 1930s and is "the largest structure of its kind to be built in Arizona by the labor of the [WPA]". The building is made of adobe in the Federal Moderne style, both unusual; it is one of the largest adobe buildings in the state, utilizing 50,000 adobe bricks and dating from an era when the WPA constructed many adobe structures (such as the Casa Grande Union High School gymnasium), while it is the only Federal Moderne building on the campus. The architect was the Arizona firm of Lescher & Mahoney. Many building materials were donated by Arizona firms.

The building was named for former governor of Arizona Benjamin Baker Moeur, who died two years before the project was completed. Governor Moeur spent two terms in office and was part of the state's Constitutional Convention, writing the sections of the Arizona Constitution that pertained to education.

The building was constructed as a women's activity center, containing a 6,800 square feet (630 m^{2}) auditorium/recreation room surrounded by a U-shaped corridor. The corridor features low relief panels on the walls and ceiling in geometric Moderne designs. Two wall murals have since been removed, one by Taliesin student Bruce Richards depicting modern dance and another by John Leeper depicting women in sports and art activities.

The building housed administrative offices for the expanding university after the 1960s, and it currently houses the Mars Space Flight Facility, a center for research on Mars.

== Architecture ==
The Moeur Building features ornamental features typical of the Moderne style, with linear designs in low relief. Stylized brick pilasters with fluted capitals add a vertical element to the central bay facade. The building's footprint is H-shaped, with each wing extending further to the north than the south.

Internally, concrete is used for the structure, with the walls infilled with adobe. No other structure in Arizona was built with this method.
