= United States Post Office (Phoenix, Arizona) =

- U.S. Post Office
- U.S. National Register of Historic Places
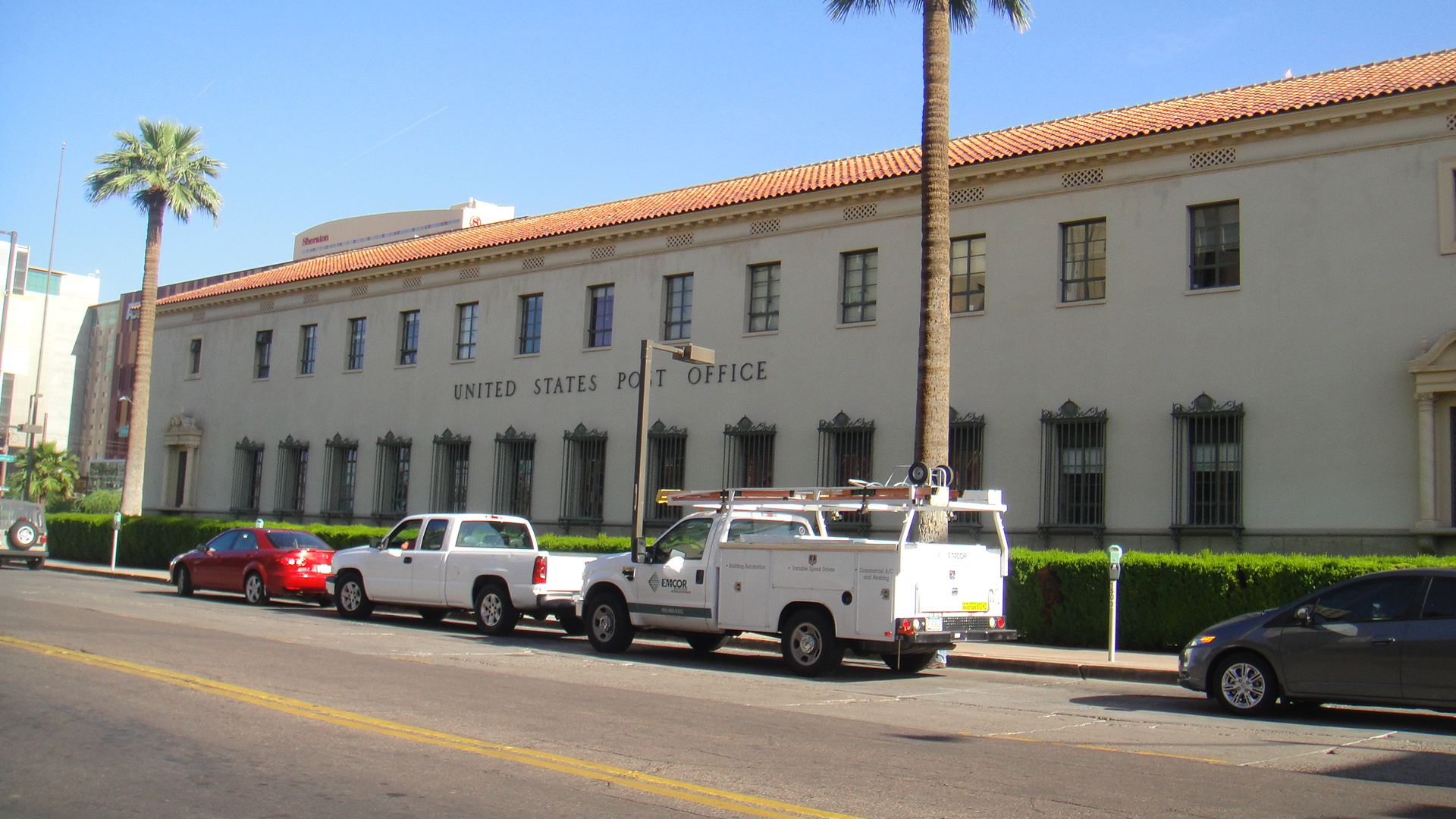
- The US Post Office building in downtown Phoenix

- Location within Arizona Location within the United States
- Location: 522 N. Central Ave., Phoenix, Arizona
- Coordinates: 33°27′16″N 112°4′28″W
- Area: 1.8 acres (0.73 ha)
- Built: 1932-1936
- Architect: Lescher and Mahoney
- Architectural style: Spanish Colonial Revival
- NRHP reference No.: 83002993
- Added to NRHP: February 10, 1983

The U.S. Post Office at 522 North Central Avenue at 1st Avenue and West Fillmore Street in Phoenix, Arizona, also known as the Federal Building-U.S. Post Office, is a building of the United States federal government that was built in 1932-1936 and designed by Lescher and Mahoney in the Spanish Colonial Revival style. It was added to the National Register of Historic Places in 1983. It is currently part of Arizona State University's Downtown Phoenix Campus, where it houses student organizations, counseling services, administrative offices and the ASU Police Department. A USPS location is situated on the first floor of the old post office.

== Significance ==
The Federal Building-U.S. Post Office in Phoenix, Arizona is significant on a local level in two areas: architecture and politics/government. A good example of federal architecture adapted to a regional tradition, in this case the Spanish Colonial Revival, the building was erected during the years 1932 to 1936. Part of an extensive federal building program initiated in the late 1920s, it housed the main post office of Phoenix for over thirty years, as well as the offices of the judiciary and several federal agencies. A few years after opening, murals commissioned by Treasury Department were installed in the lobby. Substantially intact, the Federal Building-Post Office continues to function as a post office branch and its tenants include the United States Tax Court and assorted federal entities.

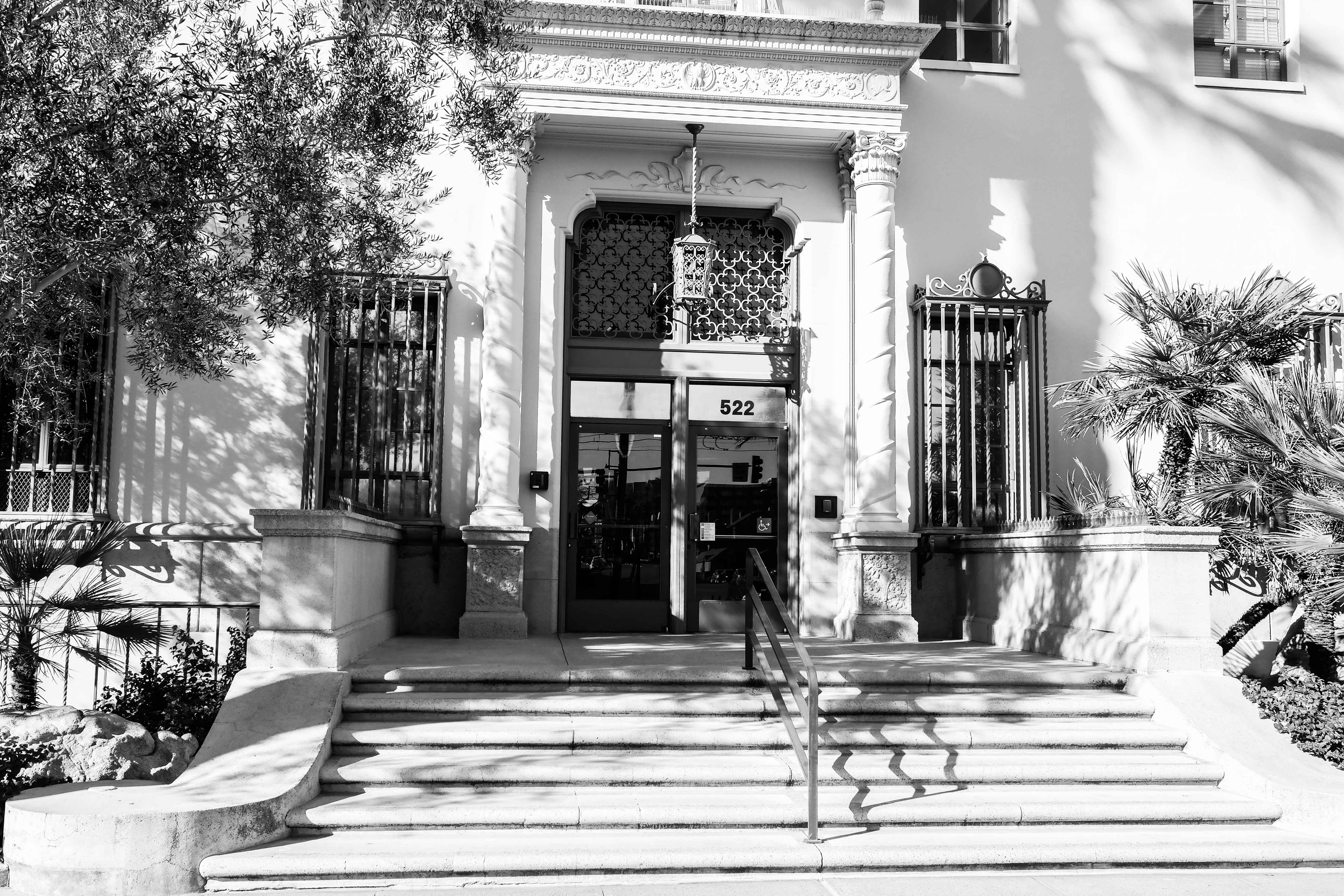
Main entrance in 2013

The construction of the Post Office marked Phoenix's rapid growth and its important position as the state capital. Founded in 1870–71, Phoenix had a series of post office facilities until 1913, when the U. S. Treasury Department built the Phoenix Post Office and Courthouse. By 1930, the city had outgrown the building, and Congress appropriated the funds for a new building. The Phoenix Federal Building would be one of the results of the massive federal building program underway at the time, partially in an attempt to combat the deepening Depression.

A site was chosen in 1931 and Phoenix architects Lescher and Mahoney were commissioned to design a six-story building that was intended to house all of the federal services in the city. Construction was begun on the foundations. For a variety of reasons, including the unexpectedly high cost of land acquisition, the design for a three-story rather than a six-story building was submitted to the Treasury Department for review. By the time construction bids were again sought, the building had assumed a Spanish Colonial Revival appearance and two story height. The building opened on September 29, 1936, of that year when the post office began operations in its new home.

A landmark in central Phoenix, the Federal Building-Post Office was symbolic of the federal presence in the city and a focus of local pride. It continues today in those capacities, although construction of a new post office in 1968 absorbed several of its tenants. The only federal building from the period remaining in the city, the Post Office possesses substantial architectural merit as an example of Spanish Colonial Revival design.

=== Murals ===
In 1938, the Fine Arts Section of the Treasury Department commissioned artists La Verne Black and Oscar E. Berninghaus to paint two murals each to embellish the public space of the office.

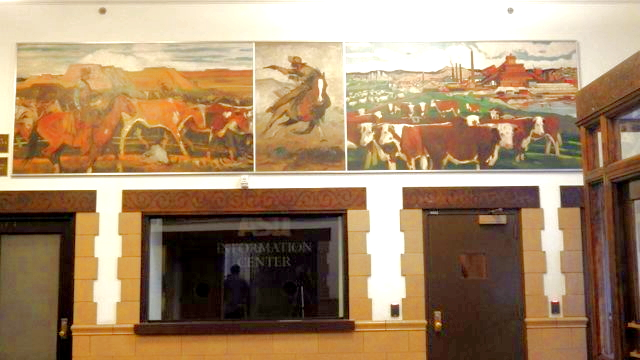
Progress of the Pioneer, Crossing the Desert by La Verne Nelson Black

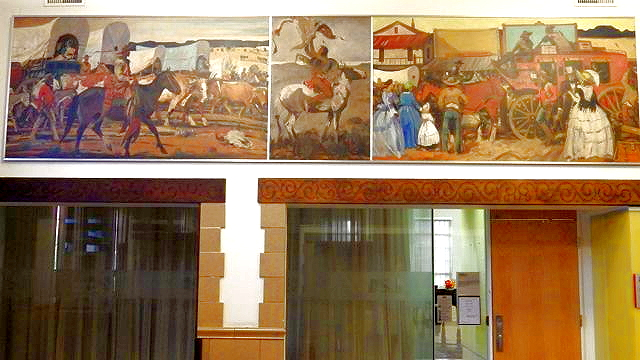
Progress of the Pioneer, the Arrival of the U.S. Mail Coach by La Verne Nelson Black

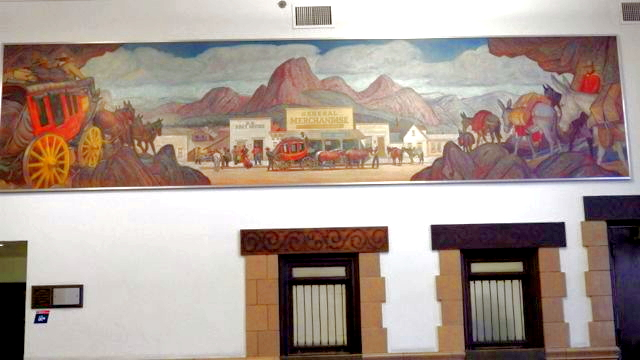
Communication During the Period of Exploration by Oscar Berninghaus

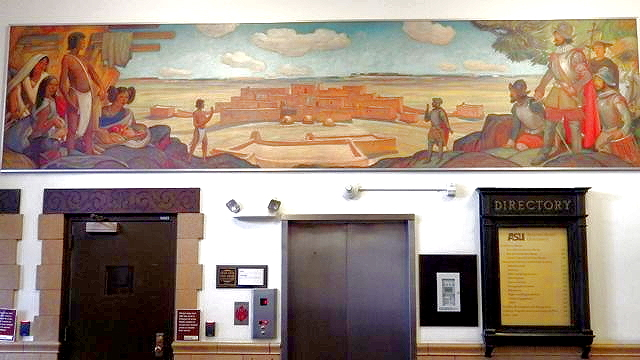
Spanish Explorers and American Indians by Oscar Berninghaus

== Architectural description ==
The Post Office is located several blocks north of the center of downtown Phoenix. It occupies a large parcel bounded on the east by North Central Avenue, on the north by West Fillmore Street, on the west by North First Avenue, and on the south by the post office driveway and receiving area. It was designed with three principal elevations. While the Fillmore street elevation is technically the front of the building, the east and west elevations are mirror images of each other and contain the public entries.

A Spanish Colonial Revival theme, influenced by the proportions and symmetry of the Italian Renaissance, was chosen for the building. In plan, the building consists of a two-story rectangular mass 193 feet wide by 165 feet deep, with a second, smaller rectangular wing, 127 feet by 60 feet, centered on the rear elevation. A tiled hip roof crowns the main wing while the rear wing is flat-roofed. A frieze containing attic vents bands the entire structure. The building has a full basement, illuminated on the principal elevations by large light wells bordered by wrought iron railings. Cement stucco sheathes the exterior above a rusticated concrete plinth which simulates granite in its appearance. Trim is primarily cast stone and concentrated around the entries on the east and west and the end bays on the north, each of which is distinguished by ornate, Classical treatments. Bays are defined solely by the fenestration.

The building has a composite type structural system which utilizes steel framing for beams and columns and poured reinforced concrete for floor slabs and fireproofing around the steel. It rests upon three-tiered spread footings of reinforced concrete, large enough to carry additional stories. Foundation walls are of poured reinforced concrete while the exterior walls above the foundation are constructed of brick masonry. Interior walls are generally hollow terra cotta tile.

In plan and in architectural character, the three floors of the building are generally quite distinct from each other. The basement is utilitarian, with an L-shaped corridor providing access to various storage, service, and mechanical areas. As the main public level, the first floor contains the most architecturally detailed space, the post office lobby which runs the width of the building. Suites of offices occupy the space north of the lobby while bays of post office boxes and the post office workroom are located to the south. Additional office space is arranged around the generally F-shaped corridor of the second story. Light courts fill in the open spaces of the "F."

Architectural integrity of the Federal Building-Post Office is generally quite high on the exterior but somewhat impaired on the interior. The most significant alterations include the replacement of the original entry doors; painting of the cast stone exterior trim; installation of wood entry vestibules and new post office box vestibules in the post office lobby; closure of several original post office service window bays; and remodeling of many of the offices.

== Arizona State University ==
The building currently is part of Arizona State University at the Downtown Phoenix campus. It houses such functions as student organizations, counseling services, administrative offices and the ASU Police Department. A USPS location is situated on the first floor of the old post office.

== See also ==
- List of United States post offices
