= Brophy College Chapel =

- U.S. National Register of Historic Places
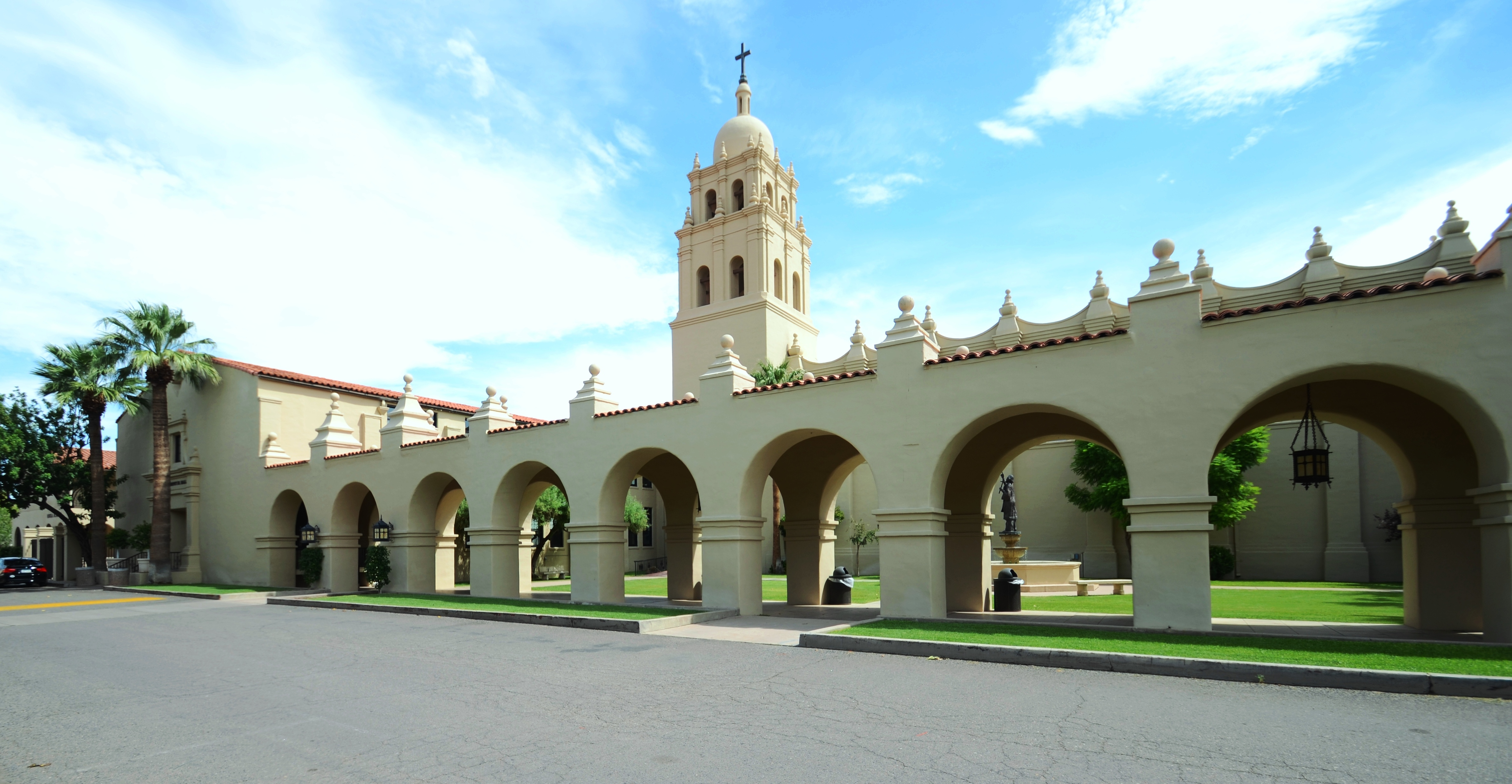

- Location within Arizona Location within the United States
- Location: 4701 N. Central Ave., Phoenix, Arizona
- Coordinates: 33°30′18″N 112°4′19″W
- Area: less than one acre
- Built: 1928
- Architect: Lescher & Mahoney; E. J. Wasielewski
- Architectural style: Mission/Spanish Revival
- MPS: Religious Architecture in Phoenix MPS
- NRHP reference No.: 93000747
- Added to NRHP: August 10, 1993

Brophy College Chapel is a chapel at Brophy College Preparatory, a Jesuit high school in Phoenix, Arizona. It was listed on the National Register of Historic Places in 1993.

== History and architecture ==
The building was constructed in 1928 along with the original school as a donation from Mrs. William Henry Brophy in memory of her late husband. The Mission/Spanish Colonial Revival building was built from brick with stucco facing, along with clay tile for the roof. The chapel is a two and a half tall square building measuring 100x100 feet. Pilasters divide the building into vertical bays. It was designed by Lescher & Mahoney, architects who designed several other NRHP-listed buildings in Phoenix.

Situated along Phoenix's Central Avenue in mid-town, the bell tower of the chapel, which is 135 feet (41 m) tall and topped with a dome and cross, is the focal point of the campus and serves as Brophy's logo.

=== Interior architecture ===
The building's altar is pink tufa, quarried near Wickenburg, designed in a Mexican baroque style. A painting of the Holy Family by an unknown Italian artist of the 15th century is framed above. Inside the sacristy, a 1670 crucifix from the Monk's Cemetery at Evaux in France is hung.

Local blacksmiths built the heavily Spanish-inspired wrought iron chandeliers. Other metalwork includes the original Communion rail, moved after Vatican Council II to a side altar.

The stained glass windows were executed in Dublin, Ireland, by the artists of An Tur Gloine. All except one in the choir loft had been ordered by 1934; a local artist was commissioned to create this remaining window in 1985.

=== Parish use ===
In 1928, St. Francis was the second parish established in Phoenix. The Brophy chapel served the parish until 1959.
