= Intimidators Stadium =

Baseball stadium in Kannapolis, North Carolina

- The Cannon
- Interactive map of Intimidators Stadium
- Former names: Fieldcrest Cannon Stadium (1995–2012); CMC-NorthEast Stadium (2012–2016)
- Location: 2888 Moose Road; Kannapolis, NC 28083
- Coordinates: 35°30′28″N 80°33′59″W
- Owner: Rowan County and City of Kannapolis
- Operator: Smith Family Baseball (maintenance by Rowan County)
- Capacity: 4,700 (seated)
- Surface: Natural Grass
- Field size: Left Field: 330 feet Left-Center: 375 feet Center Field: 400 feet Right-Center: 375 feet Right Field: 310 feet

Construction
- Groundbreaking: October 19, 1994
- Opened: April 8, 1995
- Closed: August 29, 2019
- Demolished: 2022
- Cost: $6.8 million (including adjacent property) ($14.4 million in 2025 dollars)
- Architect: Lescher and Mahoney
- Services engineers: Brittain Engineering, Inc.
- General contractors: Wayne Brothers, Inc.

Tenants
- Kannapolis Intimidators (SAL) 1995–2019; Charlotte 49ers (C-USA) 2003, 2007; Queens Royals (SAC) 2019

Intimidators Stadium was a baseball stadium in Kannapolis, North Carolina. Opened in 1995, it was the home venue for the Kannapolis Intimidators, the Class A affiliate of the Chicago White Sox.

== History ==
When the Intimidators franchise (then known as the Piedmont Phillies) began play in 1995, the stadium's construction was not complete. The field and seating areas were ready for the team's first game in April of that year, but the concession stands, restrooms, luxury boxes, and box office were not complete until that winter. The stadium was named Fieldcrest Cannon Stadium for the Fieldcrest Cannon Corporation, the textile giant that built the mill town of Kannapolis and operated it until the city was incorporated in 1984.

In addition to home games for the Intimidators, Fieldcrest Cannon Stadium was also used for several local high school baseball games each spring in addition to select Amateur Athletic Union events throughout the year.

The stadium was the home of UNC Charlotte 49ers baseball team during the 2003 season while their on-campus facility's playing surface was being redone. The 49ers played in Kannapolis again for the first part of the 2007 season while their stadium was undergoing a $6 million renovation.

The Queens Royals baseball team of Queens University of Charlotte played their 2019 season at Intimidators Stadium as they made their debut in the South Atlantic Conference (NCAA Division II) while awaiting the construction of Tuckaseegee Dream Fields in Charlotte.

A new scoreboard was installed in center field for the 2005 season, replacing the original board that the stadium used when it opened.

Atrium Health Ballpark, a new downtown ballpark, was scheduled to open for the 2020 season, replacing Intimidators Stadium, but the 2020 season was cancelled due to the COVID-19 pandemic. In September 2020, the city of Kannapolis requested bids for the redevelopment of Intimidators Stadium property. In May 2021, the city announced it would sell the stadium to a developer for $3 million with demolition planned for autumn. In May 2022, with the sale nearing completion "before the end of the month," demolition was scheduled to take place "in coming weeks". Demolition was finally underway in September 2022.

== Naming rights ==
On April 3, 2012, it was announced that Carolinas Medical Center-NorthEast purchased the naming rights to the stadium, adopting the new CMC-NorthEast Stadium name for the upcoming season. Per club policy, terms were not disclosed.

For 2016, the naming rights deal was quietly dropped, with the team referring to the stadium as Intimidators Stadium again.
