= Kannapolis Cannon Ballers =

- Founded in 1995; Kannapolis, North Carolina
Team logo
Cap insignia

Minor league affiliations
- Class: Single-A (2021–present)
- Previous classes: Class A (1995–2020)
- League: Carolina League (2021–present)
- Division: South Division
- Previous leagues: South Atlantic League (1995–2020)

Major league affiliations
- Team: Chicago White Sox (2001–present)
- Previous teams: Philadelphia Phillies (1995–2000)

Minor league titles
- League titles (1): 2005
- Division titles (2): 2017; 2024
- First-half titles (1): 2024

Team data
- Name: Kannapolis Cannon Ballers (2020–present)
- Previous names: Kannapolis Intimidators (2001–2019); Piedmont Boll Weevils (1996–2000); Piedmont Phillies (1995)
- Colors: Navy blue, red, light blue, gold, white
- Mascot: Boomer
- Ballpark: Atrium Health Ballpark (2020–present)
- Previous parks: Intimidators Stadium (1995–2019)
- Owner(s)/ Operator(s): Temerity Baseball, LLC
- General manager: Matt Millward
- Manager: Jayson Nix
- Website: milb.com/kannapolis

The Kannapolis Cannon Ballers are a Minor League Baseball team of the Carolina League and the Single-A affiliate of the Chicago White Sox. They are located in Kannapolis, North Carolina, and play their home games at Atrium Health Ballpark. The team was established in 1995 as the Piedmont Phillies. From 1996 to 2000, they were known as the Piedmont Boll Weevils. From 2001 to 2019, they were known as the Kannapolis Intimidators, after Kannapolis native NASCAR driver Dale Earnhardt, who was known as "The Intimidator," purchased a share of the team before the 2001 season.

== History ==
The Cannon Ballers franchise moved to Kannapolis in 1995 from Spartanburg, South Carolina, where it had been a Class A affiliate of the Philadelphia Phillies since the franchise's beginning in 1963.

A name-the-team contest in the fall of 1995 drew thousands of entries, and the team settled on the boll weevil as the team's new mascot, indicative of Kannapolis's history as a textile mill town (Kannapolis natives are even called "lintheads"). The Piedmont Boll Weevils kept that mascot until after the 2000 season, when NASCAR racer Dale Earnhardt purchased a share in the team's ownership. It was then that the name was changed to the Kannapolis Intimidators, in honor of Earnhardt's nickname. The team's logo was designed by Sam Bass, who has designed paint schemes and uniforms on many NASCAR, IndyCar, and NHRA race cars. It was also during that off-season that the team's parent club changed from the Phillies to the Chicago White Sox, making the Intimidators the third White Sox farm team to be located in the Carolinas, following the Charlotte Knights and the Winston-Salem Warthogs (now known as the Winston-Salem Dash).

Earnhardt, who drove the number 3 car in NASCAR, was killed in an accident at the Daytona 500 in February 2001. Following Earnhardt's death, the Intimidators avoided assigning the number 3 for team uniforms. Team manager Razor Shines, originally slated to wear the number, changed his uniform number to 43. The team officially retired number 3 on May 15, 2002, in memory of their former co-owner, similar to the Los Angeles Angels of Anaheim retiring the number 26 (the 26th man) in honor of former owner Gene Autry.

From 1995 to 2019, the team played in Intimidators Stadium (formerly Fieldcrest Cannon and later CMC-NorthEast Stadium) in Kannapolis. "The Cannon" was still under construction when the Piedmont Phillies began play in 1995. Upon completion in late 1995, during the winter, the stadium seated 4,700 fans. The stadium changed names on April 3, 2012, under a new naming rights agreement for the 2012 season. For 2016, the naming rights deal quietly ended, with the name reverting to Intimidators Stadium.

Current or former Major League Baseball players to pass through Kannapolis include Jimmy Rollins and Dave Coggin of the Philadelphia Phillies, as well as Jack Egbert, Gordon Beckham, Chris Getz, Brent Morel, and Clayton Richard of the Chicago White Sox. Marlon Byrd, Jorge Padilla, Ryan Madson, and Brett Myers played for the 2000 Piedmont Boll Weevils. Also, NFL running back Ricky Williams played for the Boll Weevils during the late 1996 and 1997 seasons while also playing college football for the University of Texas.

On October 30, 2018, ground was broken on a new ballpark in downtown Kannapolis as part of a mixed-use redevelopment plan. The stadium was scheduled to be ready for the team's 2020 season opener on April 16, 2020, but the Minor League season was canceled due to the COVID-19 pandemic. The stadium quietly opened to fans in early May as a public park, following appropriate COVID-19 protocols.

With the move, the team announced in February 2019 that it would seek ideas for a new name to be introduced at the same time. The new owners cited their inability to widely market the Intimidator name due its association with Earnhardt, and trademark rights held by his estate. On October 23, 2019, the team unveiled its new identity as the Kannapolis Cannon Ballers. Team leadership looked for a name that reflected both the city's heritage and its association with auto racing. "Cannons" was among the most popular suggestions, which was refined into "Cannon Ballers" for a broader appeal. The mascot — a baseball-headed stuntman — has a mustache reminiscent of Earnhardt's. A public vote was held to determine the mascot's name, with "Boomer" announced as the winner on January 15, 2020.

In conjunction with Major League Baseball's restructuring of Minor League Baseball in 2021, the Cannon Ballers were organized into the Low-A East at the Low-A classification. In 2022, the Low-A East became known as the Carolina League, the name historically used by the regional circuit prior to the 2021 reorganization, and was reclassified as a Single-A circuit.

== Ownership ==
Smith Family Baseball, owned by Illinois businessman Dale Smith and his son Brad (the team's President) bought the team from Dale Earnhardt, Inc. and motorsports magnate Bruton Smith in December 2004. Larry and Sue Hedrick, the owners who bought the Spartanburg Phillies in 1993 and eventually moved them to Kannapolis, retained a minority share of the team's ownership.

A group led by Reese L. Smith III announced the purchase of the Intimidators in 2015, subject to approval by the South Atlantic League, Minor League Baseball and the Commissioner of Baseball. The Kannapolis city council voted to transfer the lease of the stadium to Intimidators Baseball Club LLC.

The team was purchased following the 2018 season by Temerity Baseball, LLC, led by Andy Sandler of Temerity Capital Partners of Washington, D.C.

== Roster ==
Kannapolis Cannon Ballers roster
| Players | Coaches/Other |
|---|---|
| Pitchers: 40 Frankeli Arias; 32 Marco Barrios; 14 Andrew Berg; 38 Grant Cleavinger; 26 Luis Fonseca; 39 Kendry Garcia; 33 Alexander Martinez; 25 Fidel Montero; 31 Jordan Morales; 26 Anthony Patterson III; 15 Truman Pauley; 20 Nick Pinto; 17 Gabriel Rodriguez; 11 Ryan Schiefer; 37 Gabe Tanner; 22 Nick Weyrich; 35 Daniel Wright; 18 Fabian Ysalla; Catchers: 24 Stiven Flores; 6 Landon Hodge; 29 Steven Lancia; 7 Erasmi Rodriguez ~; Infielders: 16 Alexander Albertus; 1 Jake Berkland; 12 Matthew Boughton; 9 Billy Carlson; 23 Grayson Fitzwater; 5 Efran Teran; Outfielders: 7 Clay Burdette; 21 Jaden Fauske; 27 Christian Gonzalez; 30 Braden Holcomb; 4 Crew McChesney ~; 8 Abraham Nunez | Manager: 17 Jayson Nix; Coaches: 28 Xavier Fernández (bench); 13 Rob Hardy (pitching); 19 Charlie Romero (hitting); 60-day injured list: -- Luis Reyes; -- Casey Saucke; 7-day injured list; * On Chicago White Sox 40-man roster; ~ Development list; # Rehab assignment; ∞ Reserve list; ‡ Restricted list; § Suspended list; † Temporarily inactive list; Roster updated August 30, 2026; Transactions; → More rosters: MiLB • Carolina League; → Chicago White Sox minor league players |

== Championship series history ==
The Spartanburg/Kannapolis franchise has appeared in four SAL championship series and one Carolina League championship, winning two total:

- 1988 (Spartanburg Phillies) – defeated Charleston, 3 games to 0
- 1995 (Piedmont Phillies) – lost to Augusta, 3 games to 2
- 2005 (Kannapolis Intimidators) – defeated Hagerstown, 3 games to 1
- 2017 (Kannapolis Intimidators) – lost to Greenville, 3 games to 1
- 2024 (Kannapolis Cannon Ballers) – lost to Fredericksburg, 2 games to 1

== Notable franchise alumni ==
Baseball Hall of Fame alumni

- Scott Rolen (1994) Elected, 2023
- Ryne Sandberg (1979) Inducted, 2005

Notable alumni

- Andy Ashby (1988–1989) 2-time MLB All-Star
- Dylan Axelrod, Major League pitcher
- George Bell (1979) 3-time MLB All-Star; 1987 AL Most Valuable Player
- Jimmy Bloodworth (1954)
- Barry Bonnell (1975)
- Ricky Bottalico (1992) MLB All-Star
- Larry Bowa (1966) 5-time MLB All-Star; 2001 NL Manager of the Year
- Lloyd Brown (1926)
- Marlon Byrd (2000) MLB All-Star
- Don Carman (1979)
- Spud Chandler (1955) 4-time MLB All-Star; 1943 AL Most Valuable Player
- Joe Charboneau (1976) 1980 AL Rookie of the Year
- Rocky Colavito (1952) 9-time MLB All-Star
- Bartolo Colón (2009) 4-time MLB All-Star; 2005 AL Cy Young Award
- Mark Davis (1979) 2-time MLB All-Star; 1989 NL Cy Young Award
- Darren Daulton (1981) 3-time MLB All-Star
- Bob Dernier (1978)
- Adam Eaton (1997)
- Jim Essian (1970)
- Brad Goldberg (2013), MLB pitcher
- Gio González (2004–2005), MLB All-Star Washington Nationals starting pitcher.
- Jason Grimsley (1987)
- Kevin Gross (1981) MLB All-Star
- Willie Hernández (1974) 3-time MLB All-Star; 1984 AL Cy young Award; 1984 AL Most Valuable Player
- Chris James (1983)
- Mike LaValliere (1981)
- Mike Lieberthal (1991) 2-time MLB All-Star; Gold Glove
- Brandon McCarthy (2004)
- Chuck McElroy (1987)
- Mike Maddux (1983)
- Ryan Madson (2000)
- Jerry Martin (1972)
- Buck Martinez (1968)
- Billy Moran (1953) 2-time MLB All-Star
- Mickey Morandini (1989) MLB All-Star
- Keith Moreland (1975)
- Jim Morrison (1974)
- Brett Myers (2000)
- Dickie Noles (1976)
- Carlos Quentin (2009) 2-time MLB All-Star
- Dave Roberts (1963)
- Jimmy Rollins (1997) 3-time MLB All-Star; 2007 NL Most Valuable Player
- Sergio Santos (2009)
- Scott Service (1986)
- Carlos Silva (1999)
- Lonnie Smith (1975) MLB All-Star
- Tony Taylor (1982, MGR) 2-time MLB All-Star
- Andre Thornton (1969) 2-time MLB All-Star
- Manny Trillo (1969) 3-time MLB All-Star
- Derrick Turnbow (1999) MLB All-Star
- Tom Underwood (1973)
- Ozzie Virgil (1977) 2-time MLB All-Star
- Hal Wagner (1938) 2-time MLB All-Star
- Bob Walk (1977) MLB All-Star
- Tillie Walker (1910–1911) 1918 AL Home Run Leader
- Ricky Williams (1996–1997) NFL Pro-Bowl; 1998 Heisman Trophy
