= Orpheum Theatre (Phoenix, Arizona) =

1929 historic venue

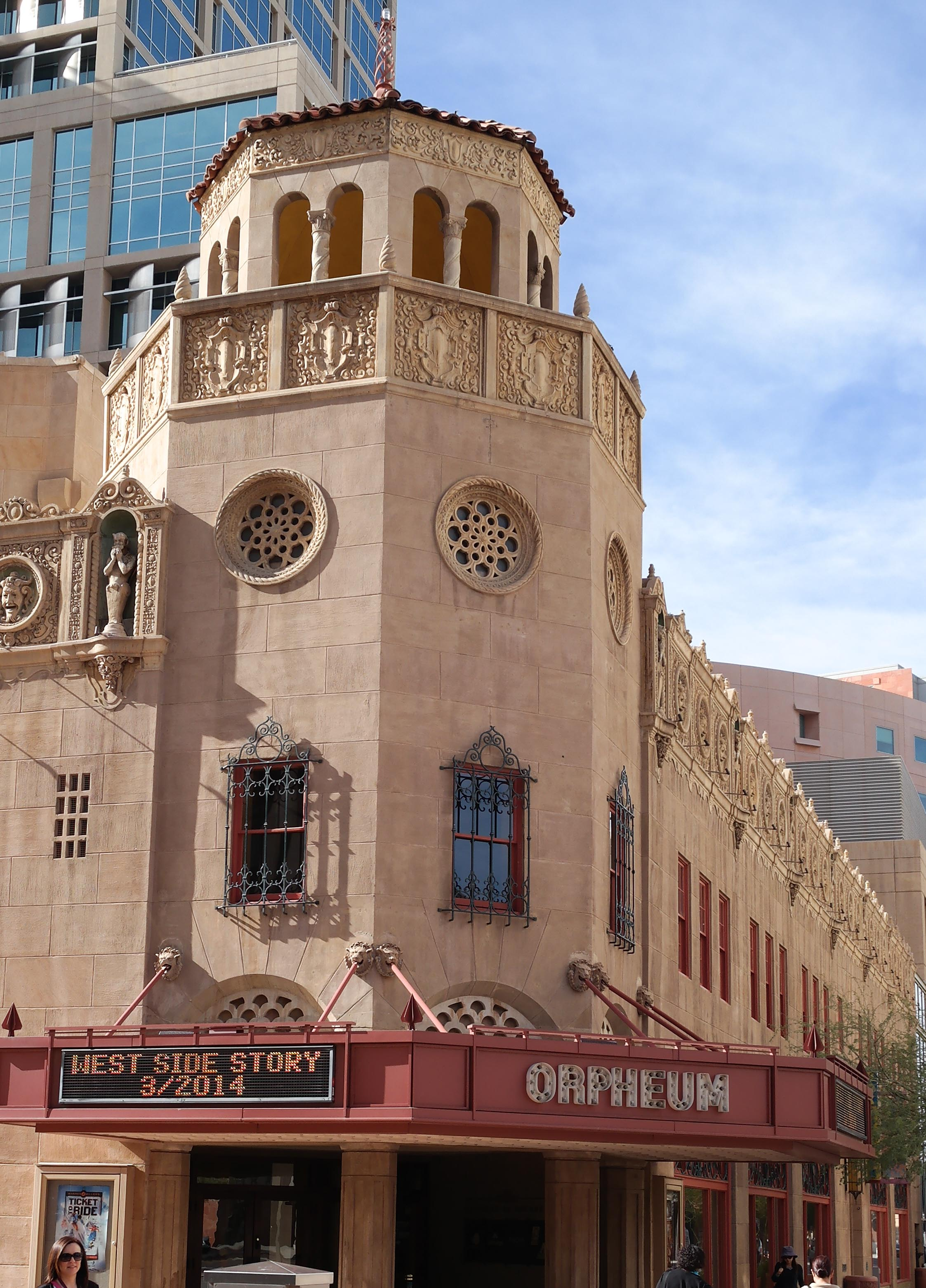
- Interactive map of Orpheum Theatre
- Former names: The Paramount, Palace West
- Address: 203 W. Adams St. Phoenix, Arizona; United States
- Owner: Phoenix Convention Center & Venues
- Operator: Phoenix Convention Center & Venues
- Capacity: 1,364
- Type: Touring Theater

Construction
- Opened: 1929
- Closed: 1984
- Reopened: 1997
- Architects: Lescher & Mahoney, Hugh Gilbert
- General contractor: McGinty Construction Company

Tenants
- American Theatre Guild; Phoenix Opera

Website
- www.orpheumphx.com
- Orpheum Theater Phoenix
- U.S. National Register of Historic Places
- Location within Arizona Location within the United States
- Coordinates: 33°26′56.73″N 112°4′33.3″W
- Architect: Lescher & Mahoney; Gilbert, Hugh
- Architectural style: Spanish Revival/Baroque Revival
- MPS: Phoenix Commercial MRA
- NRHP reference No.: 85002067
- Added to NRHP: September 4, 1985

The Orpheum Theatre is a 1364-seat theatre in downtown Phoenix. This venue was originally used for vaudeville acts as part of the nationwide Orpheum Circuit.

== History ==
Construction began in 1927 and was completed in 1929 for a total cost of $750,000. It was designed by architects Lescher & Mahoney, with Hugh Gilbert associated. It was built for owner-operators J.E. Rickards and Harry Nace by the McGinty Construction Company. Built in a Spanish Revival style of Spanish Baroque architecture style, intricate murals and moldings were an integral part of the design, all meant to give patrons the impression that they were enjoying the shows "al fresco".

In the 1940s the Orpheum was purchased by the Paramount Pictures chain, and renamed, "The Paramount". In the 1960s Nederlander purchased it to add it as a stop on the Broadway circuit. Throughout the 1960s until its restoration, it was renamed, "Palace West".

Throughout the mid 1970s and early 1980s, the Theatre was leased to the local Mexican enterprising Corona family, who presented a wide variety of Hispanic events and movies. At one point all the murals and moldings were painted black when the Orpheum was used to show Spanish films. In addition to wanting to hide the areas that were already in poor condition, it was thought that such decorations would detract from the films.

Restoration

After falling into disrepair for some years, the city of Phoenix purchased the Orpheum Theatre in 1984 and began a 12-year, $14 million restoration. The Conrad Schmitt Studios created the transformation and the Orpheum reopened on January 28, 1997, with a performance of Hello, Dolly! starring Carol Channing. After the performance, Ms. Channing, still in costume but out of character, thanked the audience for "not turning this beautiful theatre into a parking lot!"

== Present day ==
The Orpheum Theatre of Phoenix was placed on the National Register of Historic Places in 1985.

In 1997, the Orpheum became home of the newly-formed Phoenix Opera.

In addition to the Phoenix Opera, the Orpheum presents concerts, Broadway musicals, performances of Ballet Arizona and special events.

In 2019, Arizona rock band The Maine released a live album that was recorded at the Orpheum Theatre.

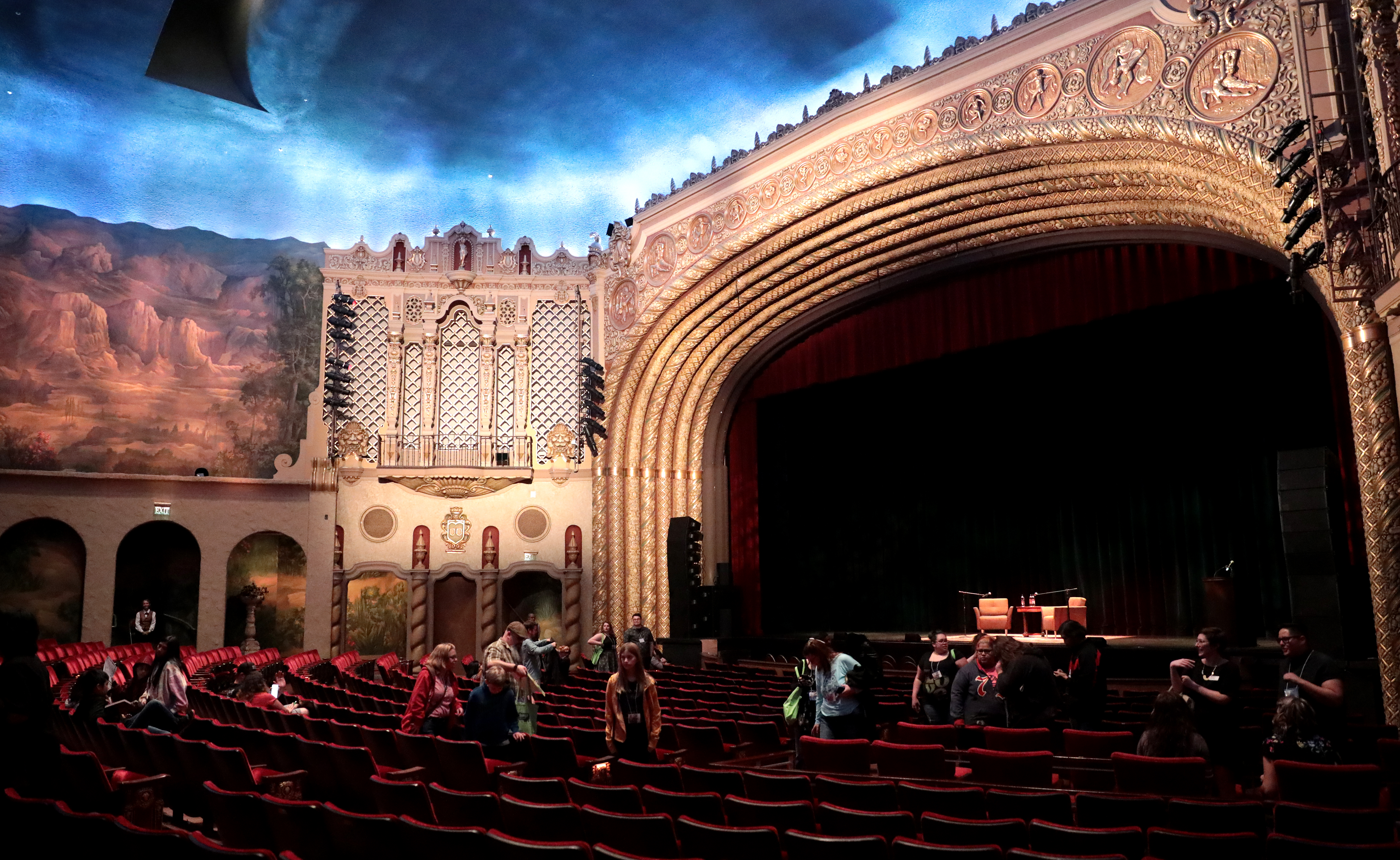
Interior

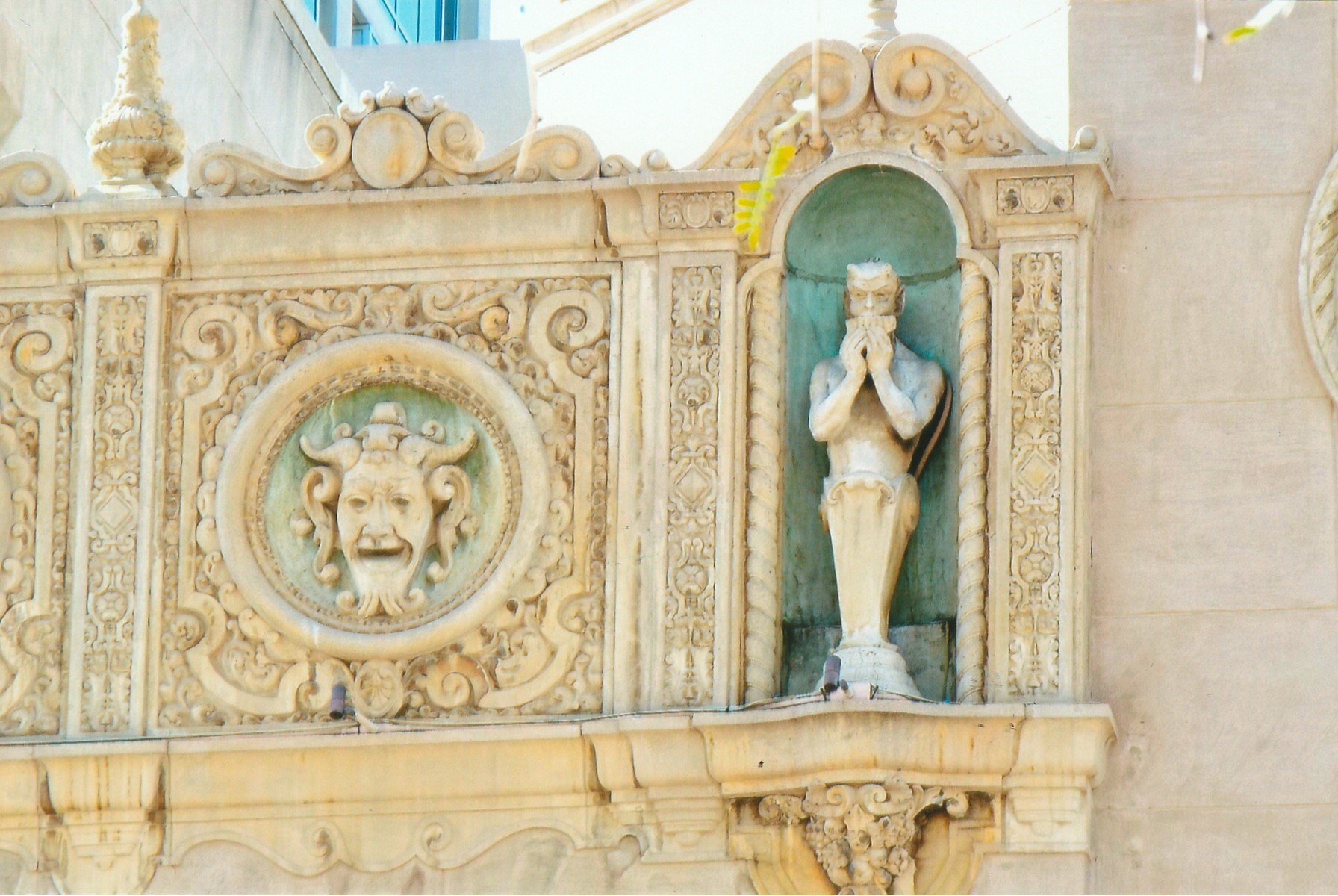
Orpheum Theatre ornament.

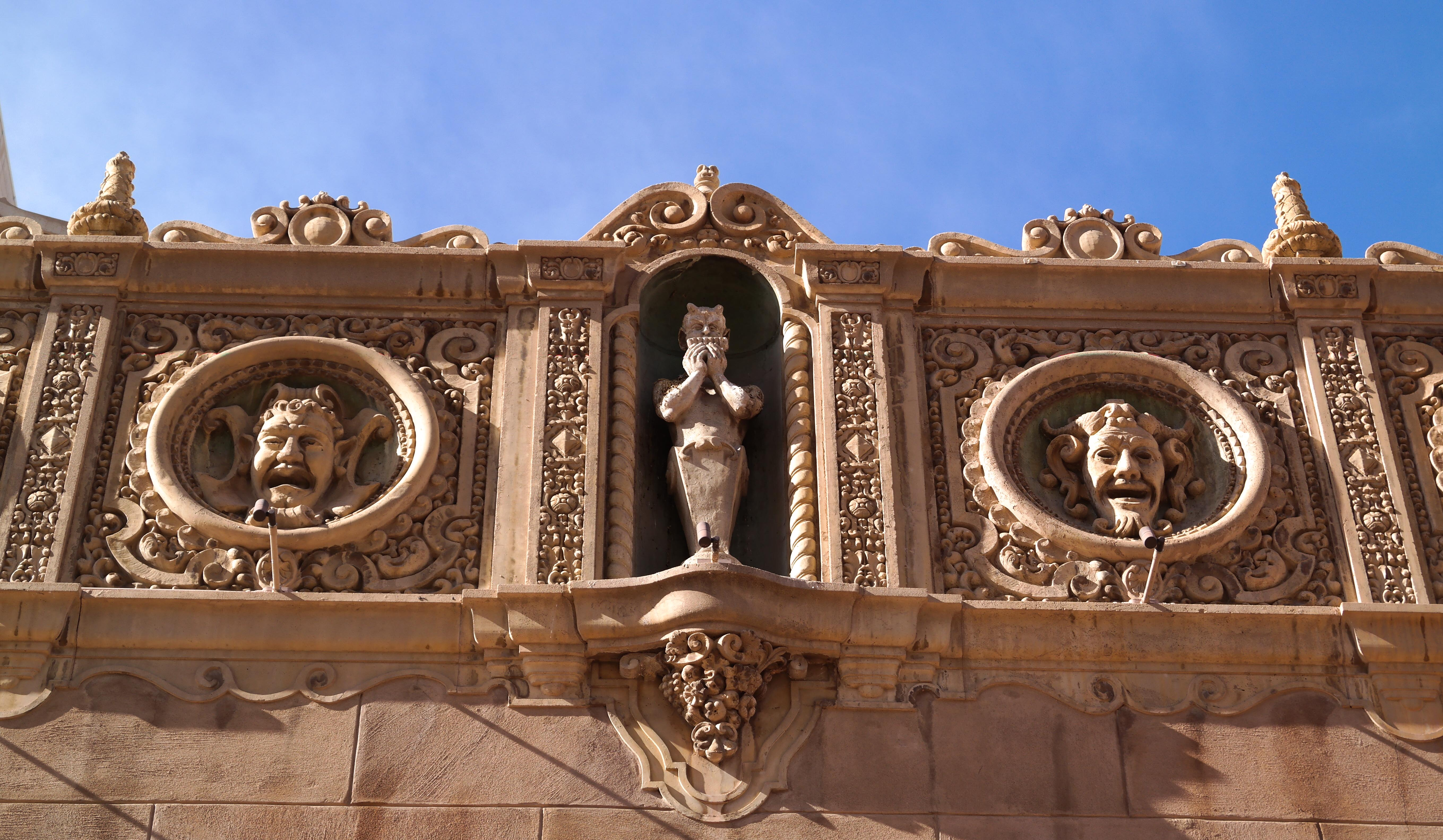
Detail of exterior frieze

== See also ==
- List of historic properties in Phoenix, Arizona
- Plitt Theatres
