= Washington metropolitan area =

Metropolitan area in the United States

Coordinates: 38°53′24″N 77°02′48″W

Washington metropolitan area National Capital Region
- Metropolitan area
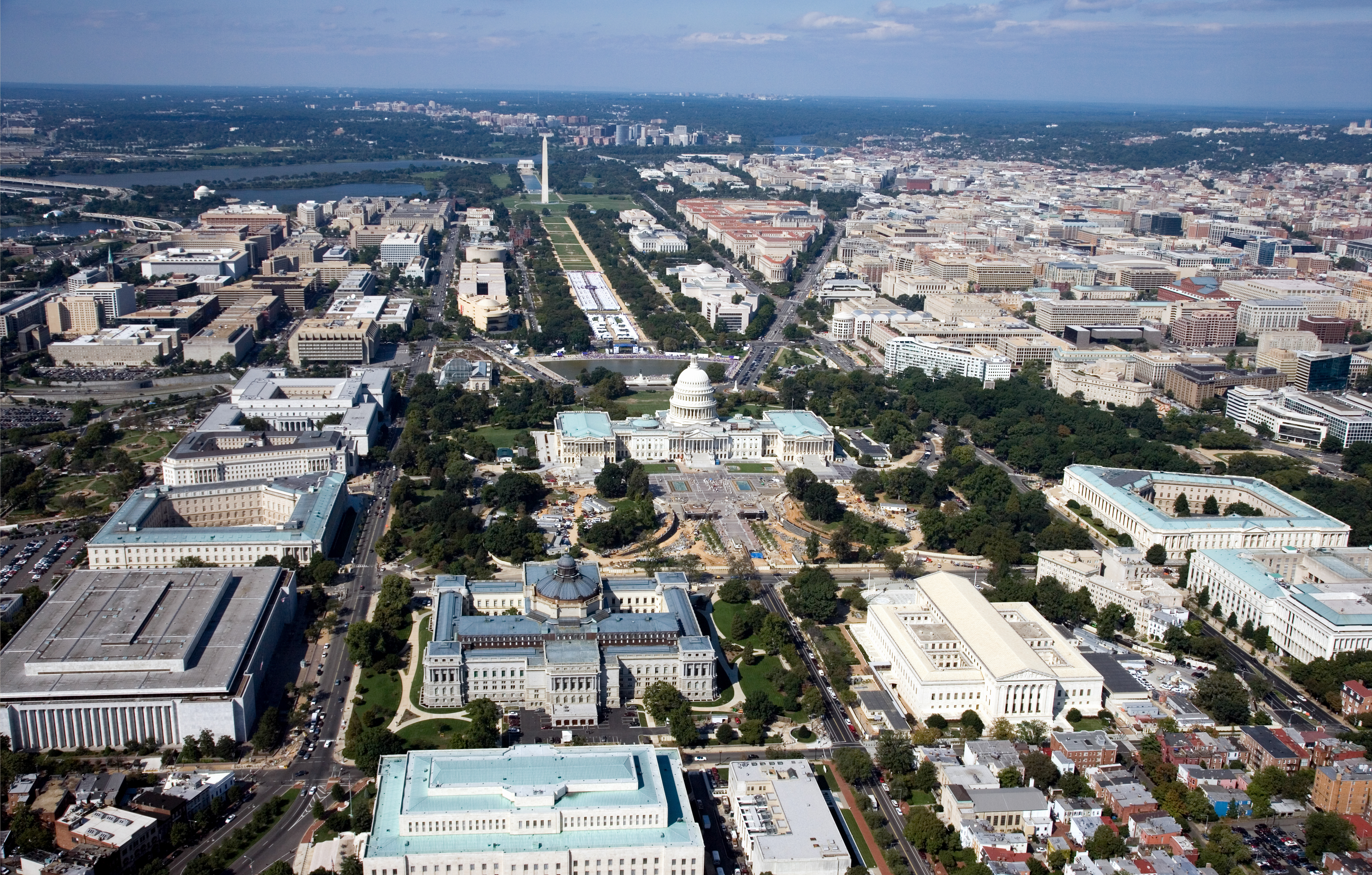
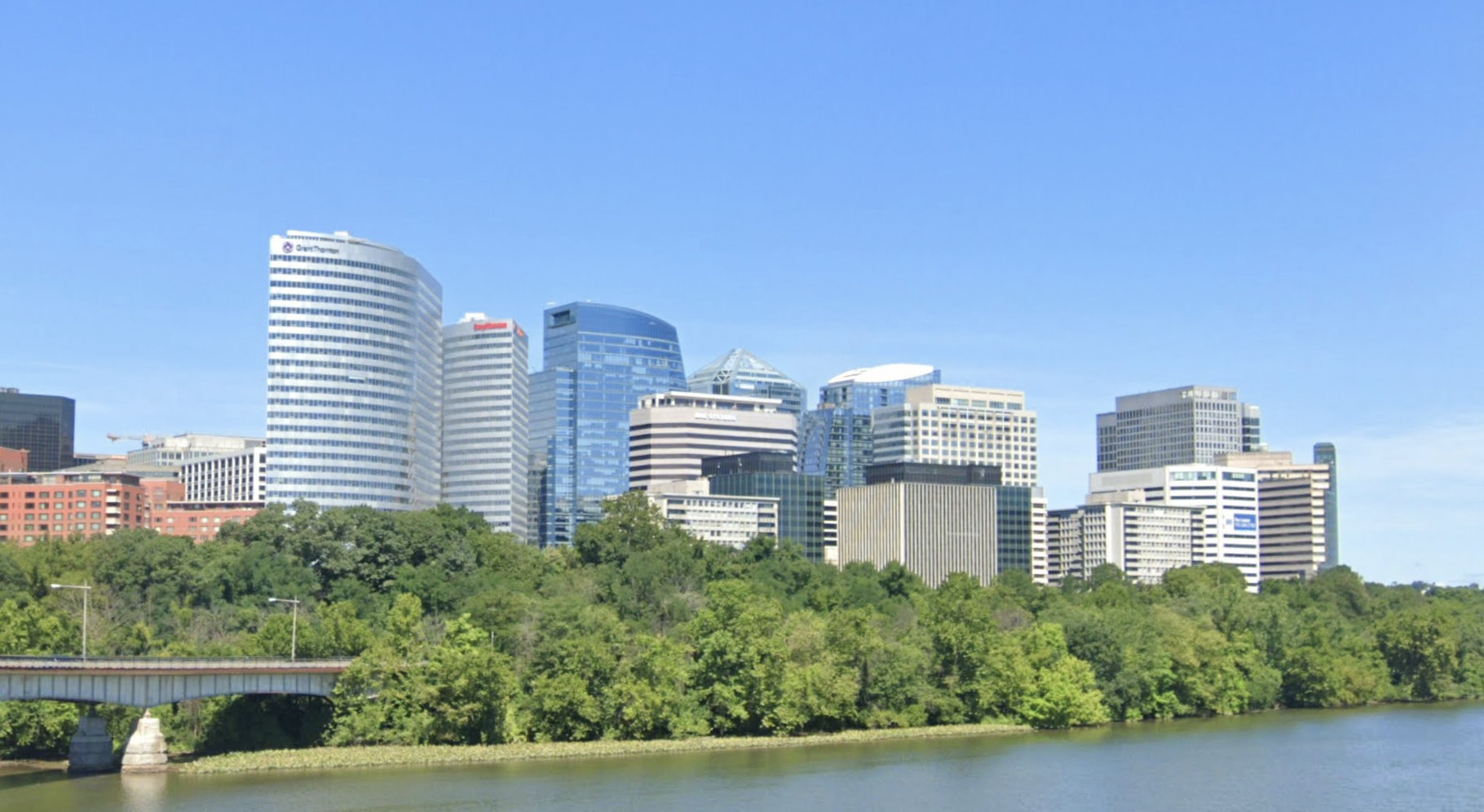
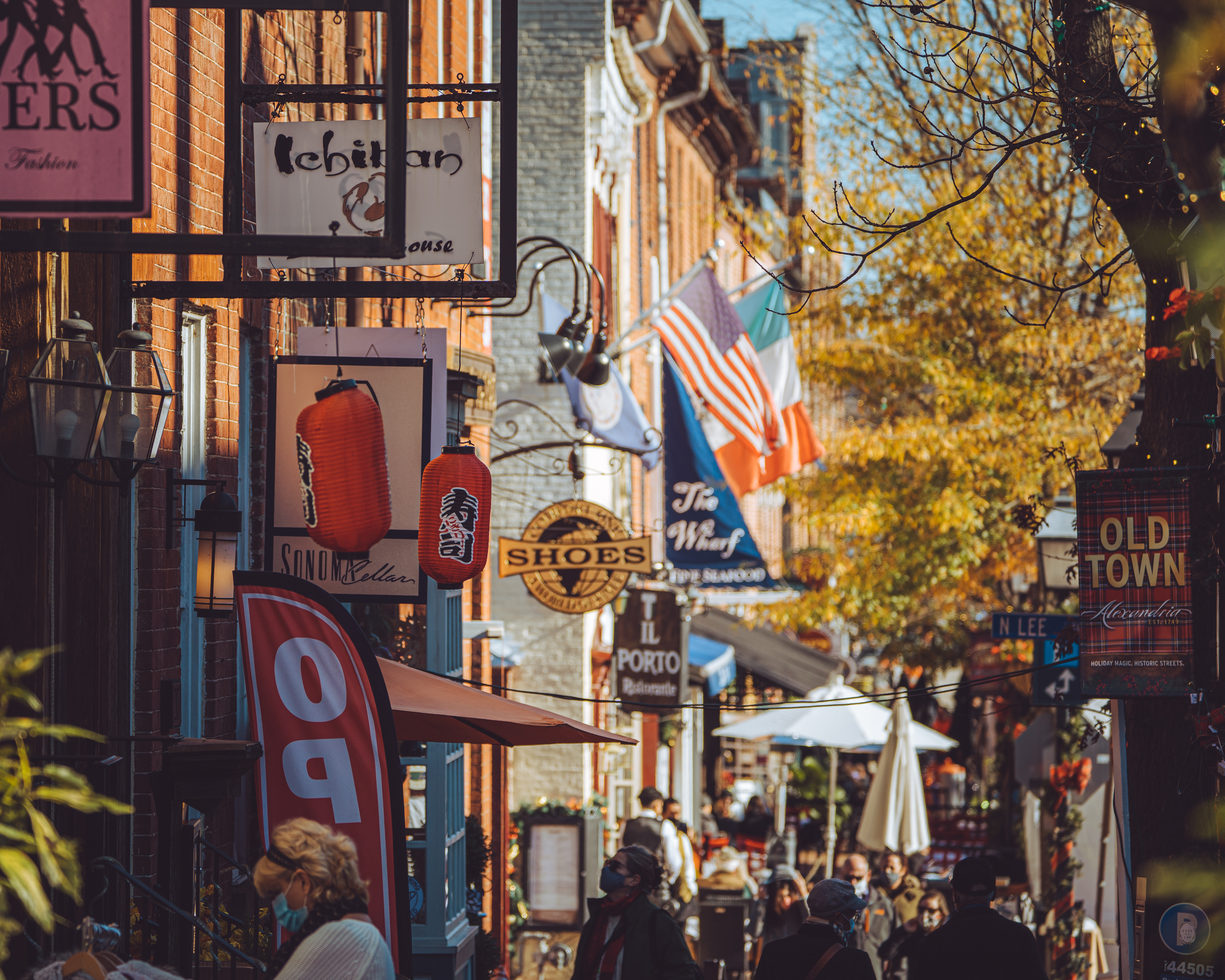
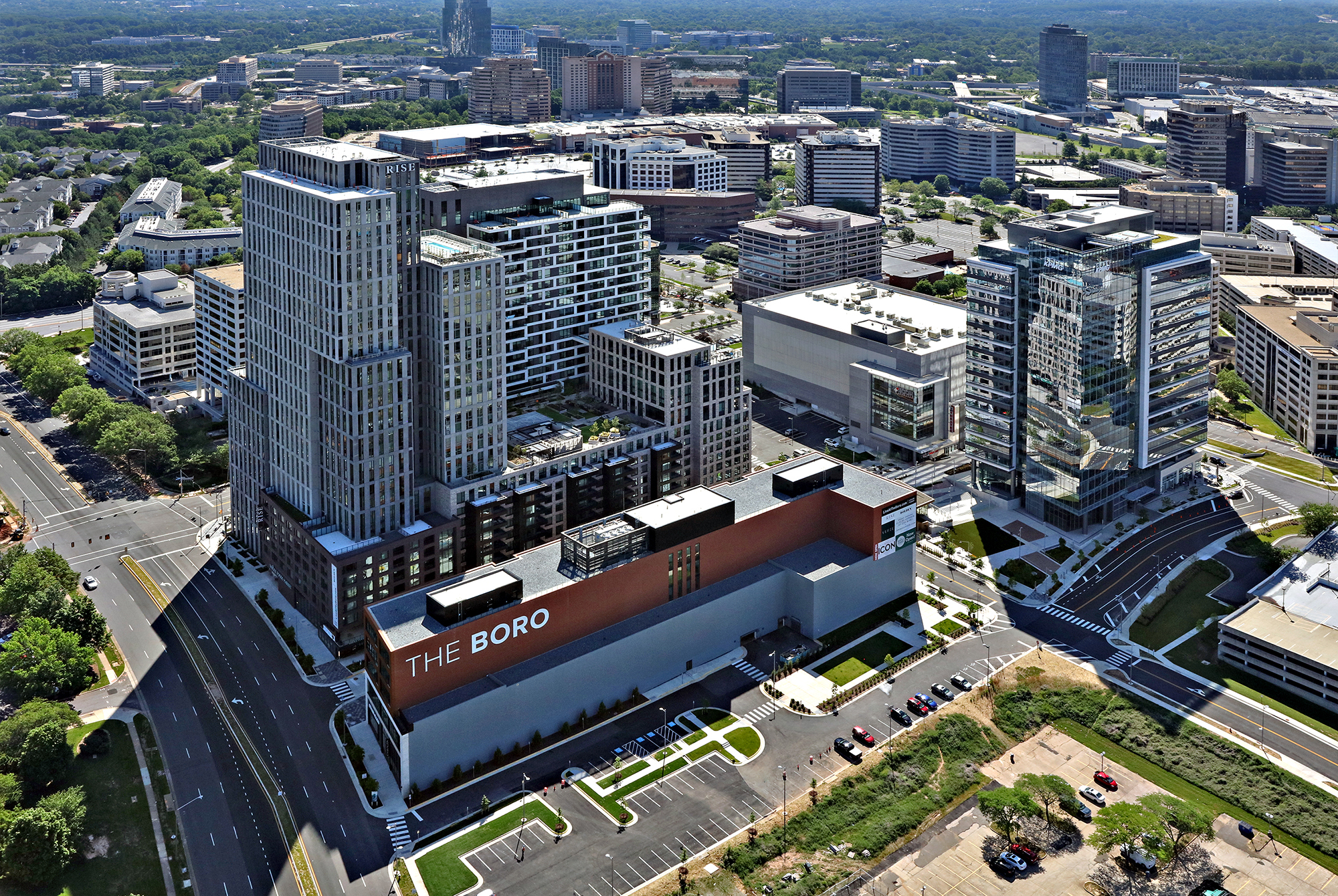
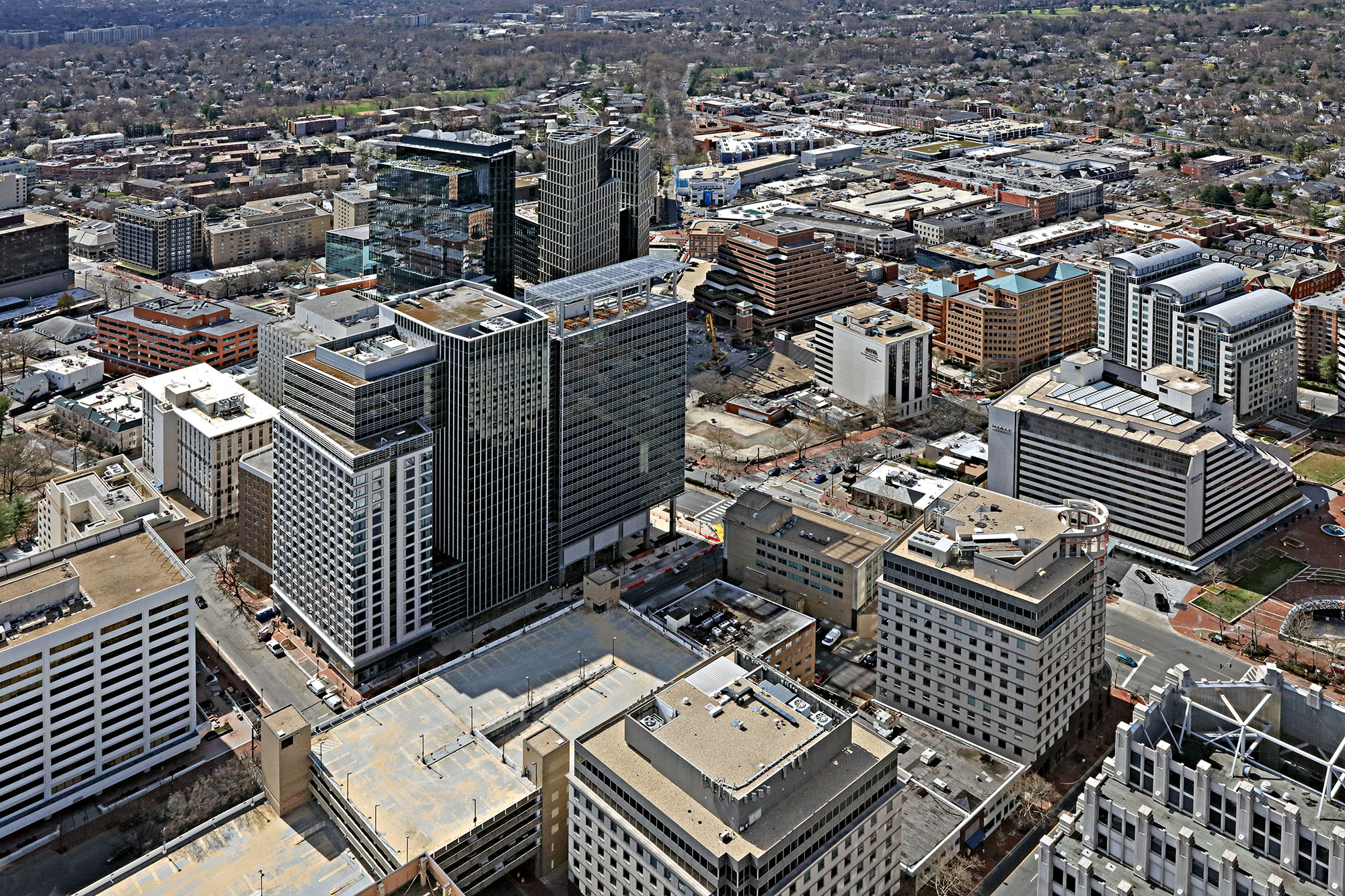
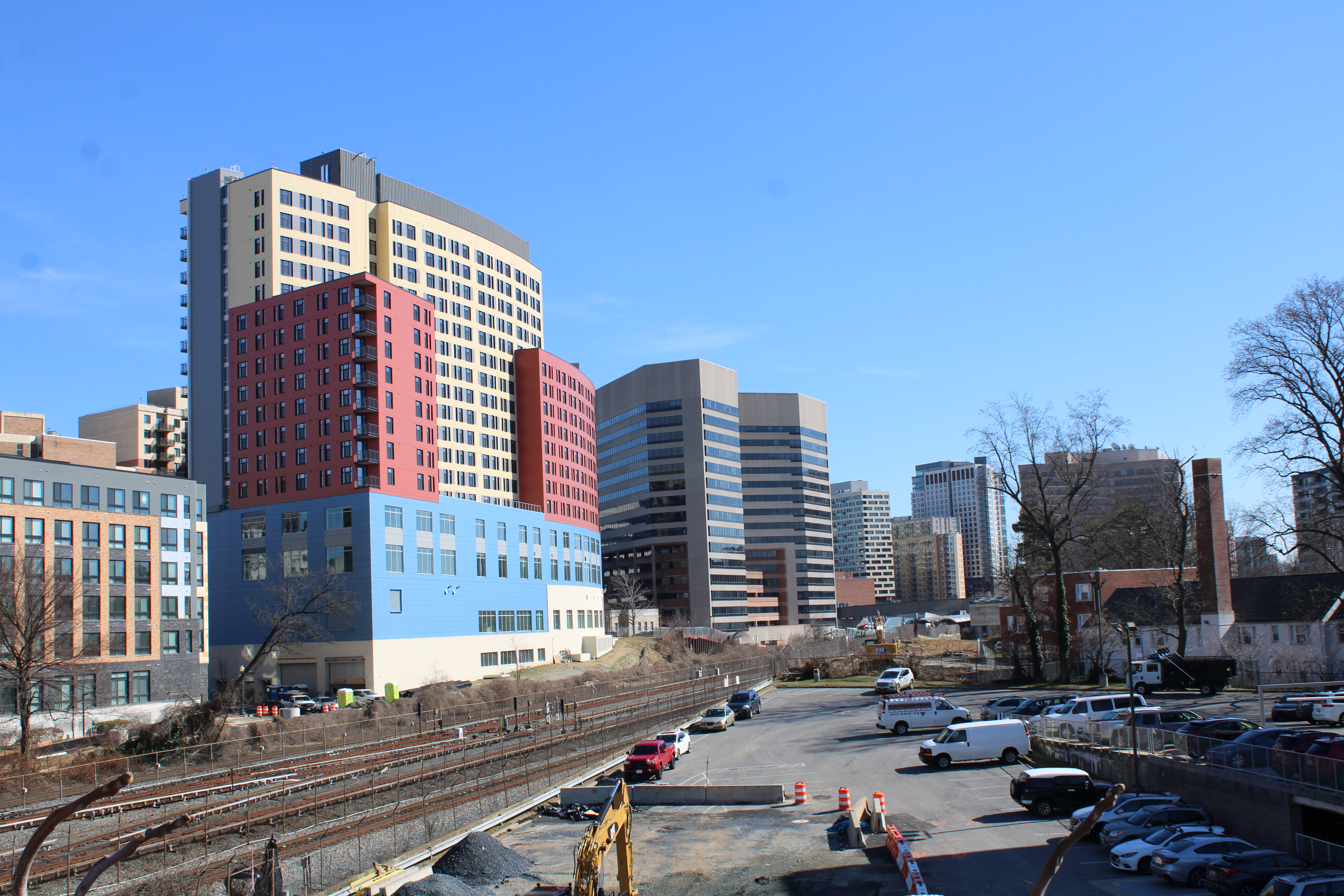
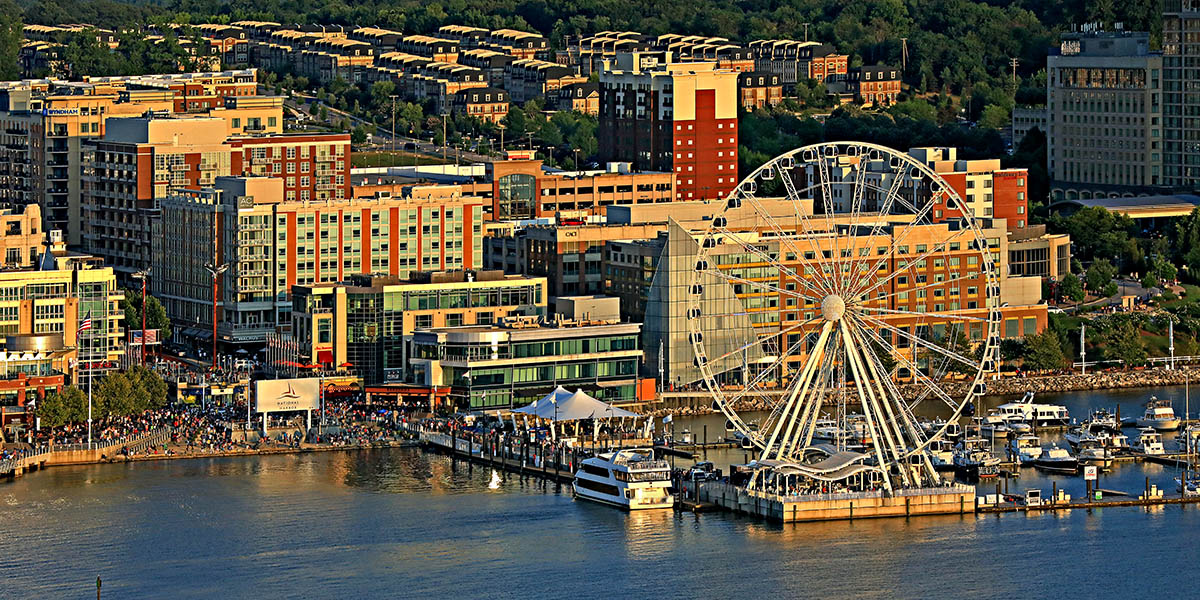
- Washington, D.C. Arlington, Virginia Alexandria, Virginia Tysons, Virginia Bethesda, Maryland Silver Spring, Maryland National Harbor, Maryland
- Nicknames: Greater Washington; DMV (DC, Maryland, Virginia)
Interactive Map of Washington–Arlington–Alexandria,
DC–VA–MD–WV MSA
Washington, D.C.
Washington–Arlington–Alexandria MSA
Washington, DC–MD Metropolitan Division
Arlington–Alexandria–Reston, VA–WV
Frederick–Gaithersburg–Bethesda, MD
Other Areas in the Washington–Baltimore CSA
- Country: United States
- States: District of Columbia; Virginia; Maryland; West Virginia
- Principal municipalities: Washington, D.C. Arlington, VA; Alexandria, VA; Reston, VA; McLean, VA; Frederick, MD; Gaithersburg, MD; Bethesda, MD; Rockville, MD; North Bethesda, MD

Area (2010)
  - Urban: 1,407.0 sq mi (3,644.2 km^{2})
  - Metro: 5,565 sq mi (14,412 km^{2})
- Elevation: 0–2,349 ft (0–716 m)

Population (2020)
  - Metropolitan area: 6,385,162 (6th)
  - Density: 972/sq mi (375.4/km^{2})
  - Urban: 5,174,759 (8th)
  - CSA (2016): 9,546,579 (4th)
- Urban pop as of 2016

GDP
  - Metropolitan area: $714.685 billion (2024)
- Time zone: UTC−5 (EST)
  - Summer (DST): UTC−4 (EDT)

The Washington metropolitan area (also referred to as the National Capital Region, Greater Washington, or locally as the DMV, short for District of Columbia, Maryland, and Virginia) is the metropolitan area comprising Washington, D.C., the federal capital of the United States, and its surroundings. The metropolitan area includes all of Washington, D.C., and parts of Maryland, Virginia and West Virginia. The United States federal government defines the area as the Washington–DC, VA–MD–WV metropolitan statistical area. It anchors the southern end of the densely populated Northeast megalopolis and is part of the Washington–Baltimore combined statistical area, the country's third-largest. The area's estimated total population of 6,304,975 (as of 2023) makes it the country's seventh-most populous metropolitan area. It is one of the country's most educated and affluent metropolitan areas.

== Nomenclature ==
The U.S. Office of Management and Budget defines the area as the Washington–Arlington–Alexandria, DC–VA–MD–WV metropolitan statistical area, a metropolitan statistical area used for statistical purposes by the United States Census Bureau and other agencies. The region's three largest cities are the federal city of Washington, D.C., the county (and census-designated place) of Arlington, and the independent city of Alexandria. The Office of Management and Budget also includes the metropolitan statistical area as part of the larger Baltimore–Washington metropolitan area, which has a population of 9,546,579 as of the 2014 Census Estimate.

The Washington, D.C., Maryland, and Virginia portions of the metropolitan area are sometimes referred to as the National Capital Region, particularly by federal agencies such as the military, Department of Homeland Security, and some local government agencies. The National Capital Region portion of the Washington metropolitan area is also colloquially known by the abbreviation "DMV", which stands for the "District of Columbia, Maryland, and Virginia". Interstate 495, the Capital Beltway, is at the center of the region. This is the source of the term Inside the Beltway, referring to Federal government insiders and related interests. Washington, D.C. is colloquially referred to as simply "the District" due to its status as a federal district. The Virginian portion of the region is known as Northern Virginia. The Maryland portion of the region is sometimes called the Maryland-National Capital Region by local authorities but rarely by the general public.

Composition

Satellite photo of the Washington metropolitan area

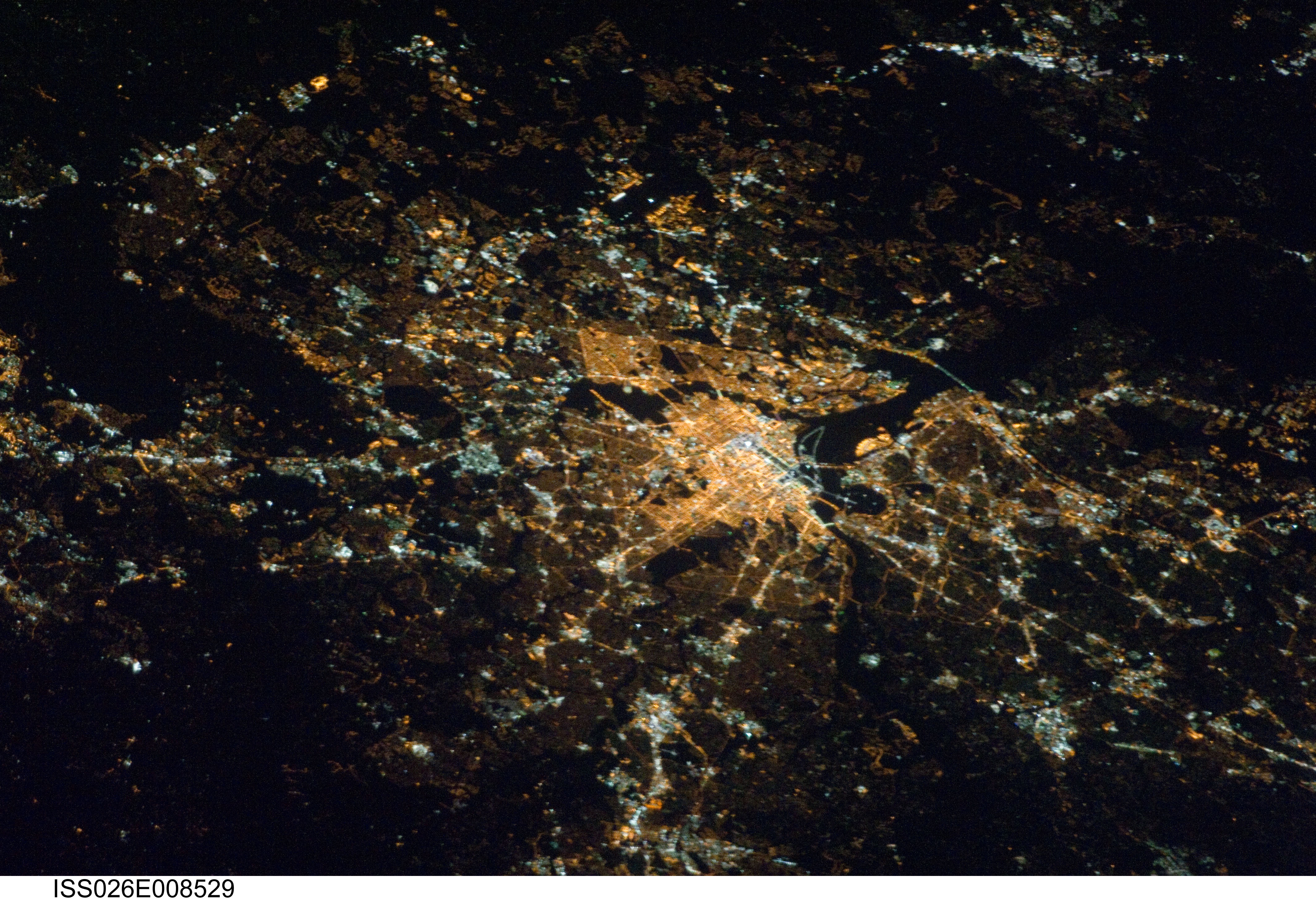
Washington area viewed at night from the International Space Station

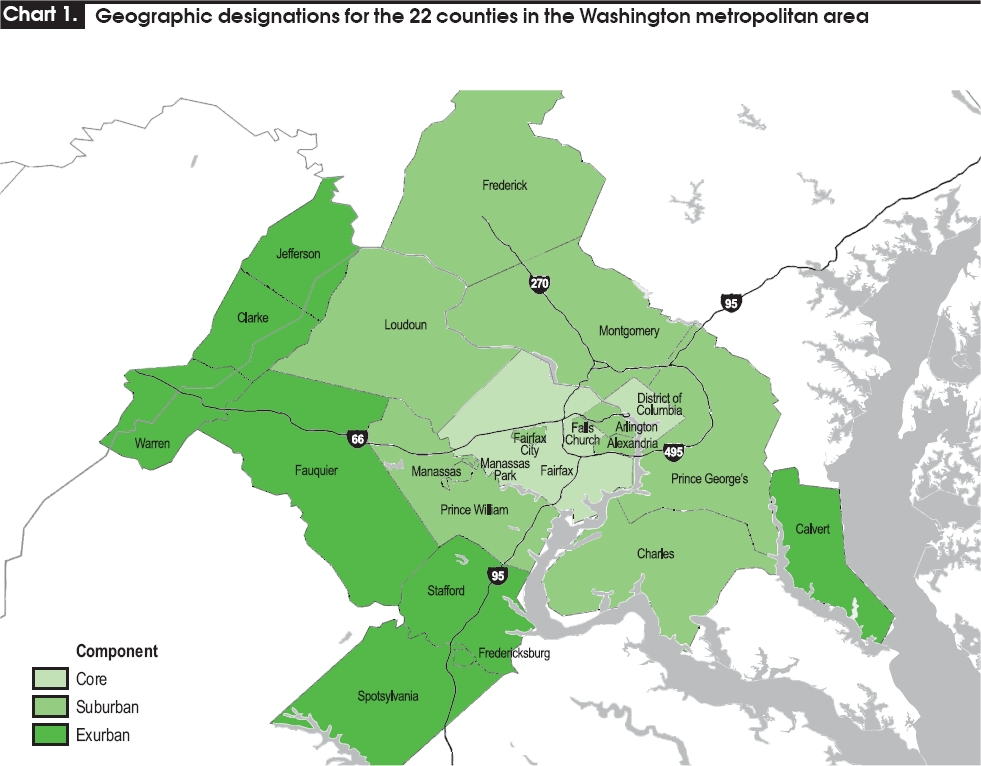
Map highlighting labor patterns of regional counties

The U.S. Census Bureau divides the Washington metropolitan statistical area into three (formerly two) metropolitan divisions:

- Washington, DC–MD Metropolitan Division, consisting of Washington D.C., Prince George's County and Charles County, Maryland
- Arlington–Alexandria–Reston, VA–WV Metropolitan Division, consisting of Northern Virginia and Jefferson County, WV
- Frederick–Gaithersburg–Rockville, MD Metropolitan Division, consisting of Montgomery and Frederick counties

== Counties or county equivalents and populations ==
Historical populations – Washington metropolitan area
Census	Pop.	Note	%±
1950	1,464,089		—
1960	2,001,897		36.7%
1970	2,861,123		42.9%
1980	3,060,922		7.0%
1990	3,923,574		28.2%
2000	4,923,153		25.5%
2010	5,636,232		14.5%
2020	6,385,162		13.3%
2022 (est.)	6,373,756		−0.2%
U.S. Decennial Census

Counties and County equivalents within the Washington metropolitan area
County	2025 estimate	2020 Census	Change	Area	Density
Fairfax County, Virginia	1,167,873	1,150,309	+1.53%	391.02 sq mi (1,012.7 km^{2})	2,987/sq mi (1,153/km^{2})
Montgomery County, Maryland	1,074,582	1,062,061	+1.18%	493.14 sq mi (1,277.2 km^{2})	2,179/sq mi (841/km^{2})
Prince George's County, Maryland	970,374	967,201	+0.33%	482.60 sq mi (1,249.9 km^{2})	2,011/sq mi (776/km^{2})
Washington, District of Columbia	693,645	689,545	+0.59%	61.13 sq mi (158.3 km^{2})	11,347/sq mi (4,381/km^{2})
Prince William County, Virginia	502,966	482,204	+4.31%	335.26 sq mi (868.3 km^{2})	1,500/sq mi (579/km^{2})
Loudoun County, Virginia	449,749	420,959	+6.84%	515.75 sq mi (1,335.8 km^{2})	872/sq mi (337/km^{2})
Frederick County, Maryland	302,883	271,717	+11.47%	660.62 sq mi (1,711.0 km^{2})	458/sq mi (177/km^{2})
Arlington County, Virginia	243,931	238,643	+2.22%	26.00 sq mi (67.3 km^{2})	9,382/sq mi (3,622/km^{2})
Charles County, Maryland	176,593	166,617	+5.99%	457.82 sq mi (1,185.7 km^{2})	386/sq mi (149/km^{2})
Stafford County, Virginia	170,803	156,927	+8.84%	268.49 sq mi (695.4 km^{2})	636/sq mi (246/km^{2})
City of Alexandria, Virginia	160,662	159,467	+0.75%	14.94 sq mi (38.7 km^{2})	10,754/sq mi (4,152/km^{2})
Spotsylvania County, Virginia	155,388	140,032	+10.97%	401.94 sq mi (1,041.0 km^{2})	387/sq mi (149/km^{2})
Fauquier County, Virginia	76,503	72,972	+4.84%	647.99 sq mi (1,678.3 km^{2})	118/sq mi (46/km^{2})
Jefferson County, West Virginia	63,102	57,701	+9.36%	209.29 sq mi (542.1 km^{2})	302/sq mi (116/km^{2})
Culpeper County, Virginia	57,666	52,552	+9.73%	379.17 sq mi (982.0 km^{2})	152/sq mi (59/km^{2})
City of Manassas, Virginia	44,332	42,772	+3.65%	9.84 sq mi (25.5 km^{2})	4,505/sq mi (1,740/km^{2})
Warren County, Virginia	42,740	40,727	+4.94%	214.57 sq mi (555.7 km^{2})	199/sq mi (77/km^{2})
City of Fredericksburg, Virginia	30,393	27,982	+8.62%	10.45 sq mi (27.1 km^{2})	2,908/sq mi (1,123/km^{2})
City of Fairfax, Virginia	26,772	24,146	+10.88%	6.24 sq mi (16.2 km^{2})	4,290/sq mi (1,657/km^{2})
City of Manassas Park, Virginia	16,560	17,219	−3.83%	3.03 sq mi (7.8 km^{2})	5,465/sq mi (2,110/km^{2})
Clarke County, Virginia	15,609	14,783	+5.59%	175.96 sq mi (455.7 km^{2})	89/sq mi (34/km^{2})
City of Falls Church, Virginia	15,159	14,658	+3.42%	2.05 sq mi (5.3 km^{2})	7,395/sq mi (2,855/km^{2})
Rappahannock County, Virginia	7,439	7,348	+1.24%	266.37 sq mi (689.9 km^{2})	28/sq mi (11/km^{2})
Total	6,465,724	6,278,542	+2.98%	6,033.67 sq mi (15,627.1 km^{2})	1,072/sq mi (414/km^{2})

=== Summary by state ===
Summary by state/district – Washington metropolitan area
State/district	Population (2020)	% of total	Area in sq mi	% of total	Density
Washington, D.C.	689,545	11%	61	1%	11,295
Maryland	2,560,379	40%	2,305	35%	1,111
Virginia	3,077,537	48%	3,987	61%	772
West Virginia	57,701	1%	210	3%	275

== Regional organizations ==
=== Metropolitan Washington Council of Governments ===
Founded in 1957, the Metropolitan Washington Council of Governments (MWCOG) is a regional organization of 21 Washington-area local governments, as well as area members of the Maryland and Virginia state legislatures, the U.S. Senate, and the U.S. House of Representatives. MWCOG provides a forum for discussion and the development of regional responses to issues regarding the environment, transportation, public safety, homeland security, affordable housing, community planning, and economic development.

The National Capital Region Transportation Planning Board, a component of MWCOG, is the federally designated metropolitan planning organization for the metropolitan Washington area.

=== Consortium of Universities in the Washington Metropolitan Area ===
Chartered in 1964, the Consortium of Universities of the Washington Metropolitan Area is a regional organization of 20 colleges and universities in the greater Washington, D.C. metropolitan area, the Smithsonian Institution, the U.S. Department of Defense (DoD), the Office of the Director of National Intelligence (ODNI), the U.S. Department of Health and Human Services (HHS), the United States Institute of Peace, and the John F. Kennedy Center for the Performing Arts representing nearly 300,000+ students. The consortium facilitates course cross registration between all member universities, and universalizes library access across some of its member universities through the Washington Research Library Consortium. It additionally offers joint procurement programs, joint academic initiatives, and campus public safety training.

=== Washington Metropolitan Area Transit Authority ===
Formed in 1967 as an interstate compact between Maryland, Virginia, and the District of Columbia, the WMATA is a tri-jurisdictional government agency with a board composed of representatives from Maryland, Virginia, the District of Columbia, and the United States Federal government that operates transit services in the Washington Metropolitan Area.

=== Metropolitan Washington Airports Authority ===
The Metropolitan Washington Airports Authority (MWAA) is a multi-jurisdictional independent airport authority, created with the consent of the United States Congress and the legislature of Virginia to oversee management, operations, and capital development of Ronald Reagan Washington National Airport and Dulles International Airport.

=== Greater Washington Board of Trade ===
Founded in 1889, the Greater Washington Board of Trade is a network of regional businesses that work to advance the culture, economy, and resiliency of the Washington metropolitan area.

=== Cultural Alliance of Greater Washington ===
The Cultural Alliance of Greater Washington (CAGW) works to increase appreciation, support, and resources for arts and culture in the Washington metropolitan area.

== Principal cities ==
Downtown Washington, D.C.

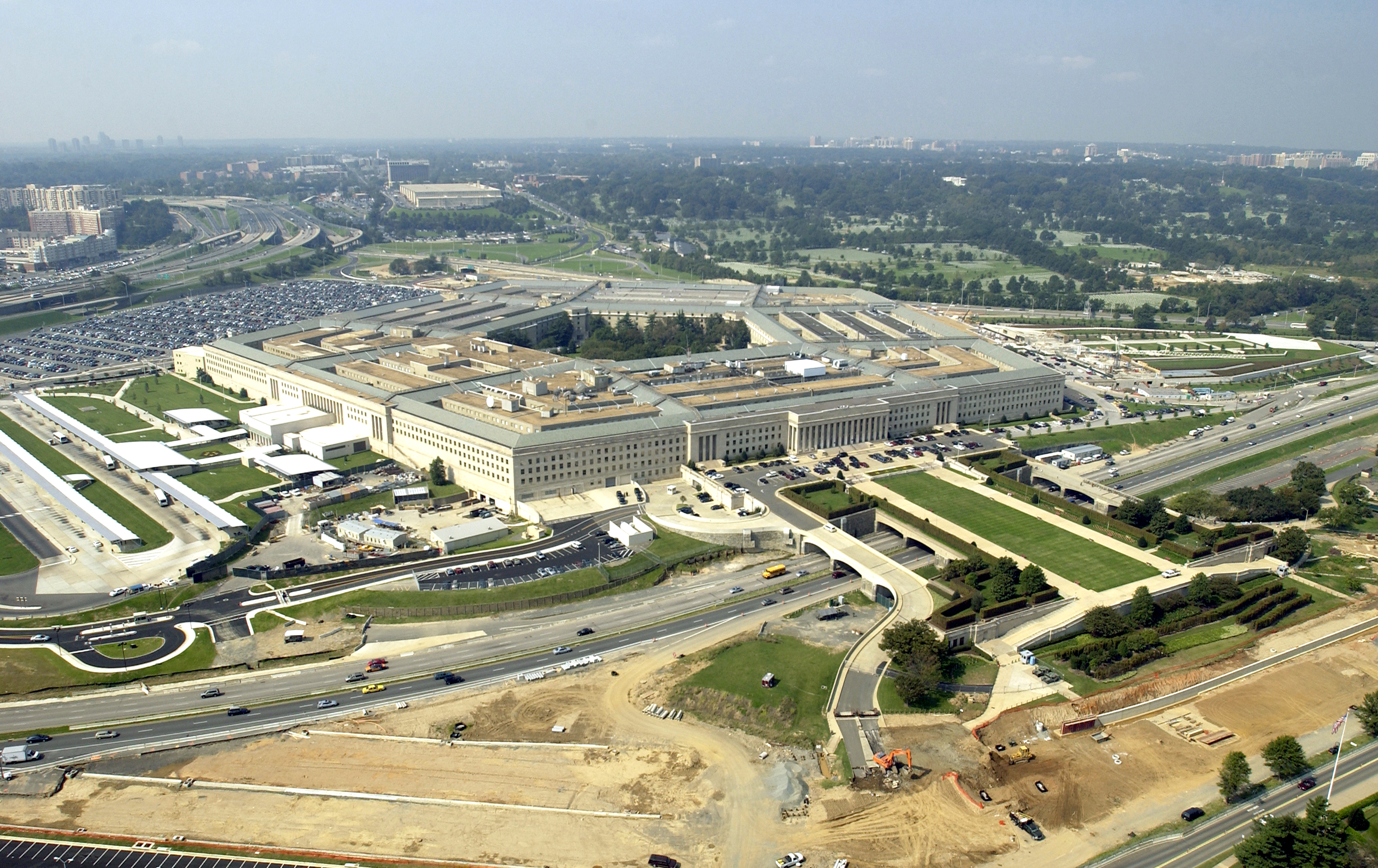
View of Arlington with the skylines of Bailey's Crossroads, Ballston, and Courthouse in the background

The metropolitan area is defined as including the following principal cities (not all of which are incorporated as cities; one, Arlington, is actually a county, while Bethesda, Reston, McLean, and North Bethesda are unincorporated census-designated places).

- Washington, D.C.
- Arlington, Virginia
- Alexandria, Virginia
- Frederick, Maryland
- Gaithersburg, Maryland
- Bethesda, Maryland
- Rockville, Maryland
- Reston, Virginia
- McLean, Virginia
- North Bethesda, Maryland

== Politics ==
The Washington metropolitan area is considered a Democratic stronghold. The last Republican to win it was Richard Nixon in his 1972 landslide reelection. Since Bill Clinton was elected in 1992, Democratic candidates have easily won the area by double-digits.

As of 2026, Democrats hold the mayoralty of D.C., the Maryland governorship, and the Virginia governorship.

Presidential election results
Year	DEM	GOP	Others
2024	68.4% 2,176,825	28.4% 901,886	3.2% 101,645
2020	72.3% 2,320,658	25.5% 818,418	2.2% 70,283
2016	69.0% 1,860,678	25.7% 692,743	5.4% 145,269
2012	67.5% 1,813,963	30.9% 829,567	1.7% 44,708
2008	68.0% 1,603,902	31.0% 728,916	1.0% 25,288
2004	61.0% 1,258,743	38.0% 785,144	1.4% 19,735
2000	58.5% 1,023,089	37.9% 663,590	3.6% 62,437
1996	57.0% 861,881	37.0% 558,830	6.0% 89,259
1992	53.0% 859,889	34.1% 553.369	12.9% 209,651
1988	50.4% 684,453	48.6% 659,344	1.0% 14,219
1984	51.0% 653,568	48.5% 621,377	0.4% 5,656
1980	44.7% 484,590	44.6% 482,506	11.1% 115,797
1976	54.2% 590,481	44.9% 488,995	1.0% 10,654
1972	44.2% 431,257	54.8% 534,235	1.1% 10,825
1968	49.4% 414,345	39.1% 327,662	11.5% 96,701
1964	69.8% 495,490	30.2% 214,293	0.1% 462
1960	52.5% 204,614	47.3% 184,499	0.1% 593

Population density in the Washington urban area

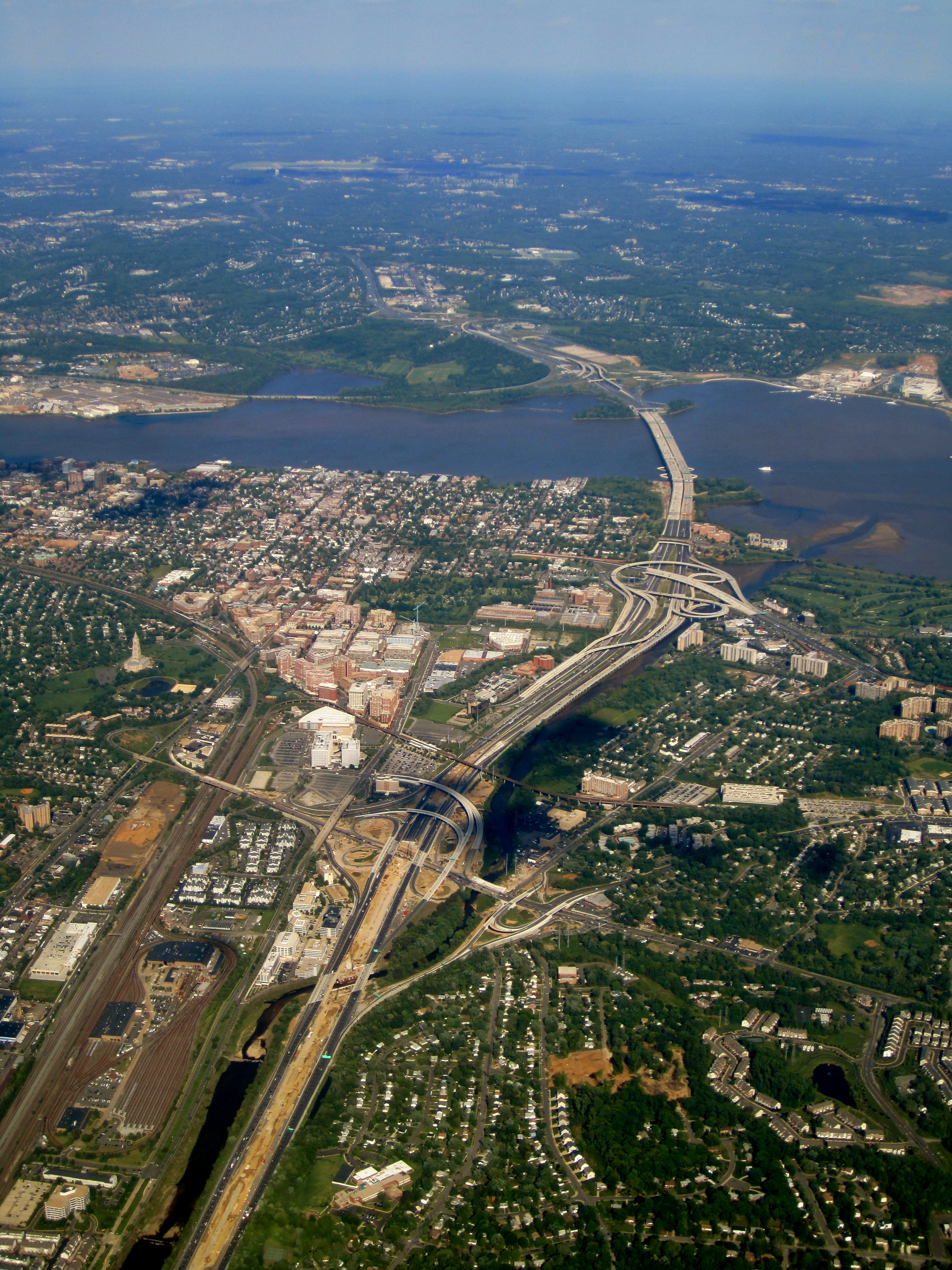
The southern portion of the Capital Beltway along the Potomac River, featuring portions of Washington, D.C., Maryland, and Virginia. Old Town Alexandria, Joint Base Anacostia-Bolling, and National Harbor, Maryland are visible.

== Demographics ==
=== Racial composition ===
The area has been a magnet for international immigration since the late 1960s. It is also a magnet for internal migration (persons moving from one region of the U.S. to another).

Racial composition of the Washington metropolitan area.

==== 2021 American Community Survey ====
- Non-Hispanic White: 43%
- Black or African American: 24% (including African 5.4%, West Indian 1.2%, and Ethiopian 0.8%)
- Hispanic or Latino: 17%
- Asian: 11%
- Mixed and other: 6%

Hispanic origin	Asian origin
5.2% Salvadoran	2.9% Indian
2.3% Mexican	1.9% Chinese
1.6% Guatemalan	1.2% Korean
1.2% Puerto Rican	1.2% Vietnamese
0.9% Honduran	1.0% Filipino
0.9% Peruvian	0.5% Pakistani
0.8% Bolivian	0.2% Japanese
0.5% Colombian	0.2% Thai
0.5% Dominican	0.2% Bangladeshi
5.6% Other	1.0% Other

Source: Census Reporter

==== 2010 U.S. Census ====
- White: 54.8%
- Black: 25.8%
- Asian: 9.3%
- Hispanic: 13.8%
- Mixed and other: 3.7%

==== 2006 ====
- White: 51.7%
- Black: 26.3%
- Asian: 8.4%
- Hispanic: 11.6%
- Mixed and other: 2.0%

==== 1980 ====
- White: 67.8%
- Black: 26.0%
- Asian: 2.5%
- Hispanic: 2.8%
- Mixed and other: 0.9%

=== Social indicators ===
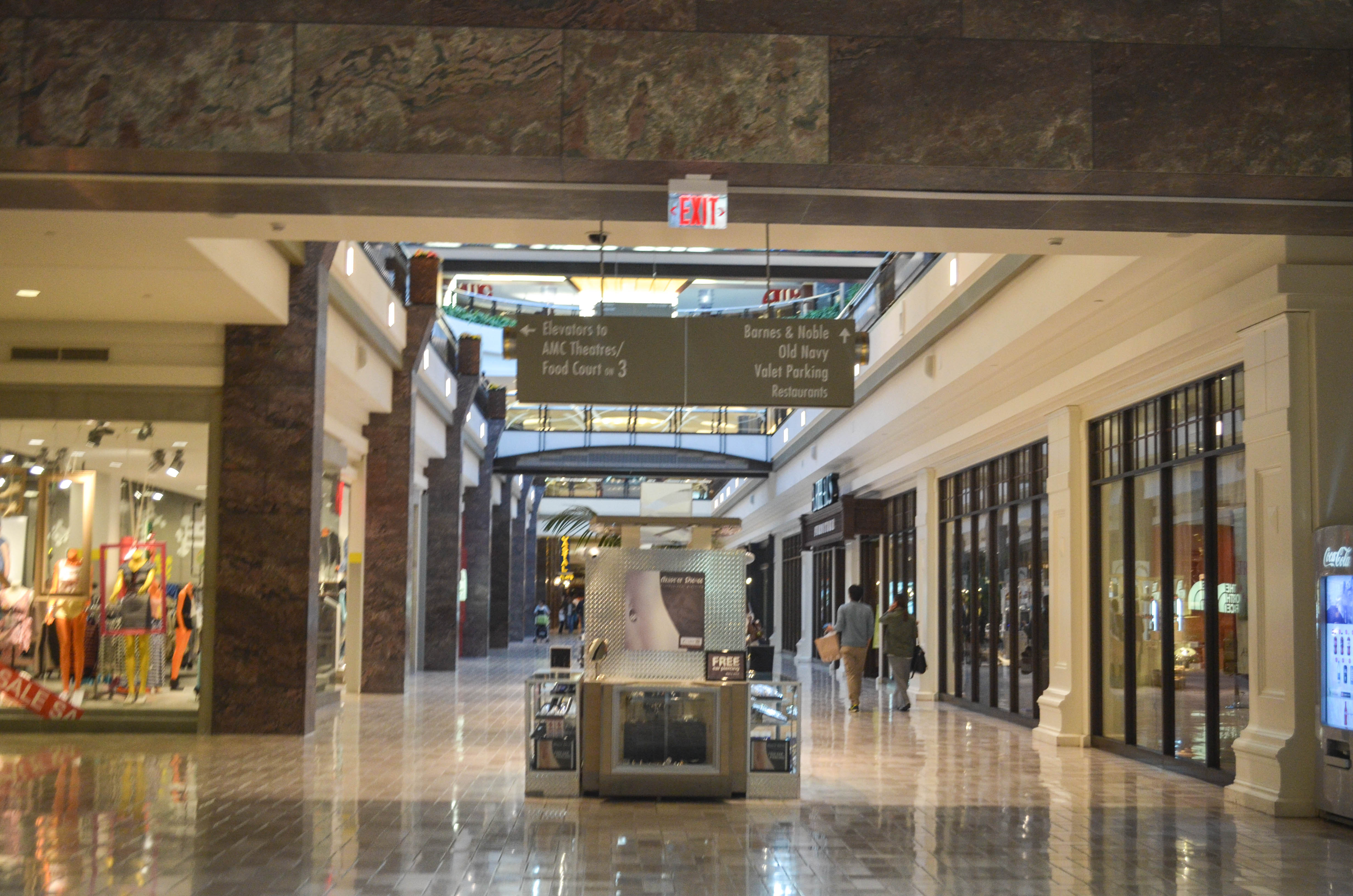
The average household income within a 5 mi (8.0 km) radius of Tysons Corner Center is $174,809.

The Washington metropolitan area has ranked as the highest-educated metropolitan area in the nation for four decades. As of the 2006–2008 American Community Survey, the three most educated places with 200,000 people or more in Washington–Arlington–Alexandria by bachelor's degree attainment (population 25 and over) are Arlington, Virginia (68.0%), Fairfax County, Virginia (58.8%), and Montgomery County, Maryland (56.4%). Forbes magazine stated in its 2008 "America's Best- And Worst-Educated Cities" report: "The D.C. area is less than half the size of L.A., but both cities have around 100,000 Ph.D.'s."

The Washington metropolitan area has held the top spot in the American College of Sports Medicine's annual American Fitness Index ranking of the United States' 50 most populous metropolitan areas for two years running. The report cites, among other things, the high average fitness level and healthy eating habits of residents, the widespread availability of health care and facilities such as swimming pools, tennis courts, and parks, low rates of obesity and tobacco use relative to the national average, and the high median household income as contributors to the city's community health.

In the 21st century, the Washington metropolitan area has overtaken the San Francisco Bay Area as the highest-income metropolitan area in the nation. The median household income of the region is US$72,800. The two highest median household income counties in the nation – Loudoun and Fairfax County, Virginia – are components of the MSA (and No. 3 is Howard County, officially in Baltimore's sphere but strongly connected with Washington's); measured in this way, Alexandria ranks 10th among municipalities in the region – 11th if Howard is included – and 23rd in the entire United States. 12.2% of Northern Virginia's 881,136 households, 8.5% of suburban Maryland's 799,300 households, and 8.2% of Washington's 249,805 households have an annual income in excess of $200,000, compared to 3.7% nationally.

According to a report by the American Human Development Project, women in the Washington metropolitan area are ranked as having the highest income and educational attainment among the 25 most populous metropolitan areas in the nation, while Asian American women in the region had the highest life expectancy, at 92.3 years.

== Economy ==
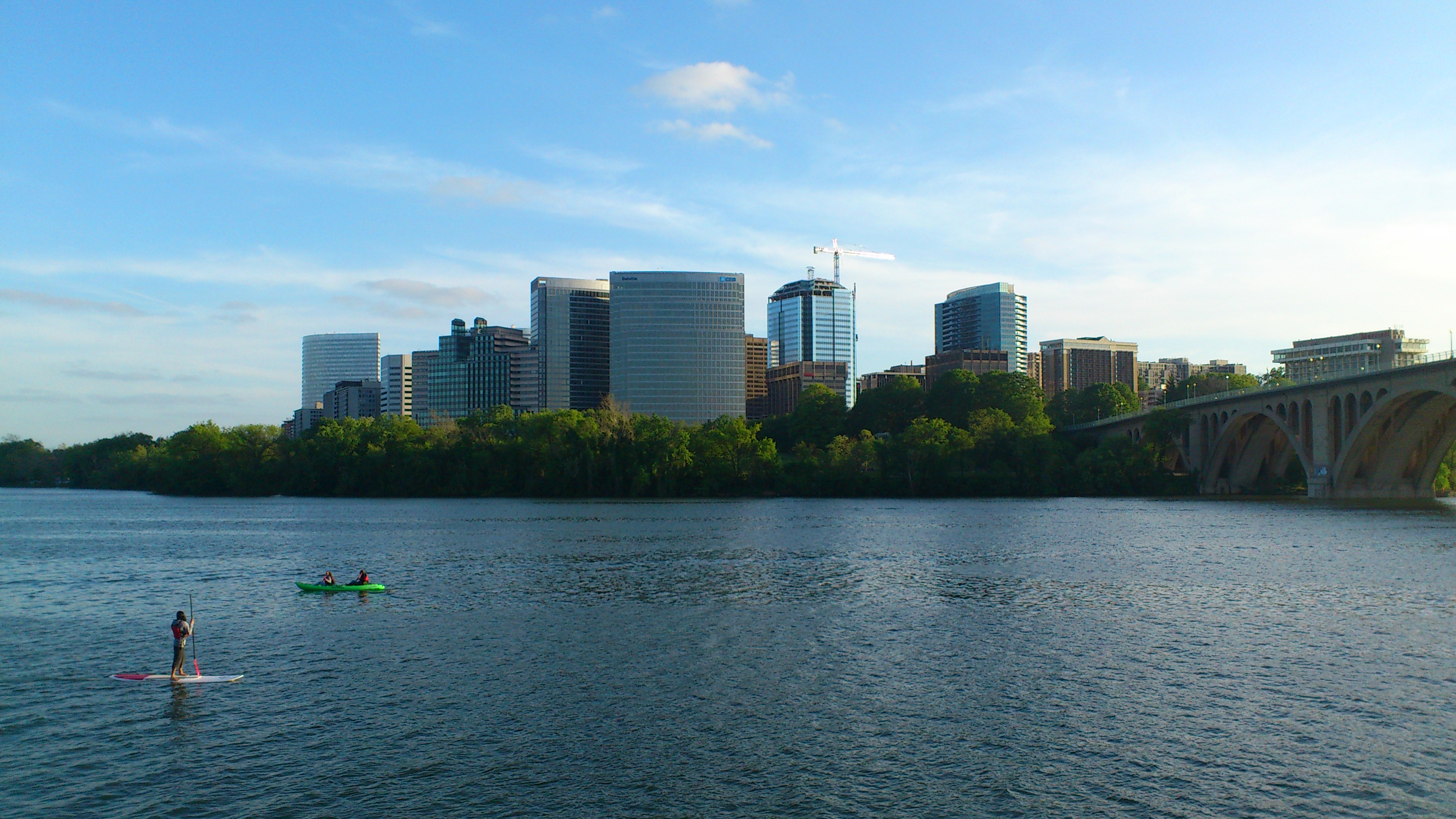
Rosslyn is home to the tallest high-rises in the region, partly due to the District's height restrictions. As a result, many of the region's tallest buildings are located outside of Washington, D.C.

The Washington metropolitan area has the largest science and engineering work force of any metropolitan area in the nation in 2006 according to the Greater Washington Initiative at 324,530, ahead of the combined San Francisco Bay Area work force of 214,500, and Chicago metropolitan area at 203,090, citing data from U.S. Census Bureau, the Bureau of Labor Statistics, Claritas Inc., and other sources.

The Washington metropolitan area was ranked as the second best High-Tech Center in a statistical analysis of the top 100 Metropolitan areas in the United States by American City Business Journals in May 2009, behind the Silicon Valley and ahead of the Boston metropolitan area. Fueling the metropolitan area's ranking was the reported 241,264 tech jobs in the region, a total eclipsed only by New York, Los Angeles, and the San Francisco Bay Area, as well as the highest master's or doctoral degree attainment among the 100 ranked metropolitan areas. A Dice.com report showed that the Washington–Baltimore area had the second-highest number of tech jobs listed: 8,289, after the New York metro area with 9,195 jobs. In 2020, the total gross domestic product for the Washington-Arlington-Alexandria, DC-VA-MD-WV (MSA) was $561,027,941,000.

=== Real estate and housing market ===
Changes in house prices for the Washington metropolitan area are publicly tracked on a regular basis using the Case–Shiller index; the statistic is published by Standard & Poor's and is also a component of S&P's 10-city composite index of the value of the U.S. residential real estate market.

McLean ZIP code 22102 had the highest median home prices among ZIP codes within the Washington metropolitan area as of 2013.

=== Net worth, wealth disparities, and business ownership ===
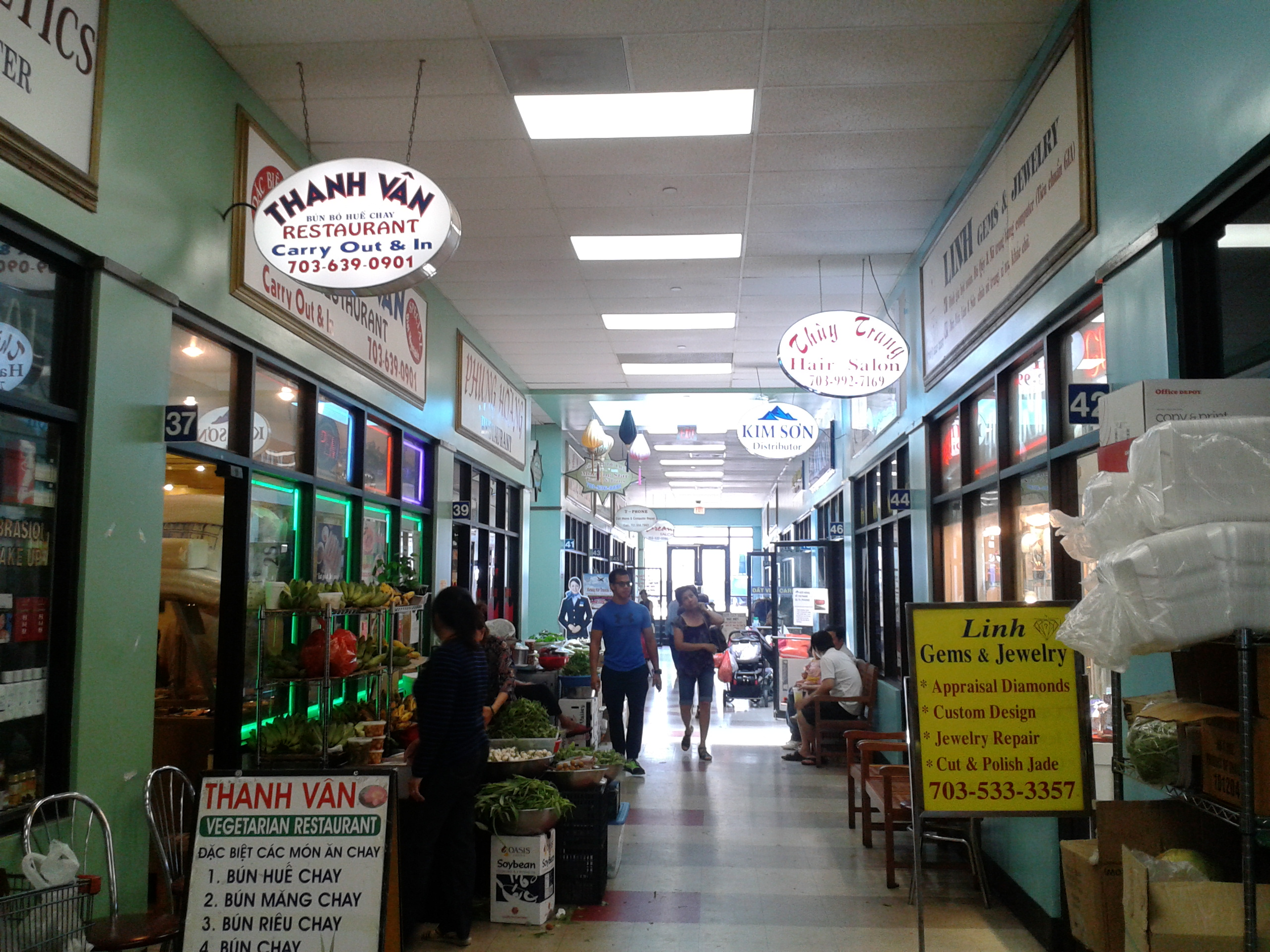
Vietnamese restaurants and shops at the Eden Center in Falls Church, Virginia

The economy of the Washington metropolitan region is characterized by significant wealth disparities, which were heightened by the Great Recession and the 2007–09 housing crisis, which adversely affected black and Hispanic households more than other households.

A 2016 Urban Institute report found that the median net worth (i.e., assets minus debt) for white households in the D.C. region was $284,000, while the median net worth for Hispanic–Latino households was $13,000, and for African American households as $3,500. Asian Americans had the highest median net worth in the Washington area ($220,000 for Chinese American households, $430,000 for Vietnamese American households, $496,000 for Korean American households, and $573,000 for Indian American households).

Although the median net worth for white D.C.-area households was 81 times that of black D.C.-area households, the two groups had comparable rates of business ownership (about 9%). The Urban Institute report suggests that this "may be driven by the presence of a large federal government and a local district government whose membership and constituents have been largely Black, coupled with government policies designed to increase contracting opportunities for minority-owned businesses".

=== Primary industries ===
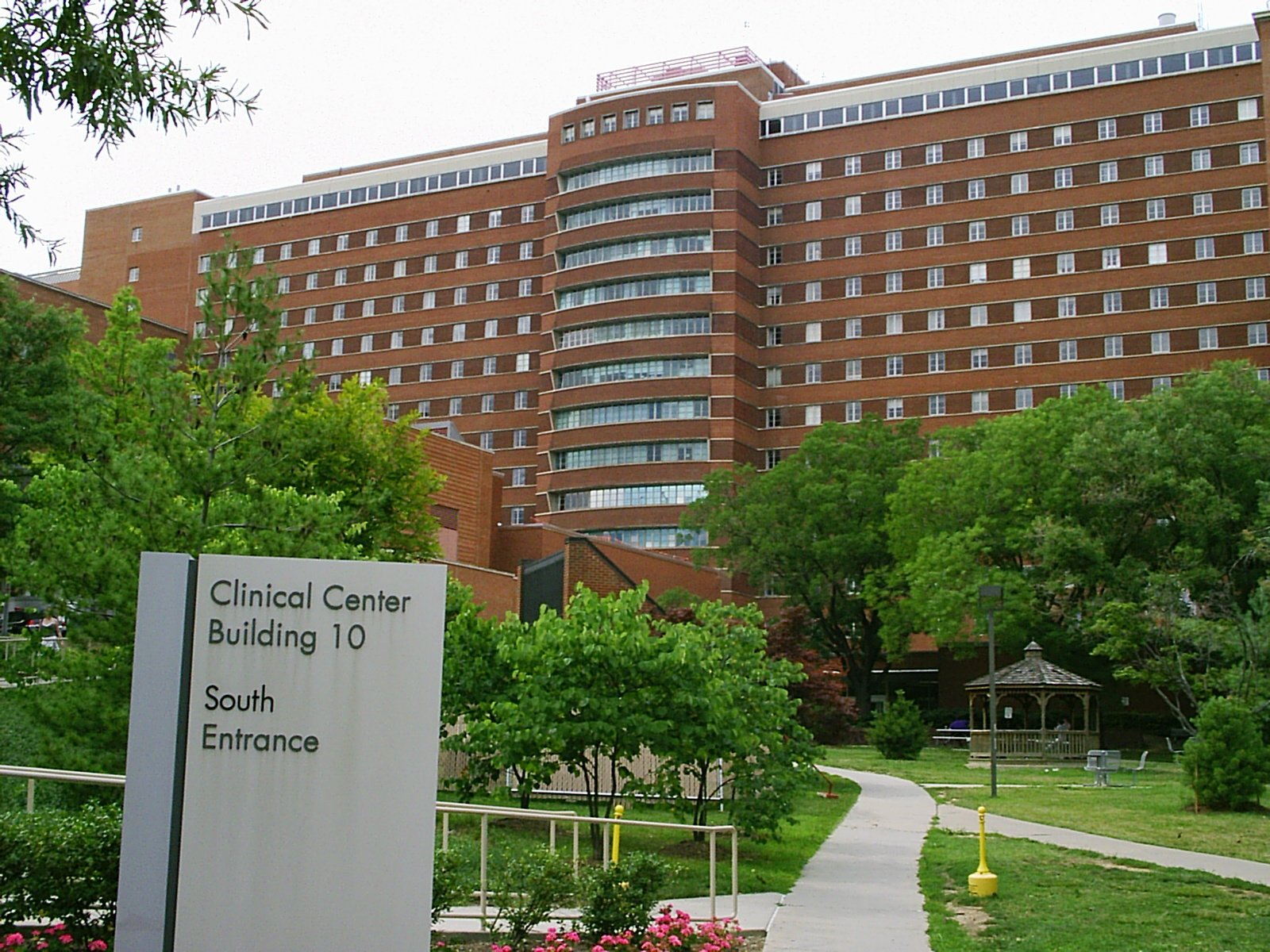
National Institutes of Health Clinical Center in Bethesda

==== Biotechnology ====
The Washington metropolitan area has a significant biotechnology industry; companies with a major presence in the region as of 2011 include Merck, Pfizer, Human Genome Sciences, Martek Biosciences, and Qiagen. Additionally, many biotechnology companies such as United Therapeutics, Novavax, Emergent BioSolutions, Parabon NanoLabs and MedImmune have headquarters in the region. The area is also home to branch offices of many contract research organizations. Firms with a presence in the area include Fortrea, IQVIA, Charles River Laboratories, and ICON plc. The area's medical research is driven by government and non-profit health institutions, such as the Howard Hughes Medical Institute, J. Craig Venter Institute, and the National Institutes of Health.

==== Consumer goods ====
Local consumer goods companies include Nestle USA and Mars, Incorporated.

==== Defense contracting ====
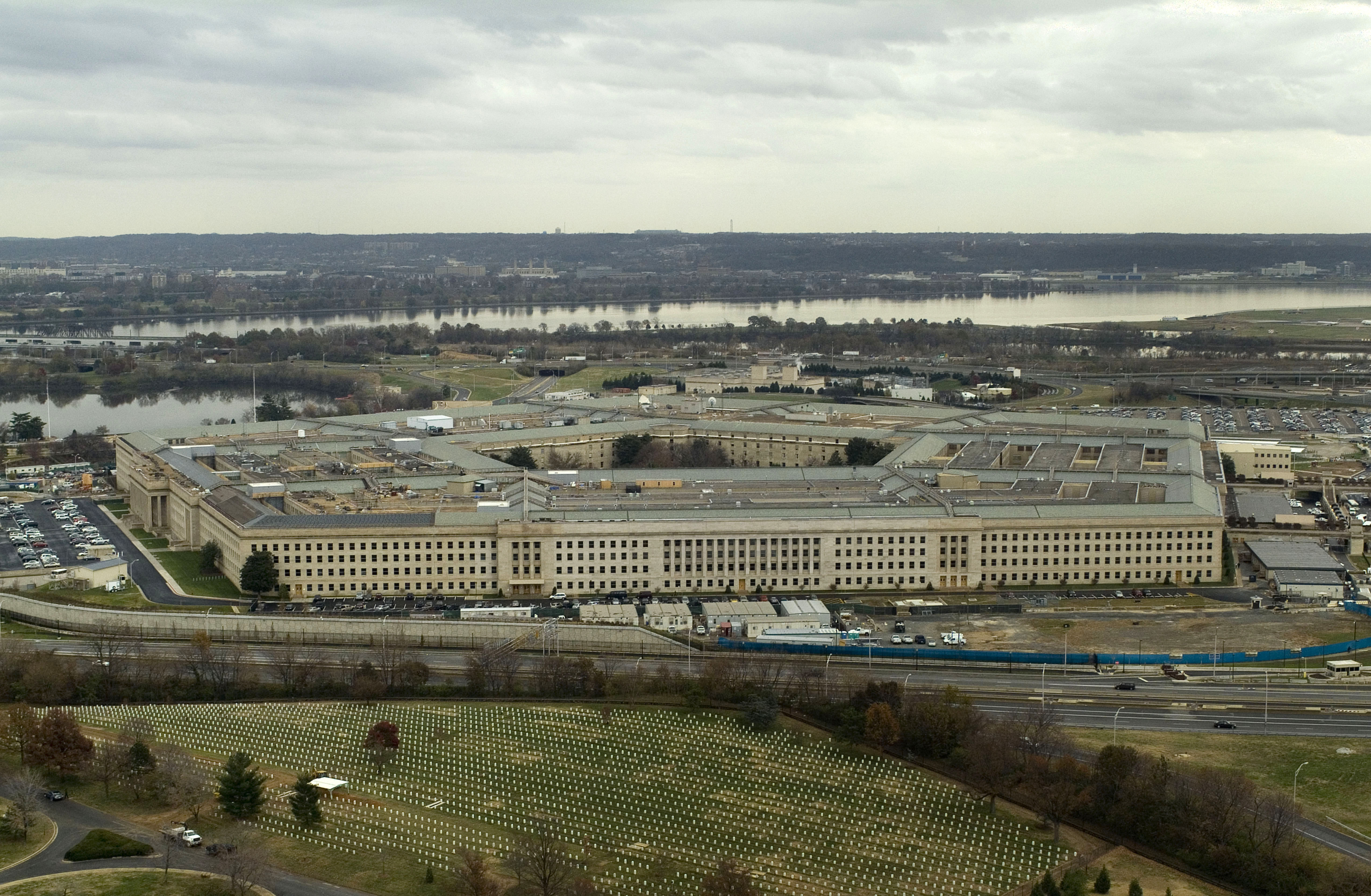
Many defense contractors are headquartered in the Washington area near the Pentagon in Arlington.

Many defense contractors are based in the region to be close to the Pentagon in Arlington. Local defense contractors include Lockheed Martin, the largest, as well as General Dynamics, BAE Systems Inc., Northrop Grumman, Computer Sciences Corporation (CSC), Science Applications International Corporation (SAIC), CACI, ManTech International, DynCorp, and Leidos.

==== Hospitality ====
The Washington metropolitan area contains the headquarters of numerous companies in the hospitality and hotel industries. Major companies with headquarters in the region include Marriott International, The Ritz-Carlton Hotel Company, Hilton Worldwide, Park Hotels and Resorts, Choice Hotels, Host Hotels and Resorts, and HMSHost.

==== Mass media ====
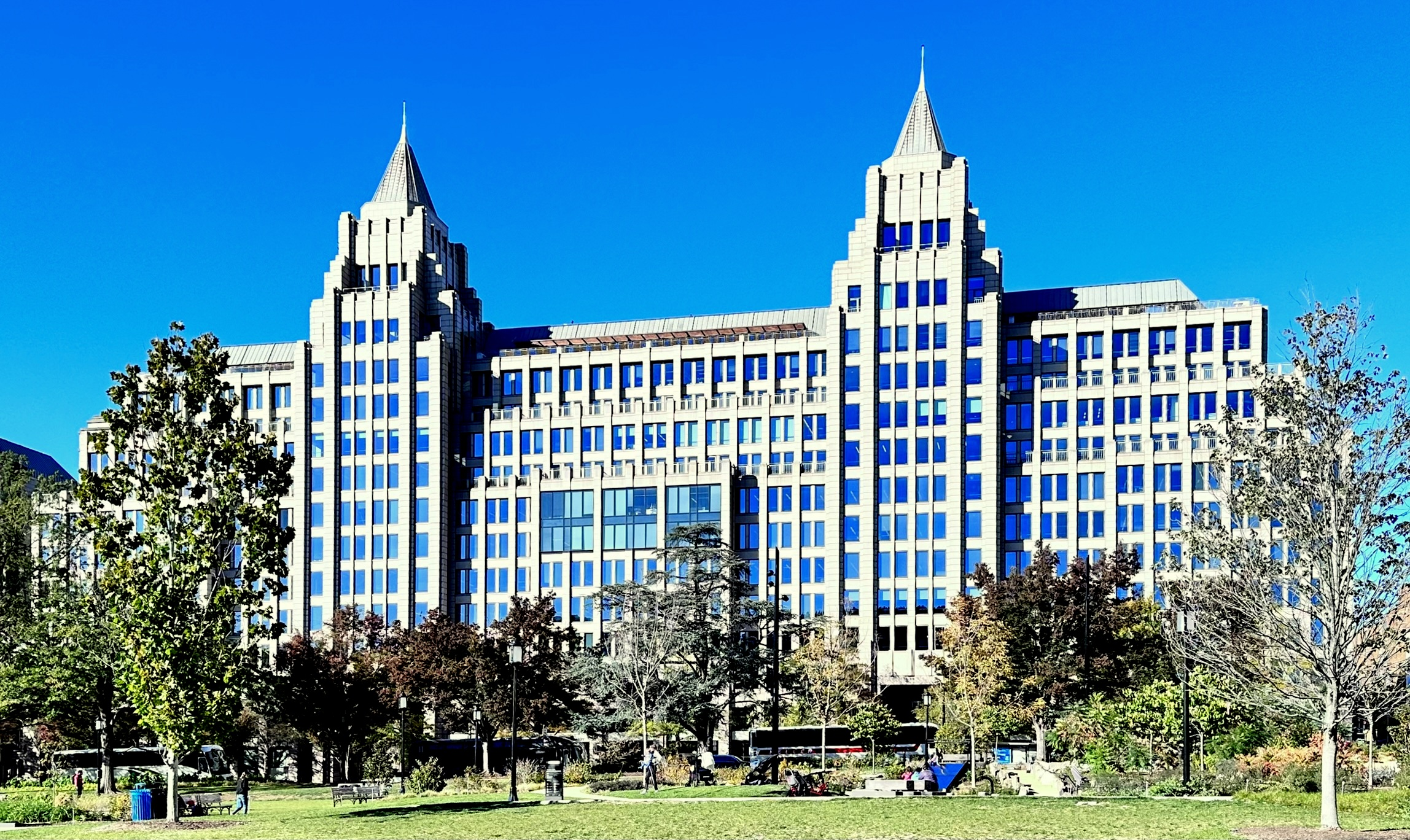
One Franklin Square is where The Washington Post is headquartered.

The media industry is a significant portion of metropolitan Washington's economy. According to the Bureau of Labor Statistics, the Washington DC region has the second largest concentration of journalists and media personnel in the United States after the New York metropolitan area. Washington's industry presence includes major publications with national audiences such as The Washington Post, U.S. News & World Report, and USA Today, as well as new media publishers such as Vox Media, RealClearPolitics, Axios, and Politico. A secondary portion of this market is made up of periodicals such as National Affairs, those by The Slate Group, Foreign Policy, National Geographic, The American Prospect, and those by Atlantic Media, including The Atlantic. There are also many smaller regional publications present, such as The Washington Diplomat, The Hill, Hill Rag, Roll Call, Washington City Paper and the Washington Examiner.

==== Telecommunications ====
Anchored by the Dulles Technology Corridor, the telecommunications and tech industry in DC spans a diverse range of players across internet infrastructure, broadcasting, satellite communications, and datacenters. Firms headquartered in the area include Cogent Communications, GTT Communications, Hughes Network Systems, iCore Networks, Iridium Communications, Intelsat, Ligado Networks, NII Holdings, Oceus Networks, OneWeb, Tegna Inc., Transaction Network Services, Verisign, WorldCell, and XO Communications.

==== Tourism ====
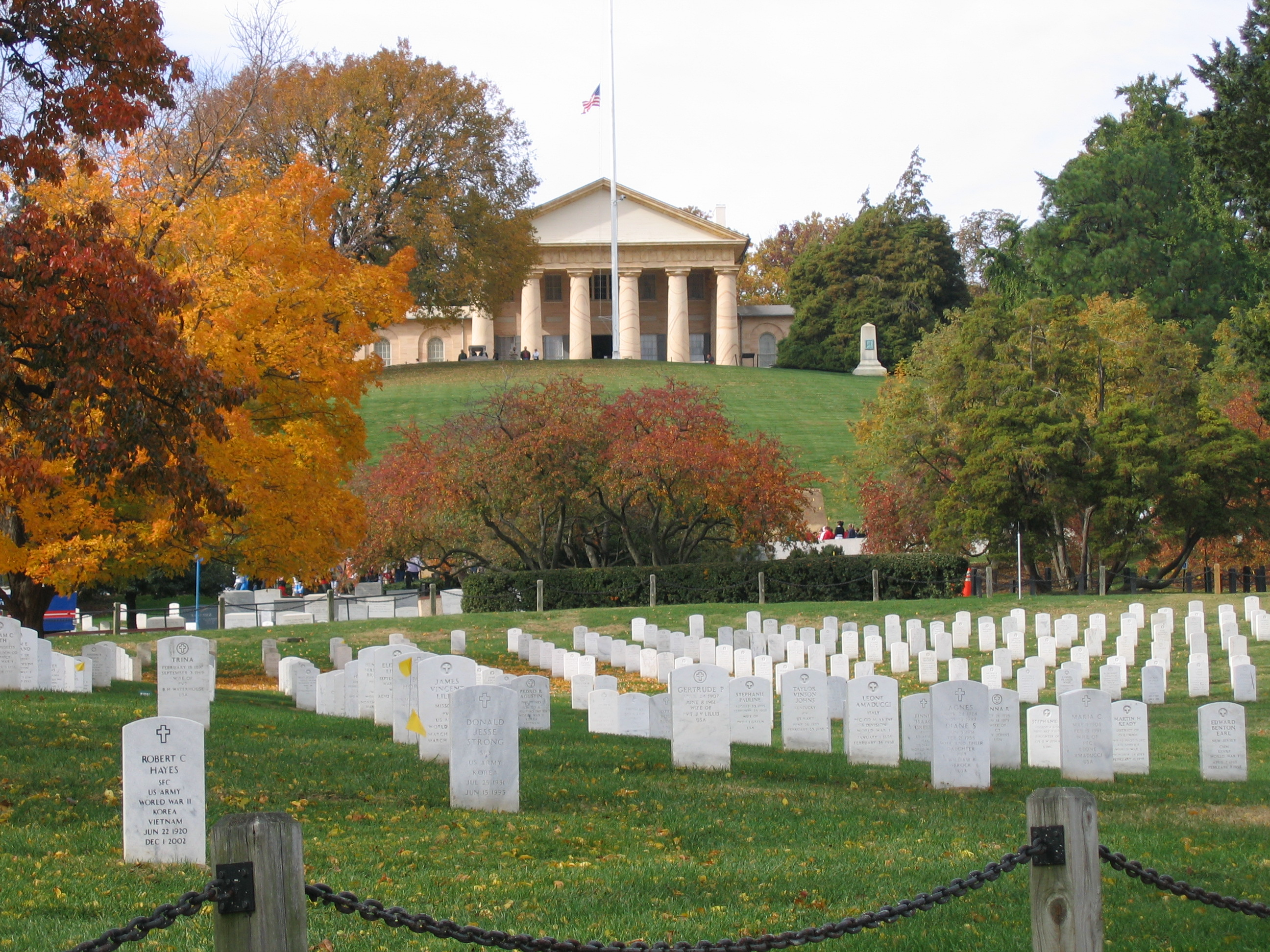
Arlington National Cemetery in Arlington County is a major tourist attraction.

Tourism is a significant industry in the Washington metropolitan region. In 2015, more than 74,000 tourism-sector jobs existed in the District of Columbia, a record-setting 19.3 million domestic tourists visited the city, and domestic and international tourists combined spent $7.1 billion. The convention industry is also significant; in 2016, D.C. hosted fifteen "city-wide conventions" with an estimated total economic impact of $277.9 million.

Tourism is also significant outside the District of Columbia; in 2015, a record-setting $3.06 billion in tourism spending was reported in Arlington, Virginia, and $2.9 billion in Fairfax County, Virginia. A 2016 National Park Service report estimated that there were 56 million visitors to national parks in the National Capital Region, sustaining 16,917 and generating close to $1.6 billion in economy impact.

=== Largest companies ===
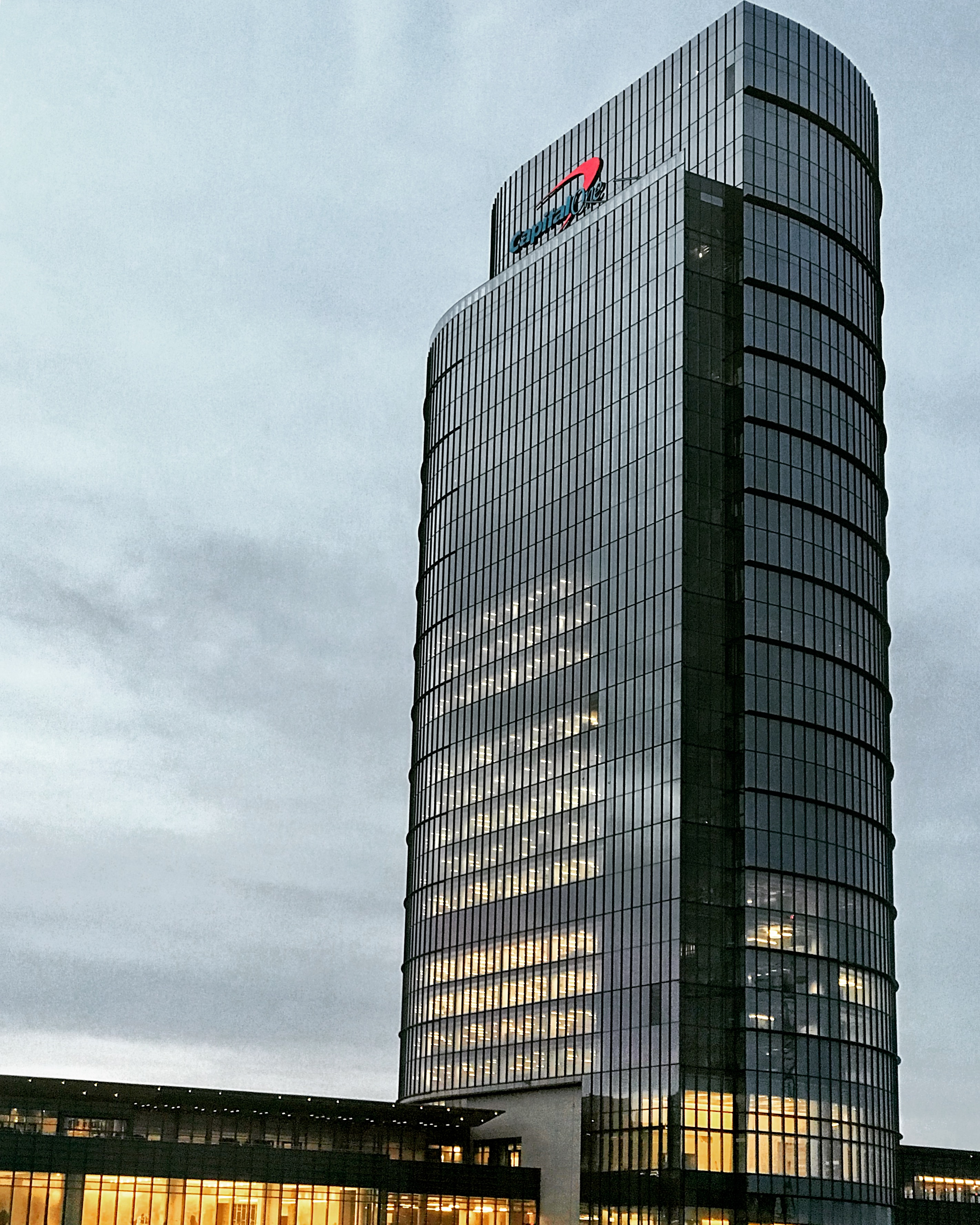
Capital One Tower in Tysons, the tallest building in the region and centerpiece of the 5,000,000 sq ft (464,500 m^{2}) headquarters campus for Capital One

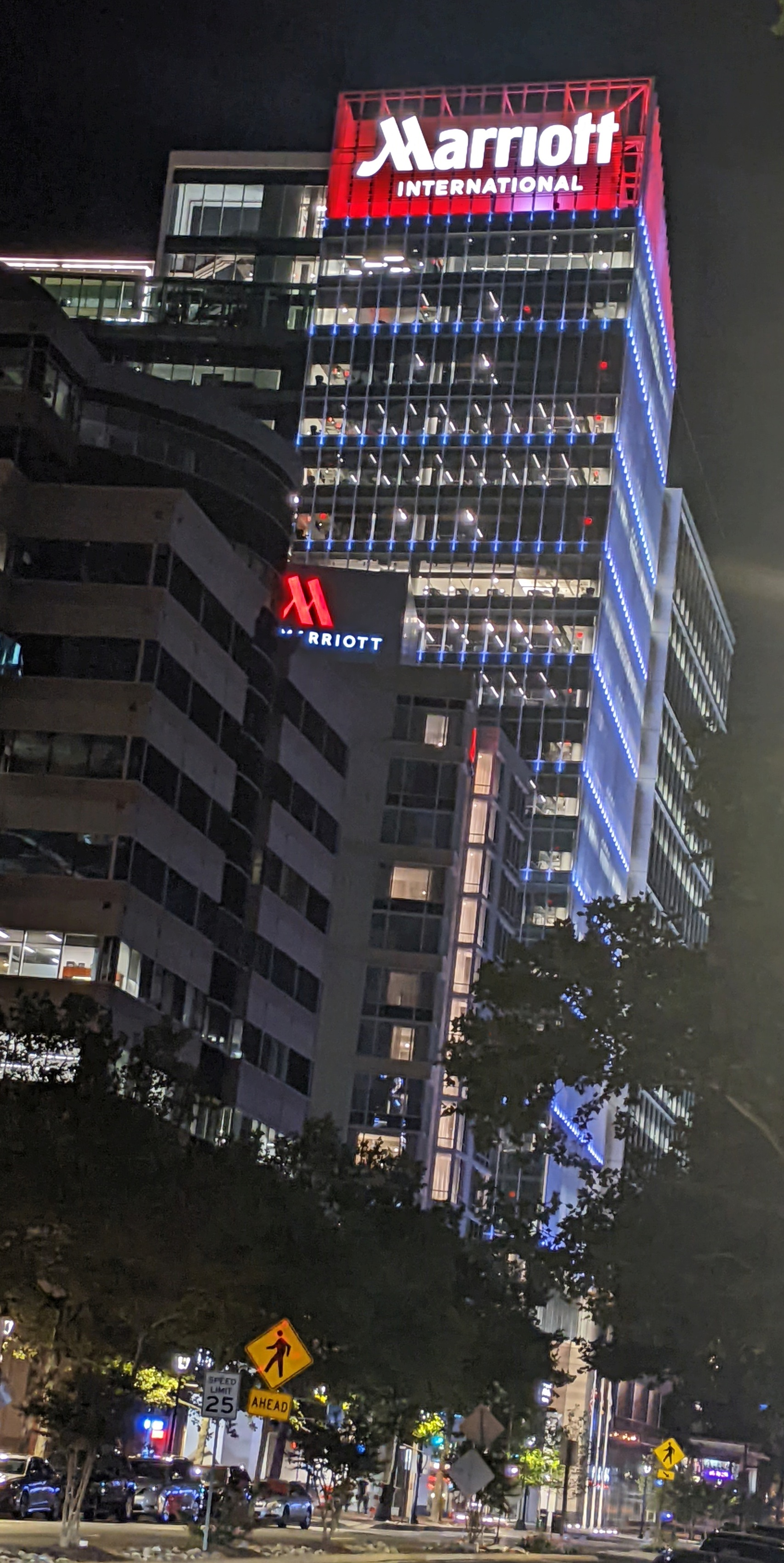
The global headquarters of Marriott International in Bethesda, Maryland

Most of the following companies are located along Interstate 66 and Dulles Toll Road from Washington, D.C. to Dulles International Airport. Amazon is dual-headquartered in Seattle and secondarily in Arlington.

Largest public companies (Fortune 500 2024)
Company	Industry	Headquarters	National rank
AES Corporation	Energy	Arlington, Virginia	319
Beacon Building Products	Roofing	Herndon, Virginia	429
Boeing	Aerospace	Arlington, Virginia	52
Booz Allen Hamilton	Consulting	McLean, Virginia	422
Capital One	Finance	McLean, Virginia	91
Danaher Corporation	Medical products	Washington, D.C.	153
DXC Technology	Information technology	Ashburn, Virginia	155
Fannie Mae	Finance	Washington, D.C.	27
Freddie Mac	Finance	McLean, Virginia	36
General Dynamics	Defense	Reston, Virginia	104
Hilton Hotels Corporation	Hospitality	McLean, Virginia	389
Leidos	Defense	Reston, Virginia	266
Lockheed Martin	Defense	Bethesda, Maryland	57
Marriott International	Hospitality	Bethesda, Maryland	173
Northrop Grumman	Defense	Falls Church, Virginia	109
NVR, Inc.	Construction	Reston, Virginia	406
RTX Corporation	Defense	Arlington, Virginia	55
SAIC	Information technology	Reston, Virginia	479
Xylem Inc.	Water treatment	Washington, D.C.	486

=== History ===
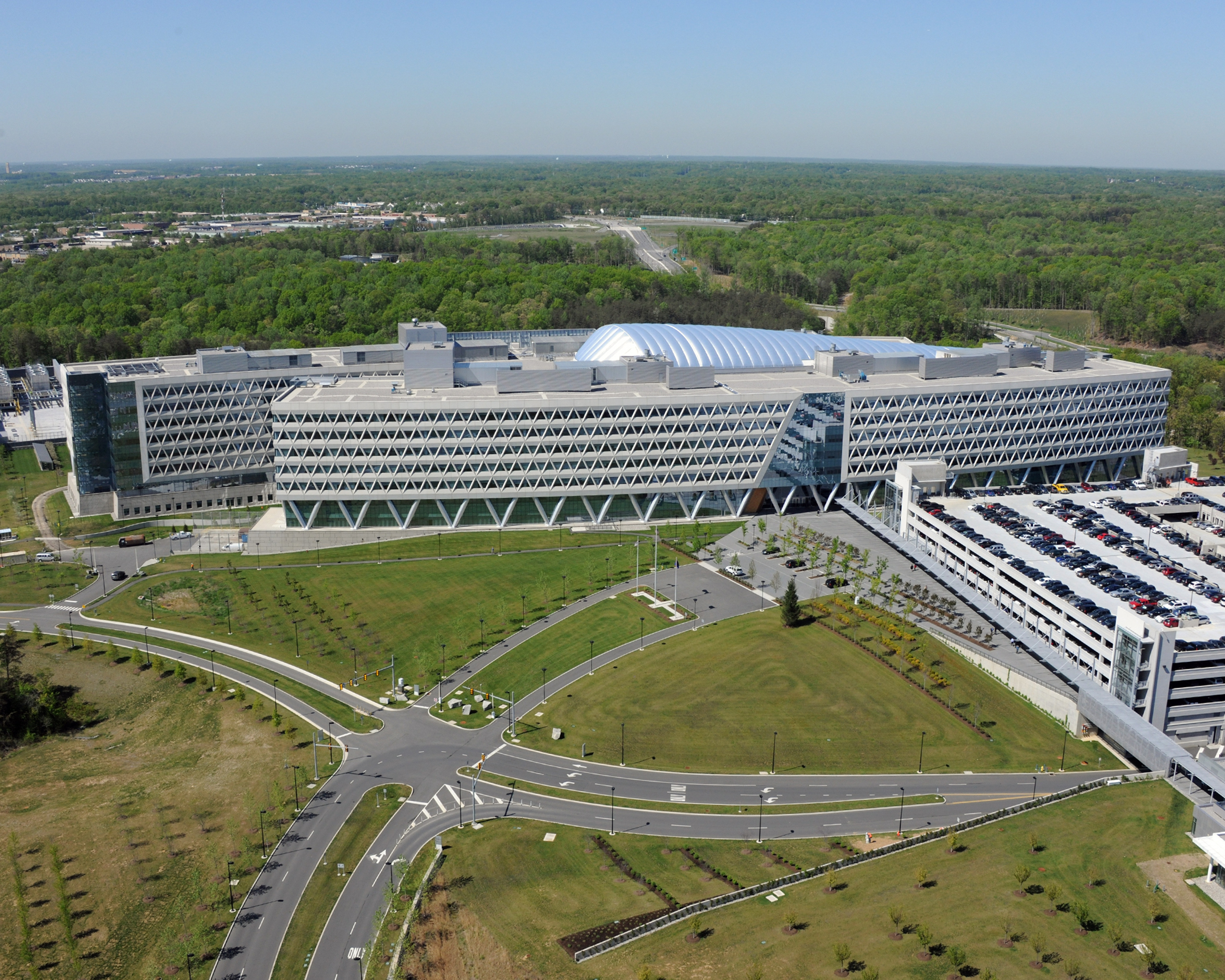
NGA headquarters in Fort Belvoir

The 2005 Base Realignment and Closure resulted in a significant shuffling of military, civilian, and defense contractor employees in the Washington metropolitan area. The largest individual site impacts of the time are as follows:

- Fort Belvoir gained 11,858 employees, primarily as a result of the relocation of the National Geospatial-Intelligence Agency (NGA) into a massive new headquarters within the fort.
- Fort Meade gained 5,361 employees, primarily as a result of the expansion of the National Security Agency.
- Walter Reed Army Medical Center lost 5,630 employees as part of its realignment. It was later closed and consolidated into Walter Reed National Military Medical Center.

BRAC 2005 was the largest infrastructure expansion by the Army Corps of Engineers since World War II, resulting in the Mark Center, tallest building they have ever constructed, as well as National Geospatial-Intelligence Agency Campus East, which at 2.4 million square feet is the largest building the Corps have constructed since the Pentagon.

== Transportation ==
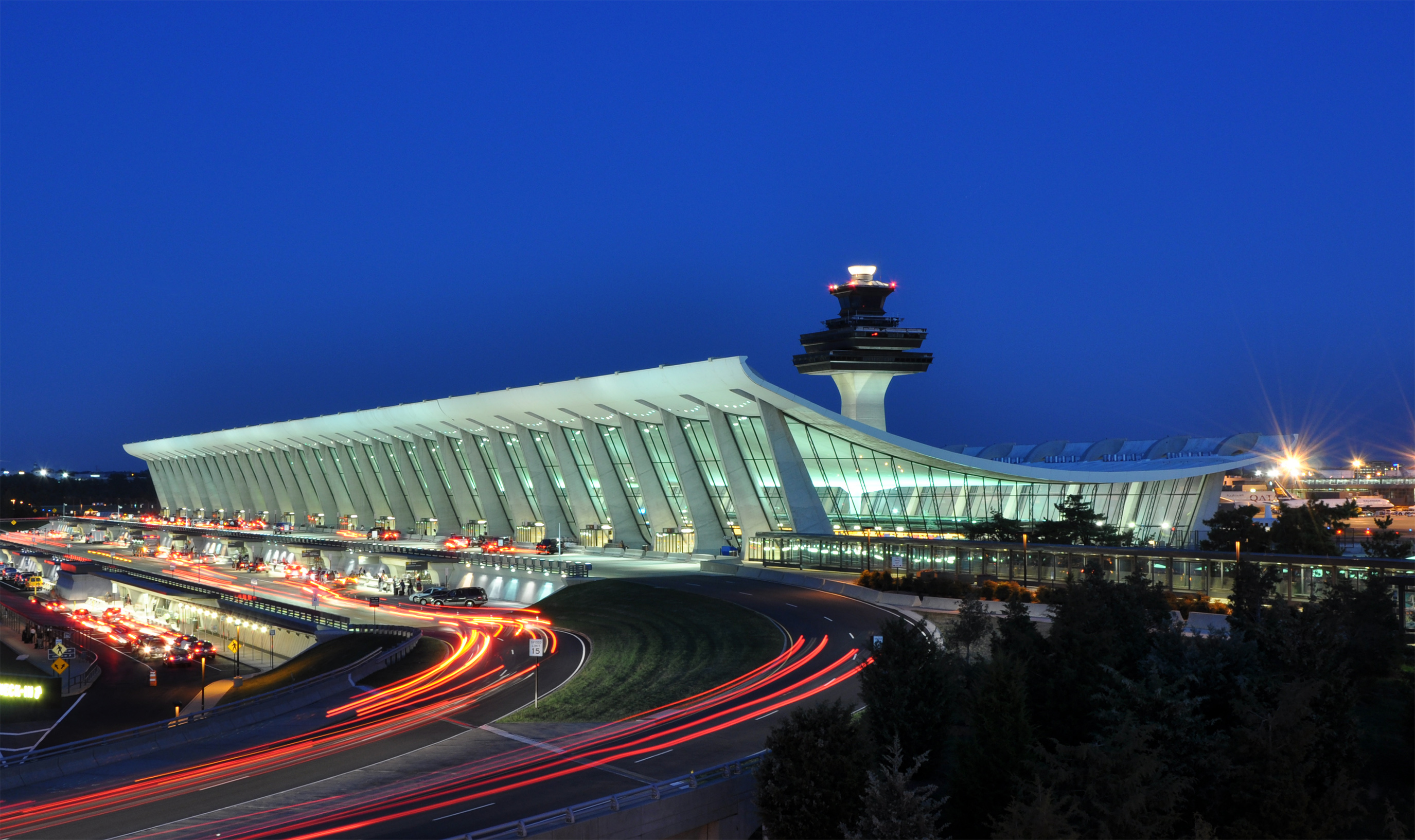
Dulles International Airport in Dulles, Virginia

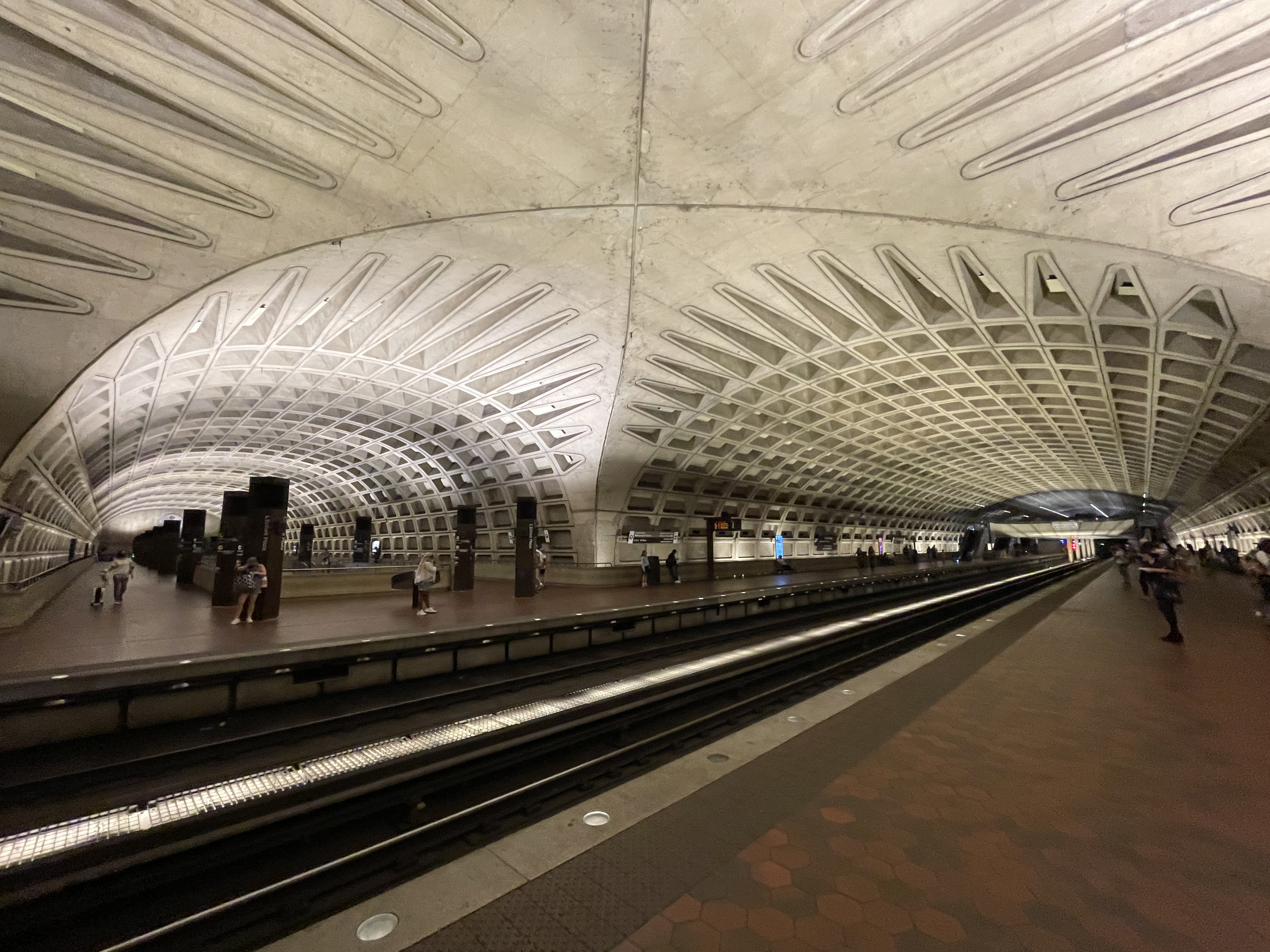
L'Enfant Plaza on the Washington Metro

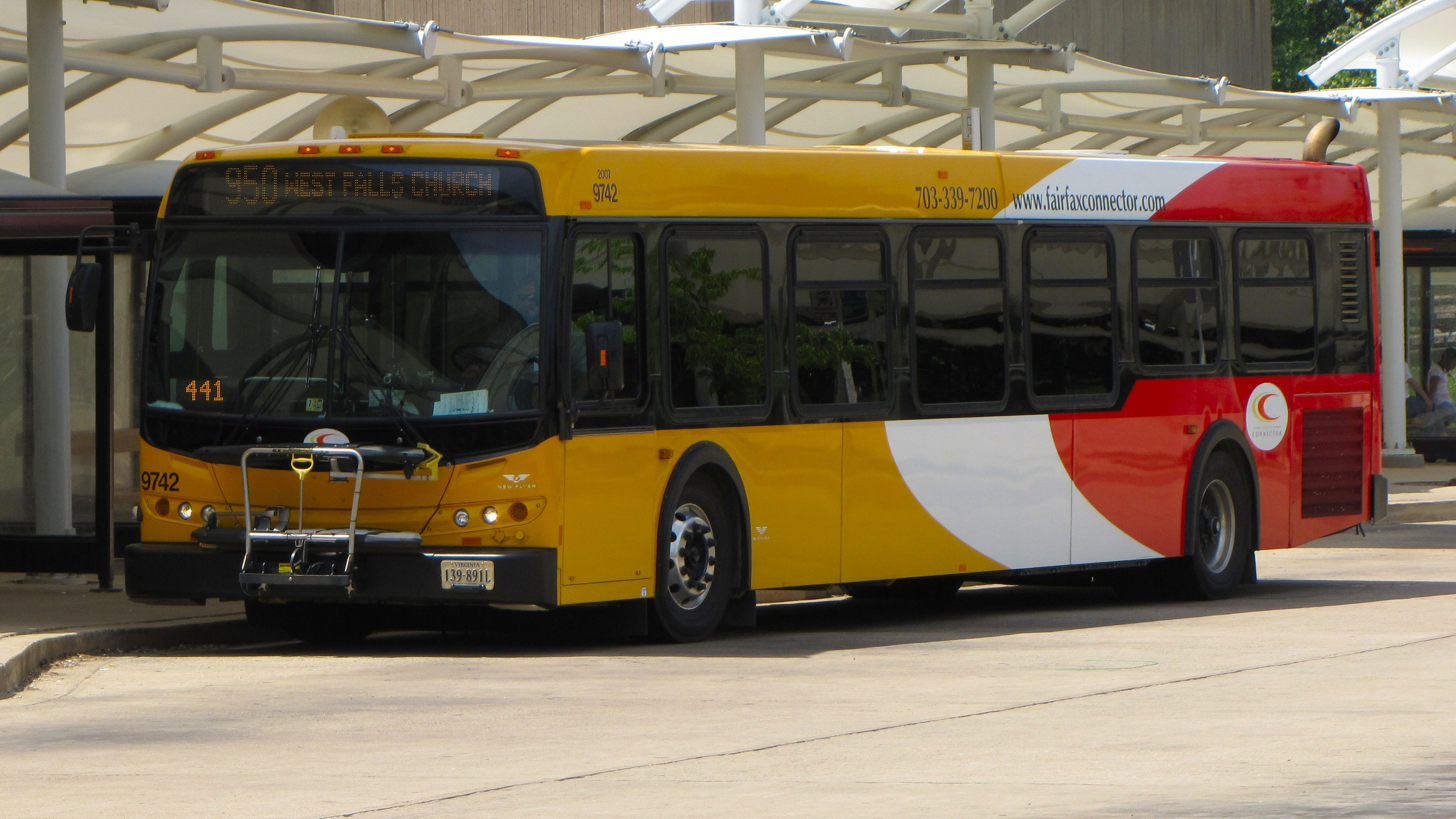
A Fairfax Connector bus at the West Falls Church station on the Washington Metro

"WMATA"-indicated systems are run by Washington Metropolitan Area Transit Authority and always accept Washington Metro fare cards; others may or may not.

=== Commercial service airports ===
- Dulles International Airport (IAD), located in Loudoun County, Virginia
- Ronald Reagan Washington National Airport (DCA), located in Arlington County, Virginia – the closest to Washington
- Baltimore–Washington International Thurgood Marshall Airport (BWI), located in Linthicum, Maryland (outside of but serving the Washington metropolitan area)
- Hagerstown Regional Airport (HGR), located in Washington County, Maryland – serves western Maryland, the Eastern Panhandle of West Virginia, and portions of south-central Pennsylvania and north-western Virginia along the Interstate 81 corridor

=== Rail transit systems ===
- Washington Metro – DC, MD, VA (rapid transit) (WMATA)
- MARC Train – DC, MD, WV (commuter rail)
- Virginia Railway Express – DC, VA (commuter rail)
- Amtrak – US (commuter rail, inter-city rail)

=== Bus transit systems ===
- Metrobus – Washington metropolitan area (WMATA)
- Metroway – Arlington County, Virginia and Alexandria, Virginia (bus rapid transit) (WMATA)
- Ride On – Montgomery County, Maryland
- TheBus – Prince George's County, Maryland
- ART – Arlington County, Virginia
- DASH – Alexandria, Virginia
- Fairfax Connector – Fairfax County, Virginia
- CUE Bus – Fairfax, Virginia
- Loudoun County Transit – Loudoun County, Virginia
- PRTC – Prince William County, Manassas and Manassas Park
- TransIT – Frederick County, Maryland
- VanGO – Charles County, Maryland
- Regional Transportation Agency of Central Maryland – Howard County, Anne Arundel County, Prince George's County, Laurel, Maryland
- Maryland Transit Administration – Washington, D.C., Montgomery County, Maryland, Prince George's County, Frederick County, Maryland, Charles County, Maryland, Calvert County, Maryland, Howard County, Anne Arundel County, Saint Mary's County, Maryland
- Eastern Panhandle Transit Authority – Jefferson County, West Virginia, Berkeley County, West Virginia
- Virginia Regional Transit – Loudoun County, Virginia, Culpeper County, Virginia, Fauquier County, Virginia, Warren County, Virginia
- Fredericksburg Regional Transit – Fredericksburg, Spotsylvania County and Stafford County

=== Major roads ===
==== Interstates ====
The Capital Beltway circles Washington, D.C.

- I-66
- I-70
- I-95
- I-270
- I-295
- I-370
- I-395
- I-495 – the Capital Beltway
- I-595 – signed as US 50
- I-695

==== U.S. Highways ====
- US 1
- US 15
- US 17
- US 29
- US 50
- US 301

=== Bicycle sharing ===
- Capital Bikeshare – Washington, D.C., Arlington, Virginia, Alexandria, Virginia, Fairfax County, Virginia, Prince George's County, Maryland, and Montgomery County, Maryland

== Sports ==
Listing of the professional sports teams in the Washington metropolitan area:

Club	Sport	League	Founded	Venue
Washington Capitals	Hockey	NHL	1974	Capital One Arena
Washington Nationals	Baseball	MLB	2005 (Note: Year team moved to Washington area)	Nationals Park
Washington Wizards	Basketball	NBA	1973	Capital One Arena
Washington Commanders	Football	NFL	1932	Northwest Stadium
D.C. United	Soccer	MLS	1996	Audi Field
Washington Mystics	Basketball	WNBA	1998	CareFirst Arena
DC Defenders	Football	XFL	2018	Audi Field
Washington Spirit	Soccer	NWSL	2011 (Note: Founded as D.C. United Women; rebranded as Washington Spirit in 2012 and started NWSL play in 2013.)	Audi Field
Capital City Go-Go	Basketball	NBA G League	2018	CareFirst Arena
Old Glory DC	Rugby	MLR	2018	George Mason Stadium
Loudoun United FC	Soccer	USL Championship	2018	Segra Field
DC Hawks	Cricket	MiLC	2020	Veterans Memorial Park, Woodbridge, VA
Fredericksburg Nationals	Baseball	MiLB	2020	Virginia Credit Union Stadium
Chesapeake Baysox	Baseball	MiLB	1993	Prince George's Stadium
Southern Maryland Blue Crabs	Baseball	ALPB	2006	Regency Furniture Stadium

== Media ==
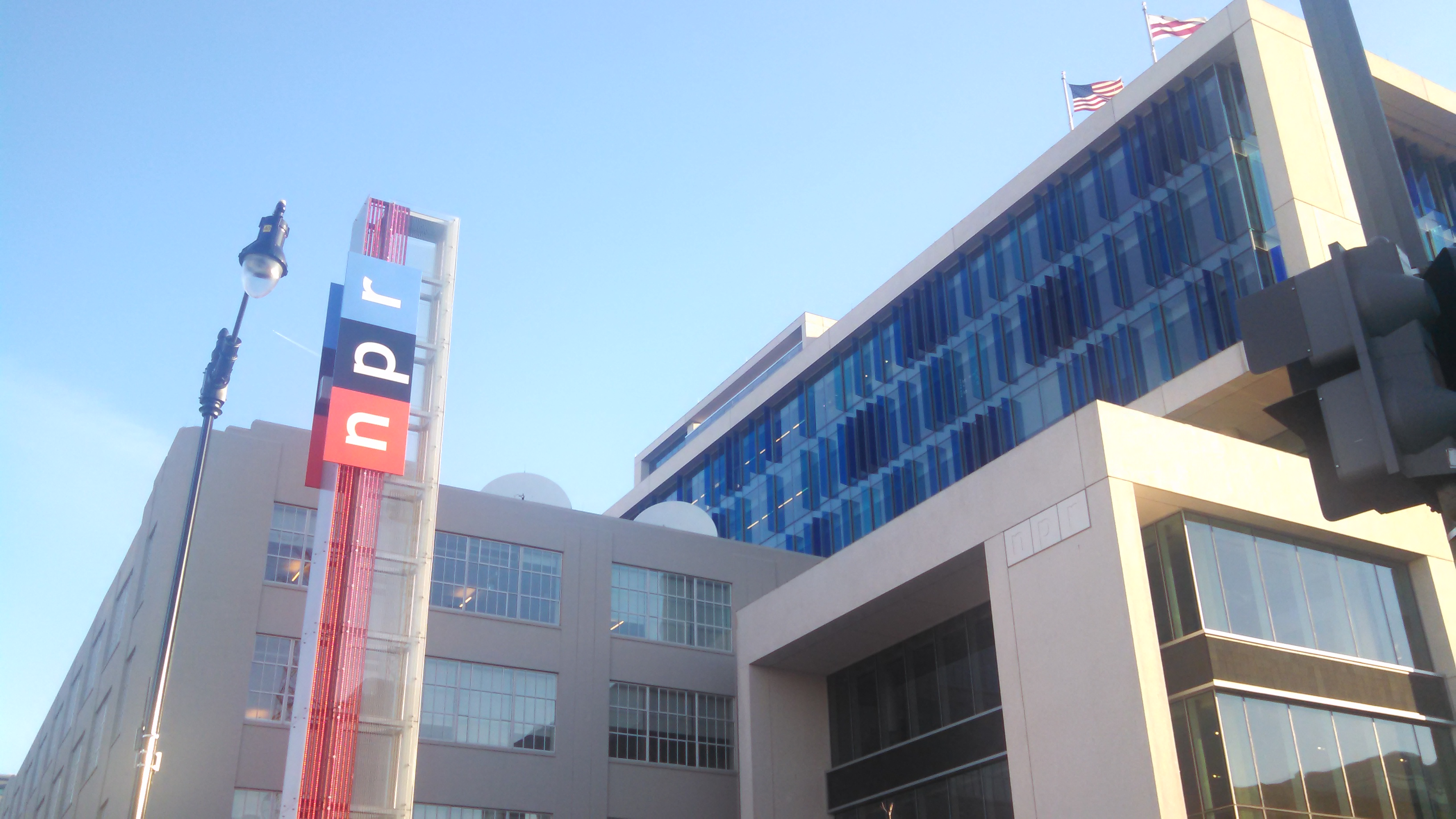
National Public Radio (NPR) headquarters in Washington

The Washington metropolitan area is home to DCTV, USA Today, C-SPAN, PBS, NPR, Politico, BET, TV One and Discovery Communications. The two main newspapers are The Washington Post and The Washington Times. Local television channels include WRC-TV 4 (NBC), WTTG 5 (FOX), WJLA 7 (ABC), WUSA 9 (CBS), WDCA 20 (MyNetworkTV), WETA-TV 26 (PBS), WDCW 50 (CW), and WPXW 66 (Ion). WJLA 24/7 News is a local news provider available only to cable subscribers. Radio stations serving the area include: WETA-FM, WIHT, WSBN, and WTOP.

== Area codes ==
- 202 and 771 – Washington, D.C.
- 703 and 571 – Northern Virginia suburbs of Arlington and Fairfax Counties, independent cities Alexandria, Fairfax, Falls Church, Manassas, Manassas Park, as well as parts of Fauquier, Loudoun, and Prince William Counties (571 created March 1, 2000; 703 in October 1947).
- 301, 240, and 227 – portions of Maryland in the Washington metropolitan area, southern Maryland, and western Maryland
- 540 and 826 – Northern Virginia suburbs of City of Fredericksburg, (Western) Loudon County, Spotsylvania County and Stafford County along with nearby Fauquier County
- 304 and 681 – Jefferson and Berkeley County, West Virginia

== See also ==
- List of people from the Washington, D.C. metropolitan area
- List of tallest buildings in the Washington metropolitan area
- List of U.S. metropolitan statistical areas in Virginia
- Potomac primary
- Chesapeake Colonies
- Northeast megalopolis
