= Virginia Credit Union Stadium =

Baseball venue in Fredericksburg, Virginia, U.S.

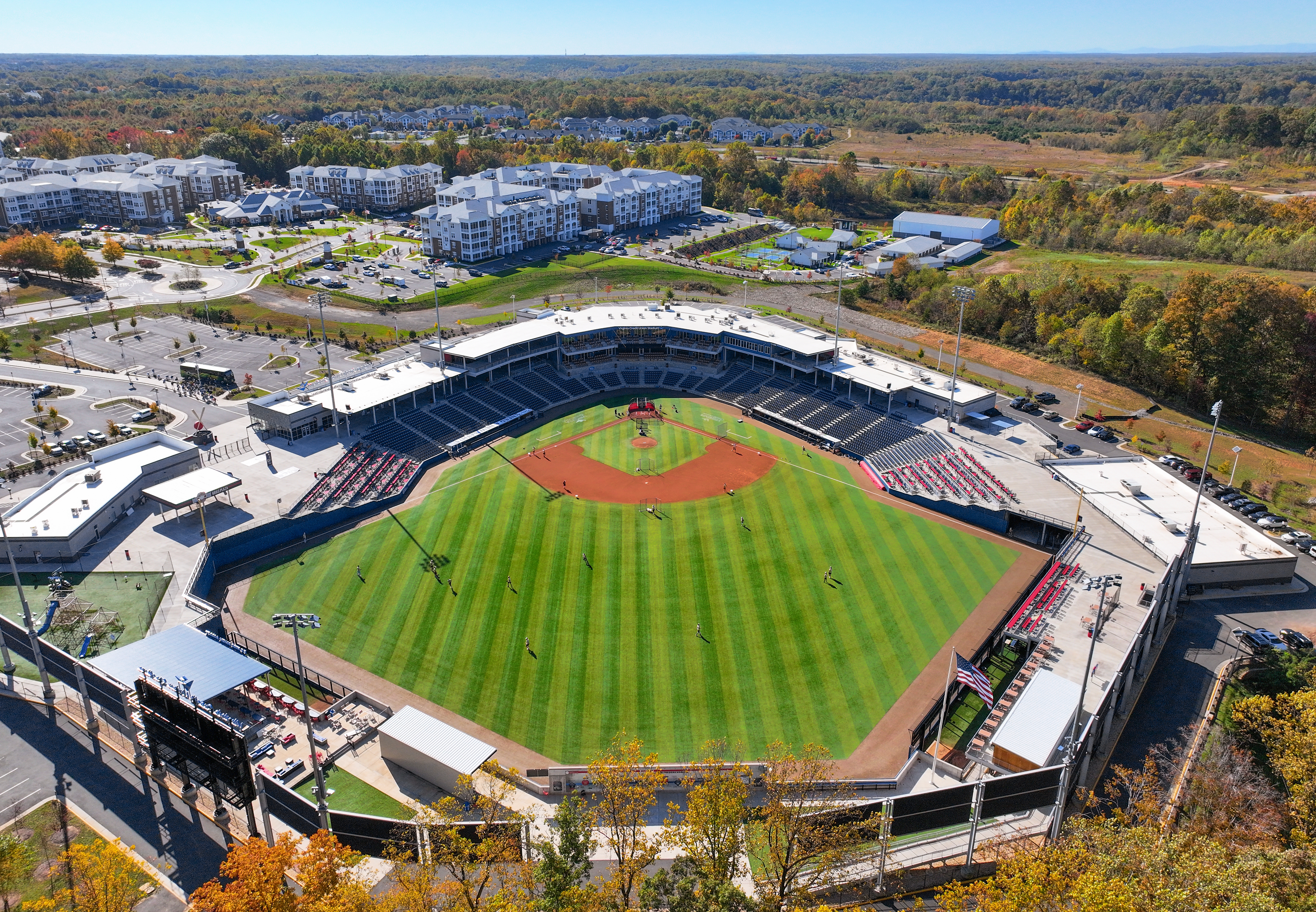
- The stadium in 2023

- Location within Virginia Location within the United States
- Interactive map of Virginia Credit Union Stadium
- Former names: New Fredericksburg Ballpark (planning); FredNats Ballpark (2021–2022)
- Address: 42 Jackie Robinson Way, Fredericksburg, Virginia 22401
- Location: Celebrate Virginia South; Fredericksburg, Virginia
- Coordinates: 38°19′05″N 77°30′35″W
- Owner: Potomac Baseball, LLC
- Operator: Potomac Baseball, LLC
- Capacity: 5,000
- Executive suites: 13
- Surface: synthetic turf
- Record attendance: 5802 (May 24, 2022, vs. Salem Red Sox)
- Field size: Left field: 326 ft (99 m); Center field: 402 ft (123 m); Right field: 327 ft (100 m)
- Public transit: Fredericksburg Regional Transit: 10

Construction
- Groundbreaking: February 24, 2019
- Built: 2019–2020
- Opened: May 11, 2021
- Cost: $35 million

Tenant
- Fredericksburg Nationals (CL) 2021–present

Website
- www.milb.com/fredericksburg/ballpark

Virginia Credit Union Stadium is a multi-purpose stadium in Fredericksburg, Virginia. The stadium has 5,000 seats, a 300-seat club facility, and 13 suites. The estimated cost of the stadium is $35 million. It is home to the Fredericksburg Nationals, a Minor League Baseball team of the Carolina League and an affiliate of the Washington Nationals, since 2021. The stadium will also host a variety of community athletic and social events. In 2020 and 2021, it served as the alternate training site for the Washington Nationals.

== History ==
=== Background ===
The Potomac Nationals, playing since 1984 at Northwest Federal Field at Pfitzner Stadium in Woodbridge, Virginia, began seeking a better ballpark at least as early as 1998, with various proposals made in 2000, 2002, 2005, 2010, 2011, and 2016.

Meanwhile, Fredericksburg worked with the Hagerstown Suns in 2013 and 2014 on plans to relocate that team for the 2015 season, but those plans fell apart.

=== Approval ===
In June 2018, Potomac Nationals owner Art Silber announced that he had signed a letter of intent to build a new stadium in Fredericksburg that would open in April 2020. In November 2018 the Fredericksburg city council unanimously gave final approval for the Silber family, doing business as Potomac Baseball, LLC, to finance, build and maintain the stadium with the city as an "anchor tenant" making an annual payment to the club of $1.05 million for 30 years. The team held a contest to rename itself and announced on October 5, 2019, that the team would be renamed the Fredericksburg Nationals.

=== Construction ===
A groundbreaking ceremony was held on February 24, 2019, but construction work had not begun as of May 20, 2019. A month later it was announced that site work would begin in July 2019. In August 2019, the Fredericksburg Economic Development and Tourism Office released a video of earth being moved at the construction site.

The Potomac Nationals played their last regular season game at Pfitzner Stadium on August 29, 2019. On September 25, 2019, general manager Nick Hall said, "We're 100 percent planning on opening April 23, [2020,]" and that the first concrete could be poured as early as the next week. MASN reported on January 13, 2020, that Hall had said that construction was on schedule; that he was confident the venue will be ready for the 2020 season; and, "The seating bowl should actually be finished by the end of next week."

With the 2020 season start postponed due to the COVID-19 pandemic, the Nationals held a virtual opening day on April 23, 2020. Hall said that the stadium was baseball-ready though construction was not yet complete, even though, with construction deemed as essential business, "The construction progress has gone off without a hitch." Construction was continuing at the start of June 2020.

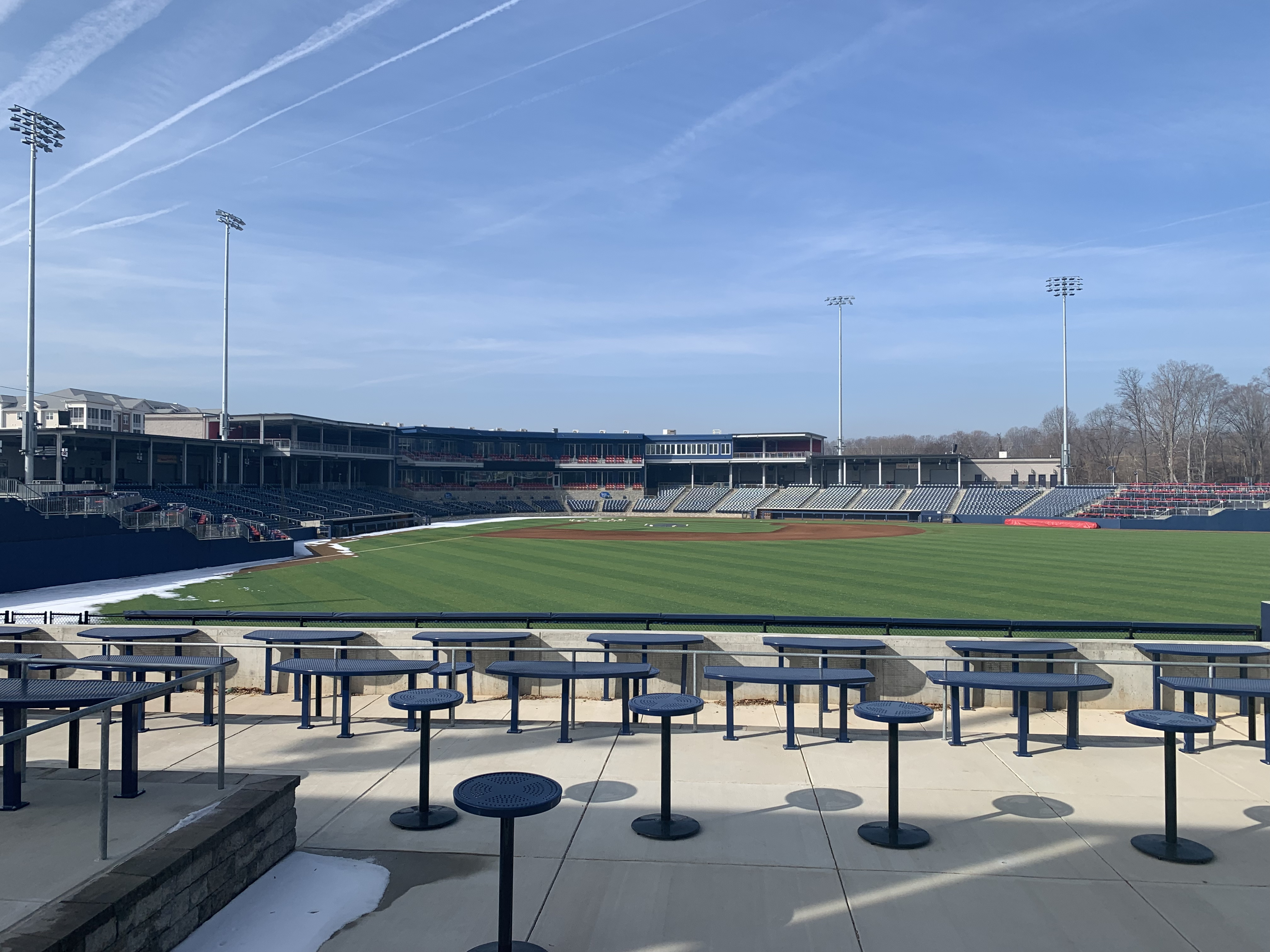
The interior of the ballpark

=== Use ===
The start of the 2020 minor league baseball season was postponed due to the COVID-19 pandemic before ultimately being cancelled on June 30. The still unnamed ballpark was used in the 2020 Major League Baseball season as the alternate training site for members of the Washington Nationals 60-man player pool who were not assigned to the 40-man roster. The Washington Nationals chose the ballpark to again serve as their alternate site to begin the 2021 season.

The Fredericksburg Nationals played their first home game on May 11, 2021, losing to the Delmarva Shorebirds, 7–5, with 2,065 people in attendance. At this time, the facility became known as FredNats Ballpark, though there was some limited earlier use of the name, such as in placing a sign on I-95 in December 2020.

The team also began hosting a series of concerts in 2021 including performances from The Beach Boys and Blue Öyster Cult.

The stadium's current baseball attendance record was set on May 24, 2022, in a 6-1 loss to the Salem Red Sox when Stephen Strasburg made a rehabilitation appearance, pitching 2.2 innings on 62 pitches.

On March 11, 2025, the stadium hosted its first ever collegiate game between the #20 Virginia Cavaliers and the Maryland Terrapins. 4,000 fans watched the Cavaliers defeats the Terrapins 7-6 in walk-off fashion.

=== Naming rights ===
On March 5, 2022, the Fredericksburg Nationals announced that they would rename the ballpark Virginia Credit Union Stadium in a 10-year naming rights deal.
