= Oceus Networks =

- Industry: 4G, Broadband
- Founded: January 2011
- Headquarters: Reston, Virginia, United States (Near Washington, District of Columbia)
- Area served: Commercial, Government, Military

Oceus Networks is a telecommunications company that provides mobile and fixed broadband network infrastructure. Oceus Networks is the approved exclusive provider of Ericsson communications technologies for certain segments of the U.S. federal government and the non-exclusive supplier to government agencies worldwide. It was founded in 2011 when Ericsson sold part of their business to a private equity firm.

== Xiphos ==
In 2011, Oceus Networks launched Xiphos, a broadband network that can be set up in remote locations. Xiphos is a scalable system, letting users deploy small systems when small teams are operating in remote environments.

On April 2, 2012 Oceus announced the availability of its new expanded fourth-generation (4G) Long Term Evolution (LTE) family of fully interoperable solutions that enable secure high-speed, high-capacity, voice, video and data transmissions. Xiphos R2 now provides: nearly unlimited coverage when used in a network of systems, support for up to ‘no practical limit’ of subscribers, up to a thousand concurrent user sessions per system.
