= Fredericksburg Regional Transit =

Bus transit in Virginia, US

- Founded: 1996
- Headquarters: 1400 Emancipation Hwy, Fredericksburg, VA 22401
- Locale: North Central Virginia
- Service area: Fredericksburg, VA; Spotsylvania County; Stafford County
- Service type: Bus
- Routes: 16
- Stops: 275
- Destinations: University of Mary Washington; Germanna Community College; Mary Washington Hospital; Veterans Administration Fredericksburg Health Care Center; Fredericksburg station
- Hubs: FXBGO! Central; Spotsylvania Towne Centre; Lee's Hill Center; Fredericksburg station; Olde Forge Plaza; Hilltop Lane; Stafford Marketplace; Stafford Courthouse
- Depots: Bowman Center
- Fleet: 30
- Director of Public Transit: Melody Fowler
- Website: www.fredericksburgva.gov/1992/Fredericksburg-Regional-Transit

Fredericksburg Regional Transit or FXBGO! is a bus transit system that operates year-round service in Fredericksburg, Virginia, Spotsylvania County, Virginia, and Stafford County, Virginia. Commuter shuttles provide service to the Fredericksburg station for connections to Amtrak and Virginia Railway Express. Most service operates Monday through Friday from 6:00 am to 8:00 pm. It also provides service late nights and on weekends when the University of Mary Washington is in session. The administrative offices and main passenger transfer facility are located at 1400 Emancipation Highway in Fredericksburg, and is commonly known as "FXBGO! Central."

== History ==
FXBGO! was founded in 1996 and has continued to grow since its inception. In 1998, the system expanded to Spotsylvania County and in 2001 it began serving Stafford County in 2002. In 2007, FXBGO! began offering feeder service to connect to the Virginia Railway Express system.

== Routes ==
Route	Information
10	Fredericksburg
11	Fredericksburg
12	Fredericksburg
13	Fredericksburg
14	Fredericksburg
15	Fredericksburg
20	South Stafford
21	South Stafford
22	North Stafford
23	North Stafford
30	Spotsylvania County
31	Spotsylvania County
32	Spotsylvania County
33	Spotsylvania County
VF1	Fredericksburg VRE Shuttle
EX	Eagle Express
