= 2006 Carolina League season =

- League: Carolina League
- Sport: Baseball
- Duration: April 6 – September 4
- Number of games: 140
- Number of teams: 8

Regular season
- Season MVP: Jordan Brown, Kinston Indians

Playoffs
- League champions: Kinston Indians
- Runners-up: Frederick Keys

CL seasons
- ← 2005 2007 →

The 2006 Carolina League was a Class A-Advanced baseball season played between April 6 and September 4. Eight teams played a 140-game schedule, with two teams from each division competing in the playoffs.

The Kinston Indians won the Carolina League championship, defeating the Frederick Keys in the final round of the playoffs.

== Teams ==
2006 Carolina League
Division	Team	City	MLB Affiliate	Stadium
North	Frederick Keys	Frederick, Maryland	Baltimore Orioles	Harry Grove Stadium
North	Lynchburg Hillcats	Lynchburg, Virginia	Pittsburgh Pirates	Calvin Falwell Field
North	Potomac Nationals	Woodbridge, Virginia	Washington Nationals	G. Richard Pfitzner Stadium
North	Wilmington Blue Rocks	Wilmington, Delaware	Boston Red Sox	Daniel S. Frawley Stadium
South	Kinston Indians	Kinston, North Carolina	Cleveland Indians	Grainger Stadium
South	Myrtle Beach Pelicans	Myrtle Beach, South Carolina	Atlanta Braves	Coastal Federal Field
South	Salem Avalanche	Salem, Virginia	Houston Astros	Lewis Gale Field
South	Winston-Salem Warthogs	Winston-Salem, North Carolina	Chicago White Sox	Ernie Shore Field

== Map of teams ==
North division South division

== Regular season ==
=== Summary ===
- The Kinston Indians finished with the best record in the league for the first time since 2004.

=== Standings ===
North division
Team	Win	Loss	%	GB
Wilmington Blue Rocks	67	71	.486	–
Potomac Nationals	64	76	.457	4
Lynchburg Hillcats	63	75	.457	4
Frederick Keys	61	77	.442	6
South division
Kinston Indians	85	54	.612	–
Salem Avalanche	76	61	.555	8
Myrtle Beach Pelicans	72	68	.514	13.5
Winston-Salem Warthogs	66	72	.478	18.5

==== First half standings ====
North division
Team	Win	Loss	%	GB
Wilmington Blue Rocks	35	35	.500	–
Lynchburg Hillcats	34	36	.486	1
Potomac Nationals	33	37	.471	2
Frederick Keys	26	43	.377	8.5
South division
Kinston Indians	47	23	.671	–
Winston-Salem Warthogs	37	32	.536	9.5
Myrtle Beach Pelicans	35	35	.500	12
Salem Avalanche	32	38	.457	15

==== Second half standings ====
North division
Team	Win	Loss	%	GB
Frederick Keys	35	34	.507	–
Wilmington Blue Rocks	32	36	.471	2.5
Potomac Nationals	31	39	.443	4.5
Lynchburg Hillcats	29	39	.426	5.5
South division
Salem Avalanche	44	23	.657	–
Kinston Indians	38	31	.551	7
Myrtle Beach Pelicans	37	33	.529	8.5
Winston-Salem Warthogs	29	40	.420	16

== League Leaders ==
=== Batting leaders ===
Stat	Player	Total
AVG	Carl Loadenthal, Myrtle Beach Pelicans	.323
H	Victor Mercedes, Winston-Salem Warthogs	142
R	Van Pope, Myrtle Beach Pelicans	78
2B	Francisco Caraballo, Salem Avalanche; Neil Sellers, Salem Avalanche	40
3B	Victor Mercedes, Winston-Salem Warthogs	8
HR	Jason Fransz, Frederick Keys	24
RBI	Jordan Brown, Kinston Indians	87
SB	Pedro Powell, Lynchburg Hillcats	63

=== Pitching leaders ===
Stat	Player	Total
W	Chuck Lofgren, Kinston Indians	17
ERA	Scott Lewis, Kinston Indians	1.48
SV	Mike James, Wilmington Blue Rocks	25
SO	Jimmy Barthmaier, Salem Avalanche	134
IP	Kevin Hart, Frederick Keys; Mike Hinckley, Potomac Nationals	148.1

== Playoffs ==
- The Kinston Indians won their fifth Carolina League championship, defeating the Frederick Keys in three games.

=== Playoff bracket ===
Semi-finals
N1	Wilmington	1
N2	Frederick	2
S1	Kinston	2
S2	Salem	0

Finals
N2	Frederick	0
S1	Kinston	3

== Awards ==
Carolina League awards
Award name	Recipient
Most Valuable Player	Jordan Brown, Kinston Indians
Pitcher of the Year	Chuck Lofgren, Kinston Indians
Manager of the Year	Jim Pankovits, Salem Avalanche

== See also ==
- 2006 Major League Baseball season
