= 2009 Carolina League season =

- League: Carolina League
- Sport: Baseball
- Duration: April 9 – September 7
- Number of games: 140
- Number of teams: 8

Regular season
- Season MVP: Brandon Waring, Frederick Keys

Playoffs
- League champions: Lynchburg Hillcats
- Runners-up: Salem Red Sox

CL seasons
- ← 2008 2010 →

The 2009 Carolina League was a Class A-Advanced baseball season played between April 9 and September 7. Eight teams played a 140-game schedule, with two teams from each division competing in the playoffs.

The Lynchburg Hillcats won the Carolina League championship, defeating the Salem Red Sox in the final round of the playoffs.

== Team changes ==
- The Salem Avalanche ended their affiliation with the Houston Astros and began a new affiliation with the Boston Red Sox. The club was renamed the Salem Red Sox.
- The Winston-Salem Warthogs are renamed the Winston-Salem Dash. The club remained affiliated with the Chicago White Sox.

== Teams ==
2009 Carolina League
Division	Team	City	MLB Affiliate	Stadium
North	Frederick Keys	Frederick, Maryland	Baltimore Orioles	Harry Grove Stadium
North	Lynchburg Hillcats	Lynchburg, Virginia	Pittsburgh Pirates	Calvin Falwell Field
North	Potomac Nationals	Woodbridge, Virginia	Washington Nationals	G. Richard Pfitzner Stadium
North	Wilmington Blue Rocks	Wilmington, Delaware	Kansas City Royals	Daniel S. Frawley Stadium
South	Kinston Indians	Kinston, North Carolina	Cleveland Indians	Grainger Stadium
South	Myrtle Beach Pelicans	Myrtle Beach, South Carolina	Atlanta Braves	BB&T Coastal Field
South	Salem Red Sox	Salem, Virginia	Boston Red Sox	Lewis Gale Field
South	Winston-Salem Dash	Winston-Salem, North Carolina	Chicago White Sox	Ernie Shore Field

== Map of teams ==
North division South division

== Regular season ==
=== Summary ===
- The Wilmington Blue Rocks finished with the best record in the league for the first time since 2003.

=== Standings ===
North division
Team	Win	Loss	%	GB
Wilmington Blue Rocks	84	55	.604	–
Potomac Nationals	79	58	.577	4
Lynchburg Hillcats	73	66	.525	11
Frederick Keys	64	75	.460	20
South division
Winston-Salem Dash	73	65	.529	–
Salem Red Sox	67	72	.482	6.5
Kinston Indians	60	78	.435	13
Myrtle Beach Pelicans	53	84	.387	19.5

==== First half standings ====
North division
Team	Win	Loss	%	GB
Lynchburg Hillcats	45	24	.652	–
Potomac Nationals	37	30	.552	7
Wilmington Blue Rocks	38	31	.551	7
Frederick Keys	31	38	.449	14
South division
Winston-Salem Dash	38	30	.559	–
Salem Red Sox	32	37	.464	6.5
Kinston Indians	27	41	.397	11
Myrtle Beach Pelicans	25	42	.373	12.5

==== Second half standings ====
North division
Team	Win	Loss	%	GB
Wilmington Blue Rocks	46	24	.657	–
Potomac Nationals	42	28	.600	4
Frederick Keys	33	37	.471	13
Lynchburg Hillcats	28	42	.400	18
South division
Salem Red Sox	35	35	.500	–
Winston-Salem Dash	35	35	.500	–
Kinston Indians	33	37	.471	2
Myrtle Beach Pelicans	28	42	.400	7

== League Leaders ==
=== Batting leaders ===
Stat	Player	Total
AVG	Robbie Widlansky, Frederick Keys	.341
H	Donell Linares, Myrtle Beach Pelicans	145
R	Danny Espinosa, Potomac Nationals	90
2B	Jordy Mercer, Lynchburg Hillcats	36
3B	Alex Presley, Lynchburg Hillcats	11
HR	Cody Johnson, Myrtle Beach Pelicans	32
RBI	Brandon Waring, Frederick Keys	90
SB	Derrick Robinson, Wilmington Blue Rocks	69

=== Pitching leaders ===
Stat	Player	Total
W	Tommy Milone, Potomac Nationals	12
ERA	Eric Berger, Kinston Indians	2.45
SV	R.J. Rodriguez, Lynchburg Hillcats	27
SO	Eammon Portice, Salem Red Sox	141
IP	Anthony Carter, Winston-Salem Dash	154.2

== Playoffs ==
- The Lynchburg Hillcats won their sixth Carolina League championship, defeating the Salem Red Sox in three games.

=== Playoff bracket ===
Semi-finals
N1	Wilmington	2
N2	Lynchburg	3
S1	Winston-Salem	0
S2	Salem	3

Finals
N2	Lynchburg	3
S2	Salem	0

== Awards ==
Carolina League awards
Award name	Recipient
Most Valuable Player	Brandon Waring, Frederick Keys
Pitcher of the Year	Zach Britton, Frederick Keys
Manager of the Year	Joe McEwing, Winston-Salem Dash

== See also ==
- 2009 Major League Baseball season
