= 2008 Carolina League season =

- League: Carolina League
- Sport: Baseball
- Duration: April 3 – September 1
- Number of games: 140
- Number of teams: 8

Regular season
- Season MVP: Beau Mills, Kinston Indians

Playoffs
- League champions: Potomac Nationals
- Runners-up: Myrtle Beach Pelicans

CL seasons
- ← 2007 2009 →

The 2008 Carolina League was a Class A-Advanced baseball season played between April 3 and September 1. Eight teams played a 140-game schedule, with two teams from each division competing in the playoffs.

The Potomac Nationals won the Carolina League championship, defeating the Myrtle Beach Pelicans in the final round of the playoffs.

== Teams ==
2008 Carolina League
Division	Team	City	MLB Affiliate	Stadium
North	Frederick Keys	Frederick, Maryland	Baltimore Orioles	Harry Grove Stadium
North	Lynchburg Hillcats	Lynchburg, Virginia	Pittsburgh Pirates	Calvin Falwell Field
North	Potomac Nationals	Woodbridge, Virginia	Washington Nationals	G. Richard Pfitzner Stadium
North	Wilmington Blue Rocks	Wilmington, Delaware	Kansas City Royals	Daniel S. Frawley Stadium
South	Kinston Indians	Kinston, North Carolina	Cleveland Indians	Grainger Stadium
South	Myrtle Beach Pelicans	Myrtle Beach, South Carolina	Atlanta Braves	BB&T Coastal Field
South	Salem Avalanche	Salem, Virginia	Houston Astros	Lewis Gale Field
South	Winston-Salem Warthogs	Winston-Salem, North Carolina	Chicago White Sox	Ernie Shore Field

== Map of teams ==
North division South division

== Regular season ==
=== Summary ===
- The Myrtle Beach Pelicans finished with the best record in the league for the first time since 2000.

=== Standings ===
North division
Team	Win	Loss	%	GB
Potomac Nationals	79	61	.564	–
Wilmington Blue Rocks	69	71	.493	10
Frederick Keys	63	76	.453	15.5
Lynchburg Hillcats	58	80	.420	20
South division
Myrtle Beach Pelicans	89	51	.636	–
Kinston Indians	72	66	.522	16
Winston-Salem Warthogs	71	68	.511	17.5
Salem Avalanche	56	84	.400	33

==== First half standings ====
North division
Team	Win	Loss	%	GB
Potomac Nationals	42	28	.600	–
Wilmington Blue Rocks	35	35	.500	7
Frederick Keys	34	36	.486	8
Lynchburg Hillcats	29	41	.414	13
South division
Myrtle Beach Pelicans	45	25	.643	–
Kinston Indians	35	34	.507	9.5
Salem Avalanche	30	40	.429	15
Winston-Salem Warthogs	29	40	.420	15.5

==== Second half standings ====
North division
Team	Win	Loss	%	GB
Potomac Nationals	37	33	.529	–
Wilmington Blue Rocks	34	36	.486	3
Lynchburg Hillcats	29	39	.426	7
Frederick Keys	29	40	.420	7.5
South division
Myrtle Beach Pelicans	44	26	.629	–
Winston-Salem Warthogs	42	28	.600	2
Kinston Indians	37	32	.536	6.5
Salem Avalanche	26	44	.371	18

== League Leaders ==
=== Batting leaders ===
Stat	Player	Total
AVG	Jim Negrych, Lynchburg Hillcats	.371
H	Mark Ori, Salem Avalanche	151
R	Ernesto Mejía, Myrtle Beach Pelicans	93
2B	Ernesto Mejía, Myrtle Beach Pelicans	47
3B	Paulo Orlando, Winston-Salem / Wilmington	14
HR	Ernesto Mejía, Myrtle Beach Pelicans; Beau Mills, Kinston Indians	21
RBI	Ernesto Mejía, Myrtle Beach Pelicans	93
SB	Derrick Robinson, Wilmington Blue Rocks	62

=== Pitching leaders ===
Stat	Player	Total
W	Scott Diamond, Myrtle Beach Pelicans; Aaron Hartsock, Wilmington Blue Rocks; Carlton Smith, Kinston Indians	12
ERA	Scott Diamond, Myrtle Beach Pelicans	2.79
SV	Tyler Chambliss, Wilmington Blue Rocks	24
SO	Brandon Erbe, Frederick Keys	151
IP	Tony Watson, Lynchburg Hillcats	151.2

== Playoffs ==
- The Potomac Nationals won their second Carolina League championship, defeating the Myrtle Beach Pelicans in four games.

=== Playoff bracket ===
Semi-finals
N1	Potomac	2
N2	Wilmington	0
S1	Myrtle Beach	2
S2	Winston-Salem	1

Finals
N1	Potomac	3
S1	Myrtle Beach	1

== Awards ==
Carolina League awards
Award name	Recipient
Most Valuable Player	Beau Mills, Kinston Indians
Pitcher of the Year	Jake Arrieta, Frederick Keys
Manager of the Year	Rocket Wheeler, Myrtle Beach Pelicans

== See also ==
- 2008 Major League Baseball season
