= 2002 Carolina League season =

- League: Carolina League
- Sport: Baseball
- Duration: April 5 – September 2
- Number of games: 140
- Number of teams: 8

Regular season
- Season MVP: Brad Hawpe, Salem Avalanche

Playoffs
- League champions: Lynchburg Hillcats
- Runners-up: Kinston Indians

CL seasons
- ← 2001 2003 →

The 2002 Carolina League was a Class A-Advanced baseball season played between April 5 and September 2. Eight teams played a 140-game schedule, with four teams competing in the playoffs.

The Lynchburg Hillcats won the Carolina League championship, defeating the Kinston Indians in the final round of the playoffs.

== Teams ==
2002 Carolina League
| Division | Team | City | MLB Affiliate | Stadium |
| North | Frederick Keys | Frederick, Maryland | Baltimore Orioles | Harry Grove Stadium |
| North | Lynchburg Hillcats | Lynchburg, Virginia | Pittsburgh Pirates | City Stadium |
| North | Potomac Cannons | Woodbridge, Virginia | St. Louis Cardinals | G. Richard Pfitzner Stadium |
| North | Wilmington Blue Rocks | Wilmington, Delaware | Kansas City Royals | Daniel S. Frawley Stadium |
| South | Kinston Indians | Kinston, North Carolina | Cleveland Indians | Grainger Stadium |
| South | Myrtle Beach Pelicans | Myrtle Beach, South Carolina | Atlanta Braves | Coastal Federal Field |
| South | Salem Avalanche | Salem, Virginia | Colorado Rockies | Salem Memorial Ballpark |
| South | Winston-Salem Warthogs | Winston-Salem, North Carolina | Chicago White Sox | Ernie Shore Field |

== Map of teams ==
North division South division

== Regular season ==
=== Summary ===
- The Wilmington Blue Rocks finished with the best record in the league for the first time since 1998.

=== Standings ===
North division
| Team | Win | Loss | % | GB |
|---|---|---|---|---|
| Wilmington Blue Rocks | 89 | 51 | .636 | – |
| Lynchburg Hillcats | 87 | 53 | .621 | 2 |
| Potomac Cannons | 59 | 81 | .421 | 30 |
| Frederick Keys | 47 | 92 | .338 | 41.5 |
South division
| Myrtle Beach Pelicans | 79 | 61 | .564 | – |
| Kinston Indians | 74 | 65 | .532 | 4.5 |
| Salem Avalanche | 74 | 66 | .529 | 5 |
| Winston-Salem Warthogs | 50 | 90 | .357 | 29 |

== League Leaders ==
=== Batting leaders ===
| Stat | Player | Total |
|---|---|---|
| AVG | Brad Hawpe, Salem Avalanche | .347 |
| H | Ray Navarrete, Lynchburg Hillcats | 169 |
| R | Cory Sullivan, Salem Avalanche | 90 |
| 2B | Cory Sullivan, Salem Avalanche | 42 |
| 3B | Jorge Piedra, Salem Avalanche | 12 |
| HR | Josh Bonifay, Lynchburg Hillcats | 26 |
| RBI | Josh Bonifay, Lynchburg Hillcats | 102 |
| SB | Ruddy Yan, Winston-Salem Warthogs | 88 |

=== Pitching leaders ===
| Stat | Player | Total |
|---|---|---|
| W | Kip Bouknight, Salem Avalanche; Danny Tamayo, Wilmington Blue Rocks | 14 |
| ERA | Ray Aguilar, Myrtle Beach Pelicans | 1.60 |
| CG | Heath Phillips, Winston-Salem Warthogs | 5 |
| SV | D.J. Carrasco, Lynchburg Hillcats | 29 |
| SO | Adam Wainwright, Myrtle Beach Pelicans | 167 |
| IP | Chris Waters, Myrtle Beach Pelicans | 182.2 |

== Playoffs ==
- The Lynchburg Hillcats won their fifth Carolina League championship, defeating the Kinston Indians in four games.

=== Playoff bracket ===
Semi-finals
N1 | Wilmington | 1
N2 | Lynchburg | 2
S1 | Myrtle Beach | 0
S2 | Kinston | 2

Finals
N2 | Lynchburg | 3
S2 | Kinston | 1

== Awards ==
Carolina League awards
| Award name | Recipient |
|---|---|
| Most Valuable Player | Brad Hawpe, Salem Avalanche |
| Pitcher of the Year | Sean Burnett, Lynchburg Hillcats |
| Manager of the Year | Jeff Garber, Wilmington Blue Rocks |

== See also ==
- 2002 Major League Baseball season
