= 2004 Carolina League season =

- League: Carolina League
- Sport: Baseball
- Duration: April 8 – September 5
- Number of games: 140
- Number of teams: 8

Regular season
- Season MVP: Brad Eldred, Lynchburg Hillcats

Playoffs
- League champions: Kinston Indians
- Runners-up: Wilmington Blue Rocks

CL seasons
- ← 2003 2005 →

The 2004 Carolina League was a Class A-Advanced baseball season played between April 8 and September 5. Eight teams played a 140-game schedule, with two teams from each division competing in the playoffs.

The Kinston Indians won the Carolina League championship, defeating the Wilmington Blue Rocks in the final round of the playoffs.

== Teams ==
2004 Carolina League
| Division | Team | City | MLB Affiliate | Stadium |
| North | Frederick Keys | Frederick, Maryland | Baltimore Orioles | Harry Grove Stadium |
| North | Lynchburg Hillcats | Lynchburg, Virginia | Pittsburgh Pirates | City Stadium |
| North | Potomac Cannons | Woodbridge, Virginia | Cincinnati Reds | G. Richard Pfitzner Stadium |
| North | Wilmington Blue Rocks | Wilmington, Delaware | Kansas City Royals | Daniel S. Frawley Stadium |
| South | Kinston Indians | Kinston, North Carolina | Cleveland Indians | Grainger Stadium |
| South | Myrtle Beach Pelicans | Myrtle Beach, South Carolina | Atlanta Braves | Coastal Federal Field |
| South | Salem Avalanche | Salem, Virginia | Houston Astros | Salem Memorial Ballpark |
| South | Winston-Salem Warthogs | Winston-Salem, North Carolina | Chicago White Sox | Ernie Shore Field |

== Map of teams ==
North division South division

== Regular season ==
=== Summary ===
- The Kinston Indians finished with the best record in the league for the first time since 2001.

=== Standings ===
North division
| Team | Win | Loss | % | GB |
|---|---|---|---|---|
| Wilmington Blue Rocks | 77 | 62 | .554 | – |
| Potomac Cannons | 67 | 72 | .482 | 10 |
| Lynchburg Hillcats | 57 | 81 | .413 | 19.5 |
| Frederick Keys | 52 | 87 | .374 | 25 |
South division
| Kinston Indians | 88 | 50 | .638 | – |
| Myrtle Beach Pelicans | 75 | 63 | .543 | 13 |
| Winston-Salem Warthogs | 74 | 66 | .529 | 15 |
| Salem Avalanche | 65 | 74 | .468 | 23.5 |

== League Leaders ==
=== Batting leaders ===
| Stat | Player | Total |
|---|---|---|
| AVG | Pat Osborn, Kinston Indians | .342 |
| H | Rajai Davis, Lynchburg Hillcats | 160 |
| R | Rajai Davis, Lynchburg Hillcats | 91 |
| 2B | Mike Avilés, Wilmington Blue Rocks | 40 |
| 3B | Gregor Blanco, Myrtle Beach Pelicans | 9 |
| HR | Darren Blakely, Winston-Salem Warthogs | 25 |
| RBI | Casey Rogowski, Winston-Salem Warthogs | 90 |
| SB | Rajai Davis, Lynchburg Hillcats | 57 |

=== Pitching leaders ===
| Stat | Player | Total |
|---|---|---|
| W | Brian Slocum, Kinston Indians | 15 |
| ERA | Zach Duke, Lynchburg Hillcats | 1.39 |
| SV | Ryan Braun, Wilmington Blue Rocks | 23 |
| SO | Thomas Pauly, Potomac Cannons | 135 |
| IP | Blaine Boyer, Myrtle Beach Pelicans | 154.0 |

== Playoffs ==
- The Kinston Indians won their fourth Carolina League championship, defeating the Wilmington Blue Rocks in five games.

=== Playoff bracket ===
Semi-finals
N1 | Wilmington | 2
N2 | Potomac | 1
S1 | Kinston | 2
S2 | Winston-Salem | 1

Finals
N1 | Wilmington | 2
S1 | Kinston | 3

== Awards ==
Carolina League awards
| Award name | Recipient |
|---|---|
| Most Valuable Player | Brad Eldred, Lynchburg Hillcats |
| Pitcher of the Year | Zack Duke, Lynchburg Hillcats |
| Manager of the Year | Torey Lovullo, Kinston Indians |

== See also ==
- 2004 Major League Baseball season
