= 2005 Carolina League season =

- League: Carolina League
- Sport: Baseball
- Duration: April 7 – September 5
- Number of games: 140
- Number of teams: 8

Regular season
- Season MVP: Leo Daigle, Winston-Salem Warthogs

Playoffs
- League champions: Frederick Keys
- Runners-up: Kinston Indians

CL seasons
- ← 2004 2006 →

The 2005 Carolina League was a Class A-Advanced baseball season played between April 7 and September 5. Eight teams played a 140-game schedule, with two teams from each division competing in the playoffs.

The Frederick Keys won the Carolina League championship, defeating the Kinston Indians in the final round of the playoffs.

== Team changes ==
- The Potomac Cannons ended their affiliation with the Cincinnati Reds and began a new affiliation with the Washington Nationals. The club was renamed the Potomac Nationals.
- The Wilmington Blue Rocks ended their affiliation with the Kansas City Royals and began a new affiliation with the Boston Red Sox.

== Teams ==
2005 Carolina League
Division	Team	City	MLB Affiliate	Stadium
North	Frederick Keys	Frederick, Maryland	Baltimore Orioles	Harry Grove Stadium
North	Lynchburg Hillcats	Lynchburg, Virginia	Pittsburgh Pirates	Calvin Falwell Field
North	Potomac Nationals	Woodbridge, Virginia	Washington Nationals	G. Richard Pfitzner Stadium
North	Wilmington Blue Rocks	Wilmington, Delaware	Boston Red Sox	Daniel S. Frawley Stadium
South	Kinston Indians	Kinston, North Carolina	Cleveland Indians	Grainger Stadium
South	Myrtle Beach Pelicans	Myrtle Beach, South Carolina	Atlanta Braves	Coastal Federal Field
South	Salem Avalanche	Salem, Virginia	Houston Astros	Salem Memorial Ballpark
South	Winston-Salem Warthogs	Winston-Salem, North Carolina	Chicago White Sox	Ernie Shore Field

== Map of teams ==
North division South division

== Regular season ==
=== Summary ===
- The Frederick Keys finished with the best record in the league for the first time since 1993.
- The Winston-Salem Warthogs defeated the Salem Avalanche in a tie-breaking game to win the South Division in the second half of the season, qualifying for the playoffs.

=== Standings ===
==== Overall standings ====
North division
Team	Win	Loss	%	GB
Frederick Keys	79	61	.564	–
Lynchburg Hillcats	78	62	.557	1
Potomac Nationals	63	77	.450	16
Wilmington Blue Rocks	60	80	.429	19
South division
Winston-Salem Warthogs	77	64	.546	–
Kinston Indians	76	64	.543	0.5
Salem Avalanche	67	74	.475	10
Myrtle Beach Pelicans	61	79	.436	15.5

==== First half standings ====
North division
Team	Win	Loss	%	GB
Lynchburg Hillcats	40	30	.571	–
Frederick Keys	35	35	.500	5
Potomac Nationals	31	39	.443	9
Wilmington Blue Rocks	31	39	.443	9
South division
Kinston Indians	41	29	.586	–
Winston-Salem Warthogs	39	31	.557	2
Myrtle Beach Pelicans	33	37	.471	8
Salem Avalanche	30	40	.429	11

==== Second half standings ====
North division
Team	Win	Loss	%	GB
Frederick Keys	44	26	.629	–
Lynchburg Hillcats	38	32	.543	6
Potomac Nationals	32	38	.457	12
Wilmington Blue Rocks	29	41	.414	15
South division
Winston-Salem Warthogs	38	33	.535	–
Salem Avalanche	37	34	.521	1
Kinston Indians	35	35	.500	2.5
Myrtle Beach Pelicans	28	42	.400	9.5

== League Leaders ==
=== Batting leaders ===
Stat	Player	Total
AVG	Leo Daigle, Winston-Salem Warthogs	.341
H	Frank Diaz, Potomac Nationals	173
R	Noah Hall, Winston-Salem Warthogs	112
2B	Frank Diaz, Potomac Nationals	45
3B	Javier Guzmán, Lynchburg Hillcats; Rob Valido, Winston-Salem Warthogs	7
HR	Tom Collaro, Winston-Salem Warthogs; Leo Daigle, Winston-Salem Warthogs	29
RBI	Leo Daigle, Winston-Salem Warthogs	112
SB	Rob Valido, Winston-Salem Warthogs	52

=== Pitching leaders ===
Stat	Player	Total
W	Ryan Rodriguez, Winston-Salem Warthogs	13
ERA	Chance Douglass, Salem Avalanche	2.90
SV	Ehren Wassermann, Winston-Salem Warthogs	20
SO	Jim Johnson, Frederick Keys	168
IP	Chance Douglass, Salem Avalanche; Michael O'Connor, Potomac Nationals	167.2

== Playoffs ==
- The Frederick Keys won their second Carolina League championship, defeating the Kinston Indians in five games.

=== Playoff bracket ===
Semi-finals
N1	Frederick	2
N2	Lynchburg	0
S1	Winston-Salem	0
S2	Kinston	2

Finals
N1	Frederick	3
S2	Kinston	2

== Awards ==
Carolina League awards
Award name	Recipient
Most Valuable Player	Leo Daigle, Winston-Salem Warthogs
Pitcher of the Year	Jim Johnson, Frederick Keys
Manager of the Year	Iván DeJesús, Salem Avalanche

== See also ==
- 2005 Major League Baseball season
