= 2007 Carolina League season =

- League: Carolina League
- Sport: Baseball
- Duration: April 5 – September 3
- Games: 140
- Teams: 8

Regular season
- Season MVP: Mitch Einertson, Salem Avalanche

Playoffs
- League champions: Frederick Keys
- Runners-up: Salem Avalanche

CL seasons
- ← 2006 2008 →

The 2007 Carolina League was a Class A-Advanced baseball season played between April 5 and September 3. Eight teams played a 140-game schedule, with two teams from each division competing in the playoffs.

The Frederick Keys won the Carolina League championship, defeating the Salem Avalanche in the final round of the playoffs.

== Team changes ==
- The Wilmington Blue Rocks ended their affiliation with the Boston Red Sox and began a new affiliation with the Kansas City Royals.

== Teams ==
2007 Carolina League
| Division | Team | City | MLB Affiliate | Stadium |
| North | Frederick Keys | Frederick, Maryland | Baltimore Orioles | Harry Grove Stadium |
| North | Lynchburg Hillcats | Lynchburg, Virginia | Pittsburgh Pirates | Calvin Falwell Field |
| North | Potomac Nationals | Woodbridge, Virginia | Washington Nationals | G. Richard Pfitzner Stadium |
| North | Wilmington Blue Rocks | Wilmington, Delaware | Kansas City Royals | Daniel S. Frawley Stadium |
| South | Kinston Indians | Kinston, North Carolina | Cleveland Indians | Grainger Stadium |
| South | Myrtle Beach Pelicans | Myrtle Beach, South Carolina | Atlanta Braves | BB&T Coastal Field |
| South | Salem Avalanche | Salem, Virginia | Houston Astros | Lewis Gale Field |
| South | Winston-Salem Warthogs | Winston-Salem, North Carolina | Chicago White Sox | Ernie Shore Field |

== Map of teams ==
North division South division

== Regular season ==
=== Summary ===
- The Kinston Indians finished with the best record in the league for the second consecutive season.

=== Standings ===
North division
| Team | Win | Loss | % | GB |
|---|---|---|---|---|
| Wilmington Blue Rocks | 75 | 62 | .547 | – |
| Potomac Nationals | 69 | 68 | .504 | 6 |
| Frederick Keys | 64 | 74 | .464 | 11.5 |
| Lynchburg Hillcats | 55 | 82 | .401 | 20 |
South division
| Kinston Indians | 87 | 52 | .626 | – |
| Salem Avalanche | 79 | 60 | .568 | 8 |
| Winston-Salem Warthogs | 64 | 74 | .464 | 22.5 |
| Myrtle Beach Pelicans | 59 | 80 | .424 | 28 |

==== First half standings ====
North division
| Team | Win | Loss | % | GB |
|---|---|---|---|---|
| Frederick Keys | 32 | 37 | .464 | – |
| Wilmington Blue Rocks | 30 | 38 | .441 | 1.5 |
| Lynchburg Hillcats | 29 | 38 | .433 | 2 |
| Potomac Nationals | 29 | 39 | .426 | 2.5 |
South division
| Kinston Indians | 45 | 24 | .652 | – |
| Salem Avalanche | 41 | 28 | .594 | 4 |
| Winston-Salem Warthogs | 38 | 31 | .551 | 7 |
| Myrtle Beach Pelicans | 30 | 39 | .435 | 15 |

==== Second half standings ====
North division
| Team | Win | Loss | % | GB |
|---|---|---|---|---|
| Wilmington Blue Rocks | 45 | 24 | .652 | – |
| Potomac Nationals | 40 | 29 | .580 | 5 |
| Frederick Keys | 32 | 37 | .464 | 13 |
| Lynchburg Hillcats | 26 | 44 | .371 | 19.5 |
South division
| Kinston Indians | 42 | 28 | .600 | – |
| Salem Avalanche | 38 | 32 | .543 | 4 |
| Myrtle Beach Pelicans | 29 | 41 | .414 | 13 |
| Winston-Salem Warthogs | 26 | 43 | .377 | 15.5 |

== League leaders ==
=== Batting leaders ===
| Stat | Player | Total |
|---|---|---|
| AVG | Mitch Einertson, Salem Avalanche | .305 |
| H | José Duarte, Wilmington Blue Rocks | 143 |
| R | Josh Rodriguez, Kinston Indians | 84 |
| 2B | Mitch Einertson, Salem Avalanche | 40 |
| 3B | Quentin Davis, Myrtle Beach Pelicans | 11 |
| HR | Micah Schnurstein, Winston-Salem Warthogs | 25 |
| RBI | Brad Corley, Lynchburg Hillcats | 89 |
| SB | Pedro Powell, Lynchburg Hillcats | 67 |

=== Pitching leaders ===
| Stat | Player | Total |
|---|---|---|
| W | Rowdy Hardy, Wilmington Blue Rocks | 15 |
| ERA | Brad James, Salem Avalanche | 1.98 |
| SV | Scott Roehl, Kinston Indians | 24 |
| SO | David Hernandez, Frederick Keys | 168 |
| IP | Rowdy Hardy, Wilmington Blue Rocks | 167.0 |

== Playoffs ==
- The Frederick Keys won their third Carolina League championship, defeating the Salem Avalanche in four games.

=== Playoff bracket ===
Semi-finals
N1 | Wilmington | 0
N2 | Frederick | 2
S1 | Kinston | 1
S2 | Salem | 2

Finals
N2 | Frederick | 3
S2 | Salem | 1

== Awards ==
Carolina League awards
| Award name | Recipient |
|---|---|
| Most Valuable Player | Mitch Einertson, Salem Avalanche |
| Pitcher of the Year | Rowdy Harty, Wilmington Blue Rocks |
| Manager of the Year | Mike Sarbaugh, Kinston Indians |

== See also ==
- 2007 Major League Baseball season
