= 2003 Carolina League season =

- League: Carolina League
- Sport: Baseball
- Duration: April 4 – September 1
- Number of games: 140
- Number of teams: 8

Regular season
- Season MVP: Chris Shelton, Lynchburg Hillcats

Playoffs
- League champions: Winston-Salem Warthogs
- Runners-up: Lynchburg Hillcats

CL seasons
- ← 2002 2004 →

The 2003 Carolina League was a Class A-Advanced baseball season played between April 4 and September 1. Eight teams played a 140-game schedule, with two teams from each division competing in the playoffs.

The Winston-Salem Warthogs won the Carolina League championship, defeating the Lynchburg Hillcats in the final round of the playoffs.

== Team changes ==
- The Potomac Cannons ended their affiliation with the St. Louis Cardinals and began a new affiliation with the Cincinnati Reds.
- The Salem Avalanche ended their affiliation with the Colorado Rockies and began a new affiliation with the Houston Astros.

== Teams ==
2003 Carolina League
Division	Team	City	MLB Affiliate	Stadium
North	Frederick Keys	Frederick, Maryland	Baltimore Orioles	Harry Grove Stadium
North	Lynchburg Hillcats	Lynchburg, Virginia	Pittsburgh Pirates	City Stadium
North	Potomac Cannons	Woodbridge, Virginia	Cincinnati Reds	G. Richard Pfitzner Stadium
North	Wilmington Blue Rocks	Wilmington, Delaware	Kansas City Royals	Daniel S. Frawley Stadium
South	Kinston Indians	Kinston, North Carolina	Cleveland Indians	Grainger Stadium
South	Myrtle Beach Pelicans	Myrtle Beach, South Carolina	Atlanta Braves	Coastal Federal Field
South	Salem Avalanche	Salem, Virginia	Houston Astros	Salem Memorial Ballpark
South	Winston-Salem Warthogs	Winston-Salem, North Carolina	Chicago White Sox	Ernie Shore Field

== Map of teams ==
North division South division

== Regular season ==
=== Summary ===
- The Wilmington Blue Rocks finished with the best record in the league for the second consecutive season.
- Despite finishing with the best record in the South division, the Salem Avalanche failed to qualify for the post-season, as they did not win the division in either half of the season.

=== Standings ===
North division
Team	Win	Loss	%	GB
Wilmington Blue Rocks	80	60	.571	–
Lynchburg Hillcats	76	59	.563	1.5
Potomac Cannons	62	77	.446	17.5
Frederick Keys	60	75	.444	17.5
South division
Salem Avalanche	73	65	.529	–
Kinston Indians	73	66	.525	0.5
Winston-Salem Warthogs	71	67	.514	2
Myrtle Beach Pelicans	56	82	.406	17

== League Leaders ==
=== Batting leaders ===
Stat	Player	Total
AVG	Chris Shelton, Lynchburg Hillcats	.359
H	William Bergolla, Potomac Cannons	142
R	Nate McLouth, Lynchburg Hillcats; Ruddy Yan, Winston-Salem Warthogs	85
2B	Ryan Doumit, Lynchburg Hillcats	38
3B	Mike Rodriguez, Salem Avalanche	8
HR	Chris Shelton, Lynchburg Hillcats	21
RBI	Walter Young, Lynchburg Hillcats	87
SB	Ruddy Yan, Winston-Salem Warthogs	76

=== Pitching leaders ===
Stat	Player	Total
W	Jared Gothreaux, Salem Avalanche	13
ERA	Kyle Middleton, Wilmington Blue Rocks	2.41
CG	Kris Honel, Winston-Salem Warthogs; Zack Greinke, Wilmington Blue Rocks	3
SV	Lee Gronkiewicz, Kinston Indians	37
SO	Macay McBride, Myrtle Beach Pelicans	139
IP	Macay McBride, Myrtle Beach Pelicans	164.2

== Playoffs ==
- The Winston-Salem Warthogs won their tenth Carolina League championship, defeating the Lynchburg Hillcats in three games.

=== Playoff bracket ===
Semi-finals
N1	Wilmington	0
N2	Lynchburg	2
S1	Kinston	0
S2	Winston-Salem	2

Finals
N2	Lynchburg	0
S2	Winston-Salem	3

== Awards ==
Carolina League awards
Award name	Recipient
Most Valuable Player	Chris Shelton, Lynchburg Hillcats
Pitcher of the Year	Zack Greinke, Wilmington Blue Rocks
Manager of the Year	Dave Clark, Lynchburg Hillcats

== See also ==
- 2003 Major League Baseball season
