= 2001 Carolina League season =

- League: Carolina League
- Sport: Baseball
- Duration: April 6 – September 1
- Number of games: 140
- Number of teams: 8

Regular season
- Season MVP: Víctor Martínez, Kinston Indians

Playoffs
- League champions: Salem Avalanche
- Runners-up: Wilmington Blue Rocks

CL seasons
- ← 2000 2002 →

The 2001 Carolina League was a Class A-Advanced baseball season played between April 6 and September 1. Eight teams played a 140-game schedule, with the winners of each half of the season competing in the playoffs.

The Salem Avalanche won the Carolina League championship, defeating the Wilmington Blue Rocks in the final round of the playoffs.

== Teams ==
2001 Carolina League
Division	Team	City	MLB Affiliate	Stadium
North	Frederick Keys	Frederick, Maryland	Baltimore Orioles	Harry Grove Stadium
North	Lynchburg Hillcats	Lynchburg, Virginia	Pittsburgh Pirates	City Stadium
North	Potomac Cannons	Woodbridge, Virginia	St. Louis Cardinals	G. Richard Pfitzner Stadium
North	Wilmington Blue Rocks	Wilmington, Delaware	Kansas City Royals	Daniel S. Frawley Stadium
South	Kinston Indians	Kinston, North Carolina	Cleveland Indians	Grainger Stadium
South	Myrtle Beach Pelicans	Myrtle Beach, South Carolina	Atlanta Braves	Coastal Federal Field
South	Salem Avalanche	Salem, Virginia	Colorado Rockies	Salem Memorial Ballpark
South	Winston-Salem Warthogs	Winston-Salem, North Carolina	Chicago White Sox	Ernie Shore Field

== Map of teams ==
North division South division

== Regular season ==
=== Summary ===
- The Kinston Indians finished with the best record in the league for the first time since 1999.

=== Standings ===
North division
Team	Win	Loss	%	GB
Wilmington Blue Rocks	78	62	.557	–
Frederick Keys	70	69	.504	7.5
Potomac Cannons	66	74	.471	12
Lynchburg Hillcats	58	79	.423	18.5
South division
Kinston Indians	89	51	.636	–
Myrtle Beach Pelicans	71	67	.514	17
Salem Avalanche	70	68	.507	18
Winston-Salem Warthogs	54	86	.386	35

== League Leaders ==
=== Batting leaders ===
Stat	Player	Total
AVG	Víctor Martínez, Kinston Indians	.329
H	Coco Crisp, Potomac Cannons	162
R	Marco Cunningham, Wilmington Blue Rocks	82
2B	Garrett Atkins, Salem Avalanche	43
3B	José Castillo, Lynchburg Hillcats; Javier Colina, Salem Avalanche	7
HR	Doug Gredvig, Frederick Keys	20
RBI	Troy Cameron, Kinston / Myrtle Beach	76
SB	Chad Durham, Winston-Salem Warthogs	50

=== Pitching leaders ===
Stat	Player	Total
W	Trey Hodges, Myrtle Beach Pelicans	15
ERA	Blake Williams, Potomac Cannons	2.43
CG	Dennis Ulacia, Winston-Salem Warthogs	4
SV	Brian Jackson, Kinston Indians	25
SO	Brian Tallet, Kinston Indians	164
IP	Trey Hodges, Myrtle Beach Pelicans	173.0

== Playoffs ==
- The Salem Avalanche won their fourth Carolina League championship, defeating the Wilmington Blue Rocks in five games.

=== Playoff bracket ===
Semi-finals
N1	Wilmington	2
N2	Frederick	0
S1	Kinston	1
S2	Salem	2

Finals
N1	Wilmington	2
S2	Salem	3

== Awards ==
Carolina League awards
Award name	Recipient
Most Valuable Player	Víctor Martínez, Kinston Indians
Pitcher of the Year	Trey Hodges, Myrtle Beach Pelicans; Jimmy Journell, Potomac Cannons
Manager of the Year	Brad Komminsk, Kinston Indians

== See also ==
- 2001 Major League Baseball season
