= Carl Long (baseball) =

American baseball player

- Outfielder
- Born: May 9, 1935; Rock Hill, South Carolina, U.S.
- Died: January 12, 2015 (aged 79); Kinston, North Carolina, U.S.
- Batted: Both Threw: Right

debut
- 1952, for the Birmingham Black Barons

Last appearance
- 1957, for the Mexico City Tigers

Minor League statistics
- Plate appearances: 1648
- Batting average: .275
- Home runs: 57
- Stats at Baseball Reference

Teams
- Birmingham Black Barons (1952–1953); Philadelphia Stars (1953); St. Jean Canadians (1954); Billings Mustangs (1955); Phoenix Stars (1955); Kinston Eagles (1956); Beaumont Pirates (1957); Mexico City Tigers (1957)

Career highlights and awards
- East-West All-Star (1953); Carolina League All-Star (1956); 1952 Negro American League Triples Leader; 1956 Carolina League RBI Leader

Carl Russell Long (May 9, 1935 – January 12, 2015) was an American professional baseball outfielder who played in Negro league baseball and minor league baseball. Along with Frank Washington, Long broke the color barrier in the Carolina League city of Kinston, North Carolina.

== Career ==
Long's professional debut came with the Birmingham Black Barons of the Negro American League in 1952, and that year, he led the NAL in triples with 8. He stayed with Birmingham through the 1953 season, and in that year, was selected to the Negro League East-West All-Star Game. He started for the East team as its third baseman going hitless with four plate appearances in the All-Star game.

In 1954, he was signed by the Pittsburgh Pirates and was sent to their minor league team, the St. Jean Canadians of the Provincial League, in the Province of Quebec in Canada. During 1955, Long played for the Billings Mustangs in the Pioneer League and also saw some action for Phoenix in the Arizona–Mexico League.

Long made his debut for the Kinston Eagles on April 17, 1956. During the year, he hit .291 with 18 home runs and 111 runs batted in. The Carolina League itself had been integrated in 1951 by Percy Miller Jr. of the Danville Leafs. The 111 RBI tallied by Long in 1956 has been equaled over time but has never been surpassed by any subsequent Kinston players.

After playing with the Kinston Eagles in 1956, Long next played for the Beaumont Pirates of the Big State League and in the Mexican League, with the Mexico City Tigers, in 1957. A shoulder injury then curtailed his active playing career at which he left baseball to live in Kinston.

== Later life ==
Long continued to break barriers after his baseball career was over, becoming Kinston's first black bus driver as well as Lenoir County's first black Deputy Sheriff and black detective within the sheriff's department.

Long often attended games at Grainger Stadium to watch Kinston's current team, the Kinston Indians. He was honored by the Indians with "Carl Long Day" games, and in 2003 he was inducted into the Kinston Professional Baseball Hall of Fame. He has traveled extensively to promote the Negro Leagues Baseball Museum.

Carl Long died on January 12, 2015, at the age of 79, after being hospitalized from a series of minor strokes he suffered in November 2014.
