= Rafael Bautista (baseball) =

Dominican baseball player (born 1993)

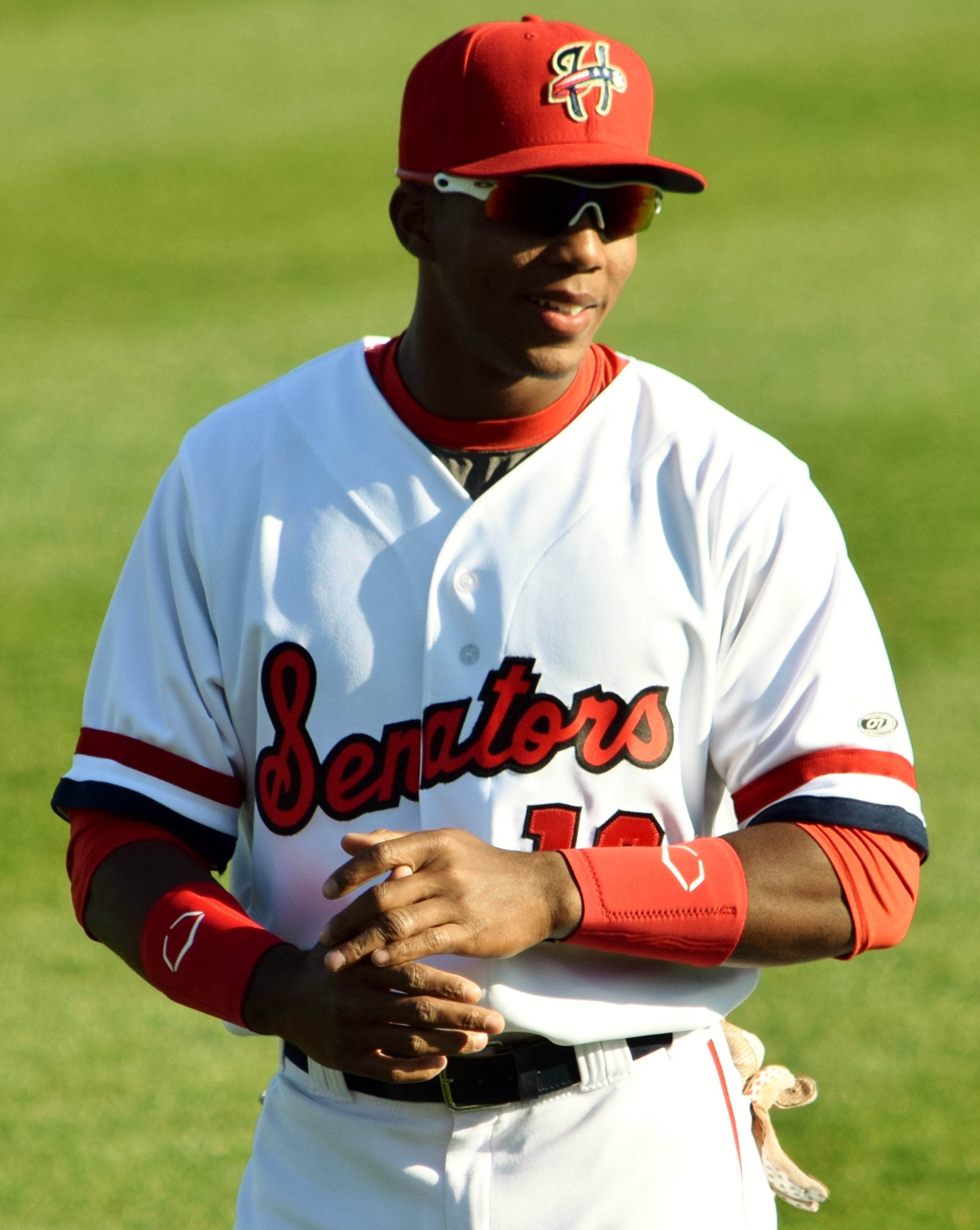
- Bautista with the Harrisburg Senators in 2016
- Outfielder
- Born: March 8, 1993 (age 32); Santo Domingo, Dominican Republic
- Batted: Right Threw: Right

MLB debut
- April 30, 2017, for the Washington Nationals

Last MLB appearance
- May 6, 2018, for the Washington Nationals

MLB statistics
- Batting average: .129
- Home runs: 0
- Runs batted in: 0
- Stats at Baseball Reference

Teams
- Washington Nationals (2017–2018)

Rafael Darwing Bautista Rodriguez (born March 8, 1993) is a Dominican former professional baseball outfielder. He played in Major League Baseball (MLB) for the Washington Nationals.

== Professional career ==
=== Washington Nationals ===
Bautista signed with the Washington Nationals as an international free agent on January 9, 2012. He began his professional career in 2012 with the rookie–level Dominican Summer League Nationals in the Dominican Summer League, where he batted .329 with 25 runs batted in (RBI) and 47 stolen bases. In 2013 he played in the rookie–level Gulf Coast League for the Gulf Coast League Nationals, who that year finished their regular season with a record of 49–9, giving them the highest winning percentage (.845) for a full regular season ever achieved by a minor-league baseball team based in the United States. The team then won all three of its playoff games, defeating the Gulf Coast League Pirates in a single-game semifinal playoff and sweeping the Gulf Coast League Red Sox in the best–of–three league championship series, to become the 2013 Gulf Coast League champions. Bautista appeared in 52 games during the championship season, batting .322 with one home run, 27 RBIs, and 26 stolen bases.

Bautista spent 2014 with the Single–A Hagerstown Suns in the South Atlantic League, hitting .290 with five home runs, 54 RBIs, and 69 stolen bases. He split 2015 between the High–A Potomac Nationals in the Carolina League, the Low–A Auburn Doubledays in the New York-Penn League, and the Gulf Coast League Nationals, batting a combined .275 for the year with a home run, 14 RBI, and 26 stolen bases, and over the 2015–2016 offseason played in the Dominican Winter League with Leones del Escogido. Bautista advanced to the Double–A Harrisburg Senators in the Eastern League for the 2016 season, hitting .282 with four home runs, 39 RBI, and 56 stolen bases. On November 18, 2016, the Nationals added Bautista to their 40-man roster to protect him from the Rule 5 draft. He again played winter ball with Leones del Escogido during the 2016–2017 offseason.

Bautista began the 2017 season with the Triple–A Syracuse Chiefs in the International League. The Washington Nationals promoted him to the major leagues for the first time on April 29, 2017. He made his major league debut on April 30 in a 23–5 Nationals victory over the New York Mets at Nationals Park in Washington, D.C., batting twice and going 0-for-2 against Mets catcher Kevin Plawecki, who was making his first–ever major league appearance as a pitcher. On May 6, in a 6–2 Nationals victory over the Philadelphia Phillies at Citizens Bank Park in Philadelphia, he made his first career major–league start, playing right field, and got his first career major–league hit, a single through the infield off Phillies pitcher Vince Velasquez. The Nationals optioned Bautista back to Syracuse on May 8.

The Nationals recalled Bautista on August 27, but optioned him back to Syracuse the next day. They called him back up again on September 7, and he finished the regular season with the Nationals. He completed the season having played in 17 major–league games, batting .160 with four hits – all singles – in 25 at–bats, scoring two runs, and with a slugging percentage of .160 and an on-base percentage of .222. In the minor leagues, Bautista played 43 games for Syracuse and 13 for the GCL Nationals during 2017. He hit a combined .259 for the two teams, with 14 RBI and nine stolen bases.

Bautista participated in 2018 major–league spring training before the Nationals optioned him to the Triple–A Syracuse Chiefs on March 14. He was reassigned to the Double–A Harrisburg Senators on April 2 and began the season with them, but was promoted back to Syracuse on April 12. He had made 45 plate appearances for Syracuse, batting .429 with a .966 on-base-plus-slugging percentage (OPS) when, on April 24, the Nationals called him up to the major leagues. He appeared in nine games, usually as a late–game replacement or a pinch–runner, made one start, and went 0–for–6, striking out once and scoring a run before the Nationals optioned him back to Syracuse on May 7 to make room on their 25–man roster when they activated right–handed relief pitcher Shawn Kelley from the 10–day disabled list. Bautista made another 46 plate appearances for Syracuse, batting .300 with a .749 OPS, before colliding with another player during a game against the Rochester Red Wings at Rochester, New York, on May 17, tearing the anterior cruciate ligament, lateral collateral ligament, and meniscus in his left knee. The injury required season-ending surgery. He ended his season with an overall .303 batting average in the minor leagues, with three doubles, a triple, a home run, seven RBI, and six stolen bases for the year. On June 9, the Nationals released Bautista to make room for Adam Eaton on their roster when they activated Eaton from the 60–day disabled list. On June 13, Washington re–signed Bautista to a minor league contract.

In 2019, Bautista played for Double–A Harrisburg, Single–A Hagerstown, and Low–A Auburn, slashing .182/.256/.255 with two home runs and nine RBI across 29 games between the three affiliates. Bautista did not play in a game in 2020 due to the cancellation of the minor league season because of the COVID-19 pandemic. On November 2, 2020, he elected free agency.

On November 12, 2020, Bautista re–signed with the Nationals on a minor league contract. Bautista was assigned to the Triple–A Rochester Red Wings to begin the 2021 season. He elected free agency on November 7, 2021.
