= Kinston Eagles =

Kinston Eagles may refer to:

- Kinston Eagles (Virginia League), a minor league baseball team of the Virginia League that was active in from 1925 to 1927
- Kinston Eagles (Eastern Carolina League), a minor league baseball team of the Eastern Carolina League that was active in 1928 and 1929
- Kinston Eagles (Coastal Plain League), a minor league baseball team of the Coastal Plain League that was active from 1937 to 1952
- Kinston Eagles (1956–1957), a Pittsburgh Pirates and Washington Senators affiliated baseball team in the Carolina League who became the Wilson Tobs
- Kinston Eagles (1962–1973), a Pittsburgh Pirates, Atlanta Braves, & New York Yankees affiliated baseball team in the Carolina League who became the Kinston Expos
- Kinston Eagles (1978–1982), a Toronto Blue Jays affiliated baseball team in the Carolina League that became the Kinston Blue Jays
- Kinston Eagles (1986), an unaffiliated Carolina League baseball team who became the Kinston Indians
