= Francisco Caraballo =

Venezuelan baseball player

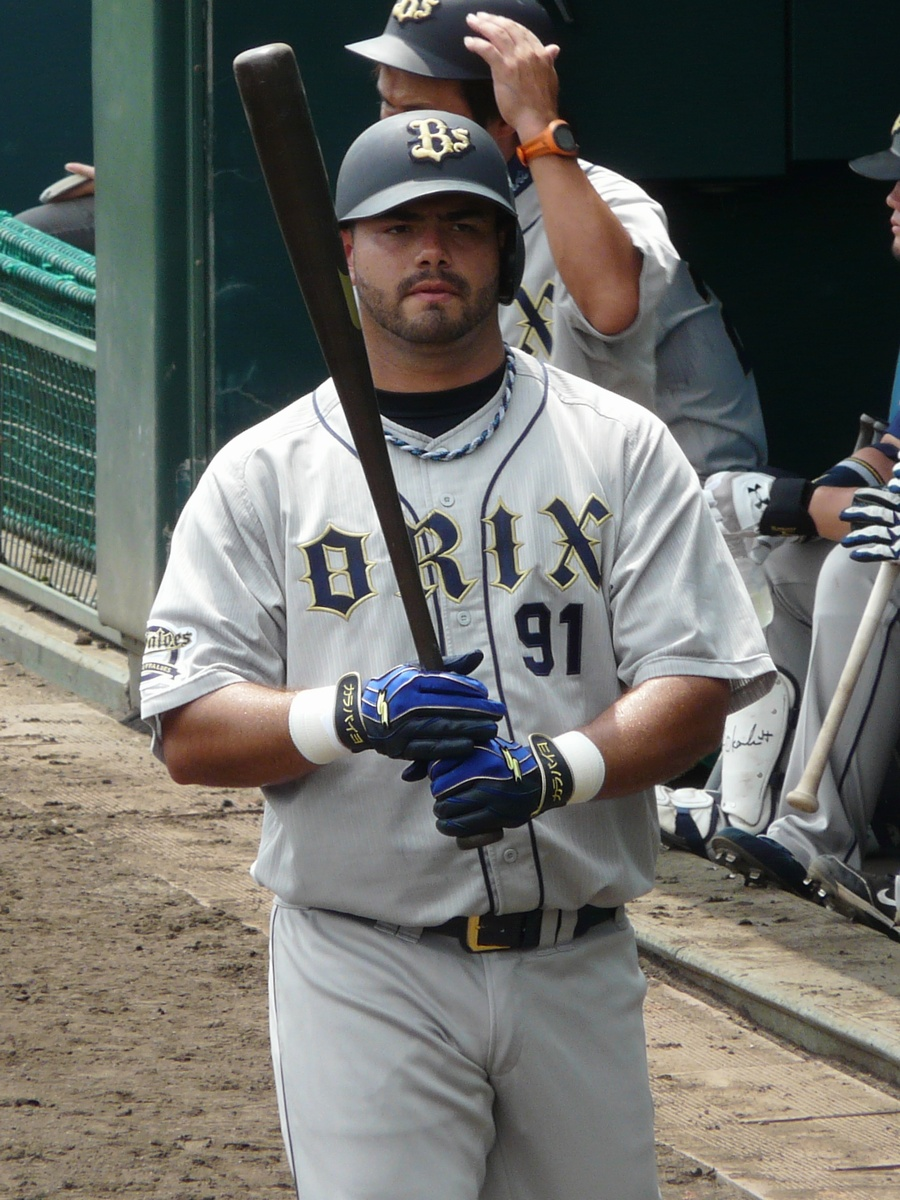
- First baseman
- Born: October 21, 1983 (age 42); Anaco, Venezuela
- Batted: Right Threw: Right

NPB debut
- July 9, 2010, for the Orix Buffaloes

Last appearance
- August 13, 2015, for the Orix Buffaloes
- Stats at Baseball Reference

Teams
- Orix Buffaloes (2010–2011, 2015)

Francisco Daniel Caraballo (born October 21, 1983) is a Venezuelan former professional baseball first baseman. He played for the Orix Buffaloes of Nippon Professional Baseball (NPB).

== Career ==
Caraballo signed with the Houston Astros of Major League Baseball as an amateur free agent. He spent seven years in Minor League Baseball in the Astros' organization. He was promoted to the Class AA Texas League, but did not appear in MLB for the Astros, who released Caraballo during spring training in 2008. Caraballo signed with the Worcester Tornadoes of the Canadian-American Association, an independent baseball league, for the 2008 season.

Caraballo played in the Kyushu Island League, an independent league in Japan, in 2009. He made his NPB debut with Orix in 2010, registering a .242 batting average and seven home runs in 124 at bats across 40 games played. He was limited by injuries in 2011, and was released by Orix. Caraballo played in the Canadian-American Association in 2012. He returned to Japan in 2013, playing for the Gunma Diamond Pegasus of the Baseball Challenge League (BCL), and led the league with 24 home runs and 63 runs batted in (RBIs). He won the BCL Triple Crown in 2014, as he led the league in batting average (.396), home runs (33), and RBIs (87). His 33 home runs and 87 RBIs set BCL single-season records. In 2015, he returned to Orix after a tryout.
