= Chris Shelton (baseball) =

American baseball player (born 1980)

- Shelton with the Toledo Mudhens
- First baseman
- Born: June 26, 1980 (age 46); Salt Lake City, Utah, U.S.
- Batted: Right Threw: Right

MLB debut
- April 15, 2004, for the Detroit Tigers

Last MLB appearance
- July 30, 2009, for the Seattle Mariners

MLB statistics
- Batting average: .273
- Home run: 37
- Runs batted in: 124
- Stats at Baseball Reference

Teams
- Detroit Tigers (2004–2006); Texas Rangers (2008); Seattle Mariners (2009)

Christopher Bob Shelton (born June 26, 1980) is an American former professional baseball first baseman. He played in Major League Baseball (MLB) for the Detroit Tigers, Texas Rangers, and Seattle Mariners over his five-year major league career.

== Amateur career ==
Shelton played baseball at Cottonwood High School, Salt Lake Community College, and the University of Utah. While playing with Utah, Shelton was named to the Mountain West Conference All-Tournament Team as a junior.

== Professional career ==
=== Detroit Tigers ===
Shelton was drafted by the Pittsburgh Pirates in the 33rd round of the 2001 MLB draft, though he never made the team's 40-man roster. The Detroit Tigers selected him in the 2003 Rule 5 draft. In 2004, he played sparingly as the Tigers had to keep him on their major league roster because of the Rule 5 requirements. He only batted 57 times.

While in Detroit, due to his red hair and prodigious batting, he had earned various nicknames, such as "Red Pop" (a reference to the Detroit-made Faygo beverage) from fans. Tigers broadcasters Rod Allen and Mario Impemba often called him "Big Red" or "Orange Crush."

On April 15, Shelton made his major league debut with the Tigers as a pinch hitter against the Toronto Blue Jays. He went hitless in two at-bats as Roy Halladay pitched a complete game shutout against the Tigers.

In 2006, Shelton hit nine home runs in the first 13 games of the season; this made him the fastest player in American League (AL) history to reach that mark at that point in a season. He also became the fourth player in baseball history to hit at least nine home runs in his team's first 13 games, trailing only Mike Schmidt in 1976, Larry Walker in 1997, and Luis Gonzalez in 2001. Shelton earned the AL Player of the Week Award for the week of April 3. Shelton's power dropped significantly after April, however, and on July 31, he was optioned to Triple-A Toledo to make room for Sean Casey, whom the Tigers had acquired from Pittsburgh in a trade-deadline deal. On September 1, Shelton was recalled to Detroit as an emergency catcher for Iván Rodríguez.

During 2007 spring training, Shelton lost out on a roster spot competition with Marcus Thames and spent the season in Triple-A.

=== Texas Rangers ===
On December 5, 2007, Shelton was traded to the Texas Rangers for Freddy Guzmán. On January 14, 2008, Texas designated Shelton for assignment in order to make room for Kazuo Fukumori, a veteran reliever from Japan. Shelton's contract was then purchased by the Rangers on April 29, from the Triple-A Oklahoma RedHawks, when Jason Botts was designated for assignment. On June 26, the strikeout prone Shelton was designated for assignment to make way for Chris Davis. Shelton again cleared waivers and was reassigned once more to the RedHawks. He became a free agent at the end of the season.

=== Seattle Mariners ===
On December 8, 2008, Shelton signed a minor league contract with the Seattle Mariners. He batted .460 during spring training in 2009, second on the team among players with at least 30 at-bats but did not break camp with the major-league club. On July 10, the Seattle Mariners called up Shelton to add more pop on the bench, and he came through with the game-winning run in a Mariners victory two days later. Shelton was designated for assignment by the Mariners on August 1. His contract was then purchased on August 5, from the Triple-A Tacoma Rainiers. He was granted free agency on October 15.

=== Later career ===
Shelton signed a minor league contract on December 8, 2009, with the Houston Astros.

Shelton became a free agent after the 2010 season. On February 20, 2011, he signed a minor league contract with the New York Mets for the 2011 season. The Mets released him before the regular season for Triple-A began.

=== Personal life ===
Shelton is a cousin of former NFL quarterback Alex Smith.

== See also ==
- Rule 5 draft results
