= Frank Washington =

American basketball player

Frank Washington (4 April 1921 - 24 January 2013) was an American basketball player. He was born and raised in Germantown and graduated from Germantown High School.

Washington was a 6'4" guard from Wilberforce, Ohio. Before joining the US Navy, he played one season for the New York Rens from 1941 to 1942 .

In 1945, he played for the Washington Bears. Washington was part of the first Harlem Globetrotters team to travel around the world. Washington was a member of the Harlem Globetrotters from 1946 to 1960.

After his basketball career, he joined Pepsi-Cola, working in advertising, then sales, and rising to the position of community relations manager.

His daughter Michelle Washington was also a basketball player. Washington died on 24 Jan 2013 at Thomas Jefferson University Hospital at the age of 91.
