= Kinston Indians =

- 1978–2011; Kinston, North Carolina
Team logo
Cap insignia

Minor league affiliations
- Class: Class A-Advanced (1990–2011); Class A (1978–1989)
- League: Carolina League (1978–2011)

Major league affiliations
- Team: Cleveland Indians (1987–2011); Co-op (1986); Toronto Blue Jays (1979–1985); Independent (1978)

Minor league titles
- League titles (5): 1988; 1991; 1995; 2004; 2006
- Division titles (10): 1988; 1990; 1991; 1995; 1996; 1997; 2002; 2005; 2006; 2011

Team data
- Name: Kinston Indians (1987–2011); Kinston Eagles (1986); Kinston Blue Jays (1982–1985); Kinston Eagles (1978–1981)
- Colors: Navy, red, white
- Ballpark: Grainger Stadium (1978–2011)

The Kinston Indians were a Minor League Baseball team of the Carolina League (CL) located in Kinston, North Carolina, from 1978 to 2011. They played their home games at Grainger Stadium, which opened in 1949.

The team began play in 1978 as the Kinston Eagles, borrowing their name from the city's first team of the same name dating back to 1925. They became an affiliate of the Toronto Blue Jays in 1979 and rebranded as the Kinston Blue Jays in 1982. Kinston reverted to the Eagles moniker in 1986 after the Toronto affiliation ended and became the Kinston Indians upon partnering with the Cleveland Indians in 1987. After the 2011 season, the Carolina League franchise was relocated to Zebulon, North Carolina, for the 2012 campaign to become the Carolina Mudcats.

The K-Tribe won the Carolina League championship in 1988, 1991, 1995, 2004, and 2006.

== History ==
=== Early years ===
Kinston was represented by many amateur clubs since the late nineteenth century, but it was unable to sustain a viable professional team until the mid-1920s. Earlier attempts included an aborted campaign in the Class D Eastern Carolina League in 1908 and an "outlaw league" team in 1921 and 1922. The latter was notable for being managed by former major league pitcher George Suggs and College Football Hall of Fame member Ira Rodgers. Due to the efforts of the city's business leaders, former local amateur star Elisha Lewis, and George Suggs, the town secured a professional team in the Virginia League for the 1925 season named the "Eagles".

West End Park tickets: 1929.

The Eagles were a Class B team playing out of a then newly renovated stadium designed by Suggs known as West End Park. The squad had little success against other teams in their league, but was successful enough in gate receipts to validate the city's capacity to sustain a professional team. Kinston's team remained in the Virginia League for three years and then migrated to a newly reformed Eastern Carolina League. This later affiliation collapsed along with the stock market in 1929. The 1920s Eagles' roster included a young catcher named Rick Ferrell, who later had a long playing career and even longer front office career in the major leagues. In 1984, Ferrell became the only former Kinston player inducted into the Baseball Hall of Fame. Another player, Frank Armstrong, gave up baseball for a career in the armed services and became one of the most decorated generals in the history of the Air Force.

=== Coastal Plain League ===
The Great Depression took a great toll on the minor leagues, with only thirteen teams operating across the U.S. at a 1933 low point. Like most, Kinston sat out the first few years of the Great Depression but reentered play for the 1934 season in the semi-professional Coastal Plain League. By 1937 the circuit had become a fully professional, Class D league as ranked by the National Association. The city remained in the Coastal Plain League continuously until it was disbanded after 1952. As a member of this affiliation, Kinston saw many playoff appearances and won league championships in 1935 and 1947. Among the superior talent during this period was a young player named Charlie "King Kong" Keller who is listed as among the top 40 major league players of all-time in terms of on-base percentage (.410).

=== Carolina League ===
Kinston was without a team for the three-year period following the dissolution of the Coastal Plain League. In 1956, the owner of the Burlington Bees of the Carolina League moved his team to Kinston. At that time, the Carolina League was a Class B loop with teams located in Virginia and North Carolina. The team, calling itself the Kinston Eagles, were a Pittsburgh Pirates affiliate and featured the city's first African American ball players. In these early days of the Civil Rights Movement, the black players in the Carolina League received much verbal and psychological abuse from the largely white, Southern fan base. The first black players were Frank Washington and Carl Long. Long excelled during the 1956 season, setting an RBI standard of 111 that has never been surpassed by any later Kinston hitter. The racial experiment succeeded, but the team failed financially. The Eagles' owner was an inept businessman who brought the club near bankruptcy before it was moved 40 miles away to Wilson in 1957.

Carl Long – 2006

Kinston's re-entry into Carolina League baseball in 1962 was successful both on the field and at the turnstile. The Eagles were able to claim the first of its Carolina League crowns. At a time when Kinston's population was only 25,000, the ball club attracted over 140,000 fans. Part of the lure was the talent supplied by Kinston's parent club, the Pittsburgh Pirates, which included Steve Blass (17–3, 1.97 ERA, 209 K's), and Frank Bork (19–7, 2.00 ERA). Another fan attraction was that the Eagles were for the first time a community owned team, operating under the non-profit Kinston Eagles Baseball Company, run by an elected eighteen-man, unpaid board of directors. Profits were reinvested into improving the stadium, promoting the team, and supplying playing equipment for the youth of Kinston. This arrangement continued through all thirteen years of Kinston's second tenure in the Carolina League, from 1962 through 1974.

In 1963 minor league baseball was restructured nationwide, with B, C and D classes eliminated. The Carolina League became a High-A circuit. The Eagles failed to win any championships during this second era of Carolina League play, but they managed to make the playoffs in six of thirteen seasons. The Pirates stuck with Kinston through the 1965 campaign. During three of those four seasons, the Eagles were managed by Harding "Pete" Peterson, who later oversaw the Pirates farm system, and become the Pirates' general manager, helping to build the late seventies team that won the World Series. The Eagles became affiliated with the new Atlanta Braves during 1966 and 1967, under the management of Andy Pafko. From 1968 through 1973 the Eagles were affiliation with the New York Yankees; the fans saw a lot of future all-stars pass through the city including a young Ron Guidry who would soon establish himself as one of the best pitchers in the American League.

During the 1970s the popularity of minor league baseball reached its lowest point and the attendance in Kinston fell to only 30,000 for the 1973 season. The city needed a revival of interest, and the Expos were turned to for help. The young Montreal franchise boasted a strong farm system with a lot of talent. So much talent in fact, that they decided to experiment with having two High A affiliates. Instead of dividing the players evenly between the two, all the top players were placed in the West Palm Beach club, while the newly renamed Kinston Expos had to make do with castoffs. The Kinston team soon found itself overmatched among its Carolina League rivals. The Expos fell to last place and attendance fell to only 27,000 for the year. Montreal declared the experiment a failure and withdrew from Kinston following the 1974 season. With no major league sponsor and very little fan support, Kinston likewise withdrew from the league.

Former airline pilot Ray Kuhlman brought minor league baseball back to Kinston by investing in a Carolina League franchise in the late seventies. The renamed Kinston Eagles flew unaffiliated in their first season back in the circuit in 1978. By the next campaign, they were associated with the Toronto Blue Jays, which remained with Kinston for seven years where the team eventually took on the Blue Jays name in 1979. Kinston did not win any championships during the Blue Jays years. Kuhlman and his wife, Ruth, ran the team themselves and saw steady annual increases in attendance each season. The couple brought in a string of successful marketing ideas for the team which took hold and remained to this day. These included increasing promotional days, fireworks displays, the introduction of yearly Kinston baseball cards, an increase in branded souvenir merchandise, the establishment of the Kinston Professional Baseball Hall of Fame, and the hiring of a team mascot. Another fan attraction was a collection of future major league stars including Pat Borders, Tony Fernández, Cecil Fielder, Nelson Liriano, Fred McGriff and David Wells.

Following the 1985 season, the Blue Jays dropped Kinston as a franchise, and professional baseball in the city seemed to be in doubt once again. There was talk of moving the franchise to Charles County, Maryland, but the city remained in the Carolina League with an independent ball club that took on the Eagles name. 1986 proved to be disappointing in the standings and at the gate, and talk of a move was renewed, but ownership secured an affiliation with the Cleveland Indians during the off season. For twenty-five years, Cleveland and the KTribe, as they came to be known, enjoyed a successful partnership which produced seventeen playoff appearances and five Carolina League championships (1988, 1991, 1995, 2004 and 2006). The value of the team has risen along with its onfield success. In 1983, Kuhlman sold the team for $100,000. The franchise was sold again in 1985 for $225,000, then changed hands again in 1989 for $750,000. The team's value in 1992 was estimated at $1.5 million.

Six figure attendance totals became the norm throughout the 1990s and into the new century. General Manager North Johnson fostered closer bonds with the mayor's office and helped create the Mayor's Committee for Professional Baseball in 1987. Dedicated to increasing season ticket sales and promoting ties with businesses, the committee accomplished much in a short span of time. Attendance increased by nearly twenty thousand in 1987 and by more than twelve thousand the following year. By 1991, the number of fans through the turnstiles topped 100,000 for the first time since 1964. Although a new ownership group purchased the franchise in 1994, continuity in day-to-day operations was maintained through general manager North Johnson, and front office mainstay Shari Massengill who took over the reins in 2006. The local government's dedication to keeping baseball in Kinston is evidenced by extensive new renovations to the ballpark.

The Kinston Indians were last managed by Aaron Holbert, a former major league infielder. Their General Manager through the 2010 season, Shari Massengill, and former Assistant General Manager, Jessie Hays, made up the only all-female General Manager/Assistant General Manager team in the Minor Leagues. When Hays departed for the 2008 season, her replacement, Janell Bullock, was also female. The final GM was Benjamin Jones, who was previously employed by the Wilson Tobs.

In 2007, the Indians won the Southern Division crown for both halves of the year, but they lost in the first round of the playoffs to the wild card team, the Salem Avalanche. It was the seventh consecutive season the Indians made the post season, which is a new Carolina League record formerly held by the Burlington Bees (1945–1950). It was the second time a Kinston team had accomplished this feat as the Kinston Eagles of the Coastal Plain League also made it to seven consecutive post seasons (1946–1952). Kinston's player development contract with Cleveland ended following the 2011 season. In 2012, the franchise moved to Zebulon, North Carolina and was renamed the Carolina Mudcats.

On August 22, 2016, the Texas Rangers announced plans to bring a minor league team back to Kinston. The yet-to-be-named Class A-Advanced team will join the Carolina League starting in the 2017 season. On November 2, the team announced that the new name would be the name that they trademarked on August 15, Down East Wood Ducks.

== Grainger Stadium ==
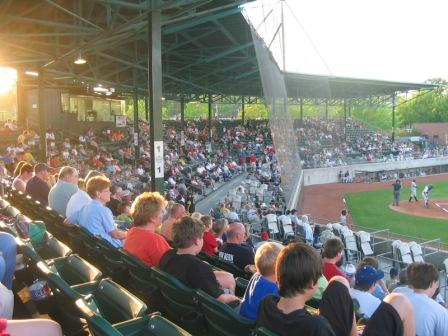
Grainger Grandstand, 2006.

The Kinston Indians, and all the Kinston teams since 1949, played their home games at Grainger Stadium located at 400 East Grainger Avenue in Kinston. The original structure was built by architect John J. Rowland in 1949 at a cost of $170,000 inclusive of everything except the land. $150,000 of the money was raised by bond issue. The stadium is owned by the city and leased by the team. A dedicatory plaque identifies the structure as "Municipal Stadium", but it has been called Grainger Stadium since it was first built. Recent ownership referred to it as "Historic Grainger Stadium" due to its age relative to other fields in the Carolina League. It was the second oldest stadium in the circuit. The name Grainger comes from its location on Grainger Avenue as well as its use early on by Grainger High School. Grainger is a prominent old family name in Lenoir County.

== Annual Awards ==
Each year, usually on the weekend of the last home games, the Kinston Indians presented awards to those deserving. The team MVP Award was named in honor of "Cap'n Pat" Crawford. Crawford was a longtime Kinston resident who made it to the major leagues with the St. Louis Cardinals during the Gashouse Gang era.

Steve Olin was a right-handed submarining relief pitcher for Kinston who had moved up to the Cleveland Indians. He was killed in a boating accident during spring training of 1993 in Winter Haven, Florida. The boat he was in struck a pier, killing him and fellow reliever Tim Crews and seriously injuring Bob Ojeda. Kinston's annual award for Pitcher of the Year was named in his honor.

The award given each year to the player who had to overcome the greatest adversity in his career was named in honor of Tex Drake. Drake was one of the batboys for the Kinston Blue Jays starting with the 1982 season. On the last day of the 1984 campaign, he found out that he had Hodgkin's Disease which had advanced to all four stages. The club president, Gary Fitzpatrick, arranged for Drake to work as a batboy for the last three home games of the Toronto Blue Jays season. Once back in Kinston, Drake was able to overcome his cancer through chemotherapy and return to his duties on the field.

The Kinston player who best represented good sportsmanship was given an award named for Steve Gaydek. Gaydek was a former member of the club's Board of Directors who became a lifelong fan of Kinston's baseball teams. He attended every home game for over twenty years even though he lived over thirty miles from the ballpark.

Lewis B. "Mac" McAvery was the head groundskeeper from 1949 to his death in 1979. In honor of his accomplishments, the team established an award in his name to be given to the individual who has done the most to "preserve and enhance" professional baseball in Kinston.

== Mascots ==
The Indians' last mascot was a dog named Scout. Scout was usually found in an Indians jersey and baseball cap, but was also known to don a Superman t-shirt or an aloha shirt depending on the antics he was performing. Scout replaced an earlier Native American mascot who was named Tom E. Hawk. After the introduction of Scout, Tom E. Hawk no longer greeted fans in person at the ballpark, but he was still seen in several of the official logos on much of the team merchandise through the 2010 season. His broadly smiling visage is very reminiscent of Cleveland's Chief Wahoo. In late 2010, the team released new logos which did not include Tom E. Hawk.

During the days when Kinston was a Toronto Blue Jays affiliate, the team had a bird mascot named B.J. 1980 manager Dennis Holmberg once resorted to dressing up in the mascot's costume so that he could return to the dugout undetected after being ejected from a game. For the 1983 season, the Blue Jays had a dozen teenage girls, known as the Golden Corral Lady Jays, in the stadium. This experiment only lasted the one season.

== Local baseball personalities ==
- Chris Hemeyer: Hemeyer was the radio voice of the Indians as well as the host of Tribe Talk. Tribe Talk was an interview television program shown on local public access stations in southeastern North Carolina. Besides interviewing team members and staff, the show also has highlighted recent Kinston games. First run episodes aired once a week during the season.
- Team Mamas: Anne "Mama" Robinson and Evelyn "Mama" Kornegay were local residents of Kinston who hosted players during their stay in Kinston. Mama Robinson hosted players for the first eleven years of the current franchise (1987–1997), while Mama Kornegay took over the duties until her death in 2010. Although only a few of the team members lived in the house at any one time, the homes became popular gathering places and a home away from home for the club. Prior to this arrangement, players had some difficulty establishing a stable environment in which to live. In his autobiography, Ron Guidry relates how his rented mobile home was sold out from under him while he was gone on Reserve duty. David Wells tells similar stories of being bounced around from place to place during his time in Kinston.
- Delmont Miller: (March 30, 1966 – October 25, 2008): Miller was the longtime scoreboard operator for the Indians. His humorous first inning chatter and "shout-outs" prior to each "KTribe" game had become a tradition at Grainger Stadium. Recognizing the popularity of Delmont with both the fans and the players, the Kinston front office held special "Delmont Miller Nights" and built promotions around his unique personality. His twenty-plus year career at the stadium spanned several ownerships and even major league affiliation changes. Prior to becoming the scoreboard operator, he was the clubhouse assistant for the Kinston Blue Jays. His first name came from his father's love of Del Monte brand peaches. On October 25, 2008, the 42-year-old Miller died of a massive heart attack.
- The Smeraldos: Robert Smeraldo and Robert Smeraldo Jr. were the longtime father/son clubhouse managers for the ballclub. The senior Smeraldo has since died. His son no longer works for the team.

== Season-by-season results ==
Year	Name	League	Level	Affiliation	Record	Manager	Playoffs
1978	Eagles	Carolina	High-A		57–77	Leo Mazzone	
1979	Eagles	Carolina	High-A	Toronto Blue Jays	67–69	Duane Larson	
1980	Eagles	Carolina	High-A	Toronto Blue Jays	69–69	Dennis Holmberg	
1981	Eagles	Carolina	High-A	Toronto Blue Jays	72–68	John McLaren	Lost in 1st round
1982	Blue Jays	Carolina	High-A	Toronto Blue Jays	76–59	John McLaren	
1983	Blue Jays	Carolina	High-A	Toronto Blue Jays	62–76	Clark/Ault	
1984	Blue Jays	Carolina	High-A	Toronto Blue Jays	71–69	Doug Ault	
1985	Blue Jays	Carolina	High-A	Toronto Blue Jays	64–73	Grady Little	Lost in 1st round
1986	Eagles	Carolina	High-A	Co-op	60–75	Dave Trembley	
1987	Indians	Carolina	High-A	Cleveland Indians	75–65	Mike Hargrove	Lost League Finals
1988	Indians	Carolina	High-A	Cleveland Indians	88–52	Glenn Adams	League Champs
1989	Indians	Carolina	High-A	Cleveland Indians	76–60	Ken Bolek	
1990	Indians	Carolina	High-A	Cleveland Indians	88–47	Brian Graham	Lost League Finals
1991	Indians	Carolina	High-A	Cleveland Indians	89–49	Brian Graham	League Champs
1992	Indians	Carolina	High-A	Cleveland Indians	65–71	Dave Keller	
1993	Indians	Carolina	High-A	Cleveland Indians	71–67	Dave Keller	Lost in 1st round
1994	Indians	Carolina	High-A	Cleveland Indians	60–78	Dave Keller	
1995	Indians	Carolina	High-A	Cleveland Indians	81–56	Gordon Mackenzie	League Champs
1996	Indians	Carolina	High-A	Cleveland Indians	76–62	Jack Mull	Lost League Finals
1997	Indians	Carolina	High-A	Cleveland Indians	87–53	Joel Skinner	Lost League Finals
1998	Indians	Carolina	High-A	Cleveland Indians	69–71	Mako Oliveras	
1999	Indians	Carolina	High-A	Cleveland Indians	79–58	Eric Wedge	Lost in 1st round
2000	Indians	Carolina	High-A	Cleveland Indians	68–69	Brad Komminsk	
2001	Indians	Carolina	High-A	Cleveland Indians	89–51	Brad Komminsk	Lost in 1st round
2002	Indians	Carolina	High-A	Cleveland Indians	74–65	Ted Kubiak	Lost League Finals
2003	Indians	Carolina	High-A	Cleveland Indians	73–66	Torey Lovullo	Lost in 1st round
2004	Indians	Carolina	High-A	Cleveland Indians	88–50	Torey Lovullo	League Champs
2005	Indians	Carolina	High-A	Cleveland Indians	76–64	Luis Rivera	Lost League Finals
2006	Indians	Carolina	High-A	Cleveland Indians	85–54	Mike Sarbaugh	League Champs
2007	Indians	Carolina	High-A	Cleveland Indians	87–52	Mike Sarbaugh	Lost in 1st round
2008	Indians	Carolina	High-A	Cleveland Indians	72–66	Chris Tremie	
2009	Indians	Carolina	High-A	Cleveland Indians	60–78	Chris Tremie	
2010	Indians	Carolina	High-A	Cleveland Indians	73–67	Aaron Holbert	Lost in 1st round
2011	Indians	Carolina	High-A	Cleveland Indians	76–62	Aaron Holbert	Lost League Finals

TABLE NOTES:

- DNF = Did Not Finish season.
- Sources

== Playoffs ==
- 1981 season: Lost to Peninsula 1–0 in semifinals.
- 1985 season: Lost to Winston-Salem 2–0 in semifinals.
- 1987 season: Defeated Winston-Salem 2–0 in semifinals; lost to Salem 3–1 in championship.
- 1988 season: Defeated Lynchburg 3–2 to win championship.
- 1990 season: Lost to Frederick 3–2 in championship.
- 1991 season: Defeated Lynchburg 3–0 to win championship.
- 1993 season: Lost to Winston-Salem 2–1 in semifinals.
- 1995 season: Defeated Wilmington 3–0 to win championship.
- 1996 season: Defeated Durham 2–1 in semifinals; lost to Wilmington 3–1 in championship.
- 1997 season: Lost to Lynchburg 3–1 in championship.
- 1999 season: Lost to Myrtle Beach 2–1 in semifinals.
- 2001 season: Lost to Salem 2–1 in semifinals.
- 2002 season: Defeated Myrtle Beach 2–0 in semifinals; lost to Lynchburg 3–1 in championship.
- 2003 season: Lost to Winston-Salem 2–0 in semifinals.
- 2004 season: Defeated Winston-Salem 2–1 in semifinals; defeated Wilmington 3–2 to win championship.
- 2005 season: Defeated Winston-Salem 2–0 in semifinals; lost to Frederick 3–2 in championship.
- 2006 season: Defeated Salem 2–0 in semifinals; defeated Frederick 3–0 to win league championship.
- 2007 season: Lost to Salem 2–1 in semifinals.
- 2010 season: Lost to Winston-Salem 3–0 in semifinals.
- 2011 season: Defeated Myrtle Beach 3–1 in semifinals; lost to Frederick 3–1 in championship.

== No Hitters ==
- Oscar Muñoz (5/26/1991) vs the Prince William Cannons
- Paul Byrd, Scott Morgan, and Mike Soper (8/23/1991) vs the Prince William Cannons
- Jason Rakers (6/4/1997) vs the Durham Bulls (7 inning game)
- Keith Ramsey (9/6/2004) vs the Myrtle Beach Pelicans (perfect game)
- Marty Popham, Chris Jones and Cory Burns (9/5/2010) vs the Potomac Nationals (10 innings)

== See also ==
- Kinston Eagles – Previous baseball teams in Kinston known as the Eagles

== Bibliography ==
=== Autobiographies and biographies ===
- Blomberg, Ron; with Dan Schlossberg (2006). Designated Hebrew: The Ron Blomberg Story. Sports Publishing. ISBN 1-58261-987-5.
- Guidry, Ron; Golenbock, Peter (1980). Guidry. Prentice-Hall, Inc. ISBN 0-13-371609-0.
- Hall, Donald; with Dock Ellis (1989) [1976]. Dock Ellis in the Country of Baseball. Simon & Schuster. ISBN 0-671-65988-X.
- Hargrove, Sharon; Richard Hauer Costa (1989). Safe at Home: A Baseball Wife's Story. Texas A & M University Press. ISBN 0-89096-376-2.
- Rhodes, Jean; Shawn Boburg (2009). Becoming Manny: Inside the Life of Baseball's Most Enigmatic Slugger. Scribner. ISBN 978-1-4165-7706-5.
- Thompson, Dick (2005). The Ferrell Brothers of Baseball. McFarland & Company, Inc. ISBN 0-7864-2006-5.
- Wells, David; with Chris Kreski (2003). Perfect I'm Not: Boomer on Beer, Brawls, Backaches, and Baseball. HarperCollins Publishers, Inc. ISBN 0-06-050824-8.

=== League histories ===
- Chrisman, David F. (1988). The History of the Virginia League. Maverick Publications. ASIN B0006EQIN8.
- Gaunt, Robert (1997). We Would Have Played Forever: The Story of the Coastal Plain Baseball League. Baseball America, Inc. ISBN 0-945164-02-5.
- Holaday, J. Chris (1998). Professional Baseball in North Carolina: An Illustrated City-by-City History, 1901–1996. McFarland & Company, Inc. ISBN 0-7864-0532-5.
- Lloyd, Johnson; Miles Wolff, eds. (2007). The Encyclopedia of Minor League Baseball, third ed. Baseball America, Inc. ISBN 978-1-932391-17-6.
- Sumner, Jim L. (1994). Separating the Men From the Boys: The First Half-Century of the Carolina League. John F. Blair. ISBN 0-89587-112-2.

=== Newspapers ===
- The Kinston Daily Free Press, 1882–2011 – Issues for the 1908 season do not exist. Issues for all other seasons are available on microfilm at Lenoir Community College.

=== Official sources ===
- Kinston Eagles/Expos/Blue Jays/Indians Programs and Roster Sheets – Programs are also referred to as yearbooks.
- "Official league web site". Archived from the original on 2010-05-15.
- "Official team web site". Archived from the original on March 4, 2010.
- Carolina League Record Book. Sports Vue. 1956–2011. – Over the years, this publication has also been known as Carolina League Media Guide and Record Book and Carolina League Directory and Record Book

== Footnotes ==
Preceded by Salem Buccaneers; 1987	Carolina League Champions; Kinston Indians; 1988	Succeeded by Prince William Yankees; 1989
Preceded by Frederick Keys; 1990	Carolina League Champions; Kinston Indians; 1991	Succeeded by Peninsula Pilots; 1992
Preceded by Wilmington Blue Rocks; 1994	Carolina League Champions; Kinston Indians; 1995	Succeeded by Wilmington Blue Rocks; 1996
Preceded by Winston-Salem Warthogs; 2003	Carolina League Champions; Kinston Indians; 2004	Succeeded by Frederick Keys; 2005
Preceded by Frederick Keys; 2005	Carolina League Champions; Kinston Indians; 2006	Succeeded by Frederick Keys; 2007
