= David F. Couch Ballpark =

American baseball stadium

- "The Couch"
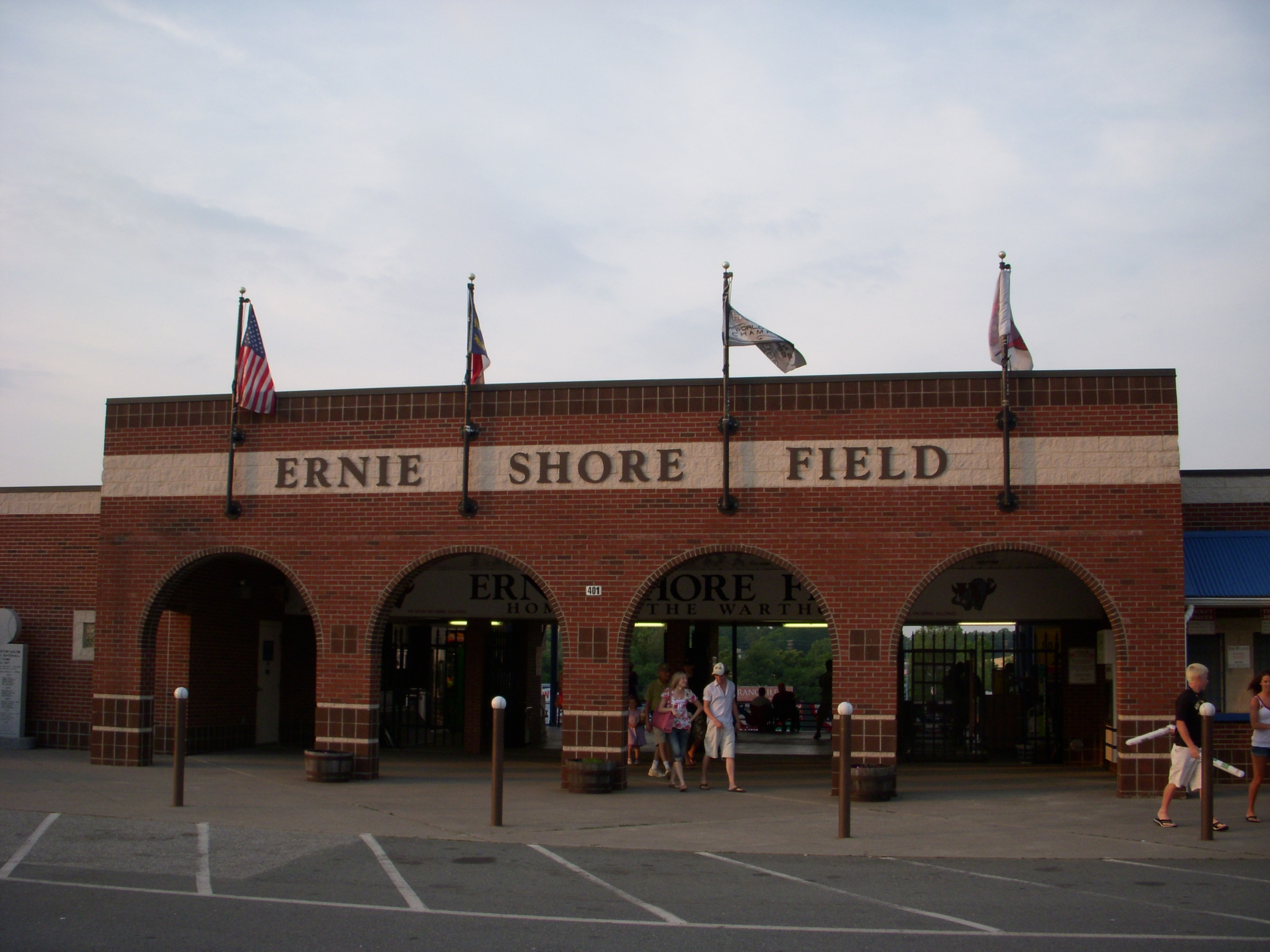
- Entrance to the park
- Interactive map of David F. Couch Ballpark
- Former names: Ernie Shore Field; Gene Hooks Field at Wake Forest Baseball Park
- Location: Winston-Salem, North Carolina, USA
- Coordinates: 36°7′47″N 80°15′8″W
- Owner: Wake Forest University
- Capacity: 3,823
- Surface: AstroTurf GameDay Grass 3D 52H
- Scoreboard: Daktronics
- Field size: Left field: 310 feet (94 m); Center field: 400 feet (120 m); Right field: 300 feet (91 m)

Construction
- Opened: 1956
- Renovated: 1993, 2016
- Expanded: 1993

Tenants
- Winston-Salem Red Birds (CL) 1957–1960; Winston-Salem Red Sox (CL) 1961–1983; Winston-Salem Spirits (CL) 1984–1994; Winston-Salem Warthogs (CL) 1995–2008; Winston-Salem Dash (CL) 2009; Wake Forest Demon Deacons (NCAA) 2009–present

Website
- Official website

David F. Couch Ballpark is a collegiate and former minor-league baseball park in Winston-Salem, North Carolina. The full-time home of the Wake Forest Demon Deacons baseball team, starting in 2009, it was also previously home of the Winston-Salem entry in the Carolina League (currently the Winston-Salem Dash), a role it played since the park opened in 1956.

== History ==
The ballpark is located at 401 Deacon Boulevard, directly east of Truist Field at Wake Forest, home of the Wake Forest Demon Deacons football team. It is bounded by Deacon Boulevard to the south (first base), Shorefair Drive to the east (right field), and Truist Field at Wake Forest to the west (third base). West 32nd Street lies to the north (left field) behind a group of buildings and a parking lot.

Formerly known as Ernie Shore Field, the park was named for major league pitcher and North Carolina native Ernie Shore, who was a teammate of fellow pitcher Babe Ruth when they played for the Boston Red Sox during the 1910s. After Shore retired as a ballplayer, he served as Forsyth County Sheriff and baseball guru for many years. He helped spearhead the drive for a new ballpark, after the decades-old South Side Park had burned. The effort was successful, and the Winston-Salem Twins, as they were then called, had a new home. Since then, the team has gone through various nicknames and has been known as the Winston-Salem Dash since 2009.

The park was also the home field of the Demon Deacons baseball team until they opened Gene Hooks Stadium on campus in 1981. Due to the lack of lights at Gene Hooks Stadium, some early season and necessary night games continued to be played at Ernie Shore Field. Like their now-demolished on-campus ballpark, the extant ballpark was renamed, as Gene Hooks Field at Wake Forest Baseball Park, to honor former Wake Forest athletic director Gene Hooks.

With the resurgence of minor league baseball during the 1980s and 1990s, the stadium underwent many renovations to modernize the facility.

=== Wake Forest ownership ===
The transfer of the stadium to Wake Forest University began in December 2006, when tentative agreements were put into place to sell the field to the University after a new stadium was constructed in downtown Winston-Salem for the Dash. The sale was completed prior to the 2009 baseball season. The new ballpark's construction experienced various delays. The Dash had hoped to begin the 2009 season at the downtown park, but pushed the date back to mid-season. Wake Forest University accommodated the Dash for as much of the 2009 season as necessary. On June 2, the club announced the opening of the new ballpark for the 2010 season, allowing Wake Forest complete control of Wake Forest Baseball Park.

In February 2016, Wake Forest Baseball Park was named David F. Couch Ballpark in honor of former baseball player David Couch ('84). A longtime supporter of Wake Forest athletics and the baseball program, Couch made the lead gift toward the new $14 million Player Development Center, which opened in February 2017.

Along the third-base line, the 41,000 square feet (3,800 m^{2}) facility includes a team locker room, lounge, training room, equipment room, a full kitchen, professional players locker space, also including renovation and relocation of the home dugout and bullpen and construction of a pitching laboratory, complete with 18 high-speed cameras designed to analyze the biomechanics of each player. Future additions will include a video conference room, team meeting room, coaches offices, a Wake Forest baseball heritage area and an indoor batting facility.

== In popular culture ==
The ballpark was used for some key scenes in the 1990 movie Mr. Destiny starring James Belushi and Linda Hamilton. In the movie, Belushi's character travels back in time to "try again" in a life-altering high school baseball game.

== See also ==
- List of NCAA Division I baseball venues
