= Myrtle Beach Pelicans =

Minor League Baseball team in South Carolina

- Founded in 1999; Myrtle Beach, South Carolina
Team logo
Cap insignia

Minor league affiliations
- Class: Single-A (2021–present)
- Previous classes: Class A-Advanced (1999–2020)
- League: Carolina League (1999–present)
- Division: South Division

Major league affiliations
- Team: Chicago Cubs (2015–present)
- Previous teams: Texas Rangers (2011–2014); Atlanta Braves (1999–2010)

Minor league titles
- League titles (4): 1999; 2000; 2015; 2016
- Division titles (9): 1999; 2000; 2002; 2008; 2011; 2013; 2014; 2015; 2016
- First-half titles (2): 2022; 2023
- Second-half titles (1): 2025

Team data
- Name: Myrtle Beach Pelicans (1999–present)
- Previous names: Danville 97s (1998); Durham Bulls (1980–1997)
- Colors: Pelicans Blue, Pelicans Gold, Pelicans Navy, White
- Mascots: Splash; Rally Shark; Slider
- Ballpark: Pelicans Ballpark (1999–present)
- Previous parks: American Legion Field (1998); Durham Bulls Athletic Park (1995–1997); Durham Athletic Park (1980–1994)
- Owner/ Operator: Myrtle Beach Pelicans LP
- President: Ryan Moore
- General manager: Kristin Call
- Manager: Yovanny Cuevas
- Media: TuneIn Radio
- Website: milb.com/myrtle-beach

The Myrtle Beach Pelicans are a Minor League Baseball team in Myrtle Beach, South Carolina, and the Single-A affiliate of the Chicago Cubs of the National League in Major League Baseball. The Pelicans compete in the Carolina League. Home games are played at Pelicans Ballpark, which opened in 1999 and seats up to 6,599 people.

The Pelicans have been members of the Carolina League since 1999 and most recently won the league's championship in 2016. In the 2021 reorganization of Minor League Baseball, the Pelicans continued as the Cubs' Low-A affiliate in the Low-A East. This league was renamed the Carolina League and reclassified as Single-A in 2022.

From their inaugural season through 2010, they were affiliated with the Atlanta Braves, also of the National League, before spending four seasons as a Texas Rangers (American League) affiliate from 2011 to 2014. The team's current affiliation with the Chicago Cubs began in 2015.

== History ==
Previously, this franchise was known as the Durham Bulls, the Minor League Baseball team featured in the 1988 film Bull Durham starring Kevin Costner, Susan Sarandon, and Tim Robbins. The Carolina League team was relocated following the 1997 season as a result of the expansion of the top-level Triple-A International League into Durham, North Carolina, where the new franchise assumed the "Bulls" name. The Carolina League franchise then spent the 1998 season in Danville, Virginia, as the Danville 97s while awaiting a further move to Myrtle Beach in coastal South Carolina while Coastal Federal Field was under construction. Their first home game as the Myrtle Beach Pelicans was played on April 12, 1999, against the Potomac Cannons with 5,521 people in attendance. In the first at bat, Pelicans pitcher Luis Rivera struck out Cannons hitter Esix Snead looking. The first two hits at the stadium were home runs for each team, first by Potomac's Andy Bevins, and later that same game by Myrtle Beach's Ryan Lehr.

Their ballpark has since been renamed Pelicans Ballpark, which is a family-friendly stadium with a speed pitch, obstacle course, and moon bounce on the concourse. In 2004, the sports publication Baseball America rated it as the second-best Class-A level ballpark in the United States, and the best in the Carolina League in 2009. For four consecutive seasons (2011–2014), Stadium Journey ranked the Pelicans as the top stadium experience in the Carolina League and one of the publication's "Top 50 Stadium Experiences" in all of sports, while the website TripAdvisor named the team as the third-best attraction in Myrtle Beach.

Some games are televised on Marquee Sports Network, which is not available in South Carolina.

=== Notable games ===
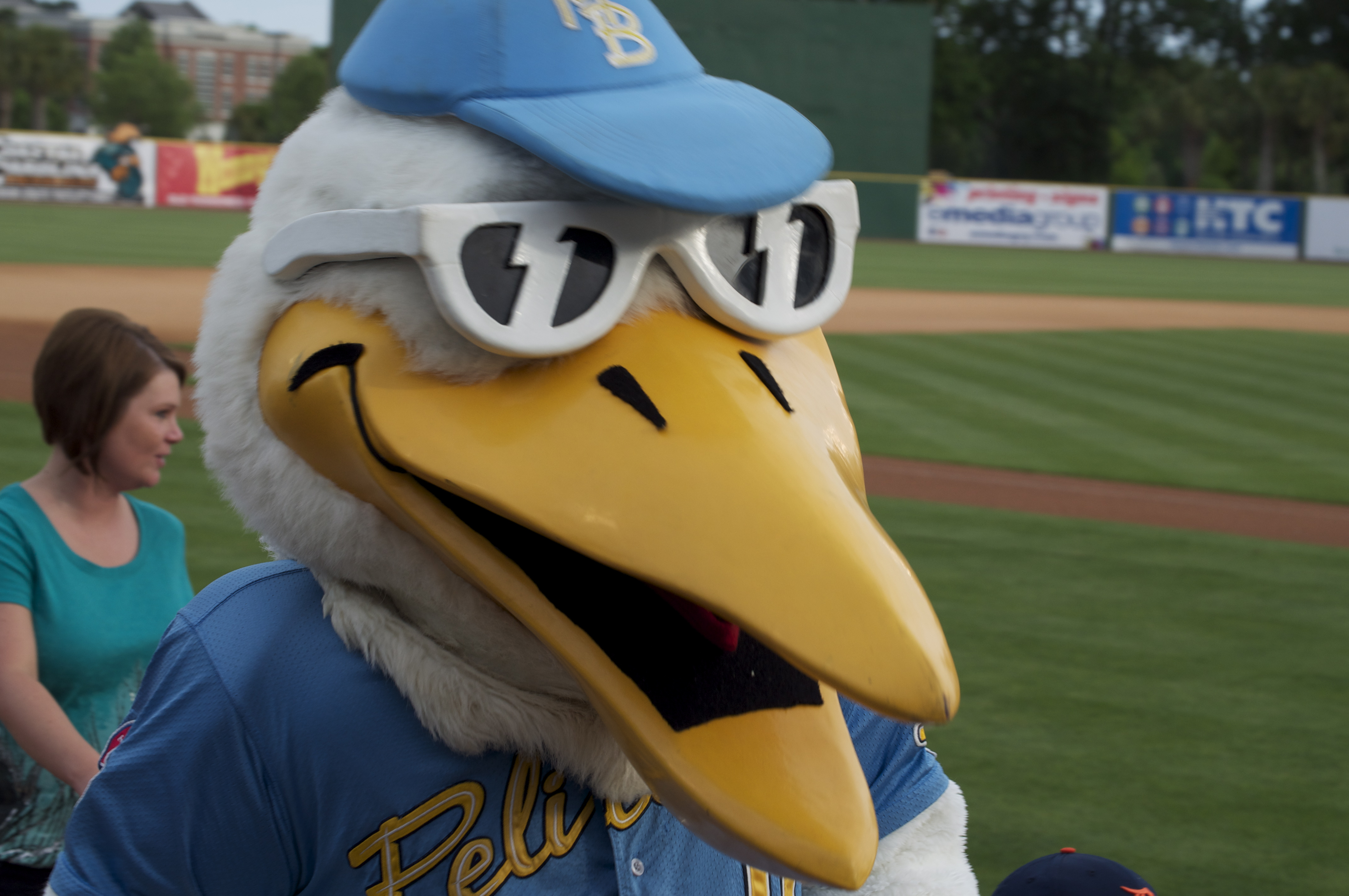
Splash, one of the team mascots

In their first season, the Pelicans advanced to the 1999 Carolina League Mills Cup Championship series. The best-of-five series against the Wilmington Blue Rocks was tied 2–2, with the deciding Game 5 set to be played in Myrtle Beach, when the series was cancelled because of Hurricane Floyd. The two teams were named co-champions for that season.

Myrtle Beach won both the first and second-half Southern Division titles in 2008 under Rocket Wheeler, who was named Carolina League Manager of the Year. The following season, Jason Heyward played over half the year in Myrtle Beach en route to being named Baseball America's 2009 Minor League Player of the Year.

On July 3, 2014, the Pelicans' home game with the Winston-Salem Dash was broadcast on the CBS Sports Network, the first time the Pelicans were on live national television.

=== Front office changes ===
In early 2006, Capitol Broadcasting Company announced plans to sell the Pelicans. The current owner is Myrtle Beach Pelicans LP, a group led by lawyer Chuck Greenberg.

On November 20, 2012, General Manager Scott Brown left to join the Triple-A Charlotte Knights of the International League. A month later, on December 21, 2012, the Pelicans hired Andy Milovich to become the club's Vice President and General Manager. By January 14, 2015, Milovich was promoted to President and General Manager.

On September 16, 2014, the Myrtle Beach Pelicans reached an agreement on a player development contract (PDC) with the Chicago Cubs of the National League, beginning with the 2015 season.

On December 2, 2021, Kristin Call, the team's former associate general manager, was promoted to general manager, making her the first female general manager in team history.

=== Reclassification ===
On February 12, 2020, it was announced that the Pelicans, who played at the Advanced-A level of minor league baseball since the team was started in 1999, would move to Low-A in a new Major League Baseball player development alignment. The Pelicans swapped places with the Chicago Cubs' affiliate in South Bend, Indiana, which was feeding players to the Pelicans as they moved up in the Cubs' organization. The move meant that the Pelicans will predominantly get players who are in their first full seasons of pro ball. Dropping a level, the Pelicans were closer to their division opponents. The Pelicans were placed in the South Division of Low-A East, which comprises three divisions. The Charleston RiverDogs, Columbia Fireflies, and Augusta GreenJackets in North Augusta, South Carolina, are in the South Division as well. In 2022, the Low-A East became known as the Carolina League, the name historically used by the regional circuit prior to the 2021 reorganization, and was reclassified as a Single-A circuit.

== Playoffs ==
- 1999 season: Defeated Kinston 2–1 in semifinals; tied Wilmington 2–2 in championship.
- 2000 season: Defeated Lynchburg 3–0 to win championship.
- 2002 season: Lost to Kinston 2–0 in semifinals.
- 2008 season: Defeated Winston-Salem 3–1 in semifinals; lost to Potomac 3–1 in championship.
- 2011 season: Lost to Kinston 3–1 in semifinals.
- 2012 season: Lost to Winston-Salem 2–1 in semifinals.
- 2013 season: Lost to Salem 2–0 in semifinals.
- 2014 season: Defeated Salem 2–1 in semifinals; lost to Potomac 3–1 in championship.
- 2015 season: Defeated Winston-Salem 2–1 in semifinals; defeated Wilmington 3–0 to win championship.
- 2016 season: Defeated Salem 2–1 in semifinals; defeated Lynchburg 3–1 to win championship.
- 2017 season: Lost to Down East 2–0 in semifinals.
- 2022 season: Lost to Charleston 2-0 in semifinals.
- 2023 season: Lost to Charleston 2-1 in semifinals.
- 2025 season: Lost to Columbia 2-0 in semifinals.

== Notable former players ==
Several Pelicans have gone on to play in the major leagues. Some of these are:

- Elvis Andrus, Oakland Athletics shortstop
- Scott Effross (born 1993), New York Yankees pitcher
- Jeff Francoeur, Former MLB outfielder
- Freddie Freeman, Los Angeles Dodgers first baseman and 2020 NL MVP
- Rafael Furcal, All Star shortstop
- Marcus Giles, All Star second baseman
- Justin Grimm, free agent relief pitcher
- Tommy Hanson, Former MLB starting pitcher
- Matt Harrison, Texas Rangers starting pitcher
- Kyle Hendricks, Chicago Cubs starting pitcher
- Mike Hessman, Professional baseball player
- Jason Heyward, Los Angeles Dodgers outfielder
- Craig Kimbrel, Chicago White Sox relief pitcher
- Adam LaRoche, Former MLB first baseman
- Jason Marquis, Former MLB All Star starting pitcher
- Brian McCann, Former MLB catcher
- Kris Medlen, Former MLB starting pitcher
- Rougned Odor, Baltimore Orioles infielder
- Martin Prado, Miami Marlins infielder
- Jarrod Saltalamacchia, Former MLB catcher
- Julio Teherán, Detroit Tigers starting pitcher
- Jonny Venters, Washington Nationals relief pitcher
- Arodys Vizcaino, free agent relief pitcher
- Adam Wainwright, St. Louis Cardinals starting pitcher
- Joey Gallo, New York Yankees infielder

=== Retired numbers ===
Myrtle Beach has honored three of its members by retiring their uniform numbers.

No.	Person	Position	Seasons
2	Rafael Furcal	Shortstop	1999–2000
18	Rocket Wheeler	Manager	2006–2010
43	Bruce Dal Canton	Pitching coach	1999–2007

== Roster ==
Myrtle Beach Pelicans roster
Players	Coaches/Other
Pitchers: 11 Ethan Bell; 3 David Bracho; 38 Kevin Camacho; 50 Pierce Coppola; 32 Noah Edders; 33 Ethan Flanagan; 7 Jostin Florentino; -- Hayden Frank; 34 Christian Gordon; -- Mason McGwire; 20 Edwardo Melendez; 35 Luis A. Reyes; 41 Alfredo Romero; 55 Brayden Spears; -- JP Wheat; 16 Victor Zarraga; Catchers: -- Owen Ayers; 19 Michael Carico; 5 Jairo Diaz; 24 Dilan Granadillo; 51 Justin Stransky; Infielders: 8 Angel Cepeda; 9 Jose Escobar; 22 Matt Halbach; 17 Cole Mathis; 53 Yahil Melendez; -- Eriandys Ramon; 39 Ty Southisene; Outfielders: 40 Derik Alcantara; 52 Kane Kepley; 54 Eli Lovich; 25 Alexey Lumpuy	Manager: 15 Yovanny Cuevas; Coaches: -- Andrew Betcher (pitching); -- Luis Hernandez (pitching); 45 D'Angelo Jiménez (bench); 6 Kyle Sutherland (development); 28 Roberto Vaz (hitting); 60-day injured list: 27 Yoendris Gonzalez; 30 Thomas Mangus; 7-day injured list; * On Chicago Cubs 40-man roster; ~ Development list; # Rehab assignment; ∞ Reserve list; ‡ Restricted list; § Suspended list; † Temporarily inactive list; Roster updated March 29, 2026; Transactions; → More rosters: MiLB • Carolina League; → Chicago Cubs minor league players

== See also ==
- Current and former players
