= Pelicans Ballpark =

Baseball stadium in Myrtle Beach, South Carolina

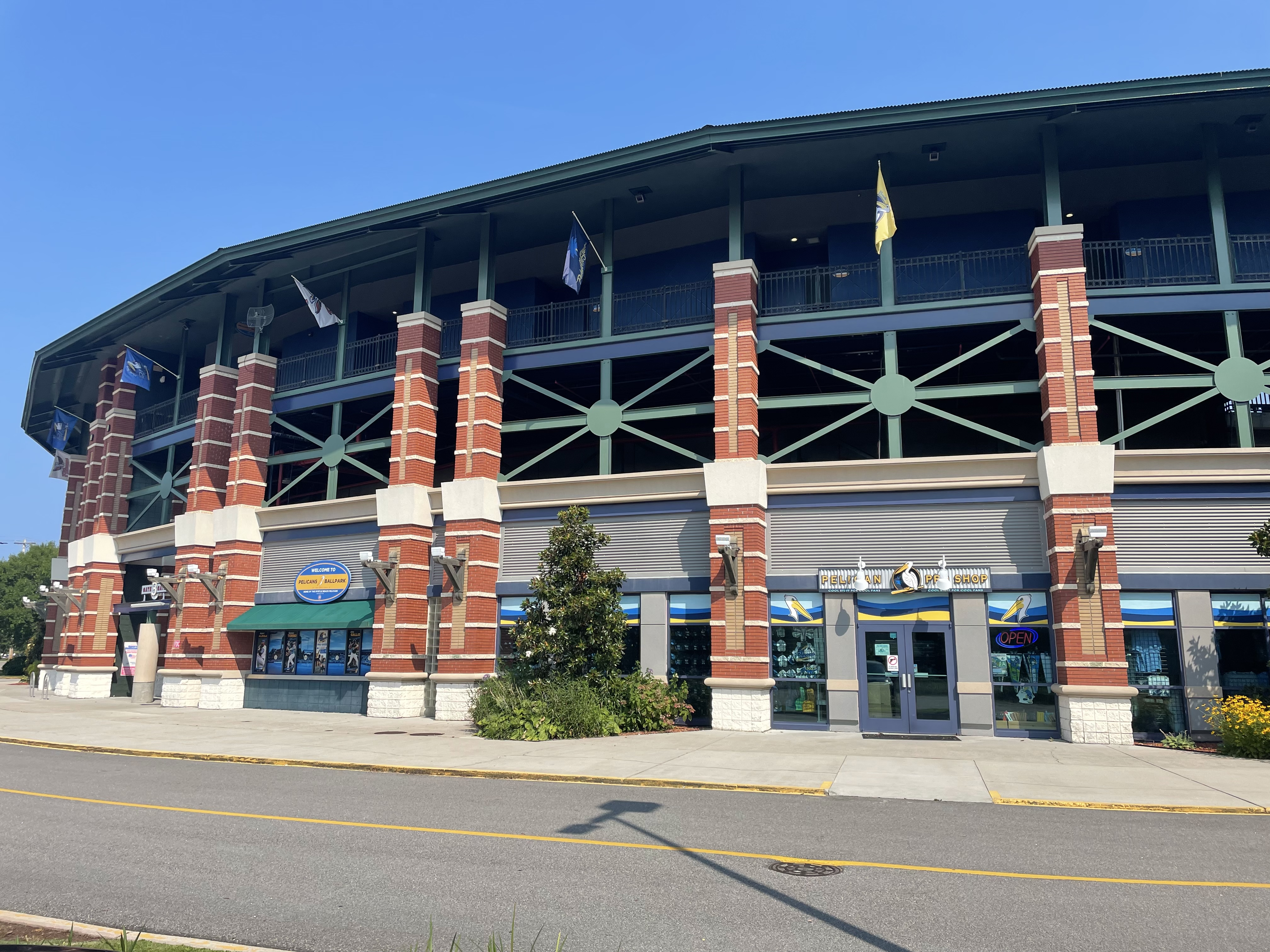
- Interactive map of Pelicans Ballpark
- Former names: TicketReturn.com Field at Pelicans Ballpark (2012–2022); BB&T Coastal Field (2007–2011); Coastal Federal Field (1999–2007)
- Address: 1251 21st Avenue North; Myrtle Beach, SC 29577
- Coordinates: 33.711682°N 78.8845°W
- Owner: City of Myrtle Beach 70% / Horry County 30%
- Operator: City of Myrtle Beach
- Capacity: 6,599
- Surface: Tifway 419 Bermuda Grass
- Field size: Left field: 308 feet (94 m); Center field: 400 feet (120 m); Right field: 328 feet (100 m)

Construction
- Groundbreaking: March 11, 1998
- Opened: April 12, 1999
- Cost: $12.8 million ($24.7 million in 2025 dollars)
- Architect: Mozingo + Wallace Architects
- Project manager: Opening Day Partners
- Services engineers: Rast & Associates, Inc.
- General contractor: McDevitt Street Bovis, Inc.

Tenants
- Myrtle Beach Pelicans (CL/Low-A East) 1999–present; Coastal Carolina Chanticleers (NCAA) 2013–2014

Pelicans Ballpark (previously known as Coastal Federal Field, BB&T Coastal Field, and TicketReturn.com Field) is located in Myrtle Beach, South Carolina, and is the home field of the Myrtle Beach Pelicans, a minor league affiliate of the Chicago Cubs in the Carolina League. The stadium opened in 1999. It holds up to 6,599 people. Since its opening, it has been the finish point of the annual Myrtle Beach Marathon, held annually in March.

On April 16, 2021, Myrtle Beach Pelicans leaders told WPDE-TV that the facility would need significant investments in order to keep Minor League Baseball there. The most urgent upgrades to Pelicans Ballpark are to the visiting and home clubhouses, additional team facilities for women staff members, and upgrades to lighting and wall height. The team general manager told the city council during its budget retreat that it is likely to cost $15 million to bring the stadium's current player development facilities up to par and that the stadium won't last another 20 years as it stands.

On April 27, 2023, it was announced that the team’s lease agreement with the city of Myrtle Beach and Horry County will expire at the end of this season. Pelicans Ballpark is due for major upgrades worth tens of millions, but some members of county council want out of the deal with one council member asking if they could sell their share for $1. The county attorney stated it was a horrible contract and that the only way they can get out of the contract is to breach it, which is a possibility.

== Other tenants ==
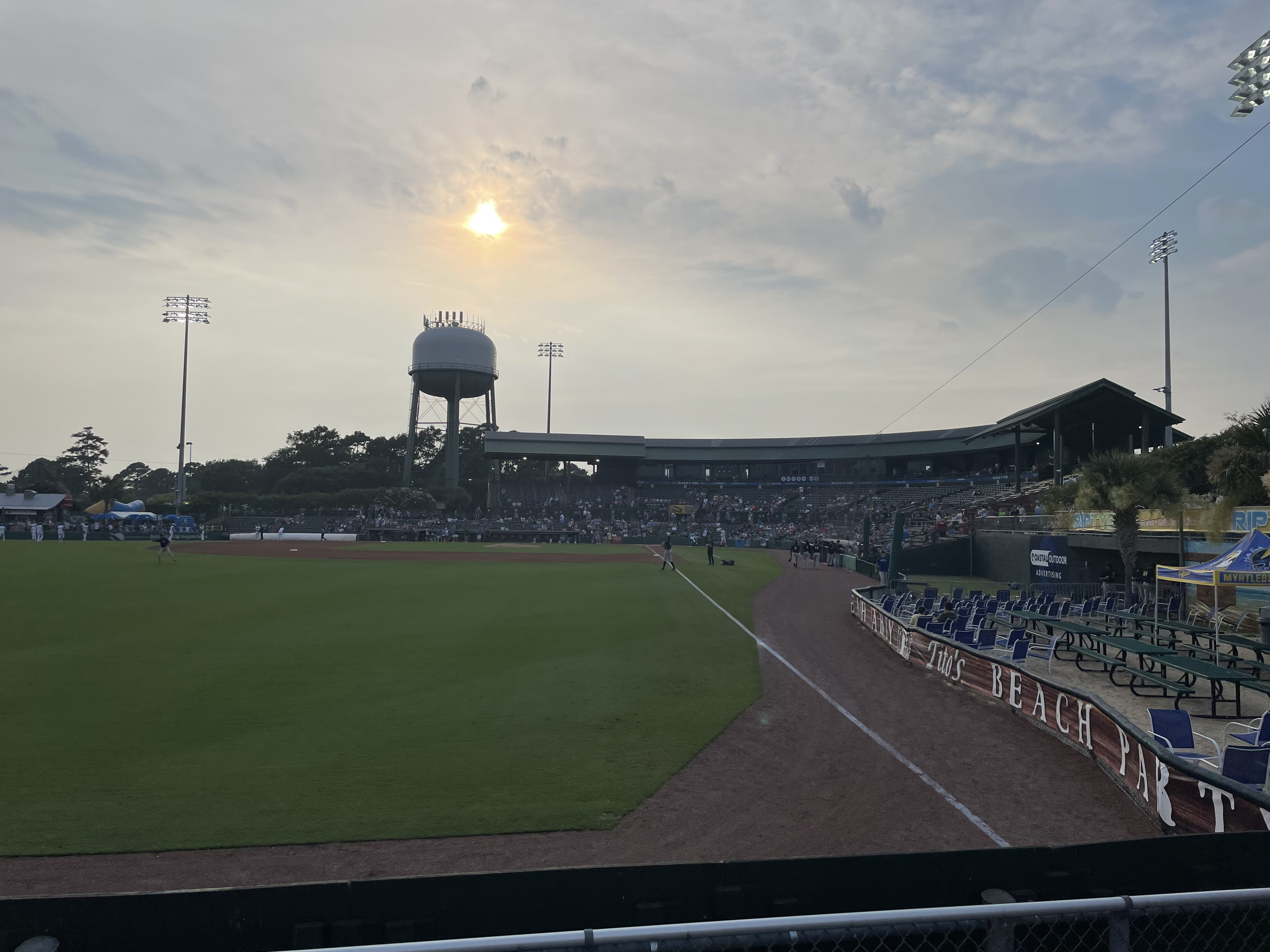
Pelicans Ballpark in 2023

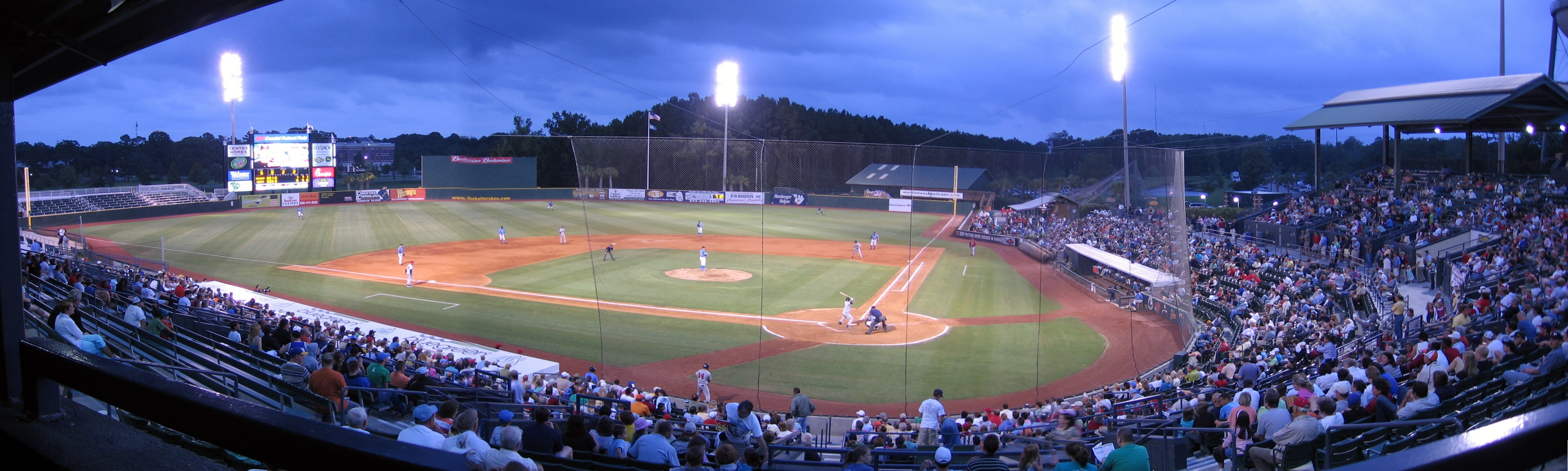
Pelicans Ballpark in 2007

Pelicans Ballpark formerly was the site of the annual "Baseball At The Beach" collegiate baseball tournament which has since moved to Springs Brooks Stadium on the campus of Coastal Carolina University. While Charles Watson Stadium was renovated during the 2013 season, the Chanticleers played their home schedule at TicketReturn.com Field.

The venue served as a regional host site for the 2007 NCAA Division I baseball tournament. Coastal Carolina hosted the regional, with VCU, Clemson, and St. John's also participating. The ballpark also hosted a regional and super regional in the 2010 NCAA tournament, with the Chanticleers ultimately losing the super regional to South Carolina in the Gamecocks' first national championship season.

The Texas Rangers (then parent club of the Pelicans) played an exhibition game on March 29 at Pelicans Ballpark against Coastal Carolina University as a part of 2011 spring training.

Season 3 of HBO's Eastbound & Down was filmed there.
