= Wilmington Blue Rocks =

- Founded in 1993; Wilmington, Delaware
Team logo
Cap insignia

Minor league affiliations
- Class: High-A (2021–present)
- Previous classes: Class A-Advanced (1993–2020)
- League: South Atlantic League (2021–present)
- Division: North Division
- Previous leagues: Carolina League (1993–2020)

Major league affiliations
- Team: Washington Nationals (2021–present)
- Previous teams: Kansas City Royals (2007–2020); Boston Red Sox (2005–2006); Kansas City Royals (1993–2004)

Minor league titles
- League titles (5): 1994; 1996; 1998; 1999; 2019
- Division titles (6): 1993; 1995; 2001; 2004; 2015; 2019

Team data
- Name: Wilmington Blue Rocks (1993–present)
- Colors: Light blue, navy, gray, buff, celery, white
- Ballpark: Daniel S. Frawley Stadium (1993–present)
- Owner(s)/ Operator(s): Clark Minker, Main Street Baseball
- General manager: Liz Welch
- Manager: Ted Tom
- Website: milb.com/wilmington

The Wilmington Blue Rocks are a Minor League Baseball team of the South Atlantic League and the High-A affiliate of the Washington Nationals. They are located in Wilmington, Delaware, and play their home games at Daniel S. Frawley Stadium.

== Franchise history ==
Daniel S. Frawley Stadium during a game, April 2026

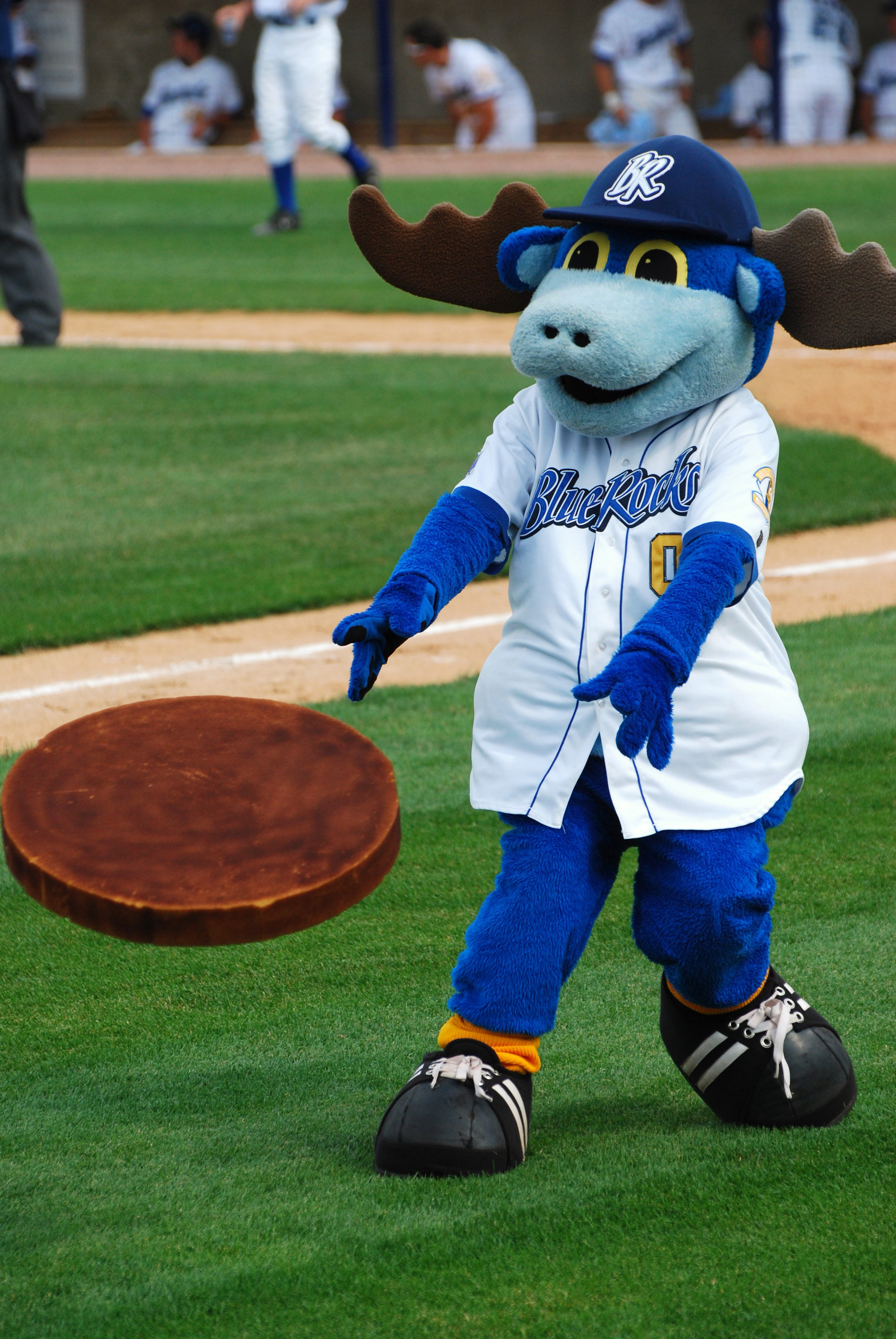
Rocky Bluewinkle, mascot of the Wilmington Blue Rocks

The Blue Rocks played in the Carolina League, an advanced Single-A league in minor league baseball, from 1993 to 2020. The name "Blue Rocks" was chosen because of the blue granite found along the Brandywine River in Wilmington. The Blue Rocks play at Judy Johnson Field at Daniel S. Frawley Stadium in Wilmington's growing Riverfront district and was instrumental in bringing commerce and public attention to the once ignored and dilapidated area of the city.

The Blue Rocks played their first season in 1993 when the Peninsula Pilots were purchased and relocated to the riverfront in Wilmington, Delaware. Principal owner Frank Boulton and co-owner Bud Harrelson bought the franchise in 1992, moved the team from Hampton, Virginia, and changed their affiliation from the Seattle Mariners' farm system to the Kansas City Royals'. When the franchise moved to Wilmington in 1993, the ballpark was known as Legends Stadium, after the sports legends of Delaware. After Frawley, the Wilmington mayor who played a major role in the creation of the team, died while playing a recreational basketball game, the stadium was renamed Daniel S. Frawley Stadium in his honor.

The Blue Rocks were a Kansas City farm team from their inception, except for the 2005 and 2006 seasons when the team was affiliated with the Boston Red Sox. In 2020, with the re-organization of the minor leagues, the Blue Rocks became an affiliate of the Washington Nationals.

In 2005, the Blue Rocks were featured in SportsCenter's 50 States in 50 Days. Matt Winer reported from a set in left field where SportsCenter did stories on the many mascots of the Blue Rocks. The Aug 19 game featuring SportsCenter drew the Blue Rocks' largest crowd in team history.

The Blue Rocks played host to the 2014 California/Carolina League All Star Game, having previously hosted the game last 12 years earlier in 2002. The California League All Stars ousted the Carolina League All Stars 3-2. Kyle Waldrop of the Bakersfield Blaze took home the game's MVP award.

On July 15, 2019, Jonathan Bowlan pitched the second no-hitter in franchise history against the Carolina Mudcats. He struck out nine batters, walking none on 97 pitches.

The Blue Rocks won the 2019 Mills Cup Championship for the first time since 1999, closing a five-game series with the Fayetteville Woodpeckers with a 2-0 victory on September 14, 2019.

In December 2020, the Blue Rocks were officially invited to become an affiliate of the Washington Nationals, joining the Nationals' minor league system beginning with the 2021 season. In further conjunction with Major League Baseball's restructuring of Minor League Baseball in 2021, the Blue Rocks were organized into the High-A East. In 2022, the High-A East became known as the South Atlantic League, the name historically used by the regional circuit prior to the 2021 reorganization.

== Roster ==
The Wilmington Blue Rocks' alternate logo

Wilmington Blue Rocks roster
Players		Coaches/Other
Pitchers: 25 Austin Amaral; 39 Merrick Baldo; 47 Tucker Biven; -- Adam Bloebaum; -- Gavin Bruni; 13 Jackson Dannelley; 10 Carson Fischer; 26 Brady Hill; 24 Gus Hughes; 35 Chance Huff; 23 Riley Maddox; 48 Grant Manning; 16 Euri Montero; 22 Bryan Polanco; 29 Jacob Roberts; 27 R.J. Sales; 45 Miguel Sime Jr.; 34 Baron Stuart; 41 Liam Sullivan; 38 Mikey Tepper	Catchers Infielders: 12 Ronny Cruz; 3 Luke Dickerson; 15 Angel Feliz; 6 Chris Hacopian; 9 Jacob Walsh; Outfielders: 17 Teo Banks; 1 Yeremy Cabrera; 40 Jack Moroknek; 8 Jorgelys Mota; 11 Elijah Nunez	Manager: 7 Ted Tom; Coaches: 4 Mitchell Boe (defensive); 30 Hudson Byorick (hitting); 31 Niko Leontarakis (assistant pitching); 43 Justin Lord (pitching); 40 Jefferson Valladares (coach); 7-day injured list; * On Washington Nationals 40-man roster; ~ Development list; # Rehab assignment; ∞ Reserve list; ‡ Restricted list; § Suspended list; † Temporarily inactive list; Roster updated November 2, 2026; Transactions; → More rosters: MiLB • South Atlantic League; → Washington Nationals minor league players

== Playoffs ==
Season	Semifinals	Finals
1993	W, 2–0, Frederick	L, 3–1, Winston-Salem
1994	-	W, 3–0, Winston-Salem
1995	W, 2–0, Prince William	L, 3–0, Kinston
1996	-	W, 3–1, Kinston
1997	-	-
1998	-	W, 3–1, Winston-Salem
1999	-	T, 2–2, Myrtle Beach
2000	-	-
2001	W, 2–1, Frederick	L, 3–2, Salem
2002	L, 2–1, Lynchburg	-
2003	L, 2–0, Lynchburg	-
2004	W, 2–1, Potomac	L, 3–2, Kinston
2005	-	-
2006	L, 2–1, Frederick	-
2007	L, 2–0, Frederick	-
2008	L, 3–0, Potomac	-
2009	L, 3–2, Lynchburg	-
2010	-	-
2011	-	-
2012	L, 2–1, Lynchburg	-
2013	-	-
2014	-	-
2015	W, 2–0 Lynchburg	L, 3–0, Myrtle Beach
2016	-	-
2017	-	-
2018	-	-
2019	W, 3–2 Salem	W, 3–2, Fayetteville

== Players of note ==
More than 200 Blue Rocks have gone on to the major leagues, including All-Stars Carlos Beltrán, Lance Carter, Johnny Damon, Jacoby Ellsbury, Zack Greinke, Jon Lieber, Jed Lowrie, José Rosado, and Mike Sweeney. Other former Blue Rock players of note include:

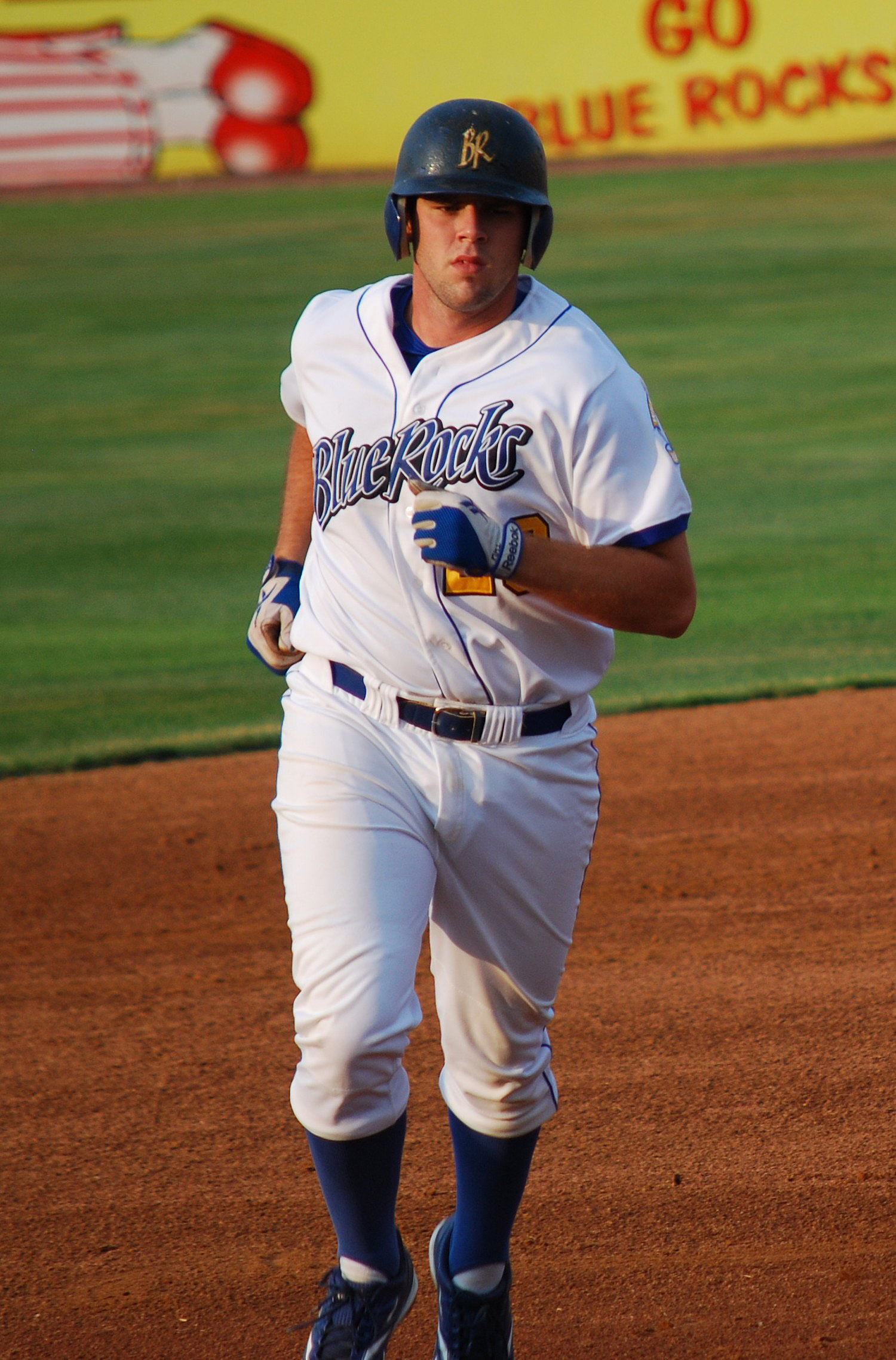
Mike Moustakas during his tenure with the Wilmington Blue Rocks in 2009

- Jeremy Affeldt
- Clay Buchholz
- David DeJesus
- Danny Duffy
- Chad Durbin
- Mark Ellis
- Sal Fasano
- Raúl González
- Whit Merrifield
- Eric Hosmer
- Sean Manaea
- Mike Moustakas
- Jake Odorizzi
- Salvador Perez
- Aníbal Sánchez
- Brady Singer
- Michael Tucker

=== Retired numbers ===
- 18 Johnny Damon
- 33 Mike Sweeney
- 36 Robin Roberts, played for the earlier Blue Rocks team
- 42 Jackie Robinson (retired throughout baseball)

== Mascots ==
The Blue Rocks have three mascots. Rocky Bluewinkle is a blue moose, who frequently roams around the stadiums during games. Mr. Celery is a stalk of celery who comes out and dances to "Song 2" by Blur whenever Wilmington scores a run. Rubble is a giant blue rock who mainly appears on merchandise.

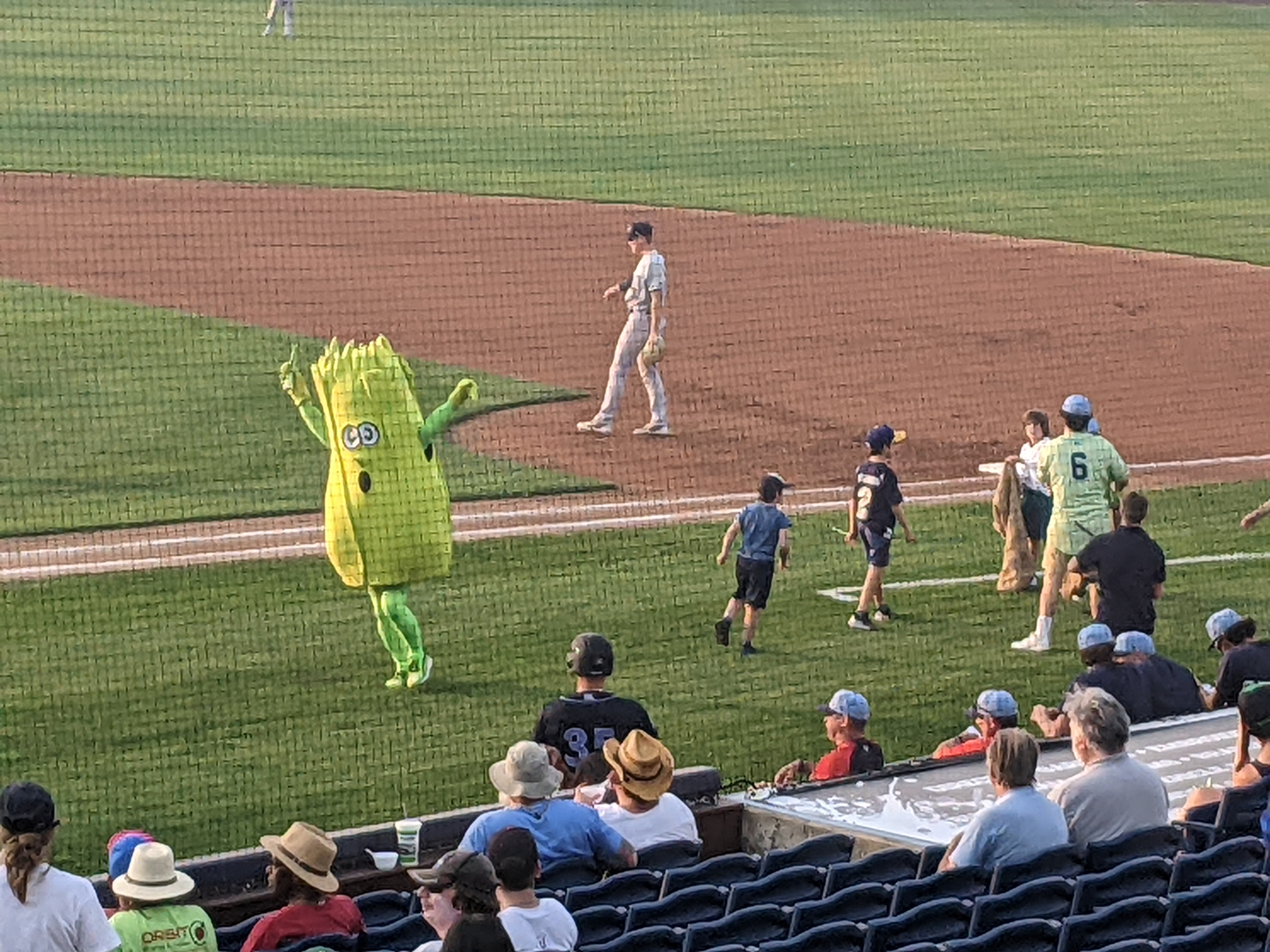
Mr. Celery runs along the first base line, arms aloft, clutching a stalk of celery.

== See also ==
- Delaware Sports Museum and Hall of Fame
- Wilmington Quicksteps
- Wilmington Park
- List of professional sports teams in Delaware
