= Potomac Nationals =

- 1984–2019; Woodbridge, Virginia
Team logo
Cap insignia

Minor league affiliations
- Class: Class A-Advanced (1990–2019); Class A (1984–1989)
- League: Carolina League (1984–2019)

Major league affiliations
- Team: Washington Nationals (2005–2019); Cincinnati Reds (2003–2004); St. Louis Cardinals (1997–2002); Chicago White Sox (1994–1996); New York Yankees (1987–1993); Pittsburgh Pirates (1984–1986)

Minor league titles
- League titles (4): 1989; 2008; 2010; 2014
- Division titles (9): 1989; 1991; 1995; 2004; 2008; 2010; 2013; 2014; 2018

Team data
- Name: Potomac Nationals (2005–2019); Potomac Cannons (1999–2004); Prince William Cannons (1989–1998); Prince William Yankees (1987–1988); Prince William Pirates (1984–1986)
- Colors: Red, white, blue
- Mascot: Uncle Slam (2005–2019); Big Shot (1995–2004); Prince Willie (1987–1997); Boomer (1992–1995)
- Ballpark: Northwest Federal Field at Pfitzner Stadium (1984–2019)

The Potomac Nationals were a Minor League Baseball team of the Carolina League. They were located in Woodbridge, Virginia, and played their home games at Northwest Federal Field at Pfitzner Stadium. After the 2019 season, the team relocated to Fredericksburg, Virginia, becoming the Fredericksburg Nationals.

== History ==
The Alexandria Dukes moved from Alexandria, Virginia, to Woodbridge for the 1984 season and were renamed the Prince William Pirates. Subsequently, the team was named the Prince William Yankees, Prince William Cannons, Potomac Cannons, and the Potomac Nationals.

The team was affiliated with Pittsburgh Pirates, New York Yankees, Chicago White Sox, St. Louis Cardinals, Cincinnati Reds, and lastly the Washington Nationals. The franchise played all its home games at Northwest Federal Field at Pfitzner Stadium, with an announced seating capacity of 6,000 people. The team mascot was Uncle Slam, a blue creature resembling Uncle Sam in hair and attire.

== Relocation ==
=== Previous attempts ===
The team sought a better ballpark for at least twenty years. When Prince William County officials rejected a 1998 proposal for a $150 million sports and entertainment complex on the Cherry Hill Peninsula by the Potomac River, team owner Art Silber changed the team name from Prince William Cannons to Potomac Cannons and announced an effort to move to Fairfax County. In 2000, the team proposed a $250 million stadium and apartment complex next to Fairfax County's Dunn Loring Metro station, but county officials rejected it in 2001. In 2002, the team and Prince William County officials reached an agreement to build a new $10 million stadium tentatively sited next to Pfitzner Stadium. In 2005, the team announced preliminary details about construction of the stadium, due to open in 2007, but with the site undecided.

Another ballpark proposal began as early as 2010. In 2011, Silber said he was looking for a site along I-95 in Prince William and that a stadium would be privately funded. By 2012 the proposal was focused on a site on I-95 in Woodbridge. The team and the county were reported to be close to a deal in December 2016. The county would raise $35 million in municipal bonds, lease the site, pay for site preparation, construct the stadium, and lease it to the team for thirty years. The team would cover the county's annual debt service and site lease costs. The county also would build a 1,400-space parking garage next to the stadium for stadium and commuter parking. The county sought state funding for the garage starting in 2012, but the extent and status of funding was never clear, nor was the final cost of the garage. Silber said that Minor League Baseball required the team to be out of Pfitzner Stadium by the end of the 2018 season. The team opposed attempts to put the deal on the November 2017 general election ballot, saying that would delay the deal for too long.

On July 13, 2017, the Nationals withdrew the proposal for the new stadium in Woodbridge after it was clear it did not have the votes to pass. Silber indicated that the team could be sold to buyers outside the Northern Virginia area, but that he preferred to keep it local if possible. Potential locations included the cities of Alexandria (former home of the team when they were the Alexandria Dukes) and Fredericksburg, as well as Loudoun, Spotsylvania, and Fairfax counties. Maryland and Arlington County were ruled out as possibilities, and Silber indicated it was unlikely the team would find another site in Prince William, either. Alexandria indicated it wasn't interested in February 2018.

In January 2018, Silber announced an extension of the team's lease at Pfitzner Stadium through 2020, still needing Minor League Baseball to approve playing there past the end of the 2018 season. Silber remained interested in moving the team and building a new stadium, in Northern Virginia—including Prince William County—or another nearby locality, but said he was not pursuing a sale.

=== Move to Fredericksburg ===
Silber announced in June 2018 that he had signed a letter of intent to build a new stadium in Fredericksburg, Virginia, that would open in April 2020. The 5,000-seat multi-purpose stadium will include a 300-seat club facility and 13 suites. In November 2018 the Fredericksburg city council unanimously gave final approval for the Silber family to finance, build and maintain the $35 million stadium with the city as an "anchor tenant" making an annual payment to the club of $1.05 million for 30 years.

The Potomac Nationals played their last regular season game at Pfitzner Stadium on August 29, 2019. On October 5, 2019, the team announced that it had changed its name to the Fredericksburg Nationals for the 2020 season and that its marketing nickname for the team – "P-Nats" when the team was the Potomac Nationals – would change to "FredNats." Because minor league baseball for 2020 was cancelled due to the COVID-19 pandemic, the Fredericksburg Nationals played their first game on May 4, 2021.

== Playoffs ==
- 1989 season: Defeated Lynchburg, 2–1, in semifinals; defeated Durham, 3–1 to win championship.
- 1991 season: Lost to Lynchburg, 2–0, in semifinals.
- 1995 season: Lost to Wilmington, 2–0, in semifinals.
- 2004 season: Lost to Wilmington, 2–1, in semifinals.
- 2008 season: Defeated Wilmington, 3–0, in semifinals; defeated Myrtle Beach, 3–1 to win championship.
- 2010 season: Defeated Frederick, 3–1, in semifinals; defeated Winston-Salem, 3–1 to win championship.
- 2011 season: Lost to Frederick, 3–2, in semifinals.
- 2013 season: Defeated Lynchburg, 2–0, in semifinals; lost to Salem, 3–0 in finals.
- 2014 season: Defeated Lynchburg, 2–0, in semifinals; defeated Myrtle Beach, 3–1 to win championship.
- 2016 season: Lost to Lynchburg 2–1 in semifinals.
- 2018 season: Defeated Lynchburg, 3–2, in semifinals; lost to Buies Creek, 1–0 in finals.

== Notable alumni ==
Notable alumni of the Mariners/Pirates/Yankees/Cannons/Nationals include:

- Rick Ankiel
- Brad Ausmus
- Rafael Bautista
- Barry Bonds
- Carmen Cali
- Mike Cameron
- Coco Crisp
- Ian Desmond
- Ross Detwiler
- Sean Doolittle
- Edwin Encarnación
- Danny Espinosa
- Félix Fermín
- Gio González
- Bryce Harper
- Dan Haren
- Sterling Hitchcock
- Scott Kamieniecki
- Jeff King
- John Lannan
- José Lind
- Braden Looper
- Kevin Maas
- Justin Maxwell
- Hensley Meulens
- Alan Mills
- Magglio Ordóñez
- R. C. Orlan
- Andy Pettitte
- Jorge Posada
- Albert Pujols
- Anthony Rendon
- Víctor Robles
- Iván Rodríguez
- Francisco Rodríguez (Venezuelan pitcher)
- John Smiley
- Juan Soto
- Stephen Strasburg
- Michael A. Taylor
- Trea Turner
- Joey Votto
- Jayson Werth
- Josh Whitesell
- Bernie Williams
- Gerald Williams
- Jack Wilson
- Dmitri Young
- Ryan Zimmerman
- Jordan Zimmermann
