= 1999 Carolina League season =

- League: Carolina League
- Sport: Baseball
- Duration: April 8 – September 5
- Number of games: 140
- Number of teams: 8

Regular season
- Season MVP: Marcus Giles, Myrtle Beach Pelicans

Playoffs
- League champions: Myrtle Beach Pelicans; Wilmington Blue Rocks

CL seasons
- ← 1998 2000 →

The 1999 Carolina League was a Class A-Advanced baseball season played between April 8 and September 5. Eight teams played a 140-game schedule, with the winners of each half of the season competing in the playoffs.

The Myrtle Beach Pelicans and Wilmington Blue Rocks were co-champions of the Carolina League this season.

== Team changes ==
- The Danville 97s relocated to Myrtle Beach, South Carolina and were renamed the Myrtle Beach Pelicans. The club remained affiliated with the Atlanta Braves.
- The Prince William Cannons were renamed the Potomac Cannons. The club remained affiliated with the St. Louis Cardinals.

== Teams ==
1999 Carolina League
Division	Team	City	MLB Affiliate	Stadium
North	Frederick Keys	Frederick, Maryland	Baltimore Orioles	Harry Grove Stadium
North	Lynchburg Hillcats	Lynchburg, Virginia	Pittsburgh Pirates	City Stadium
North	Potomac Cannons	Woodbridge, Virginia	St. Louis Cardinals	G. Richard Pfitzner Stadium
North	Wilmington Blue Rocks	Wilmington, Delaware	Kansas City Royals	Daniel S. Frawley Stadium
South	Kinston Indians	Kinston, North Carolina	Cleveland Indians	Grainger Stadium
South	Myrtle Beach Pelicans	Myrtle Beach, South Carolina	Atlanta Braves	Coastal Federal Field
South	Salem Avalanche	Salem, Virginia	Colorado Rockies	Salem Memorial Ballpark
South	Winston-Salem Warthogs	Winston-Salem, North Carolina	Chicago White Sox	Ernie Shore Field

== Map of teams ==
North division South division

== Regular season ==
=== Summary ===
- The Kinston Indians finished with the best record in the league for the first time since 1997.

=== Standings ===
North division
Team	Win	Loss	%	GB
Wilmington Blue Rocks	77	61	.558	–
Frederick Keys	67	71	.486	10
Lynchburg Hillcats	64	73	.467	12.5
Potomac Cannons	54	85	.388	23.5
South division
Kinston Indians	79	58	.577	–
Myrtle Beach Pelicans	79	60	.568	1
Salem Avalanche	69	69	.500	10.5
Winston-Salem Warthogs	63	75	.457	16.5

== League Leaders ==
=== Batting leaders ===
Stat	Player	Total
AVG	Marcus Giles, Myrtle Beach Pelicans	.326
H	Marcus Giles, Myrtle Beach Pelicans	162
R	Eddy Furniss, Lynchburg Hillcats; Aaron Rowand, Winston-Salem Warthogs	96
2B	Marcus Giles, Myrtle Beach Pelicans	40
3B	Jason Ross, Myrtle Beach Pelicans	13
HR	Andy Bevins, Potomac Cannons	25
RBI	Andy Bevins, Potomac Cannons	97
SB	Scott Pratt, Kinston Indians	47

=== Pitching leaders ===
Stat	Player	Total
W	Tim Drew, Kinston Indians	13
ERA	Josh Kalinowski, Salem Avalanche	2.11
CG	Rick Bauer, Frederick Keys; Sam McConnell, Lynchburg Hillcats	4
SV	Travis Thompson, Salem Avalanche	27
SO	Josh Kalinowski, Salem Avalanche	176
IP	Ryan Price, Salem Avalanche	171.2

== Playoffs ==
- The Myrtle Beach Pelicans and Wilmington Blue Rocks won named co-champions of the league as Hurricane Floyd canceled the fifth and deciding game of the series.
- The championship was the first for the Myrtle Beach Pelicans and the fourth for the Wilmington Blue Rocks.

=== Playoff bracket ===
Semi-finals
N1	Wilmington	bye
S1	Kinston	1
S2	Myrtle Beach	2

Finals
N1	Wilmington	2
S2	Myrtle Beach	2

== Awards ==
Carolina League awards
Award name	Recipient
Most Valuable Player	Marcus Giles, Myrtle Beach Pelicans
Pitcher of the Year	Josh Kalinowski, Salem Avalanche
Manager of the Year	Eric Wedge, Kinston Indians

== See also ==
- 1999 Major League Baseball season
