= 1998 Carolina League season =

- League: Carolina League
- Sport: Baseball
- Duration: April 2 – August 30
- Number of games: 140
- Number of teams: 8

Regular season
- Season MVP: Joe Crede, Winston-Salem Warthogs

Playoffs
- League champions: Wilmington Blue Rocks
- Runners-up: Winston-Salem Warthogs

CL seasons
- ← 1997 1999 →

The 1998 Carolina League was a Class A-Advanced baseball season played between April 2 and August 30. Eight teams played a 140-game schedule, with the winners of each half of the season competing in the playoffs.

The Wilmington Blue Rocks won the Carolina League championship, defeating the Winston-Salem Warthogs in the final round of the playoffs.

== Team changes ==
- The Durham Bulls relocated to Danville, Virginia and were renamed the Danville 97s. The club remained affiliated with the Atlanta Braves.

== Teams ==
1998 Carolina League
Division	Team	City	MLB Affiliate	Stadium
Northern	Frederick Keys	Frederick, Maryland	Baltimore Orioles	Harry Grove Stadium
Northern	Lynchburg Hillcats	Lynchburg, Virginia	Pittsburgh Pirates	City Stadium
Northern	Prince William Cannons	Woodbridge, Virginia	St. Louis Cardinals	G. Richard Pfitzner Stadium
Northern	Wilmington Blue Rocks	Wilmington, Delaware	Kansas City Royals	Daniel S. Frawley Stadium
Southern	Danville 97s	Danville, Virginia	Atlanta Braves	American Legion Field
Southern	Kinston Indians	Kinston, North Carolina	Cleveland Indians	Grainger Stadium
Southern	Salem Avalanche	Salem, Virginia	Colorado Rockies	Salem Memorial Ballpark
Southern	Winston-Salem Warthogs	Winston-Salem, North Carolina	Chicago White Sox	Ernie Shore Field

== Map of teams ==
Northern division Southern division

== Regular season ==
=== Summary ===
- The Wilmington Blue Rocks finished with the best record in the league for the first time since 1996.

=== Standings ===
Northern division
Team	Win	Loss	%	GB
Wilmington Blue Rocks	86	54	.614	–
Prince William Cannons	72	67	.518	13.5
Lynchburg Hillcats	69	71	.493	17
Frederick Keys	64	76	.457	22
Southern division
Winston-Salem Warthogs	79	60	.568	–
Kinston Indians	69	71	.493	10.5
Salem Avalanche	62	78	.443	17.5
Danville 97s	58	82	.414	21.5

== League Leaders ==
=== Batting leaders ===
Stat	Player	Total
AVG	Joe Crede, Winston-Salem Warthogs	.315
H	Cordell Farley, Prince William Cannons	159
R	Joe Crede, Winston-Salem Warthogs; Cordell Farley, Prince William Cannons	92
2B	Rod Bair, Salem Avalanche	42
3B	Juan Sosa, Salem Avalanche	12
HR	Mike Glavine, Kinston Indians	22
RBI	Joe Crede, Winston-Salem Warthogs	88
SB	Juan Sosa, Salem Avalanche	64

=== Pitching leaders ===
Stat	Player	Total
W	Jake Chapman, Wilmington Blue Rocks; Luis Colmenares, Salem Avalanche; Mario Iglesias, Winston-Salem Warthogs; Aaron Lineweaver, Wilmington Blue Rocks	13
ERA	Jason Karnuth, Prince William Cannons	1.67
CG	Chandler Martin, Salem Avalanche	7
SV	José De León, Prince William Cannons	26
SO	Rob Bell, Danville 97s	197
IP	Rob Bell, Danville 97s	178.1

== Playoffs ==
- The Wilmington Blue Rocks won their third Carolina League championship, defeating the Winston-Salem Warthogs in four games.

=== Playoff bracket ===
Finals
N1	Wilmington	3
S1	Winston-Salem	1

== Awards ==
Carolina League awards
Award name	Recipient
Most Valuable Player	Joe Crede, Winston-Salem Warthogs
Pitcher of the Year	Rick Ankiel, Prince William Cannons
Manager of the Year	Chris Cron, Winston-Salem Warthogs

== See also ==
- 1998 Major League Baseball season
