= 1990 Carolina League season =

- League: Carolina League
- Sport: Baseball
- Duration: April 12 – September 2
- Number of games: 140
- Number of teams: 8

Regular season
- Season MVP: Gary Scott, Winston-Salem Spirits

Playoffs
- League champions: Frederick Keys
- Runners-up: Kinston Indians

CL seasons
- ← 1989 1991 →

The 1990 Carolina League was a Class A-Advanced baseball season played between April 12 and September 2. Eight teams played a 140-game schedule, with the winners of each half of the season competing in the playoffs.

The Frederick Keys won the Carolina League championship, defeating the Kinston Indians in the final round of the playoffs.

== League changes ==
- The Carolina League was reclassified from Class A to Class A-Advanced beginning in the 1990 season.

== Team changes ==
- The Peninsula Pilots began an affiliation with the Seattle Mariners.

== Teams ==
1990 Carolina League
Division	Team	City	MLB Affiliate	Stadium
North	Frederick Keys	Frederick, Maryland	Baltimore Orioles	Harry Grove Stadium
North	Lynchburg Red Sox	Lynchburg, Virginia	Boston Red Sox	City Stadium
North	Prince William Cannons	Woodbridge, Virginia	New York Yankees	Prince William County Stadium
North	Salem Buccaneers	Salem, Virginia	Pittsburgh Pirates	Salem Municipal Field
South	Durham Bulls	Durham, North Carolina	Atlanta Braves	Durham Athletic Park
South	Kinston Indians	Kinston, North Carolina	Cleveland Indians	Grainger Stadium
South	Peninsula Pilots	Hampton, Virginia	Seattle Mariners	War Memorial Stadium
South	Winston-Salem Spirits	Winston-Salem, North Carolina	Chicago Cubs	Ernie Shore Field

== Map of teams ==
North division South division

== Regular season ==
=== Summary ===
- The Kinston Indians finished with the best record in the league for the first time since 1988.

=== Standings ===
North division
Team	Win	Loss	%	GB
Frederick Keys	74	62	.544	–
Prince William Cannons	64	75	.460	11.5
Lynchburg Red Sox	58	80	.420	17
Salem Buccaneers	55	84	.396	20.5
South division
Kinston Indians	88	47	.652	–
Winston-Salem Spirits	86	54	.614	4.5
Durham Bulls	71	68	.511	19
Peninsula Pilots	57	83	.407	33.5

== League Leaders ==
=== Batting leaders ===
Stat	Player	Total
AVG	Ken Ramos, Kinston Indians	.345
H	Bruce Schreiber, Salem Buccaneers	160
R	Greg Sims, Salem Buccaneers	91
2B	Russ Davis, Prince William Cannons	37
3B	Fabio Gomez, Kinston Indians; Tim Hines, Salem Buccaneers	8
HR	Greg Blosser, Lynchburg Red Sox	18
RBI	Mandy Romero, Salem Buccaneers	90
SB	Fernando Ramsey, Winston-Salem Spirits	43

=== Pitching leaders ===
Stat	Player	Total
W	Frank Seminara, Prince William Cannons	16
ERA	Frank Seminara, Prince William Cannons	1.90
CG	Brian Conroy, Lynchburg Red Sox	8
SV	Mike Gardella, Prince William Cannons	30
SO	Mike Oquist, Frederick Keys	170
IP	Tim Wakefield, Salem Buccaneers	190.1

== Playoffs ==
- The Frederick Keys won their first Carolina League championship, defeating the Kinston Indians in five games.

=== Playoff bracket ===
Finals
N1	Frederick	3
S1	Kinston	2

== Awards ==
Carolina League awards
Award name	Recipient
Most Valuable Player	Gary Scott, Winston-Salem Spirits
Pitcher of the Year	Frank Seminara, Prince William Cannons
Manager of the Year	Wally Moon, Frederick Keys

== See also ==
- 1990 Major League Baseball season
