= 1995 Carolina League season =

- League: Carolina League
- Sport: Baseball
- Duration: April 6 – September 2
- Number of games: 140
- Number of teams: 8

Regular season
- Season MVP: Richie Sexson, Kinston Indians

Playoffs
- League champions: Kinston Indians
- Runners-up: Wilmington Blue Rocks

CL seasons
- ← 1994 1996 →

The 1995 Carolina League was a Class A-Advanced baseball season played between April 6 and September 2. Eight teams played a 140-game schedule, with the winners of each half of the season competing in the playoffs.

The Kinston Indians won the Carolina League championship, defeating the Wilmington Blue Rocks in the final round of the playoffs.

== Team changes ==
- The Salem Buccaneers ended their affiliation with the Pittsburgh Pirates and began a new affiliation with the Colorado Rockies. The club was renamed the Salem Avalanche.
- The Lynchburg Red Sox ended their affiliation with the Boston Red Sox and began a new affiliation with the Pittsburgh Pirates. The club was renamed the Lynchburg Hillcats.
- The Winston-Salem Spirits are renamed the Winston-Salem Warthogs. The club remained affiliated with the Cincinnati Reds.

== Teams ==
1995 Carolina League
Division	Team	City	MLB Affiliate	Stadium
Northern	Frederick Keys	Frederick, Maryland	Baltimore Orioles	Harry Grove Stadium
Northern	Lynchburg Hillcats	Lynchburg, Virginia	Pittsburgh Pirates	City Stadium
Northern	Prince William Cannons	Woodbridge, Virginia	Chicago White Sox	Prince William County Stadium
Northern	Wilmington Blue Rocks	Wilmington, Delaware	Kansas City Royals	Daniel S. Frawley Stadium
Southern	Durham Bulls	Durham, North Carolina	Atlanta Braves	Durham Bulls Athletic Park
Southern	Kinston Indians	Kinston, North Carolina	Cleveland Indians	Grainger Stadium
Southern	Salem Avalanche	Salem, Virginia	Colorado Rockies	Salem Municipal Field; Salem Memorial Ballpark
Southern	Winston-Salem Warthogs	Winston-Salem, North Carolina	Cincinnati Reds	Ernie Shore Field

== Map of teams ==
Northern division Southern division

== Regular season ==
=== Summary ===
- The Wilmington Blue Rocks finished with the best record in the league for the second consecutive season.

=== Standings ===
Northern division
Team	Win	Loss	%	GB
Wilmington Blue Rocks	83	55	.601	–
Lynchburg Hillcats	67	71	.486	16
Prince William Cannons	64	76	.457	20
Frederick Keys	58	79	.423	24.5
Southern division
Kinston Indians	81	56	.591	–
Winston-Salem Warthogs	69	68	.504	12
Salem Avalanche	68	72	.486	14.5
Durham Bulls	63	76	.453	19

== League Leaders ==
=== Batting leaders ===
Stat	Player	Total
AVG	Mike Sweeney, Wilmington Blue Rocks	.310
H	Richie Sexson, Kinston Indians	151
R	Chris Sexton, Salem / Winston-Salem	84
2B	Richie Sexson, Kinston Indians	34
3B	Donnie Delaney, Wilmington Blue Rocks; Ricky Gutierrez, Kinston Indians; Enrique Wilson, Kinston Indians	7
HR	Juan Thomas, Prince William Cannons	26
RBI	Richie Sexson, Kinston Indians	85
SB	Ricky Gutierrez, Kinston Indians	43

=== Pitching leaders ===
Stat	Player	Total
W	Glendon Rusch, Wilmington Blue Rocks	14
ERA	Glendon Rusch, Wilmington Blue Rocks	1.74
CG	Jay Vaught, Kinston Indians	4
SV	Matt Byrd, Durham Bulls	27
SO	Bartolo Colón, Kinston Indians	152
IP	Jamey Wright, Salem Avalanche; Jay Vaught, Kinston Indians	171.0

== Playoffs ==
- The Kinston Indians won their third Carolina League championship, defeating the Wilmington Blue Rocks in three games.

=== Playoff bracket ===
Semi-finals
N1	Wilmington	2
N2	Prince William	0
S1	Kinston	bye

Finals
N1	Wilmington	0
S1	Kinston	3

== Awards ==
Carolina League awards
Award name	Recipient
Most Valuable Player	Richie Sexson, Kinston Indians
Pitcher of the Year	Bartolo Colón, Kinston Indians
Manager of the Year	John Mizerock, Wilmington Blue Rocks

== See also ==
- 1995 Major League Baseball season
