= 2004 ACC tournament =

2004 ACC tournament may refer to:

- 2004 ACC men's basketball tournament
- 2004 ACC women's basketball tournament
- 2004 ACC men's soccer tournament
- 2004 ACC women's soccer tournament
- 2004 Atlantic Coast Conference baseball tournament
- 2004 Atlantic Coast Conference softball tournament
