= 1997 Carolina League season =

- League: Carolina League
- Sport: Baseball
- Duration: April 4 – August 30
- Number of games: 140
- Number of teams: 8

Regular season
- Season MVP: Aramis Ramírez, Lynchburg Hillcats

Playoffs
- League champions: Lynchburg Hillcats
- Runners-up: Kinston Indians

CL seasons
- ← 1996 1998 →

The 1997 Carolina League was a Class A-Advanced baseball season played between April 4 and August 30. Eight teams played a 140-game schedule, with the winners of each half of the season competing in the playoffs.

The Lynchburg Hillcats won the Carolina League championship, defeating the Kinston Indians in the final round of the playoffs.

== Team changes ==
- The Prince William Cannons ended their affiliation with the Chicago White Sox and began a new affiliation with the St. Louis Cardinals.
- The Winston-Salem Warthogs ended their affiliation with the Cincinnati Reds and began a new affiliation with the Chicago White Sox.

== Teams ==
1997 Carolina League
Division	Team	City	MLB Affiliate	Stadium
Northern	Frederick Keys	Frederick, Maryland	Baltimore Orioles	Harry Grove Stadium
Northern	Lynchburg Hillcats	Lynchburg, Virginia	Pittsburgh Pirates	City Stadium
Northern	Prince William Cannons	Woodbridge, Virginia	St. Louis Cardinals	G. Richard Pfitzner Stadium
Northern	Wilmington Blue Rocks	Wilmington, Delaware	Kansas City Royals	Daniel S. Frawley Stadium
Southern	Durham Bulls	Durham, North Carolina	Atlanta Braves	Durham Bulls Athletic Park
Southern	Kinston Indians	Kinston, North Carolina	Cleveland Indians	Grainger Stadium
Southern	Salem Avalanche	Salem, Virginia	Colorado Rockies	Salem Memorial Ballpark
Southern	Winston-Salem Warthogs	Winston-Salem, North Carolina	Chicago White Sox	Ernie Shore Field

== Map of teams ==
Northern division Southern division

== Regular season ==
=== Summary ===
- The Kinston Indians finished with the best record in the league for the first time since 1991.

=== Standings ===
Northern division
Team	Win	Loss	%	GB
Lynchburg Hillcats	82	58	.586	–
Prince William Cannons	69	70	.496	12.5
Frederick Keys	69	71	.493	13
Wilmington Blue Rocks	62	78	.443	20
Southern division
Kinston Indians	87	53	.621	–
Salem Avalanche	63	75	.457	23
Durham Bulls	63	76	.453	23.5
Winston-Salem Warthogs	63	77	.450	24

== League Leaders ==
=== Batting leaders ===
Stat	Player	Total
AVG	Rick Short, Frederick Keys	.319
H	Carlos Lee, Winston-Salem Warthogs	173
R	Scott Morgan, Kinston Indians	86
2B	Carlos Lee, Winston-Salem Warthogs	50
3B	Ramon Gomez, Winston-Salem Warthogs	12
HR	Danny Peoples, Kinston Indians	34
RBI	Aramis Ramírez, Lynchburg Hillcats	114
SB	Ramon Gomez, Winston-Salem Warthogs	53

=== Pitching leaders ===
Stat	Player	Total
W	Bronson Arroyo, Lynchburg Hillcats; Clint Weibl, Prince William Cannons	12
ERA	Cliff Politte, Prince William Cannons	2.24
CG	Tom Stepka, Salem Avalanche	4
SV	Armando Almanza, Prince William Cannons	36
SO	Carlos Chantres, Winston-Salem Warthogs	158
IP	Top Stepka, Salem Avalanche	182.1

== Playoffs ==
- The Lynchburg Hillcats won their fourth Carolina League championship, defeating the Kinston Indians in four games.

=== Playoff bracket ===
Semi-finals
N1	Lynchburg	2
N2	Frederick	0
S1	Kinston	bye

Finals
N1	Lynchburg	3
S1	Kinston	1

== Awards ==
Carolina League awards
Award name	Recipient
Most Valuable Player	Aramis Ramírez, Lynchburg Hillcats
Pitcher of the Year	Cliff Politte, Prince William Cannons
Manager of the Year	Joel Skinner, Kinston Indians

== See also ==
- 1997 Major League Baseball season
