= 2003 ACC tournament =

2003 ACC tournament may refer to:

- 2003 ACC men's basketball tournament
- 2003 ACC women's basketball tournament
- 2003 ACC men's soccer tournament
- 2003 ACC women's soccer tournament
- 2003 Atlantic Coast Conference baseball tournament
- 2003 Atlantic Coast Conference softball tournament
