= 2000 Carolina League season =

- League: Carolina League
- Sport: Baseball
- Duration: April 6 – September 3
- Number of games: 140
- Number of teams: 8

Regular season
- Season MVP: Troy Farnsworth, Potomac Cannons

Playoffs
- League champions: Myrtle Beach Pelicans
- Runners-up: Lynchburg Hillcats

CL seasons
- ← 1999 2001 →

The 2000 Carolina League was a Class A-Advanced baseball season played between April 6 and September 3. Eight teams played a 140-game schedule, with the winners of each half of the season competing in the playoffs.

The Myrtle Beach Pelicans won the Carolina League championship, defeating the Lynchburg Hillcats in the final round of the playoffs.

== Teams ==
2000 Carolina League
Division	Team	City	MLB Affiliate	Stadium
North	Frederick Keys	Frederick, Maryland	Baltimore Orioles	Harry Grove Stadium
North	Lynchburg Hillcats	Lynchburg, Virginia	Pittsburgh Pirates	City Stadium
North	Potomac Cannons	Woodbridge, Virginia	St. Louis Cardinals	G. Richard Pfitzner Stadium
North	Wilmington Blue Rocks	Wilmington, Delaware	Kansas City Royals	Daniel S. Frawley Stadium
South	Kinston Indians	Kinston, North Carolina	Cleveland Indians	Grainger Stadium
South	Myrtle Beach Pelicans	Myrtle Beach, South Carolina	Atlanta Braves	Coastal Federal Field
South	Salem Avalanche	Salem, Virginia	Colorado Rockies	Salem Memorial Ballpark
South	Winston-Salem Warthogs	Winston-Salem, North Carolina	Chicago White Sox	Ernie Shore Field

== Map of teams ==
North division South division

== Regular season ==
=== Summary ===
- The Myrtle Beach Pelicans finished with the best record in the league for the first time in team history.

=== Standings ===
North division
Team	Win	Loss	%	GB
Frederick Keys	66	71	.482	–
Lynchburg Hillcats	66	72	.478	0.5
Wilmington Blue Rocks	63	76	.453	4
Potomac Cannons	62	76	.449	4.5
South division
Myrtle Beach Pelicans	88	52	.629	–
Salem Avalanche	73	67	.521	15
Kinston Indians	68	69	.496	18.5
Winston-Salem Warthogs	68	71	.489	19.5

== League Leaders ==
=== Batting leaders ===
Stat	Player	Total
AVG	Víctor Rodríguez, Kinston Indians	.327
H	Mark Ellis, Wilmington Blue Rocks	146
R	Chone Figgins, Salem Avalanche	92
2B	Kevin Burford, Salem Avalanche	40
3B	Chone Figgins, Salem Avalanche	14
HR	Troy Farnsworth, Potomac Cannons	23
RBI	Troy Farnsworth, Potomac Cannons	113
SB	Esix Snead, Potomac Cannons	108

=== Pitching leaders ===
Stat	Player	Total
W	Christian Parra, Myrtle Beach Pelicans	17
ERA	Corey Thurman, Wilmington Blue Rocks	2.26
CG	Geronimo Mendoza, Winston-Salem Warthogs	4
SV	Jason Marr, Potomac Cannons	30
SO	Ryan Cameron, Salem Avalanche	168
IP	Chuck Crowder, Salem Avalanche	168.2

== Playoffs ==
- The Myrtle Beach Pelicans won their second Carolina League championship, defeating the Lynchburg Hillcats in three games.

=== Playoff bracket ===
Semi-finals
N1	Frederick	0
N2	Lynchburg	2
S1	Myrtle Beach	bye

Finals
N2	Lynchburg	0
S1	Myrtle Beach	3

== Awards ==
Carolina League awards
Award name	Recipient
Most Valuable Player	Troy Farnsworth, Potomac Cannons
Pitcher of the Year	Christian Parra, Myrtle Beach Pelicans
Manager of the Year	Brian Snitker, Myrtle Beach Pelicans

== See also ==
- 2000 Major League Baseball season
