= 1996 Carolina League season =

- League: Carolina League
- Sport: Baseball
- Duration: April 5 – September 2
- Number of games: 140
- Number of teams: 8

Regular season
- Season MVP: José Guillén, Lynchburg Hillcats

Playoffs
- League champions: Wilmington Blue Rocks
- Runners-up: Kinston Indians

CL seasons
- ← 1995 1997 →

The 1996 Carolina League was a Class A-Advanced baseball season that took place from April 5 to September 2. Eight teams participated in a 140-game schedule, with the winners of each half of the season competing in the playoffs.

The Wilmington Blue Rocks won the Carolina League championship, defeating the Kinston Indians in the final round of the playoffs.

== Teams ==
1996 Carolina League
Division	Team	City	MLB Affiliate	Stadium
Northern	Frederick Keys	Frederick, Maryland	Baltimore Orioles	Harry Grove Stadium
Northern	Lynchburg Hillcats	Lynchburg, Virginia	Pittsburgh Pirates	City Stadium
Northern	Prince William Cannons	Woodbridge, Virginia	Chicago White Sox	G. Richard Pfitzner Stadium
Northern	Wilmington Blue Rocks	Wilmington, Delaware	Kansas City Royals	Daniel S. Frawley Stadium
Southern	Durham Bulls	Durham, North Carolina	Atlanta Braves	Durham Bulls Athletic Park
Southern	Kinston Indians	Kinston, North Carolina	Cleveland Indians	Grainger Stadium
Southern	Salem Avalanche	Salem, Virginia	Colorado Rockies	Salem Memorial Ballpark
Southern	Winston-Salem Warthogs	Winston-Salem, North Carolina	Cincinnati Reds	Ernie Shore Field

== Map of teams ==
Northern division Southern division

== Regular season ==
=== Summary ===
- The Wilmington Blue Rocks finished with the best record in the league for the third consecutive season.

=== Standings ===
Northern division
Team	Win	Loss	%	GB
Wilmington Blue Rocks	80	60	.571	–
Frederick Keys	67	72	.482	12.5
Lynchburg Hillcats	65	74	.468	14.5
Prince William Cannons	58	80	.420	21
Southern division
Kinston Indians	76	62	.551	–
Winston-Salem Warthogs	74	65	.532	2.5
Durham Bulls	73	66	.525	3.5
Salem Avalanche	62	76	.449	14

== League Leaders ==
=== Batting leaders ===
Stat	Player	Total
AVG	Sean Casey, Kinston Indians	.331
H	José Guillén, Lynchburg Hillcats	170
R	Juan Thomas, Prince William Cannons	88
2B	Freddy García, Lynchburg Hillcats	39
3B	Chip Glass, Kinston Indians	9
HR	Freddy García, Lynchburg Hillcats; José Guillén, Lynchburg Hillcats	21
RBI	Johnny Isom, Frederick Keys	104
SB	Sergio Nunez, Wilmington Blue Rocks	44

=== Pitching leaders ===
Stat	Player	Total
W	David Caldwell, Kinston Indians	13
ERA	Nerio Rodríguez, Frederick Keys	2.26
CG	Carlos Castillo, Prince William Cannons; Allen Halley, Prince William Cannons; Kevin Pickford, Lynchburg Hillcats	4
SV	Steve Prihoda, Wilmington Blue Rocks	25
SO	Russ Herbert, Prince William Cannons	148
IP	Kevin Pickford, Lynchburg Hillcats	172.1

== Playoffs ==
- The Wilmington Blue Rocks won their second Carolina League championship, defeating the Kinston Indians in four games.

=== Playoff bracket ===
Semi-finals
N1	Wilmington	bye
S1	Kinston	2
S2	Durham	1

Finals
N1	Wilmington	3
S1	Kinston	1

== Awards ==
Carolina League awards
Award name	Recipient
Most Valuable Player	José Guillén, Lynchburg Hillcats
Pitcher of the Year	Noe Najera, Kinston Indians
Manager of the Year	Jack Mull, Kinston Indians

== See also ==
- 1996 Major League Baseball season
