= 1992 Carolina League season =

- League: Carolina League
- Sport: Baseball
- Duration: April 9 – September 1
- Number of games: 140
- Number of teams: 8

Regular season
- Season MVP: Bubba Smith, Peninsula Pilots

Playoffs
- League champions: Peninsula Pilots
- Runners-up: Lynchburg Red Sox

CL seasons
- ← 1991 1993 →

The 1992 Carolina League was a Class A-Advanced baseball season played between April 9 and September 1. Eight teams played a 140-game schedule, with the winners of each half of the season competing in the playoffs.

The Peninsula Pilots won the Carolina League championship, defeating the Lynchburg Red Sox in the final round of the playoffs.

== Teams ==
1992 Carolina League
Division	Team	City	MLB Affiliate	Stadium
Northern	Frederick Keys	Frederick, Maryland	Baltimore Orioles	Harry Grove Stadium
Northern	Lynchburg Red Sox	Lynchburg, Virginia	Boston Red Sox	City Stadium
Northern	Prince William Cannons	Woodbridge, Virginia	New York Yankees	Prince William County Stadium
Northern	Salem Buccaneers	Salem, Virginia	Pittsburgh Pirates	Salem Municipal Field
Southern	Durham Bulls	Durham, North Carolina	Atlanta Braves	Durham Athletic Park
Southern	Kinston Indians	Kinston, North Carolina	Cleveland Indians	Grainger Stadium
Southern	Peninsula Pilots	Hampton, Virginia	Seattle Mariners	War Memorial Stadium
Southern	Winston-Salem Spirits	Winston-Salem, North Carolina	Chicago Cubs	Ernie Shore Field

== Map of teams ==
Northern division Southern division

== Regular season ==
=== Summary ===
- The Lynchburg Red Sox finished with the best record in the league for the first time since 1985.
- The Peninsula Pilots defeated the Durham Bulls in a one-game tie-breaker to determine the winner of the Southern division in the first half of the season.

=== Standings ===
Northern division
Team	Win	Loss	%	GB
Lynchburg Red Sox	77	58	.570	–
Frederick Keys	69	71	.493	10.5
Prince William Cannons	69	71	.493	10.5
Salem Buccaneers	64	76	.457	15.5
Southern division
Peninsula Pilots	74	64	.536	–
Durham Bulls	70	70	.500	5
Kinston Indians	65	71	.478	8
Winston-Salem Spirits	66	73	.475	8.5

== League Leaders ==
=== Batting leaders ===
Stat	Player	Total
AVG	Randy Kapano, Winston-Salem Spirits	.319
H	Ramón Martínez, Salem Buccaneers	154
R	Darren Bragg, Peninsula Pilots	83
2B	Jose Viera, Winston-Salem Spirits	32
3B	Ramón Martínez, Salem Buccaneers	12
HR	Bubba Smith, Peninsula Pilots	32
RBI	Andy Hartung, Winston-Salem Spirits	94
SB	Lee Heath, Durham Bulls	50

=== Pitching leaders ===
Stat	Player	Total
W	John Cummings, Peninsula Pilots	16
ERA	Joe Caruso, Lynchburg Red Sox	1.98
CG	Terry Farrar, Frederick Keys; Chad Ogea, Kinston Indians; Rick White, Salem Buccaneers	5
SV	Cory Bailey, Lynchburg Red Sox	23
SO	John Cummings, Peninsula Pilots	144
IP	Terry Farrar, Frederick Keys	182.1

== Playoffs ==
- The Peninsula Pilots won their fourth Carolina League championship, defeating the Lynchburg Red Sox in five games.

=== Playoff bracket ===
Finals
N1	Lynchburg	2
S1	Peninsula	3

== Awards ==
Carolina League awards
Award name	Recipient
Most Valuable Player	Bubba Smith, Peninsula Pilots
Pitcher of the Year	John Cummings, Peninsula Pilots
Manager of the Year	Marc Hill, Peninsula Pilots

== See also ==
- 1992 Major League Baseball season
