= 1988 Carolina League season =

- League: Carolina League
- Sport: Baseball
- Duration: April 8 – August 31
- Number of games: 140
- Number of teams: 8

Regular season
- Season MVP: Mickey Pina, Lynchburg Red Sox

Playoffs
- League champions: Kinston Indians
- Runners-up: Lynchburg Red Sox

CL seasons
- ← 1987 1989 →

The 1988 Carolina League was a Class A baseball season played between April 8 and August 31. Eight teams played a 140-game schedule, with the winners of each half of the season competing in the playoffs.

The Kinston Indians won the Carolina League championship, defeating the Lynchburg Red Sox in the final round of the playoffs.

== Team changes ==
- The Lynchburg Mets ended their affiliation with the New York Mets and began a new affiliation with the Boston Red Sox. The club was renamed the Lynchburg Red Sox.
- The Peninsula White Sox ended their affiliation with the Chicago White Sox. The club was renamed the Virginia Generals.

== Teams ==
1988 Carolina League
Division	Team	City	MLB Affiliate	Stadium
North	Hagerstown Suns	Hagerstown, Maryland	Baltimore Orioles	Municipal Stadium
North	Lynchburg Red Sox	Lynchburg, Virginia	Boston Red Sox	City Stadium
North	Prince William Yankees	Woodbridge, Virginia	New York Yankees	Prince William County Stadium
North	Salem Buccaneers	Salem, Virginia	Pittsburgh Pirates	Salem Municipal Field
South	Durham Bulls	Durham, North Carolina	Atlanta Braves	Durham Athletic Park
South	Kinston Indians	Kinston, North Carolina	Cleveland Indians	Grainger Stadium
South	Virginia Generals	Hampton, Virginia	None	War Memorial Stadium
South	Winston-Salem Spirits	Winston-Salem, North Carolina	Chicago Cubs	Ernie Shore Field

== Map of teams ==
North division South division

== Regular season ==
=== Summary ===
- The Kinston Indians finished with the best record in the league for the first time in team history.
- The Hagerstown Suns failed to qualify for the post-season despite finishing with the best record in the North Division, as the team did not finish in first place in either half of the season.

=== Standings ===
North division
Team	Win	Loss	%	GB
Hagerstown Suns	79	61	.564	–
Salem Buccaneers	73	66	.525	5.5
Lynchburg Red Sox	68	72	.486	11
Prince William Yankees	55	84	.396	23.5
South division
Kinston Indians	88	52	.629	–
Durham Bulls	82	58	.586	6
Winston-Salem Spirits	73	67	.521	15
Virginia Generals	41	99	.293	47

== League Leaders ==
=== Batting leaders ===
Stat	Player	Total
AVG	Bernie Williams, Prince William Yankees	.335
H	Scott Cooper, Lynchburg Red Sox; Derrick May, Winston-Salem Spirits	148
R	Don Buford, Hagerstown Suns; Jim Orsag, Lynchburg Red Sox; Mickey Pina, Lynchburg Red Sox	91
2B	Scott Cooper, Lynchburg Red Sox	45
3B	Derrick May, Winston-Salem Spirits	9
HR	Mickey Pina, Lynchburg Red Sox	21
RBI	Mickey Pina, Lynchburg Red Sox	108
SB	Don Buford, Hagerstown Suns	77

=== Pitching leaders ===
Stat	Player	Total
W	Brian DuBois, Virginia / Hagerstown; Phil Harrison, Winston-Salem Spirits; Mike Sander, Hagerstown Suns	14
ERA	Kevin Bearse, Kinston Indians	1.31
CG	Stacey Burdick, Hagerstown Suns; Brian DuBois, Virginia / Hagerstown; Scott Kamieniecki, Prince William Yankees; Bill Kazmierczak, Winston-Salem Spirits	7
SV	Kevin Bearse, Kinston Indians	22
SO	Phil Harrison, Winston-Salem Spirits	169
IP	Danny Weems, Durham Bulls	191.1

== Playoffs ==
- The Kinston Indians won their first Carolina League championship, defeating the Lynchburg Red Sox in five games.

=== Playoff bracket ===
Semi-finals
N1	Salem	0
N2	Lynchburg	2
S1	Kinston	bye

Finals
N2	Lynchburg	2
S1	Kinston	3

== Awards ==
Carolina League awards
Award name	Recipient
Most Valuable Player	Mickey Pina, Lynchburg Red Sox
Pitcher of the Year	Kevin Bearse, Kinston Indians; Kent Mercker, Durham Bulls
Manager of the Year	Dick Berardino, Lynchburg Red Sox

== See also ==
- 1988 Major League Baseball season
