= 1989 Carolina League season =

- League: Carolina League
- Sport: Baseball
- Duration: April 7 – August 30
- Number of games: 140
- Number of teams: 8

Regular season
- Season MVP: Phil Plantier, Lynchburg Red Sox

Playoffs
- League champions: Prince William Cannons
- Runners-up: Durham Bulls

CL seasons
- ← 1988 1990 →

The 1989 Carolina League was a Class A baseball season played between April 7 and August 30. Eight teams played a 140-game schedule, with the winners of each half of the season competing in the playoffs.

The Prince William Cannons won the Carolina League championship, defeating the Durham Bulls in the final round of the playoffs.

== Team changes ==
- The Hagerstown Suns relocated to Frederick, Maryland and were renamed the Frederick Keys. The club remained affiliated with the Baltimore Orioles.
- The Prince William Yankees were renamed the Prince William Cannons. The club remained affiliated with the New York Yankees.
- The Virginia Generals were renamed the Peninsula Pilots.

== Teams ==
1989 Carolina League
Division	Team	City	MLB Affiliate	Stadium
North	Frederick Keys	Frederick, Maryland	Baltimore Orioles	McCurdy Field
North	Lynchburg Red Sox	Lynchburg, Virginia	Boston Red Sox	City Stadium
North	Prince William Cannons	Woodbridge, Virginia	New York Yankees	Prince William County Stadium
North	Salem Buccaneers	Salem, Virginia	Pittsburgh Pirates	Salem Municipal Field
South	Durham Bulls	Durham, North Carolina	Atlanta Braves	Durham Athletic Park
South	Kinston Indians	Kinston, North Carolina	Cleveland Indians	Grainger Stadium
South	Peninsula Pilots	Hampton, Virginia	None	War Memorial Stadium
South	Winston-Salem Spirits	Winston-Salem, North Carolina	Chicago Cubs	Ernie Shore Field

== Map of teams ==
North division South division

== Regular season ==
=== Summary ===
- The Durham Bulls finished with the best record in the league for the first time since 1962.
- The Frederick Keys failed to qualify for the post-season despite finishing with the best record in the North Division, as the team did not finish in first place in either half of the season.

=== Standings ===
North division
Team	Win	Loss	%	GB
Frederick Keys	73	65	.529	–
Prince William Cannons	72	66	.522	1
Lynchburg Red Sox	70	66	.515	2
Salem Buccaneers	63	75	.457	10
South division
Durham Bulls	84	54	.609	–
Kinston Indians	76	60	.559	7
Winston-Salem Spirits	64	71	.474	18.5
Peninsula Pilots	44	89	.331	37.5

== League Leaders ==
=== Batting leaders ===
Stat	Player	Total
AVG	David Segui, Frederick Keys	.317
H	John Wehner, Salem Buccaneers	155
R	Al Martin, Durham Bulls	84
2B	Ken Pennington, Durham Bulls	34
3B	Pat Kelly, Prince William Cannons	7
HR	Phil Plantier, Lynchburg Red Sox	27
RBI	Phil Plantier, Lynchburg Red Sox	105
SB	Rod Lofton, Frederick Keys	62

=== Pitching leaders ===
Stat	Player	Total
W	Mike Draper, Prince William Cannons	14
ERA	Ray Mullino, Winston-Salem Spirits	2.32
CG	Mike Aspray, Winston-Salem Spirits	10
SV	Joe Ausanio, Salem Buccaneers	20
SO	Derek Livernois, Lynchburg Red Sox	151
IP	Mike Aspray, Winston-Salem Spirits	177.0

== Playoffs ==
- The Prince William Cannons won their first Carolina League championship, defeating the Durham Bulls in four games.

=== Playoff bracket ===
Semi-finals
N1	Prince William	2
N2	Lynchburg	1
S1	Durham	bye

Finals
N1	Prince William	3
S1	Durham	1

== Awards ==
Carolina League awards
Award name	Recipient
Most Valuable Player	Phil Plantier, Lynchburg Red Sox
Pitcher of the Year	Charles Nagy, Kinston Indians
Manager of the Year	Grady Little, Durham Bulls

== See also ==
- 1989 Major League Baseball season
