= Paul Runge (infielder) =

American baseball player (born 1958)

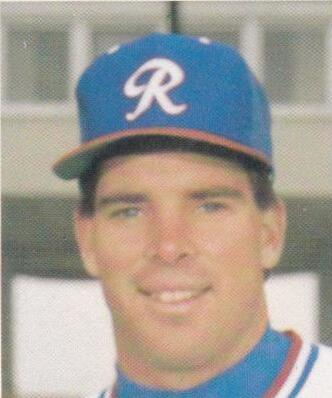
- Runge with the Richmond Braves c. 1987
- Infielder
- Born: May 21, 1958 (age 68); Kingston, New York, U.S.
- Batted: Right Threw: Right

MLB debut
- September 25, 1981, for the Atlanta Braves

Last MLB appearance
- September 12, 1988, for the Atlanta Braves

MLB statistics
- Batting average: .232
- Home runs: 4
- Runs batted in: 26
- Stats at Baseball Reference

Teams
- Atlanta Braves (1981–1988)

Paul William Runge (born May 21, 1958) is an American former professional baseball player. He played all or part of eight seasons in Major League Baseball for the Atlanta Braves from 1981 until 1988. He served as a manager of the Florida Fire Frogs, the Atlanta Braves' Class-A affiliate in the Florida State League.

== Early life ==
Runge graduated from Kingston High School in 1976.

== Baseball career ==
=== As a player ===
Runge was drafted by the Braves in the ninth round of the 1979 Major League Baseball draft and spent his entire major league career with them, playing parts of eight seasons in the majors. Runge was a utility infielder, splitting his time between third base, shortstop, and second base. Throughout those seasons, he never played in more than 52 games, nor did he come to bat more than 110 times.

=== As a coach ===
Since 1993, Runge has been a manager at various levels of the Braves organization. He has managed the Idaho Falls Braves in 1993, the Danville Braves in 1994, the Eugene Emeralds in 1995, the Macon Braves in 1996, the Durham Bulls in 1997, the Danville 97s in 1998, the Greenville Braves from 1999 through 2001, and then back to the Danville Braves from 2005 through 2010. In November 2010, it was announced that Runge would be managing the Rome Braves. However, he instead chose to leave the Braves organization to join the Astros.

== Sources ==
- Career statistics from Baseball Reference · Baseball Reference (Minors) · Retrosheet · Baseball Almanac
