= Jason Marquis =

American baseball pitcher (born 1978)

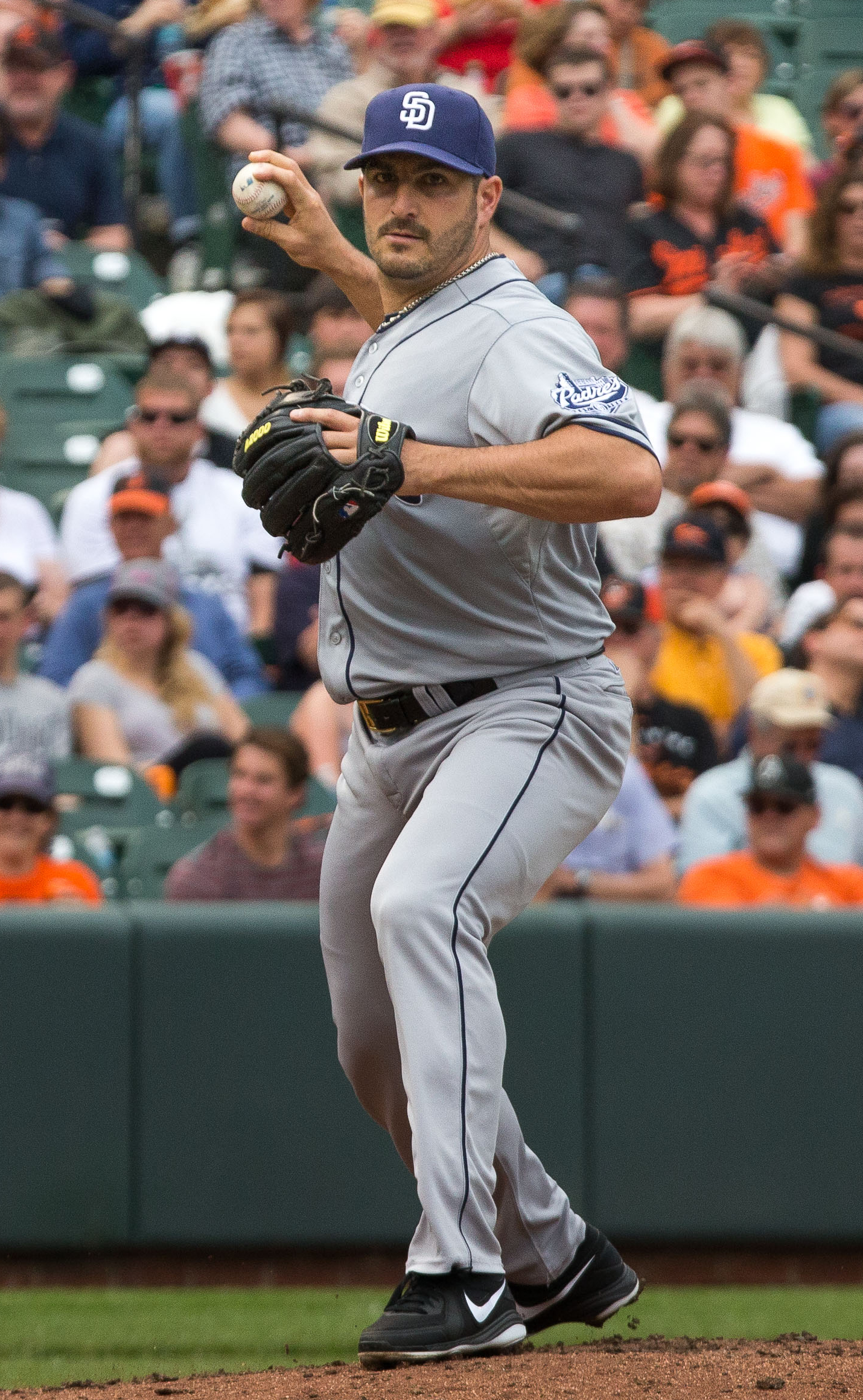
- Marquis with the San Diego Padres in 2013

Staten Island FerryHawks
- Pitcher / Pitching coach
- Born: August 21, 1978 (age 48); Manhasset, New York, U.S.
- Batted: Left Threw: Right

MLB debut
- June 6, 2000, for the Atlanta Braves

Last MLB appearance
- May 25, 2015, for the Cincinnati Reds

MLB statistics
- Win–loss record: 124–118
- Earned run average: 4.61
- Strikeouts: 1,174
- Stats at Baseball Reference

Teams
- Atlanta Braves (2000–2003); St. Louis Cardinals (2004–2006); Chicago Cubs (2007–2008); Colorado Rockies (2009); Washington Nationals (2010–2011); Arizona Diamondbacks (2011); Minnesota Twins (2012); San Diego Padres (2012–2013); Cincinnati Reds (2015)

Career highlights and awards
- All-Star (2009); Silver Slugger Award (2005)

Jason Scott Marquis (/mɑːrˈkiː/ mar-KEE; born August 21, 1978) is an American former professional baseball pitcher. He played in Major League Baseball (MLB) for the Atlanta Braves, St. Louis Cardinals, Chicago Cubs, Colorado Rockies, Washington Nationals, Arizona Diamondbacks, San Diego Padres, Minnesota Twins, and Cincinnati Reds. He also played for Israel at the 2017 World Baseball Classic, serving as the team's ace.

As a 12-year-old, Marquis pitched his team to third place in the Little League World Series with a no-hitter. He is one of only a few ballplayers to have played in both a Little League World Series and a Major League World Series. He also pitched his high school team to consecutive New York City baseball championships. Marquis was drafted in the first round out of high school by the world champion Atlanta Braves, and reached the majors as a 21-year-old in 2000.

As a major leaguer, Marquis won 11 or more games for six straight years through 2009, and also started 28 or more games in each of the years 2004–09. His 65 wins from 2004 to 2008 ranked 7th among N.L. pitchers. He pitched on a World Series champion in 2006, and was an All-Star in 2009. Through 2011, in his career in games that were late and close, Marquis held batters to a .228 batting average. He also excelled with the bat, winning the Silver Slugger Award in 2005. He pitched for Team Israel at the 2017 World Baseball Classic.

== Early life ==
Marquis was born in Manhasset, New York, and grew up in Staten Island's Arden Heights neighborhood, where he attended Paulo Intermediate School 75. His mother works for the New York City Board of Education, and has a teaching degree, while his father owns a check cashing business in Brooklyn. He was a New York Yankees fan growing up, and Don Mattingly was his favorite player.

Marquis, who is Jewish, grew up in a Conservative Jewish home, attended Hebrew school, and observes the major Jewish holidays. "My mother was a bit more stricter [sic] with our Jewish upbringing," said Marquis, "given that her parents were Holocaust survivors." Marquis was featured in the 2008 Hank Greenberg 75th Anniversary edition of Jewish Major Leaguers Baseball Cards, published in affiliation with Fleer Trading Cards and the American Jewish Historical Society, commemorating the Jewish Major Leaguers from 1871 through 2008. He joined, among other Jewish major leaguers, Brad Ausmus, Kevin Youkilis, Ian Kinsler, Ryan Braun, Gabe Kapler, Scott Feldman, John Grabow, Craig Breslow, Jason Hirsh, and Scott Schoeneweis. Through 2014, he was third all-time in career wins and strikeouts (behind Ken Holtzman and Sandy Koufax in both categories) among Jewish major league baseball players.

=== Little League World Series ===
Marquis starred in Little League Baseball on the South Shore Little League team that finished second in the US, and third in the world, in the Little League World Series in 1991. He led his team to a victory in the first round over the Ohio team on his 13th birthday.

His team lost to California in the US final on ESPN, as Marquis was relegated to shortstop because Little Leaguers weren't allowed to pitch two days in a row. Marquis then led his team to victory over Canada in the third-place game, throwing a no-hitter. "Playing in front of that many people at that time in my life made me realize this is what I wanted to do with my life," said Marquis, "and I was going to work my hardest to get it." As of September 2021, he was one of over 50 Little League World Series players to have reached the major leagues.

=== High school ===
"When I was a freshman [in high school] I was 5 ft 2 in (1.57 m), and everyone thought I was too small to play," Marquis said. "But it was always my dream to play major league baseball, and I've always worked very hard at it." As a 6 ft 1 in (1.85 m) junior and senior, however, Marquis threw a 93 miles per hour fastball, a curveball that was nearly unhittable at the high school level, and a changeup. He pitched the Tottenville High School Pirates to two consecutive New York City Public Schools Athletic League (PSAL) titles. The first was a Pirates (22–1) championship in 1995 over the George Washington Trojans (32–3), 3–2 at Shea Stadium, capping a season in which he posted an 11–0 record while striking out 86 batters in 61 innings.

The second championship was in 1996 when the Pirates were 33–1; again over the George Washington Trojans (41–2). He pitched his team to a 5–1, 7-inning complete game victory in which he struck out 15 batters and did not allow any earned runs, while he himself hit a two-run triple, at Yankee Stadium. That capped a season in which he was 14–1 with a 0.40 ERA, and struck out 150 in 79 innings, while as a batter he tied a school season record with 11 home runs, drove in 45 runs, and batted .468.

He received the Iron Horse Award as the top baseball player in the PSAL and The New York Daily News Player of the Year Award. Marquis was named to the All-America Second Team by the American Baseball Coaches Association and Rawlings. Anthony McCarron of The New York Daily News touted him as "perhaps the city's best high school player since ... Manny Ramirez," and Baseball America ranked him the 39th-highest prospect in the nation. He also played basketball at Tottenville, and on the academic side was a member of the National Honor Society. He was a teammate on the baseball team with Anaheim Angels catcher Tom Gregorio. One of his classmates at Tottenville was Chicago Bears defensive end Adewale Ogunleye.

=== Draft ===
The right-hander originally signed a letter of intent to play for the University of Miami, which offered him a scholarship. A message was relayed he had been drafted by the Atlanta Braves in the first round, the 35th selection overall. Marquis was excited, his team won the game and went on to win the city championship. He then opted out of his letter of intent and signed with the Braves on July 18, 1996, for a reported $600,000 ($1,200,000 today) signing bonus.

== Minor league career ==
In 1996 Marquis began his pro career with the Danville Braves (Rookie Advanced) in the Appalachian League, going 1–1 with a 4.63 ERA in 7 games. He had 24 strikeouts and gave up seven walks in 23 innings.

The next year he tied for the South Atlantic League lead with a team-record 14 victories for the Macon Braves (which tied for the league lead), as he went 14–10 with a 4.38 ERA, tied for second in the league with 28 starts, and was named the Braves' fifth-rated prospect by Baseball America. "He's like a man on a mission to get to the big leagues," said Mark Ross, the Macon pitching coach. "He's doing great."

In 1998, he began the season as youngest pitcher in the Carolina League, but won only two of 22 starts for Class A Danville 97s, as he went 2–12 and struck out 135 (8th in the league) in 114.2 innings, while walking only 41.

Marquis began the 1999 season at Class A Myrtle Beach Pelicans of the Carolina League, where he opened the season by firing 20.0 consecutive scoreless innings. Marquis was named Baseball America Carolina League Player of the Week for the period April 15–21, as he pitched 10.0 innings, striking out 11. He allowed only one earned run in six starts (3–0, 0.28 ERA) before being promoted on May 10 to the Double-A Greenville Braves, and was named the Braves' sixth-rated prospect by Baseball America. With Greenville he went 3–4, 4.58 in 12 starts. He spent much of the summer on the disabled list (DL) with a sore elbow, a tender right shoulder, and a pulled oblique stomach muscle.

In 2000 Baseball America named him the Braves' fifth-rated prospect, and he split time between Double-A Greenville (going 4–2 with a 3.57 ERA), the Triple-A Richmond Braves, and Atlanta (15 games in relief; a 5.01 ERA). Marquis spent much of 2003 back in the minors with Richmond, and had a record of 8–4 with a 3.35 ERA in 15 starts.

== Major league career ==
=== Atlanta Braves (2000–03) ===
Marquis was called up to the majors by the Braves in June 2000, at the age of 21 the 10th-youngest player in the NL, after the Braves demoted struggling closer John Rocker for threatening a reporter. He made his debut on June 6, 2000, in relief of Tom Glavine against the Toronto Blue Jays. "Getting that first call and running out to the mound," said Marquis, "I promise you I didn't feel my legs at all." He was later sent back down to AAA Richmond, but was recalled again in September. During the 2000 season he appeared strictly in relief, finishing seven games in his 15 appearances, and winning one.

He became a starting pitcher in 2001, joining a celebrated staff with Greg Maddux, Tom Glavine, and Kevin Millwood. The 9/11 attack that interrupted the season also led to the death of one of his Little League World Series teammates, Michael Cammarata, a firefighter. "It's tough knowing that people died who were part of your life at one point," Marquis said. Marquis was the starting pitcher for the Braves in the first game played in New York City after 9/11.

In his first year as a starter, Marquis held batters to a .145 batting average with runners in scoring position and two out. The club's front office made it clear that he was off-limits in trade talks, saying: "He's going to be a big-time No. 1 pitcher. You don't give up an arm like that." He maintained a spot on the rotation again in 2002 as the fifth starter, behind Maddux, Glavine, Millwood, and Damian Moss.

In 2003, the Braves revamped their starting rotation with the acquisitions of Mike Hampton, Russ Ortiz, Shane Reynolds, and the promotion of Horacio Ramírez from AA. Marquis was sent to the bullpen. Ultimately, he split his season, making only 2 starts in 21 appearances for Atlanta, while starting 15 games for Richmond in AAA.

On December 13, 2003, Marquis was traded to the St. Louis Cardinals along with relief pitcher Ray King and rookie prospect Adam Wainwright for outfielder J. D. Drew and catcher Eli Marrero. Looking back years later, Marquis said: "I was pretty young ... and I think it really shook me, to realize that nothing was forever."

=== St. Louis Cardinals (2004–06) ===
Marquis became a full-time starter in 2004 with the Cardinals, and came under the wing of pitching coach Dave Duncan who observed that Marquis "always had a devastating skinner (sinker), and ... needs to get back to it more." "It's just the pitch I had growing up, and I got away from it," Marquis said. Marquis strung together a Cardinals' season-high 11-game winning streak from May 31–September 4, the longest by a Cards pitcher since 1985 when John Tudor also won 11 straight games. He had a shutout streak of 18 1/3 innings from August 24–September 10. On the business side, the Cardinals players elected him their #2 representative to the Major League Baseball Players Association.

For the season, Marquis posted a career-best 15–9 record, with a 3.71 ERA and a career-high 138 strikeouts, for the National League champions. He was 2nd in the NL in ground ball/fly ball ratio (2.17), tied for 5th in percentage of strikes that were "looking" (31%), 6th in pitches per start (104), 8th in won-lost percentage (.682), 9th in wins (15), and tied for 10th in double plays induced (21). He held batters to a .198 batting average with runners in scoring position, and a .163 batting average with 2 outs and runners in scoring position.

Marquis tossed a scoreless inning of relief in Game 2 of the 2004 World Series at Boston, and Manager Tony La Russa tabbed Marquis to start Game 4. He turned in the best performance of any Cardinals starter in the series, pitching six innings and giving up three runs. He was bested, however, by Boston pitcher Derek Lowe, who threw shutout ball for seven innings to win the series for the Red Sox. "Whether you lose 100 games or win 100 games and go to the World Series, the last day of the season you're still looking around and saying, 'The season is over? What do I do now?' " said Marquis as he stuffed jerseys into a duffel bag. "It's hard to handle."

Marquis had an up-and-down season in 2005. Although he started the season strong, he slid into a personal seven-game losing streak. It ended on August 27, 2005, when Marquis pitched a two-hitter against the Washington Nationals, for his first career shutout. Overall Marquis posted a 13–14 record, with a 4.13 ERA in 207 innings pitched. He appeared in 33 games, starting 32, and completing 3 (6th in the NL). He gave up the second-lowest percentage of line drives in the NL (17.3%), induced 29 double plays (T-4th in the league), and was 4th with 1.26 GIDP/9 IP.

In the postseason he worked out of the bullpen in the NLCS, after not being used in the Division Series, and pitched in three games, finished with a 3.38 ERA.

In January 2006, Marquis and the Cardinals agreed to a one-year contract for $5.15 million, avoiding salary arbitration. The season started off well for Marquis, as on July 23 he became the first NL pitcher to win 12 games, raising his record to 12–7. But Marquis followed with a losing second half of the season. Pitching in the starting rotation all year, Marquis finished 14–16, but with a 6.02 ERA, the 2nd-worst in baseball among players who qualified for the ERA title (Joel Piñeiro, of the Seattle Mariners, finished last with a 6.36 ERA). He led the majors in runs allowed (136), and led the NL in losses (16) and home runs allowed (35). "Obviously, those were tough pills to swallow," Marquis said. "I took one for the team." On the other hand, in games that were late and close, he held batters to a .188 batting average. Marquis did not pitch in the postseason, but despite that, his teammates still voted him a full playoff/World Series share. He was also given a World Series ring.

=== Chicago Cubs (2007–08) ===
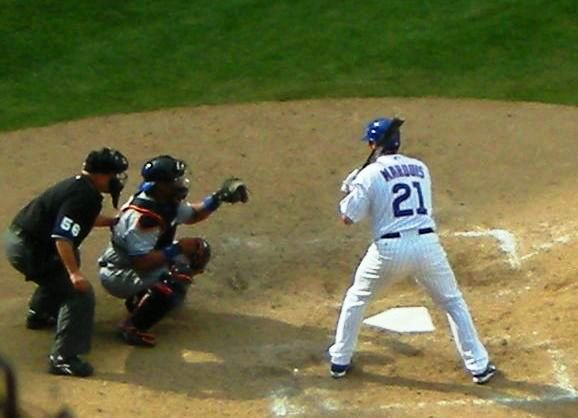
Marquis batting for the Chicago Cubs in 2008

In December 2006 Marquis signed a three-year contract with the Chicago Cubs worth $21 million. With the Cubs, he wore his favorite # 21, the number formerly worn by ex-Cubs slugger Sammy Sosa, who coincidentally hit his 600th home run against Marquis. This caused some concern, due to Sosa's accomplishments with the Cubs, including his status as the Cubs' all-time home run leader.

On May 9, Marquis completed a three-hit shutout against the Pittsburgh Pirates, defeating them 1–0. He had a perfect game going into the 6th inning, retiring the first 16 batters he faced, but Pirates shortstop Don Kelly broke it up with a single. The game took only two hours and six minutes. Marquis struck out five, and needed only 109 pitches to complete the game. "His ball was diving and darting. He was awesome," said teammate Jacque Jones. The win improved Marquis' record to 5–1, and dropped his ERA to 1.70, 3rd-best in the NL. After the game, Marquis highlighted his consistency as being the key to his turnaround. "My delivery is as consistent as it's ever been. I feel like I'm repeating the same delivery over and over again and that's the reason, I really believe, for the success."

In 2007 Marquis was 12–9, with a 4.60 ERA. He was tied for 2nd in the league in shutouts (1), was 5th in the league in hit batsmen (13), had the 5th-lowest batting average in the NL of balls hit into play against him (.280), and had the 8th-highest ground ball percentage (49.5%). He kept batters to a .229 batting average in games that were late and close.

On March 24, 2008, it was announced he would be the Cubs' fifth starter for the 2008 season. Historically, Marquis' numbers during the second half of the season were not as good as his numbers during the first half, but thanks to smart managing by Lou Piniella, Marquis and Rich Harden, newly acquired from the Oakland Athletics on July 8, rotated their starts for a time, and Marquis posted a winning month of August, going 3–1 with a 3.90 ERA. It was his second-lowest ERA after a 3.81 ERA in July. He finished the season 11–9, with a 4.53 ERA, and held batters to a .192 batting average with two outs and runners in scoring position.

On September 26, 2008, the Cubs postseason roster was announced, and Marquis was granted a roster spot as a reliever. Marquis thereby reached the playoffs in all nine of his major league seasons through 2008. He made one appearance against the Dodgers in Game 1 of the National League Division Series, when he pitched the top of the ninth inning. In it he gave up a solo home run to Russell Martin for the Dodgers' seventh and final run of the game — one they'd win by a final score of 7–2.

=== Colorado Rockies (2009) ===
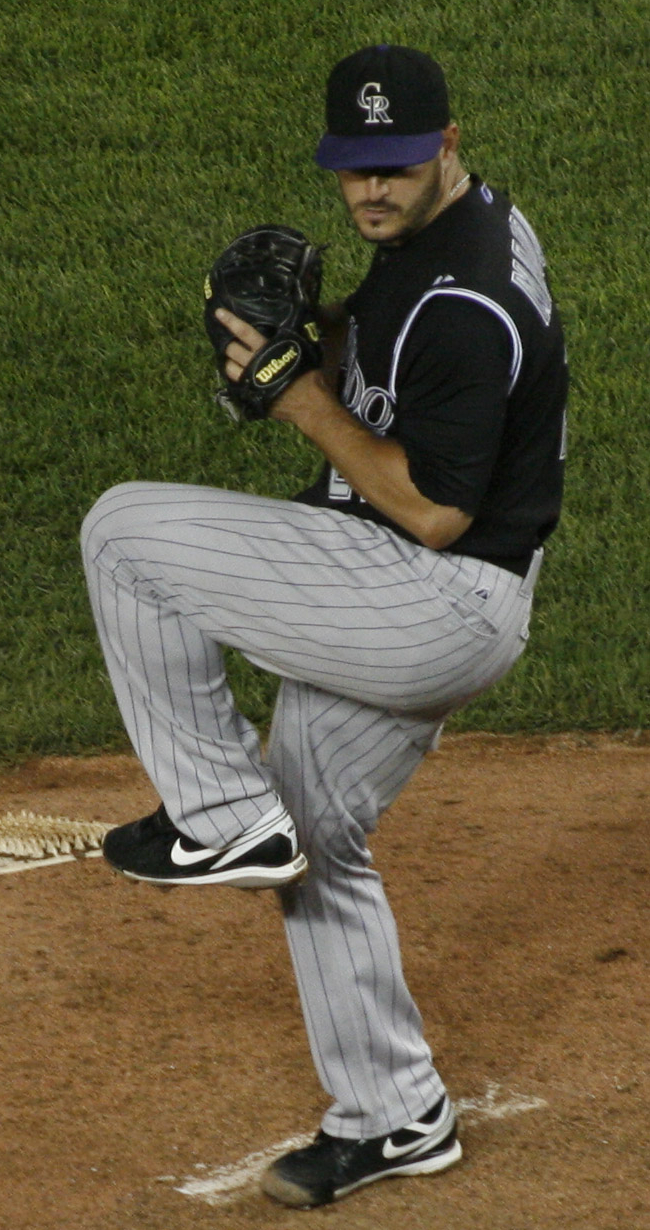
Marquis pitching for the Colorado Rockies in 2009

On January 6, 2009, Marquis was traded to the Colorado Rockies for pitcher Luis Vizcaíno. General Manager Dan O'Dowd said: "We like (Marquis') athleticism, age and durability."

During the off-season, Marquis tweaked his delivery to improve his release point by staying over the rubber longer in his balance point, allowing his arm to catch up, resulting in a 2 to 3 inches longer stride, and leaving him on top of the ball and throwing downhill. Reporters attributed his first-half success to his new delivery and his high ground ball ratio.

On June 30 Marquis pitched a two-hit, no walk, 17-ground-ball-outs, 86-pitch shutout to become the first 10-game winner in the NL. A reporter for MLB.com called it "one of the best pitching performances in Rockies history," and Rob Neyer of ESPN described Marquis that night as "Bob Gibson, Orel Hershiser, and Greg Maddux all rolled into one". He beat the LA Dodgers, which had the best record in the major leagues, and outpitched their ace Chad Billingsley 3–0 in a matchup of pitchers leading the league in wins. It was his third career shutout, and his second complete game of the season. He also drove in two of his team's three runs. "That was something special, as good as I have seen in my 7 1/2 years behind this desk," said Rockies manager Jim Tracy.

On July 5, Phillies manager Charlie Manuel, who managed the NL squad, chose Marquis to be on the NL All Star team, the fifth Rockies pitcher to be an All Star. "This is something ... I'll cherish the rest of my life," said Marquis. The next day Marquis followed up his shutout of the Dodgers with 8 shutout innings in a 1–0 victory over the Nationals, for a major-league-leading 11th win. He became the third pitcher in club history to win 11 games before the All Star break, the team record, joining Shawn Chacón (2003) and Aaron Cook (2008). At the 2009 All Star Game, Marquis (a former Cardinal) received one of the biggest ovations during pregame introductions of any non-Cardinal player, and then warmed up in the ninth inning but never did enter the game.

On August 19, Marquis joined Adam Wainwright as the only 14-game winners in the NL, and tied for the major league lead.

In 2009, Marquis was 2nd in the NL in ground ball outs induced (353) and ground balls induced (408), tied for second in double plays induced (28), 3rd in ground ball percentage (55.6%), 3rd-lowest in pitches per plate appearance (3.53), tied for 4th in wins (15), 8th in innings pitched (216.0) and home runs per 9 innings pitched (.625), 4th-lowest in pitches per inning (15.0; of NL pitchers with 160 or more innings), and tied for 6th in shutouts (1). At the plate, Marquis tied for 3rd in the major leagues among pitchers in runs scored (7), and tied for 6th in doubles (3) and RBIs (8).

Marquis is one of only six major league pitchers who won at least 11 games in each year from 2004 to 2009, the others being CC Sabathia, Derek Lowe, Johan Santana, Javier Vázquez, and John Lackey. He never started fewer than 29 games during that span.

When the Rockies qualified for the postseason in 2009, it marked the 10th time in 10 years (every year of his major league career) that the team for which he pitched made the playoffs. He became the first player in baseball history to have been on a playoff team in each of the first 10 years of his career while playing for at least three different teams.

After the 2009 season Marquis became a free agent. The Rockies offered him arbitration, but he rejected their offer of a one-year, non-guaranteed deal for the possibility that he would receive a multi-year deal.

=== Washington Nationals (2010–11) ===
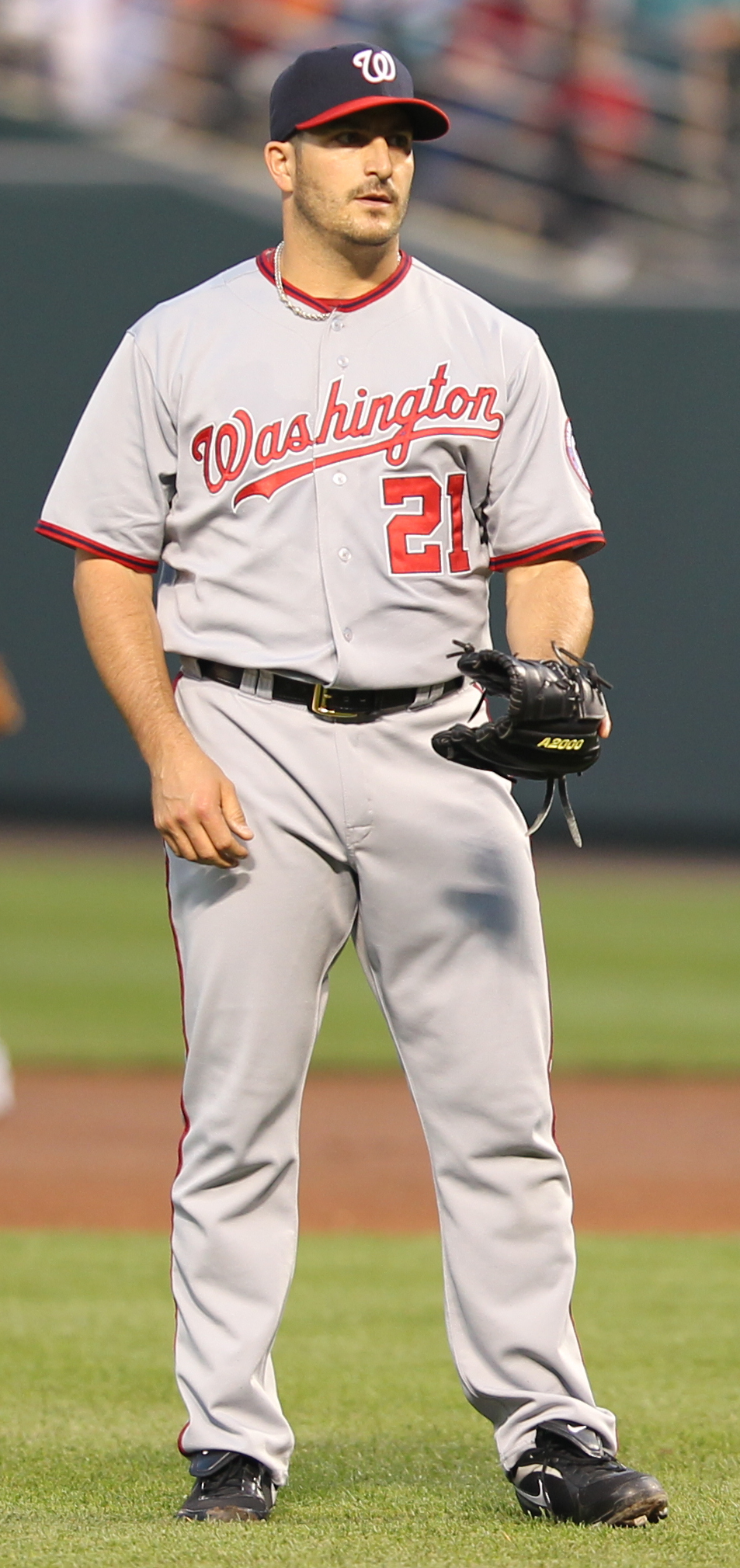
Marquis with the Washington Nationals in 2011

On December 22, 2009, Marquis signed a two-year, $15 million contract with the Washington Nationals for the 2010 and 2011 seasons.

Marquis had 3 starts early in the 2010 season for the Nationals, posting an 0–3 record with a 20.52 ERA before being placed on the 15-day DL on April 22, 2010, with bone chips in his right elbow. He returned to action on August 8, 2010. He was much improved upon returning from his injury, but still finished the season a disappointing 2–9 with a 6.60 ERA.

Marquis started 20 games for the Nationals in 2011, going 8–5 with a 3.95 ERA.

=== Arizona Diamondbacks (2011) ===
On July 30, 2011, Marquis was traded to the Arizona Diamondbacks for minor league infielder Zach Walters. On August 14, during his third start for Arizona, Marquis had his fibula broken by a comebacker and was out for the remainder of the season.

=== Minnesota Twins (2012) ===
Marquis signed a one-year, $3 million contract with the Minnesota Twins on December 22, 2011.

He was designated for assignment in May, after posting an 8.47 ERA in his seven starts. On May 26, 2012, Marquis was released, allowing him to sign with any team.

=== San Diego Padres (2012–13) ===
Marquis signed a minor league contract with the San Diego Padres on May 29, 2012, and was assigned to their Double-A affiliate in San Antonio. After one minor league start, he was promoted to the major league club and made his first start as a Padre on June 7 at home against the San Francisco Giants. Marquis recorded his 1,000th career major league strikeout on June 18 against Ian Kinsler of the Texas Rangers in the second inning of an interleague game at Petco Park. The highlight game of Marquis' season was a two-hit shutout pitched against the Pittsburgh Pirates on August 11. Marquis took a no-hitter into the 7th inning before it was broken up by a Travis Snider infield single.

On August 21, Marquis took a comebacker off the heel of his glove hand, breaking his wrist. Although Marquis continued to pitch in the game, the broken wrist ended his 2012 season. Marquis finished with a 6–7 record and 4.04 ERA in 15 starts for the Padres, with 79 strikeouts and 29 walks. Marquis also upheld his reputation as a good hitter in 2012, collecting nine hits, including three doubles, in 32 at-bats.

The Padres re-signed Marquis in the off-season to a one-year, $3 million contract. He opened the season as the fourth starter in the rotation.

Marquis started the 2013 season with a 9–5 record, including winning eight straight decisions from April 28 to June 15. In July he suffered a complete tear of his ulnar collateral ligament in his right elbow and had Tommy John surgery, which ended his season. He finished with a 4.05 ERA and 72 strikeouts in his 20 starts, but was leading the league with 68 walks at the time of his injury.

=== Philadelphia Phillies ===
On June 3, 2014, Marquis signed a minor league contract with the Philadelphia Phillies. He was released from his contract after coming off the disabled list in late August.

=== Cincinnati Reds (2015) ===
On January 21, 2015, he signed a minor league contract with the Cincinnati Reds. In March 2015, Reds manager Bryan Price announced Marquis would be in the Reds' pitching rotation. In May 2015, Marquis batted eighth in the lineup, the first Reds pitcher to bat higher than ninth since pitcher Red Lucas batted seventh for the Reds on September 7, 1933.

He was 3–4 with a 6.46 ERA in nine starts. He was designated for assignment on June 5, 2015.

== Team Israel ==
When there was talk in the off-season about an Israeli team being fielded in the World Baseball Classic, Marquis said if it came about he would definitely be interested in playing to represent his heritage. In September 2012, Marquis was unable to pitch for Israel at the 2013 World Baseball Classic qualifier due to being active on a major league team. Israel was unable to qualify for the tournament, making it so Marquis was unable to pitch for Israel.

Marquis pitched in the qualifying round for Israel at the 2017 World Baseball Classic qualifier. During the opening game of the qualifiers Marquis started and threw 41 pitches over three innings, while giving up two hits and one earned run, while recording a strikeout and a walk. Under World Baseball Classic rules any pitcher who throws over 50 pitches cannot pitch again for four days, therefore by pulling Marquis before reaching this limit, enabled Israel to utilize Marquis again in the tournament. Marquis again started for the final game of the qualifier and threw 43 pitches over four perfect innings, while recording 5 strikeouts. Following his four perfect innings, Marquis said: "I try to approach every opportunity I get with as much passion as I can, it was definitely our goal to win this qualifier and get to the main event."

Marquis once again pitched for Israel at the World Baseball Classic, during the main tournament in March 2017. He started three of the team's first four games in the WBC, all of which the team won. He went 1–0 with an 0.93 ERA and gave up only one run in 9 2/3 innings to world #3 South Korea, world #5 Cuba, and world #9 the Netherlands.

== Playing style ==
=== Pitching ===
Marquis relied mostly on his sinker. He threw it harder than most pitchers, got plenty of movement on the pitch, and threw it down in the strike zone as he tried to induce hitters to hit ground balls. He also relied heavily on a sharp slider. In his career with Atlanta, the Braves system steered Marquis to also throw a four-seam fastball in the mid- to high-90s, but in St. Louis he began to gravitate toward instead using a sinking two-seam fastball that he had thrown as a teenager, which he still threw in the mid-90s. In addition, he throws an excellent occasional overhand tight curve ball, and a changeup which has good action.

Marquis, the 144th Jewish player in major league history, is sixth all-time in strikeouts among Jewish major league pitchers and seventh in wins, trailing among others Sandy Koufax, Ken Holtzman, and Steve Stone in both categories. In 2009, he became the second Jewish pitcher to notch at least ten victories in six consecutive seasons, joining Koufax.

=== Hitting and baserunning ===
Marquis was an excellent hitter for his position. Though not unheard of for pitchers, Marquis was sometimes called upon to pinch hit, something that is extraordinarily rare for a modern-day pitcher. He constantly hit off the tee in batting cages. His baserunning speed has also led to him being used as a pinch-runner. "Watch Marquis take batting practice," wrote John Schlegel for MLB.com, "and you think you're watching a left-handed slugger. He can ping baseballs off the bleachers with the best of them. Watch him run up the first-base line with the speed of an outfielder and the intensity of a linebacker, and you can't believe he's a pitcher."

In 2005, he achieved two career-highs: a .310 batting average, and a .460 slugging percentage. In 87 at-bats he had 27 hits, including nine doubles, a triple, and a home run as he both scored 10 runs and drove in 10 runs. He was the first pitcher to bat over .300 since Mike Hampton batted .344 in 2002 (minimum of 50 at-bats). His 27 hits were the most by a big-league pitcher since Rick Rhoden had 28 in 1984, and 24 came as a pitcher and three as pinch-hitter. For his hitting, Marquis won the 2005 NL Pitcher Silver Slugger Award.

His first three home runs were hit off Wandy Rodríguez, Brian Lawrence, and Javier Vázquez. In 2008, he hit a career-high two homers as he again drove in 10 runs, this time in 59 at-bats. He belted his fourth home run on September 6, against Cincinnati's Gary Majewski at the Great American Ballpark. On September 22, he hit his first career grand slam, off New York Mets rookie Jon Niese at Shea Stadium. That night he was also credited with five RBIs — four of which came with his grand slam — in a career-high performance. It was the first grand slam by a Jewish pitcher since Saul Rogovin of the Detroit Tigers hit one in 1950 off Eddie Lopat of the Yankees.

In 441 at-bats through 2008, Marquis had a .206 career batting average, with 25 doubles, two triples, five home runs, 50 runs scored, 40 RBIs, 23 sacrifice hits, and a .306 slugging percentage — 9th-best of all pitchers with at least 100 at-bats. He had a .276 career batting average in 59 plate appearances with two outs and runners in scoring position. With the bases loaded, through August 2008 he was a career .364 batter, with a .500 on-base percentage and an .818 slugging percentage. In 26 at-bats as a pinch hitter, he had a .231 batting average. Summarizing his approach to hitting, Marquis said: "I'm not going up as a pitcher with a bat. I'm going up as a hitter."

Marquis, on retiring after the 2015 season, posted a .196 batting average (130-for-663) with 66 runs, 35 doubles, two triples, five home runs, 57 RBI and 13 bases on balls.

=== Fielding ===
Marquis exhibited a better range factor at pitcher than the league average every year of his career, through 2009. He recorded a career .955 fielding percentage.

== Family ==
Marquis and his wife, Debbie (née Masseria), have three children. They currently reside in the Tottenville section of his native Staten Island, New York.

== See also ==
- List of Colorado Rockies team records
- List of Jewish Major League Baseball players
