= Michael Chavis =

American baseball player (born 1995)

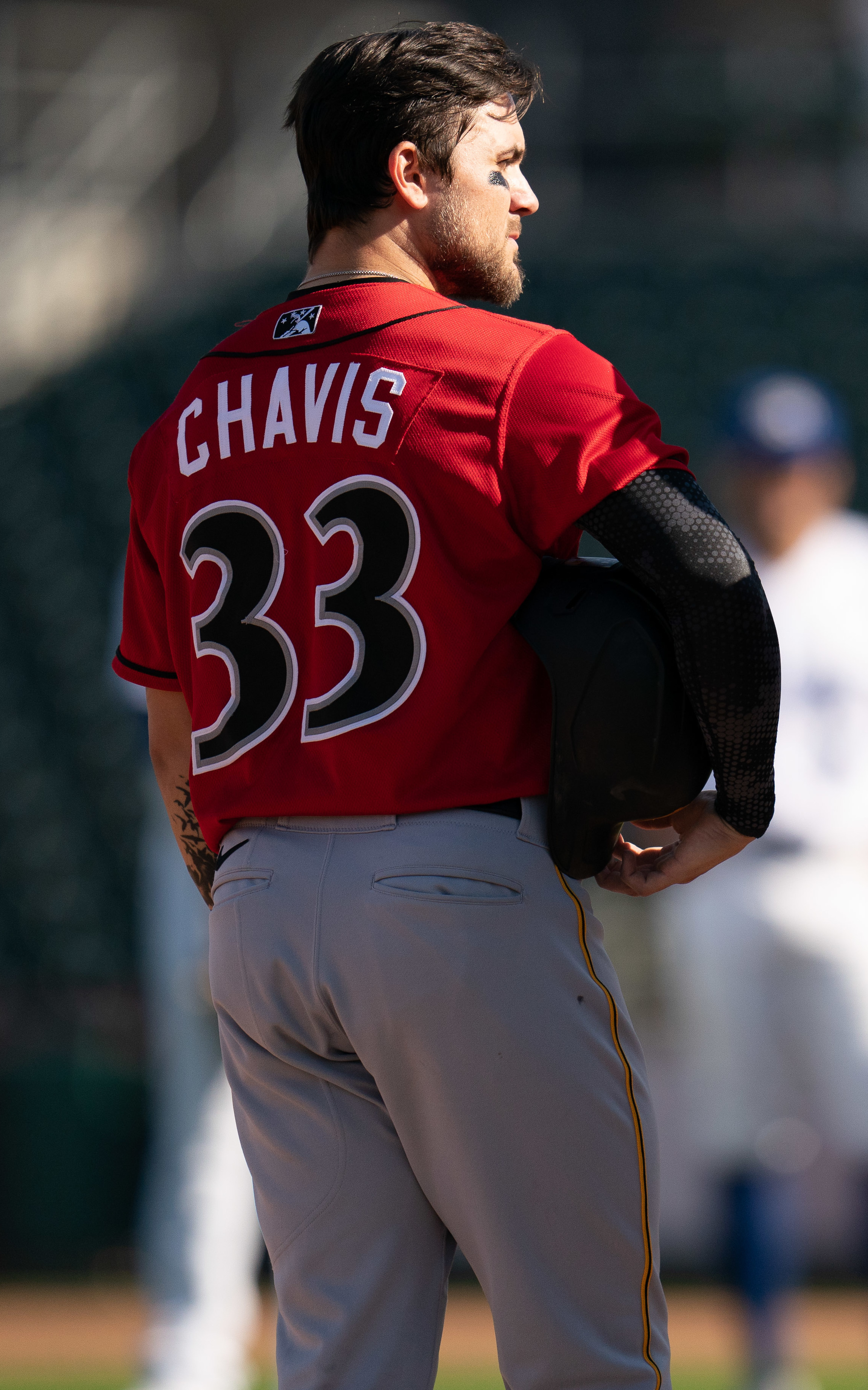
- Chavis with the Indianapolis Indians in 2021

Free agent
- First baseman / Second baseman
- Born: August 11, 1995 (age 31); Atlanta, Georgia, U.S.
- Bats: Right Throws: Right

Professional debut
- MLB: April 20, 2019, for the Boston Red Sox
- NPB: July 30, 2025, for the Chunichi Dragons

MLB statistics (through 2023 season)
- Batting average: .238
- Home runs: 42
- Runs batted in: 142

NPB statistics (through 2025 season)
- Batting average: .171
- Home runs: 5
- Runs batted in: 8
- Stats at Baseball Reference

Teams
- Boston Red Sox (2019–2021); Pittsburgh Pirates (2021–2022); Washington Nationals (2023); Chunichi Dragons (2025)

Michael Scott Chavis (born August 11, 1995) is an American professional baseball infielder who is a free agent. He has previously played in Major League Baseball (MLB) the Boston Red Sox, Pittsburgh Pirates, and Washington Nationals, and in Nippon Professional Baseball (NPB) for the Chunichi Dragons. Listed at 5 feet 10 inches (1.78 m) and 210 pounds (95 kg), Chavis bats and throws right-handed.

== Early years and education ==
Chavis attended Sprayberry High School in Marietta, Georgia. Committed to Clemson University, Chavis won the home run derby at the Perfect Game All-American Classic in 2014. As a senior, he won Gatorade Baseball Player of the Year honors for Georgia, with a slash line of .580/.663/1.197 in 28 games, including 13 home runs, nine doubles. one triple, 37 run batted in (RBIs), 30 runs, and 21 stolen bases.

== Baseball career ==
=== Boston Red Sox ===
==== Minor leagues ====
The Boston Red Sox selected Chavis in the first round, with the 26th overall selection, of the 2014 Major League Baseball draft. Chavis signed with the Red Sox rather than attend Clemson, and started his professional career with the rookie-level Gulf Coast League Red Sox in their 2014 season. He struggled early in that season, but ultimately finished his rookie year with an average of .269 (36-for-134), one home run and 16 RBIs in 39 games. He then belted a homer and drove in five runs in three playoff games, to help the Red Sox clinch the Gulf Coast League championship.

Chavis opened 2015 with the Single-A Greenville Drive, where he hit 15 home runs on the year to lead the Red Sox system. He also had 144 strikeouts in 435 at bats to just 29 walks, while slashing .223/.277/.405 with 58 RBI in 109 games. He stayed with Greenville in 2016, beginning the season with a .388 average through 12 games; however, a thumb injury sidelined him in late April. Upon his return, his numbers steadily eroded, and he finished his time in Greenville with a .244/.321/.391 line, eight homers, and 35 RBI in 74 games before being promoted to High-A Salem Red Sox late in August. He hit .160 (4-for-25) with five runs and one RBI in just seven games.

After two inconsistent and injury-plagued seasons, Chavis slashed .318/.388/.641 with 17 home runs and 55 RBI in 250 plate appearances in 59 games for Salem before being called up to the Double-A Portland Sea Dogs. The promotion came after he was named the MVP at the Carolina League All-Star Game, where he went 1-for-3 and drove in both of the North Division's runs in a 2–0 victory at Salem Memorial Ballpark. At the time, Chavis led the league in homers, RBIs, slugging percentage (.641) and run scored (50), while ranking second in extra-base hits (36), and third both in average and total bases (143). Overall, Chavis finished the 2017 season with 31 homers, 35 doubles, 2 triples, 94 RBIs, 89 runs and a .282/.347/.563 line in 126 games between Salem and Portland. He became the first 30-homer player in the Red Sox minors since Ryan Lavarnway (34) and Bryce Brentz (30) in 2011. He finished the year rated as the Red Sox' No. 2 prospect, according to MLB.com.

==== Suspension ====
On April 6, 2018, Chavis was suspended for 80 games without pay due to testing positive for dehydrochlormethyltestosterone, a performance-enhancing drug, brand name Turinabol. He has stated that he never knowingly consumed anything on the banned substance list. After serving his suspension, Chavis made his 2018 debut with the Class A Short Season Lowell Spinners on July 2. He was later assigned to Double-A Portland. On August 24, Chavis was promoted to the Triple-A Pawtucket Red Sox. Overall for the 2018 season with three teams, Chavis batted .298 with nine home runs and 27 RBIs in 46 games played. The Red Sox added Chavis to their 40-man roster after the 2018 season.

==== Major leagues ====
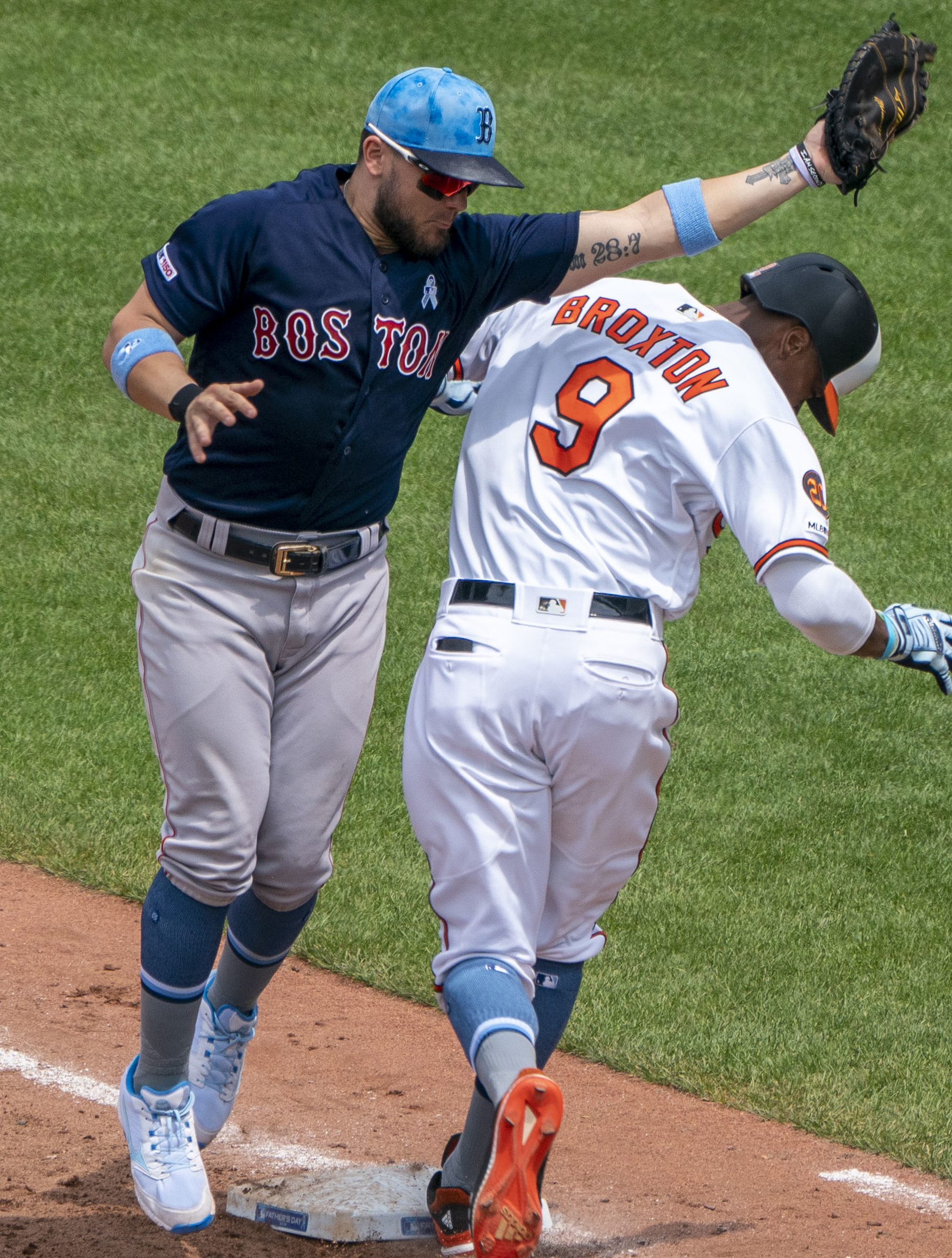
Chavis (left) in June 2019

Chavis opened the 2019 season with Pawtucket. On April 19, he was added to the major league active roster for the first time. He made his MLB debut against the Tampa Bay Rays the following day, doubling as a pinch hitter. On April 23, Chavis hit his first major league home run in a 4–2 loss to the Detroit Tigers. On May 15, he hit a walk-off single in the 10th inning of a 6–5 win over the Colorado Rockies. On June 3, it was announced Chavis had won the American League Rookie of the Month Award for May. At the end of June, Chavis had appeared in 63 games with Boston, batting .261 with 14 home runs and 44 RBIs. On July 15, he hit his first major league grand slam, off of Trent Thornton of the Toronto Blue Jays. On August 12, Chavis was placed on the injured list with a left AC joint sprain; he began a rehabilitation assignment with Pawtucket on August 23. On September 20, Boston manager Alex Cora indicated that Chavis would not return to the Red Sox for their remaining games in the season, but would likely play in the Puerto Rican Winter League. In 95 games with the 2019 Red Sox, Chavis hit .254 with 18 home runs and 58 RBIs.

In the start-delayed 2020 season, Chavis was part of Boston's Opening Day lineup. On August 18, he became the fourth batter in Red Sox franchise history to strike out five times in a game. Overall with the 2020 Red Sox, Chavis batted .212 with five home runs and 19 RBIs in 42 games.

In March 2021, Chavis was optioned to Boston's alternate training site near the end of spring training. On April 10, was activated for one game when J. D. Martinez was briefly on the COVID-related list. Chavis began the minor league season in Triple-A with the Worcester Red Sox, and was activated several times. Through July, Chavis appeared in 31 games with Boston while batting .190 with two home runs and six RBIs.

=== Pittsburgh Pirates ===
On July 30, 2021, Chavis was traded to the Pittsburgh Pirates in exchange for relief pitcher Austin Davis. Through the end of the regular season, he appeared in 12 games for Pittsburgh, batting .357, and 25 games for the Triple-A Indianapolis Indians, where he had a .278 average.

Chavis played in a career–high 129 games for the Pirates in 2022, slashing .229/.265/.389 with 14 home runs and 49 RBI. On September 26, 2022, Chavis was designated for assignment. He cleared waivers and was sent outright to Triple–A Indianapolis on September 29. After the season, he elected free agency on October 6.

=== Washington Nationals ===
On January 2, 2023, Chavis signed a minor league deal with the Washington Nationals. On March 30, Chavis had his contract selected after making the Opening Day roster. In 48 games for the Nationals, he batted .242/.281/.341 with 2 home runs and 5 RBI. Following the season on October 18, Chavis was removed from the 40–man roster and sent outright to the Triple–A Rochester Red Wings. However, he subsequently rejected the assignment and elected free agency.

=== Seattle Mariners ===
On January 11, 2024, Chavis signed a minor league deal with the Seattle Mariners that included a non-roster invitation to spring training. In 46 games for the Triple–A Tacoma Rainiers, he batted .290/.367/.485 with seven home runs and 29 RBI. Chavis triggered the opt–out clause in his contract and was released by the Mariners organization on June 1.

=== Chicago White Sox ===
On June 5, 2024, Chavis signed a minor league contract with the Chicago White Sox. In 67 games for the Triple-A Charlotte Knights, he batted .234/.308/.414 with nine home runs, 27 RBI, and nine stolen bases. Chavis elected free agency following the season on November 4.

=== Los Angeles Dodgers ===
On February 14, 2025, Chavis signed a minor league contract with the Los Angeles Dodgers. He played in 63 games for the Triple-A Oklahoma City Comets, batting .291/.350/.547 with 13 home runs and 45 RBI. In a June 14 game against the Albuquerque Isotopes, Chavis hit for the cycle. He was released by the Dodgers organization on July 8.

=== Chunichi Dragons ===
On July 11, 2025, Chavis was officially signed by the Chunichi Dragons of Nippon Professional Baseball, joining another former first-round pick in Kyle Muller. In 38 appearances for Chunichi, he batted .171/.267/.352 with five home runs and eight RBI. On December 3, the Dragons announced that they would not bring Chavis back for the 2026 season.

=== Cincinnati Reds ===
On December 24, 2025, Chavis signed a minor league contract with the Cincinnati Reds. In 125 games with Triple-A Louisville Bats he batted .248/.325/.454 with 25 home runs, 78 RBIs and 4 stolen bases. He elected free agency on November 2.

== Personal life ==
Chavis's nickname, "Ice Horse," was coined on the Section 10 Podcast, a Red Sox podcast hosted by Barstool Sports Boston employees, and soon adopted by fans, MLB, and Chavis himself.

Chavis is a Christian. In high school, he was told "at 11:11, you make a wish", and in his later high school years he began posting the phrase "11:11" on social media with a new purpose: "I didn't like the idea of making a wish for no purpose ... I thought, why don't I say a prayer or something that's actually beneficial." He frequently uses his platform to post encouraging messages on social media while spreading his faith.

Chavis has stated that his father is "full-blood Cherokee Indian" and his mother is from New York.
