= 1994 Carolina League season =

- League: Carolina League
- Sport: Baseball
- Duration: April 7 – September 4
- Games: 140
- Teams: 8

Regular season
- Season MVP: Larry Sutton, Wilmington Blue Rocks

Playoffs
- League champions: Wilmington Blue Rocks
- Runners-up: Winston-Salem Spirits

CL seasons
- ← 1993 1995 →

The 1994 Carolina League was a Class A-Advanced baseball season played between April 7 and September 4. Eight teams played a 140-game schedule, with the winners of each half of the season competing in the playoffs.

The Wilmington Blue Rocks won the Carolina League championship, defeating the Winston-Salem Spirits in the final round of the playoffs.

== Team changes ==
- The Prince William Cannons ended their affiliation with the New York Yankees and began a new affiliation with the Chicago White Sox.

== Teams ==
1994 Carolina League
Division	Team	City	MLB Affiliate	Stadium
Northern	Frederick Keys	Frederick, Maryland	Baltimore Orioles	Harry Grove Stadium
Northern	Lynchburg Red Sox	Lynchburg, Virginia	Boston Red Sox	City Stadium
Northern	Prince William Cannons	Woodbridge, Virginia	Chicago White Sox	Prince William County Stadium
Northern	Wilmington Blue Rocks	Wilmington, Delaware	Kansas City Royals	Daniel S. Frawley Stadium
Southern	Durham Bulls	Durham, North Carolina	Atlanta Braves	Durham Athletic Park
Southern	Kinston Indians	Kinston, North Carolina	Cleveland Indians	Grainger Stadium
Southern	Salem Buccaneers	Salem, Virginia	Pittsburgh Pirates	Salem Municipal Field
Southern	Winston-Salem Spirits	Winston-Salem, North Carolina	Cincinnati Reds	Ernie Shore Field

== Map of teams ==
Northern division Southern division

== Regular season ==
=== Summary ===
- The Wilmington Blue Rocks finished with the best record in the league for the first time in team history.

=== Standings ===
Northern division
Team	Win	Loss	%	GB
Wilmington Blue Rocks	94	44	.681	–
Frederick Keys	76	61	.555	17.5
Prince William Cannons	71	65	.522	22
Lynchburg Red Sox	52	87	.374	42.5
Southern division
Winston-Salem Spirits	67	70	.489	–
Durham Bulls	66	70	.485	0.5
Salem Buccaneers	64	75	.460	4
Kinston Indians	60	78	.435	7.5

== League Leaders ==
=== Batting leaders ===
Stat	Player	Total
AVG	Harry Berrios, Frederick Keys	.348
H	Pat Watkins, Winston-Salem Spirits	152
R	Pat Watkins, Winston-Salem Spirits	107
2B	Craig Wilson, Prince William Cannons	36
3B	Mike Cameron, Prince William Cannons	17
HR	Toby Rumfield, Winston-Salem Spirits	29
RBI	B.J. Waszgis, Frederick Keys	100
SB	Essex Burton, Prince William Cannons	66

=== Pitching leaders ===
Stat	Player	Total
W	Sean Johnston, Prince William Cannons	15
ERA	Kris Ralston, Wilmington Blue Rocks	2.39
CG	Michael Call, Prince William Cannons	8
SV	Chris Lemp, Frederick Keys	21
SO	Jim Pittsley, Wilmington Blue Rocks	171
IP	Jason Pierson, Prince William Cannons	189.1

== Playoffs ==
- The Wilmington Blue Rocks won their first Carolina League championship, defeating the Winston-Salem Spirits in three games.

=== Playoff bracket ===
Semi-finals
N1	Wilmington	bye
S1	Winston-Salem	2
S2	Durham	0

Finals
N1	Wilmington	3
S1	Winston-Salem	0

== Awards ==
Carolina League awards
Award name	Recipient
Most Valuable Player	Larry Sutton, Wilmington Blue Rocks
Pitcher of the Year	Bart Evans, Wilmington Blue Rocks
Manager of the Year	Mike Jirschele, Wilmington Blue Rocks

== See also ==
- 1994 Major League Baseball season
