= 1993 Carolina League season =

- League: Carolina League
- Sport: Baseball
- Duration: April 8 – September 4
- Number of games: 140
- Number of teams: 8

Regular season
- Season MVP: Bubba Smith, Winston-Salem Spirits

Playoffs
- League champions: Winston-Salem Spirits
- Runners-up: Wilmington Blue Rocks

CL seasons
- ← 1992 1994 →

The 1993 Carolina League was a Class A-Advanced baseball season played between April 8 and September 4. Eight teams played a 140-game schedule, with the winners of each half of the season competing in the playoffs.

The Winston-Salem Spirits won the Carolina League championship, defeating the Wilmington Blue Rocks in the final round of the playoffs.

== Team changes ==
- The Peninsula Pilots relocate to Wilmington, Delaware and are renamed the Wilmington Blue Rocks. The club ended their affiliation with the Seattle Mariners and began a new affiliation with the Kansas City Royals. The Blue Rocks moved from the Southern Division to the Northern Division.
- The Winston-Salem Spirits ended their affiliation with the Chicago Cubs and began a new affiliation with the Cincinnati Reds.
- The Salem Buccaneers moved from the Northern Division to the Southern Division.

== Teams ==
1993 Carolina League
Division	Team	City	MLB Affiliate	Stadium
Northern	Frederick Keys	Frederick, Maryland	Baltimore Orioles	Harry Grove Stadium
Northern	Lynchburg Red Sox	Lynchburg, Virginia	Boston Red Sox	City Stadium
Northern	Prince William Cannons	Woodbridge, Virginia	New York Yankees	Prince William County Stadium
Northern	Wilmington Blue Rocks	Wilmington, Delaware	Kansas City Royals	Legends Stadium
Southern	Durham Bulls	Durham, North Carolina	Atlanta Braves	Durham Athletic Park
Southern	Kinston Indians	Kinston, North Carolina	Cleveland Indians	Grainger Stadium
Southern	Salem Buccaneers	Salem, Virginia	Pittsburgh Pirates	Salem Municipal Field
Southern	Winston-Salem Spirits	Winston-Salem, North Carolina	Cincinnati Reds	Ernie Shore Field

== Map of teams ==
Northern division Southern division

== Regular season ==
=== Summary ===
- The Frederick Keys finished with the best record in the league for the first time in team history.

=== Standings ===
Northern division
Team	Win	Loss	%	GB
Frederick Keys	78	62	.557	–
Wilmington Blue Rocks	74	65	.532	3.5
Prince William Cannons	67	73	.479	11
Lynchburg Red Sox	65	74	.468	12.5
Southern division
Kinston Indians	71	67	.514	–
Winston-Salem Spirits	72	68	.514	–
Durham Bulls	69	69	.500	2
Salem Buccaneers	61	79	.436	11

== League Leaders ==
=== Batting leaders ===
Stat	Player	Total
AVG	Felix Colon, Lynchburg Red Sox	.320
H	Tim Belk, Winston-Salem Spirits; Curtis Goodwin, Frederick Keys	156
R	Curtis Goodwin, Frederick Keys	98
2B	Marc Marini, Kinston Indians	34
3B	Curtis Goodwin, Frederick Keys	10
HR	Bubba Smith, Winston-Salem Spirits	27
RBI	Chad Mottola, Winston-Salem Spirits	91
SB	Curtis Goodwin, Frederick Keys	61

=== Pitching leaders ===
Stat	Player	Total
W	Rick Forney, Frederick Keys	14
ERA	Ron Frazier, Prince William Cannons	2.14
CG	Rob Henkel, Lynchburg Red Sox	7
SV	John Hrusovsky, Winston-Salem Spirits	25
SO	Joel Bennett, Lynchburg Red Sox	221
IP	Joel Bennett, Lynchburg Red Sox	181.0

== Playoffs ==
- The Winston-Salem Spirits won their ninth Carolina League championship, defeating the Wilmington Blue Rocks in four games.

=== Playoff bracket ===
Semi-finals
N1	Frederick	0
N2	Wilmington	2
S1	Kinston	1
S2	Winston-Salem	2

Finals
N2	Wilmington	1
S2	Winston-Salem	3

== Awards ==
Carolina League awards
Award name	Recipient
Most Valuable Player	Bubba Smith, Winston-Salem Spirits
Pitcher of the Year	Julián Tavárez, Kinston Indians
Manager of the Year	Dave Keller, Kinston Indians; Pete Mackanin, Frederick Keys

== See also ==
- 1993 Major League Baseball season
