= 1991 Carolina League season =

- League: Carolina League
- Sport: Baseball
- Duration: April 11 – September 2
- Number of games: 140
- Number of teams: 8

Regular season
- Season MVP: Pedro Castellano, Winston-Salem Spirits

Playoffs
- League champions: Kinston Indians
- Runners-up: Lynchburg Red Sox

CL seasons
- ← 1990 1992 →

The 1991 Carolina League was a Class A-Advanced baseball season played between April 11 and September 2. Eight teams played a 140-game schedule, with the winners of each half of the season competing in the playoffs.

The Kinston Indians won the Carolina League championship, defeating the Lynchburg Red Sox in the final round of the playoffs.

== Teams ==
1991 Carolina League
Division	Team	City	MLB Affiliate	Stadium
Northern	Frederick Keys	Frederick, Maryland	Baltimore Orioles	Harry Grove Stadium
Northern	Lynchburg Red Sox	Lynchburg, Virginia	Boston Red Sox	City Stadium
Northern	Prince William Cannons	Woodbridge, Virginia	New York Yankees	Prince William County Stadium
Northern	Salem Buccaneers	Salem, Virginia	Pittsburgh Pirates	Salem Municipal Field
Southern	Durham Bulls	Durham, North Carolina	Atlanta Braves	Durham Athletic Park
Southern	Kinston Indians	Kinston, North Carolina	Cleveland Indians	Grainger Stadium
Southern	Peninsula Pilots	Hampton, Virginia	Seattle Mariners	War Memorial Stadium
Southern	Winston-Salem Spirits	Winston-Salem, North Carolina	Chicago Cubs	Ernie Shore Field

== Map of teams ==
Northern division Southern division

== Regular season ==
=== Summary ===
- The Kinston Indians finished with the best record in the league for the second consecutive season.

=== Standings ===
Northern division
Team	Win	Loss	%	GB
Prince William Cannons	71	68	.511	–
Lynchburg Red Sox	67	72	.482	4
Salem Buccaneers	63	77	.450	8.5
Frederick Keys	58	82	.414	13.5
Southern division
Kinston Indians	89	49	.645	–
Winston-Salem Spirits	83	57	.593	7
Durham Bulls	79	58	.577	9.5
Peninsula Pilots	46	93	.331	43.5

== League Leaders ==
=== Batting leaders ===
Stat	Player	Total
AVG	Jeff McNeely, Lynchburg Red Sox	.322
H	Manny Alexander, Frederick Keys	143
R	Manny Alexander, Frederick Keys; Jerrone Williams, Winston-Salem Spirits	81
2B	Sean Moore, Lynchburg Red Sox	30
3B	Jerrone Williams, Winston-Salem Spirits	11
HR	Tracy Sanders, Kinston Indians	18
RBI	Pedro Castellano, Winston-Salem Spirits	87
SB	Ramon Caraballo, Durham Bulls	53

=== Pitching leaders ===
Stat	Player	Total
W	Ryan Hawblitzel, Winston-Salem Spirits; Curt Leskanic, Kinston Indians	15
ERA	Sam Militello, Prince William Cannons	1.22
CG	Tim Smith, Lynchburg Red Sox	8
SV	Mike Soper, Kinston Indians	41
SO	Curt Leskanic, Kinston Indians	163
IP	Tim Smith, Lynchburg Red Sox	174.2

== Playoffs ==
- The Kinston Indians won their second Carolina League championship, defeating the Lynchburg Red Sox in three games.

=== Playoff bracket ===
Semi-finals
N1	Prince William	0
N2	Lynchburg	2
S1	Kinston	bye

Finals
N2	Lynchburg	0
S1	Kinston	3

== Awards ==
Carolina League awards
Award name	Recipient
Most Valuable Player	Pedro Castellano, Winston-Salem Spirits
Pitcher of the Year	Sam Militello, Prince William Cannons
Manager of the Year	Brian Graham, Kinston Indians

== See also ==
- 1991 Major League Baseball season
