= 2003 Atlantic Coast Conference baseball tournament =

American college baseball tournament

- 2003 ACC Baseball Championship Logo
- Teams: 9
- Format: Single-elimination play-in game Double-elimination tournament
- Finals site: Salem Memorial Baseball Stadium; Salem, VA
- Champions: Georgia Tech Yellow Jackets (6th title)
- Winning coach: Danny Hall (2nd title)
- MVP: Brian Burks (Georgia Tech Yellow Jackets)

2003 Atlantic Coast Conference baseball standings
	Conf.				Overall
Team	W		L	PCT	W		L	PCT
No. 9 Florida State ‍†‍‍^{y}	19	–	5	.792	54	–	13	.806
No. 14 Georgia Tech ^{‡y} ‍‍‍	17	–	7	.708	44	–	18	.710
No. 12 NC State ‍‍‍^{y}	15	–	9	.625	45	–	16	.738
Clemson ‍‍‍^{y}	15	–	9	.625	39	–	22	.639
No. 19 North Carolina ‍‍‍^{y}	13	–	11	.542	42	–	23	.646
Virginia ‍‍‍	11	–	12	.478	29	–	25	.537
Wake Forest ‍‍‍	8	–	15	.348	29	–	24	.547
Maryland ‍‍‍	6	–	17	.261	20	–	33	.377
Duke ‍‍‍	2	–	21	.087	18	–	36	.333
† – Conference champion ‡ – Tournament champion y – Invited to the NCAA tournament As of June 30, 2003; Rankings from Collegiate Baseball

The 2003 Atlantic Coast Conference baseball tournament was held at the Salem Memorial Baseball Stadium in Salem, Virginia, from May 20 through 25. Georgia Tech won the tournament, in large part by winning three games on the final day of the event, and earned the Atlantic Coast Conference's automatic bid to the 2003 NCAA Division I baseball tournament.

== Tournament ==
=== Play-in game ===
- The two teams with the worst records in regular season conference play faced each other in a single elimination situation to earn the 8th spot in the conference tournament.

Play-in game
8	Maryland	3
9	Duke	5

=== Main Bracket ===
==== Seeding Procedure ====
From TheACC.com:

On Saturday (The Semifinals) of the ACC Baseball Tournament, the match-up between the four remaining teams is determined by previous opponents. If teams have played previously in the tournament, every attempt will be made to avoid a repeat match-up between teams, regardless of seed. If it is impossible to avoid a match-up that already occurred, then the determination is based on avoiding the most recent, current tournament match-up, regardless of seed. If no match-ups have occurred, the team left in the winners bracket will play the lowest seeded team from the losers bracket.

==== Bracket ====
1st Round
4	Clemson	2
5	North Carolina	10
9	Duke	0
1	Florida State	13
2	Georgia Tech	9
7	Wake Forest	8
3	NC State	10
6	Virginia	6

2nd Round
5	North Carolina	3
1	Florida State	2
2	Georgia Tech	0
3	NC State	6
Lower round 1
4	Clemson	4
9	Duke	7
7	Wake Forest	11
6	Virginia	12

3rd Round
5	North Carolina	6
3	NC State	7
Lower round 2
9	Duke	4
2	Georgia Tech	23
6	Virginia	0
1	Florida State	2

Semifinals
1	Florida State	17
3	NC State	6
5	North Carolina	6
2	Georgia Tech	10

Championship
1	Florida State	7
2	Georgia Tech	10

Championship (if-needed)
3	NC State	5
2	Georgia Tech	6

== All-Tournament Team ==
Position	Player	School
1B	Clifton Remole	Georgia Tech
2B	Eric Patterson	Georgia Tech
3B	Micah Owings	Georgia Tech
SS	Chad Orvella	NC State
C	Tony Richie	Florida State
OF	Sean Farrell	North Carolina
OF	Jeremy Slayden	Georgia Tech
OF	Blake Balkcom	Florida State
DH	Joe Koshansky	Virginia
P	Nate Cretarolo	NC State
P	Brian Burks	Georgia Tech
MVP	Brian Burks	Georgia Tech

(*)Denotes Unanimous Selection

== See also ==
- College World Series
- NCAA Division I Baseball Championship
