= John Cummings (baseball) =

American baseball player (born 1969)

- Pitcher
- Born: May 10, 1969 (age 57); Torrance, California, U.S.
- Batted: Left Threw: Left

MLB debut
- April 10, 1993, for the Seattle Mariners

Last MLB appearance
- June 5, 1997, for the Detroit Tigers

MLB statistics
- Win–loss record: 10–15
- Earned run average: 5.33
- Strikeouts: 114
- Stats at Baseball Reference

Teams
- Seattle Mariners (1993–1995); Los Angeles Dodgers (1995–1996); Detroit Tigers (1996–1997)

John Russell Cummings (born May 10, 1969) is an American former professional baseball left-handed pitcher who played in Major League Baseball (MLB) for three teams from 1993 to 1997.

Jones attended Canyon High School in Anaheim, California. The New York Yankees selected him in the 1988 MLB draft but he chose to play college baseball for the USC Trojans. The Seattle Mariners selected him in the eighth round of the 1990 MLB draft. In the minors, he learned to throw a curveball and changeup, then in 1992, started the Carolina League All-Star Game and was named the league's pitcher of the year. He made his MLB debut in April 1993, but was demoted to the minors after going 0–6 in the team's starting rotation. He split 1994 between the majors and minors. Before the 1995 season, coach Bobby Cuellar suggested a mechanical change that improved his velocity. After a brief stint in the majors, Seattle put him on waivers in May, where he was claimed off waivers by the Los Angeles Dodgers.

The Dodgers traded Cummings to the Detroit Tigers on July 31, 1996, with pitcher Joey Eischen for outfielder Chad Curtis. As a left-handed specialist, he escaped bases loaded jams by getting out Ken Griffey Jr. and Will Clark in his first two games with the Tigers. After pitching for Detroit in part of the 1997 season, Cummings pitched in Triple-A in 1999 and 2000.
