= Kevin Bearse =

American baseball player (born 1965)

- Pitcher
- Born: November 7, 1965 (age 60); Jersey City, New Jersey, U.S.
- Batted: Left Threw: Left

MLB debut
- April 15, 1990, for the Cleveland Indians

Last MLB appearance
- April 30, 1990, for the Cleveland Indians

MLB statistics
- Games pitched: 3
- Earned run average: 12.91
- Strikeouts: 2
- Stats at Baseball Reference

Teams
- Cleveland Indians (1990)

Kevin Gerard Bearse (born November 7, 1965) is an American former professional baseball pitcher who played for the Cleveland Indians of Major League Baseball (MLB) for three games during the 1990 season.

== Amateur career ==
Bearse attended Old Dominion University, and in 1984 he played collegiate summer baseball with the Orleans Cardinals of the Cape Cod Baseball League. Bearse set Old Dominion and Sun Belt Conference records in strikeouts and complete games. In 1995, he was inducted into the school's athletics hall of fame. He was selected by the Indians in the 22nd round of the 1987 MLB draft.

== Professional career ==
He led the Carolina League with 22 saves for Kinston Indians. He recorded a spring training save for the Indians on April 2, 1989 with a hitless ninth inning against the Cincinnati Reds. He made his regular season debut for Cleveland the following season.

== Personal ==
He currently is a Health and Physical Education teacher at Marlboro Memorial Middle School in Marlboro, New Jersey. He has worked there for 29 years.
