= Frank Seminara =

American baseball player (born 1967)

- Pitcher
- Born: May 16, 1967 (age 59); Brooklyn, New York, U.S.
- Batted: Right Threw: Right

MLB debut
- June 2, 1992, for the San Diego Padres

Last MLB appearance
- June 5, 1994, for the New York Mets

MLB statistics
- Win–loss record: 12–9
- Earned run average: 4.12
- Strikeouts: 90
- Stats at Baseball Reference

Teams
- San Diego Padres (1992–1993); New York Mets (1994)

Frank Peter Seminara (born May 16, 1967) is an American former Major League Baseball pitcher. Seminara played for the San Diego Padres and the New York Mets from 1992 to 1994. He threw and batted right-handed.

Seminara graduated from Columbia College of Columbia University in 1989. He currently works as managing director at Morgan Stanley Private Wealth Management. He has been ranked #1 on Forbes's Best-In-State Wealth Advisors in North New Jersey in 2018 and 2019.
