= Kevin Pickford =

American baseball player (born 1975)

- Pitcher
- Born: March 12, 1975 (age 51); Fresno, California, U.S.
- Batted: Left Threw: Left

MLB debut
- May 16, 2002, for the San Diego Padres

Last MLB appearance
- July 21, 2002, for the San Diego Padres

MLB statistics
- Win–loss record: 0–2
- Earned run average: 6.00
- Strikeouts: 18

CPBL statistics
- Win–loss record: 0–1
- Earned run average: 11.05
- Strikeouts: 3
- Stats at Baseball Reference

Teams
- San Diego Padres (2002); Macoto Cobras (2005)

Kevin Patrick Pickford (born March 12, 1975) is an American former Major League Baseball pitcher. He played during one season at the major league level for the San Diego Padres. He was initially offered a scholarship to Florida State. He was drafted by the Pittsburgh Pirates in the 2nd round of the 1993 amateur draft. Pickford played his first professional season with their Rookie league Gulf Coast Pirates in 1993, and his last with the San Francisco Giants' Triple-A Fresno Grizzlies in 2004. He batted .371 his final year of high school.
