= 2004 Atlantic Coast Conference baseball tournament =

American college baseball tournament

- 2004 ACC Baseball Championship Logo
- Teams: 9
- Format: Single-elimination play-in game Double-elimination tournament
- Finals site: Salem Memorial Baseball Stadium; Salem, VA
- Champions: Florida State Seminoles (4th title)
- Winning coach: Mike Martin (4th title)
- MVP: Shane Robinson (Florida State Seminoles)

2004 Atlantic Coast Conference baseball standings
	Conf.				Overall
Team	W		L	PCT	W		L	PCT
No. 11 Georgia Tech ‍†‍‍^{y}	18	–	5	.783	44	–	21	.677
No. 20 Virginia ‍‍‍^{y}	18	–	6	.750	44	–	15	.746
No. 14 Florida State ‍‍‡‍^{y}	16	–	8	.667	45	–	23	.662
No. 27 North Carolina ^{y} ‍‍‍	14	–	10	.583	43	–	21	.672
No. 26 Clemson ‍‍‍^{y}	14	–	10	.583	39	–	26	.600
NC State ‍‍‍^{y}	11	–	12	.478	36	–	24	.600
Duke ‍‍‍	8	–	16	.333	25	–	31	.446
Maryland ‍‍‍	4	–	20	.167	22	–	34	.393
Wake Forest ‍‍‍	4	–	20	.167	17	–	33	.340
† – Conference champion ‡ – Tournament champion y – Invited to the NCAA tournament As of June 30, 2004; Rankings from Collegiate Baseball

The 2004 Atlantic Coast Conference baseball tournament was held at the Salem Memorial Baseball Stadium in Salem, Virginia, from May 25 through 30. Florida State won the tournament and earned the Atlantic Coast Conference's automatic bid to the 2004 NCAA Division I baseball tournament.

== Tournament ==
The two teams with the worst records in regular season conference play faced each other in a single elimination situation to earn the 8th spot in the conference tournament.

Play-in game	Upper round 1	Upper round 2	Upper final	Final
1	Georgia Tech	4
8	Wake Forest	12	9	Maryland	3
1	Georgia Tech	11
9	Maryland	15
4	Clemson	7
4	Clemson	7
5	North Carolina	6
1	Georgia Tech	13
3	Florida State	7
2	Virginia	5
7	Duke	6
7	Duke	3
3	Florida State	6
3	Florida State	6
6	NC State	5	1	Georgia Tech	7	5
3	Florida State	8	17
Lower round 1	Lower round 2	Lower round 3	Lower final
7	Duke	2
5	North Carolina	14	5	North Carolina	20	3	Florida State	8
9	Maryland	0	5	North Carolina	6	5	North Carolina	7
4	Clemson	5
4	Clemson	12
2	Virginia	5	6	NC State	9
6	NC State	6

== All-Tournament Team ==
Position	Player	School
1B	Sammy Hewitt	North Carolina
2B	Travis Storrer	Clemson
3B	Brad McCann	Clemson
SS	Stephen Drew	Florida State
C	Chris Iannetta	North Carolina
OF	Clifton Remole	Georgia Tech
OF	Shane Robinson	Florida State
OF	Marshall Hubbard	North Carolina
DH	Eddy Martinez-Esteve	Florida State
P	Gary Bakker	North Carolina
P	Mark Sauls	Florida State
MVP	Shane Robinson	Florida State

(*)Denotes Unanimous Selection

== See also ==
- College World Series
- NCAA Division I Baseball Championship
