= Danville 97s =

- 1998; Danville, Virginia

Minor league affiliations
- Class: Class A-Advanced (1998)
- League: Carolina League (1998)

Major league affiliations
- Team: Atlanta Braves (1998)

Minor league titles
- League titles: none

Team data
- Name: Danville 97s (1998)
- Ballpark: American Legion Field (1998)

The Danville 97s were a minor league baseball team based in Danville, Virginia for the 1998 season only. They were a baseball team that played in the Carolina League and were affiliated with the Atlanta Braves for their lone 1998 season. Prior to the 97s, the Durham Bulls were the Braves High-A affiliate from 1980–1997 which that team also played in the Carolina League. The 97s played home games at the American Legion Field. Following the 1998 season, the franchise relocated to Myrtle Beach, South Carolina, to become the Myrtle Beach Pelicans.

Previously, Danville has also been the home of various minor league teams known as the Danville Leafs, and it is currently home to the Danville Braves of the Advanced Rookie-Level Appalachian League.

== History ==
In 1998, Durham, North Carolina was one of two cities added to Triple-A baseball, joining the International League as an expansion team affiliated with the Tampa Bay Devil Rays. The new IL club would carry forward the identity of the city's long-time Carolina League franchise, the Durham Bulls, an identity given international recognition by the 1988 movie Bull Durham. Capitol Broadcasting Company of Raleigh would own the new Triple-A franchise as they had the Single-A club. The Carolina League franchise still owned by CBC would have to relocate; though it would leave its history behind in Durham, it would (for the time being) retain a valuable affiliation agreement with the Atlanta Braves in its new home. The two strongest initial contenders were Myrtle Beach and Williamsburg, Virginia. Williamsburg would not have a suitable facility for the 1998 season; Danville, firmly within the existing league footprint and already housing a rookie-league Braves affiliate, developed a plan to house the team temporarily should Williamsburg be chosen.

By October 1997, the Bulls' ownership group selected Myrtle Beach as the destination and the Carolina League approved the relocation. By that late date, however, Myrtle Beach was also unable to complete its new stadium in time for the 1998 season. After an agreement was reached with the Appalachian League, necessary as the team would share its stadium with the Danville Braves for the entire Appy League season and half the Carolina League schedule, the Bulls announced Danville as the temporary home for the CL franchise. The city's previously developed plan and the Braves organization's familiarity with the Danville community carried the decision.

On October 21, 1997, the team name "Danville 97s" was announced. The name pays tribute to the victims of the infamous Wreck of the Old 97, which had the reputation as the fastest regularly scheduled train in the world at the time of its fatal wreck in 1903.

The 97s would finish last in the Carolina League during their lone season in Danville in 1998, when Jason Marquis began the season as the youngest pitcher in the Carolina League, but won only 2 of 22 starts for Danville, as he went 2–12 and struck out 135 in 114.2 innings, while walking only 41. The team completed its move to Myrtle Beach for the 1999 season, becoming the Myrtle Beach Pelicans.

== Season-by-season results ==
Year	Name	League	Level	Affiliation	Record	Manager	Playoffs
1998	97s	Carolina	High-A	Atlanta Braves	58–82	Paul Runge	
