= Salem Memorial Ballpark =

Baseball park in Salem, Virginia

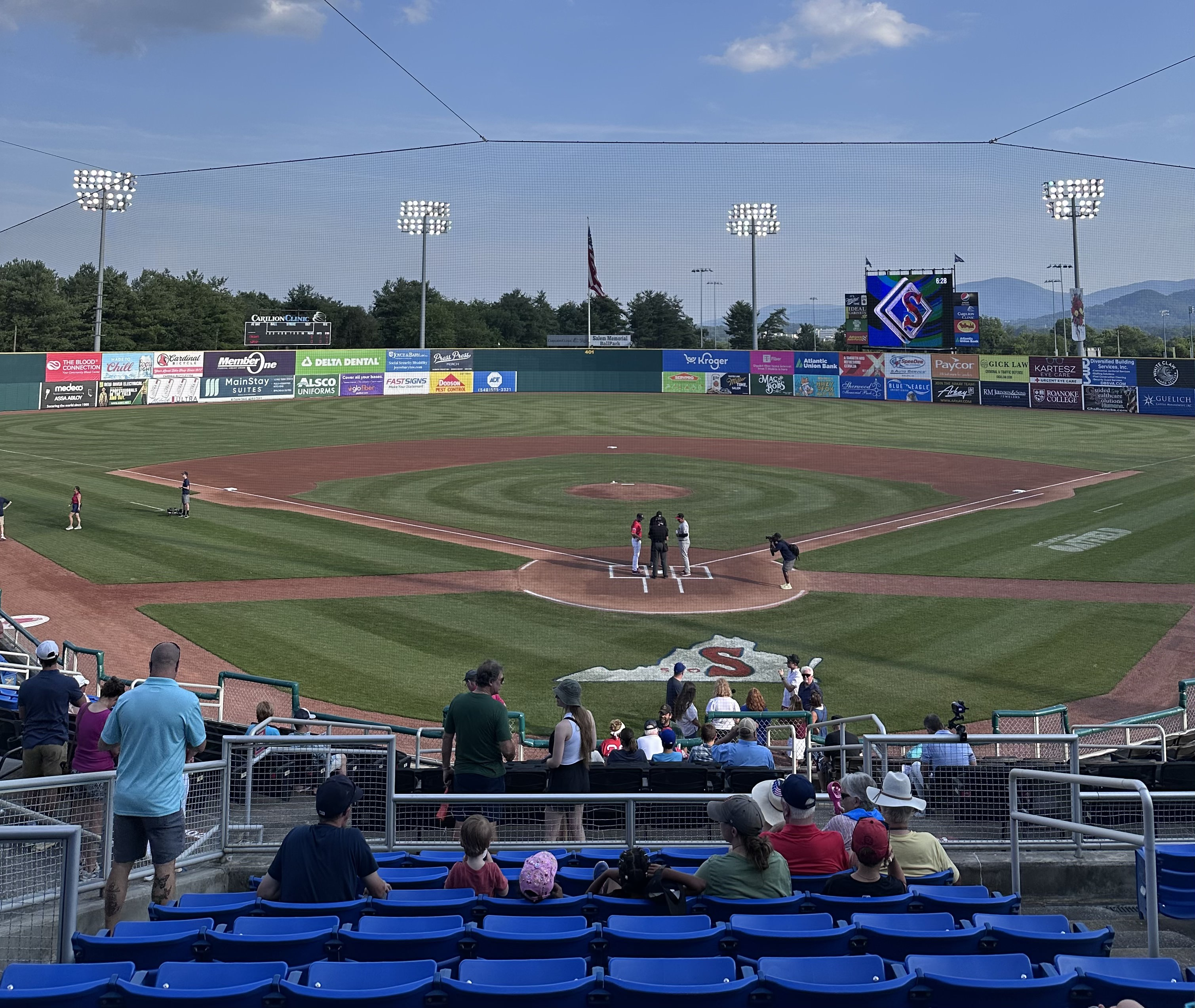
- Ballpark interior June 2025
- Interactive map of Salem Memorial Ballpark
- Full name: Carilion Clinic Field at Salem Memorial Ballpark
- Former names: Haley Toyota Field at Salem Memorial Ballpark (2017–2021); Lewis Gale Field at Salem Memorial Ballpark (2009–2017); Salem Memorial Baseball Stadium (1995–2006)
- Location: 1004 Texas Street; Salem, Virginia
- Coordinates: 37°17′7″N 80°2′12″W
- Owner: City of Salem
- Operator: Salem Civic Center
- Capacity: 6,300
- Surface: Grass
- Field size: Left Field: 325 feet (99 m); Center Field: 401 feet (122 m); Right Field: 325 feet (99 m)

Construction
- Groundbreaking: September 27, 1994
- Opened: August 7, 1995
- Cost: $10.1 million ($21.3 million in 2025 dollars)
- Architects: Kinsey Shane & Associates
- General contractors: J.M. Turner & Company

Tenants
- Salem RidgeYaks (CL) 1995–present; Roanoke Maroons (ODAC) 2002–present

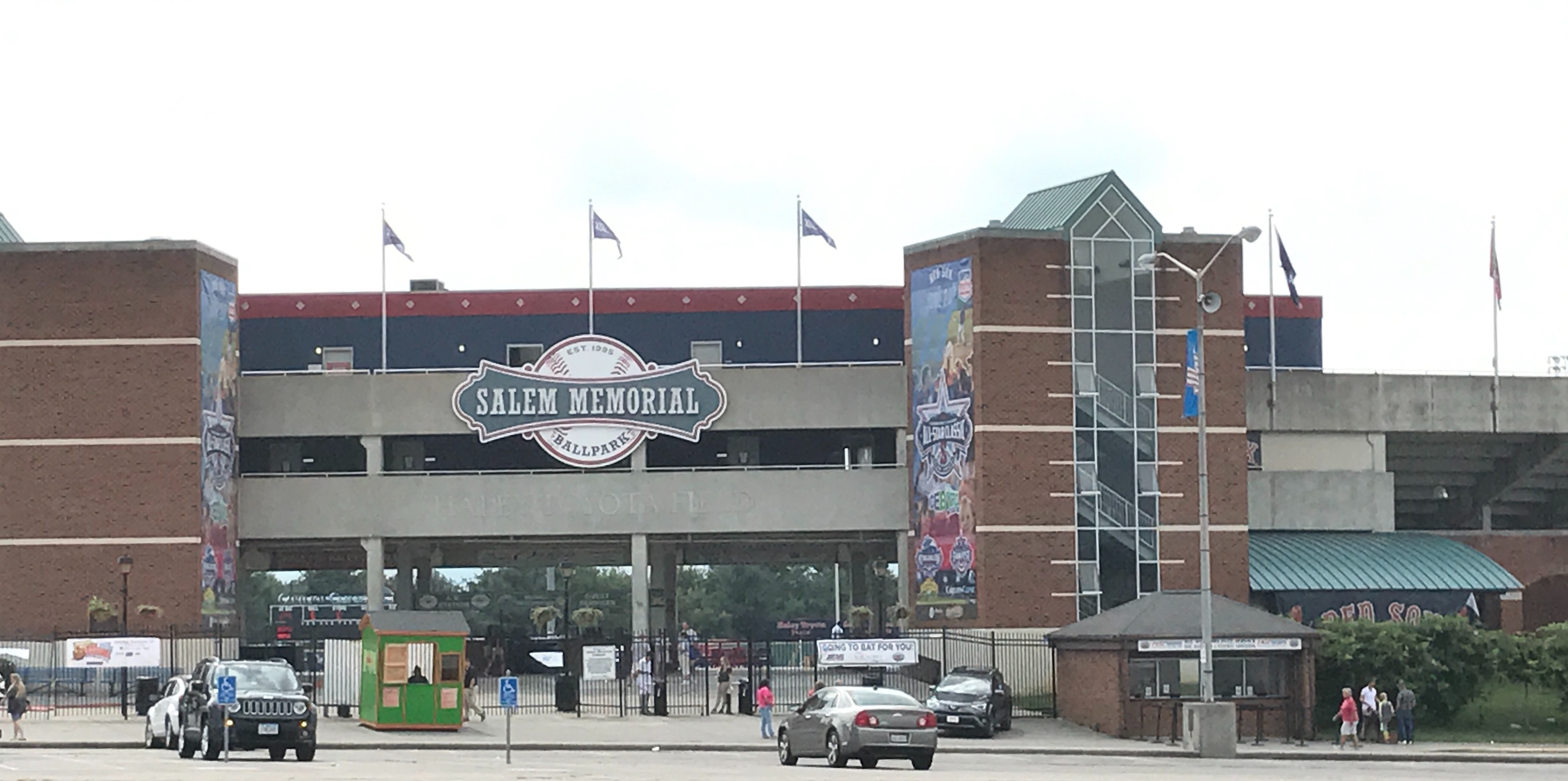
Ballpark exterior in 2017

Salem Memorial Ballpark is a baseball park in Salem, Virginia. It is part of the James E. Taliferro Sports and Entertainment Complex, along with the Salem Civic Center and Salem Football Stadium, located approximately 1 mile (1.6 km) southeast of downtown. Opened on August 7, 1995, it is home to the Salem RidgeYaks, a Minor League Baseball affiliate of the Boston Red Sox who play in the Carolina League. It was built in 1995 at a cost of $10.1 million to replace Municipal Stadium. With a seating capacity of 6,300 people, it offers an view of the Blue Ridge Mountains. For sponsorship reasons, since 2021 the full name of the facility has been Carilion Clinic Field at Salem Memorial Ballpark, named after local healthcare organization Carilion Clinic.

== History ==
In 1993, ownership of the then Salem Buccaneers were looking to sell the franchise. As the existing Municipal Stadium was not adequate to meet the needs of the franchise, Salem leaders looked at options to construct a new stadium in an effort to keep the franchise from relocating. In January 1994, Salem leaders approached both the City of Roanoke and Roanoke County in an effort to develop a regional partnership to construct a stadium. In March 1994, the Salem City Council decided a nonbinding referendum would be held later that summer to let the city residents decide if a new facility should be constructed. On July 19, Salem voters voted in favor of constructing a new ballpark with 2,236 people voting for and 398 voting against the proposal. With its citizens strongly supporting its construction, the Salem City Council voted unanimously on July 25 to approve construction of a new stadium.

In August, final designs were unveiled by Kinsey Shane & Associates, with J.M. Turner & Company selected as general contractor for construction of the $5 million ballpark. Its construction was to occur on property already under the ownership of the city adjacent to both the Salem Civic Center and Salem Football Stadium. The playing field was to be set first followed by the construction of the physical stadium with precast concrete. The facility was tentatively scheduled for completion for the start of the 1995 season. As a result of its construction, in September, ownership signed an agreement with the Colorado Rockies to serve as their Single-A team beginning in 1995. The choice was made in large part based on the construction of the new stadium.

Although budgeted to be completed for $5 million, in November Salem approved an additional $1 million to be spent on stadium construction. The following April, costs again rose to $10.1 million for its completion primarily as a result of low construction estimates. Slated to open for the start of the 1995 season, its opening was pushed back to May 22 then to June 20 and July 25 due to construction delays. On August 7, the stadium opened before a standing-room only crowd of 6,421 with the newly renamed Salem Avalanche defeating the Frederick Keys, 3–2 in 15 innings.

The venue hosted the 2003 and 2004 Atlantic Coast Conference baseball tournaments, won by Georgia Tech and Florida State, respectively.

The capacity was reduced from 6,300 to 4,968 for the 2009 season when the new Boston Red Sox ownership decided to place tarps over four sections of the general admission seats in an effort to create a more "intimate" fan experience. Due to increased attendance, two of the four tarps were removed towards the end of the 2010 season to expand the stadiums' capacity to 5,503.

== Notable events ==
=== All-Star Game ===
On March 3, 2005, Salem Avalanche officials announced that Salem Memorial Baseball Stadium was selected to play host to the 2006 Carolina-California League All-Star Game. Before a crowd of 5,133, and live television and radio audiences, the team of Carolina League All-Stars defeated the team of California League All-Stars by a score of 6-3. Chad Reineke (Carolina – Salem Avalanche) was the winning pitcher, Rodrigo Escobar (Carolina – Salem Avalanche) earned a save, and José Arredondo (California – Rancho Cucamonga Quakes) was the losing pitcher. Both teams awarded a "Top Star," with each earning a place in the XM Satellite Radio All-Star Futures Game at the 2006 Major League Baseball All-Star Game. The selection from the Carolina League was Nolan Reimold (Frederick Keys), and Reid Brignac (Visalia Oaks) was selected from the California League. Justin Hedrick (California – San Jose Giants) was named Pitcher of the Game.

Salem also hosted the 2017 Carolina League All-Star Game, which featured a skills competition at Salem's old ballpark as part of a celebration of Salem's 50th anniversary in the Carolina League. The Northern Division All-Stars defeated the Southern Division All-Stars, 2–0. Salem third baseman Michael Chavis, whose two-run double in the first inning scored the only runs of the night, received the MVP Award.

=== No-hitters ===
Salem Memorial Ballpark has been the setting for three no-hit games since its opening in 1995. The first took place on August 4, 1996, when Luther Hackman pitched a 4–1 no-hit game against the Kinston Indians. The second took place on April 10, 1997, when Scott Randall and Lariel González combined to pitch a 1–0 no-hit game against the Wilmington Blue Rocks. The third took place on June 30, 2010, when Nathan Moreau of the Frederick Keys pitched a 7–0 no-hit game against the Red Sox.

No.	Date	Pitcher(s)	Teams		Score
No.	Date	Pitcher(s)	Visitor	Home	Score
1	August 4, 1996	Luther Hackman	Kinston Indians	Salem Avalanche^{†}	4–1
2	April 10, 1997	Scott Randall; Lariel González	Wilmington Blue Rocks	Salem Avalanche^{†}	1–0
3	June 30, 2010	Nathan Moreau	Frederick Keys^{†}	Salem Red Sox	7–0
(†) Pitched a no-hitter and won

=== College baseball ===
In addition to serving as a second home field for the Roanoke College baseball team since 2002, Salem Memorial Ballpark has hosted several collegiate tournaments since 1996. In July 1994, city officials announced that the NCAA Division III (D-III) Baseball Championship would be played at the then proposed stadium for five years between 1995 and 1999. Although scheduled to be played in the new ballpark, in April 1995 city officials announced the D-III Baseball Championship would be moved to nearby Municipal Field as a result of construction delays on the new facility. Due to sagging attendance, in 1998 the NCAA announced the D-III Baseball Championship would be moved to Fox Cities Stadium outside Appleton, Wisconsin, beginning with the 2000 tournament.

D-III Baseball Championship at Salem Memorial Ballpark
Season	Winning head coach	Teams		Score
Season	Winning head coach	Champion	Runner-up	Score
1996	Jeff Albies	William Paterson	Cal Lutheran	6–5
1997	Ed Flaherty	Southern Maine	Wooster	15–1
1998	Bill Holowaty	Eastern Connecticut State	Montclair State	16–1
1999	Charlie Long	North Carolina Wesleyan	St. Thomas	1–0

In December 2001, the City of Salem was notified of their successful bid against both Durham Bulls Athletic Park in Durham and L. P. Frans Stadium in Hickory to host both the 2003 and 2004 ACC baseball tournaments. The 2003 tournament saw 18,276 attend the event with Georgia Tech defeating NC State by a score of 6–5. The 2004 tournament saw 23,092 attend the event with Florida State defeating Georgia Tech, 17–5.

== Facilities ==
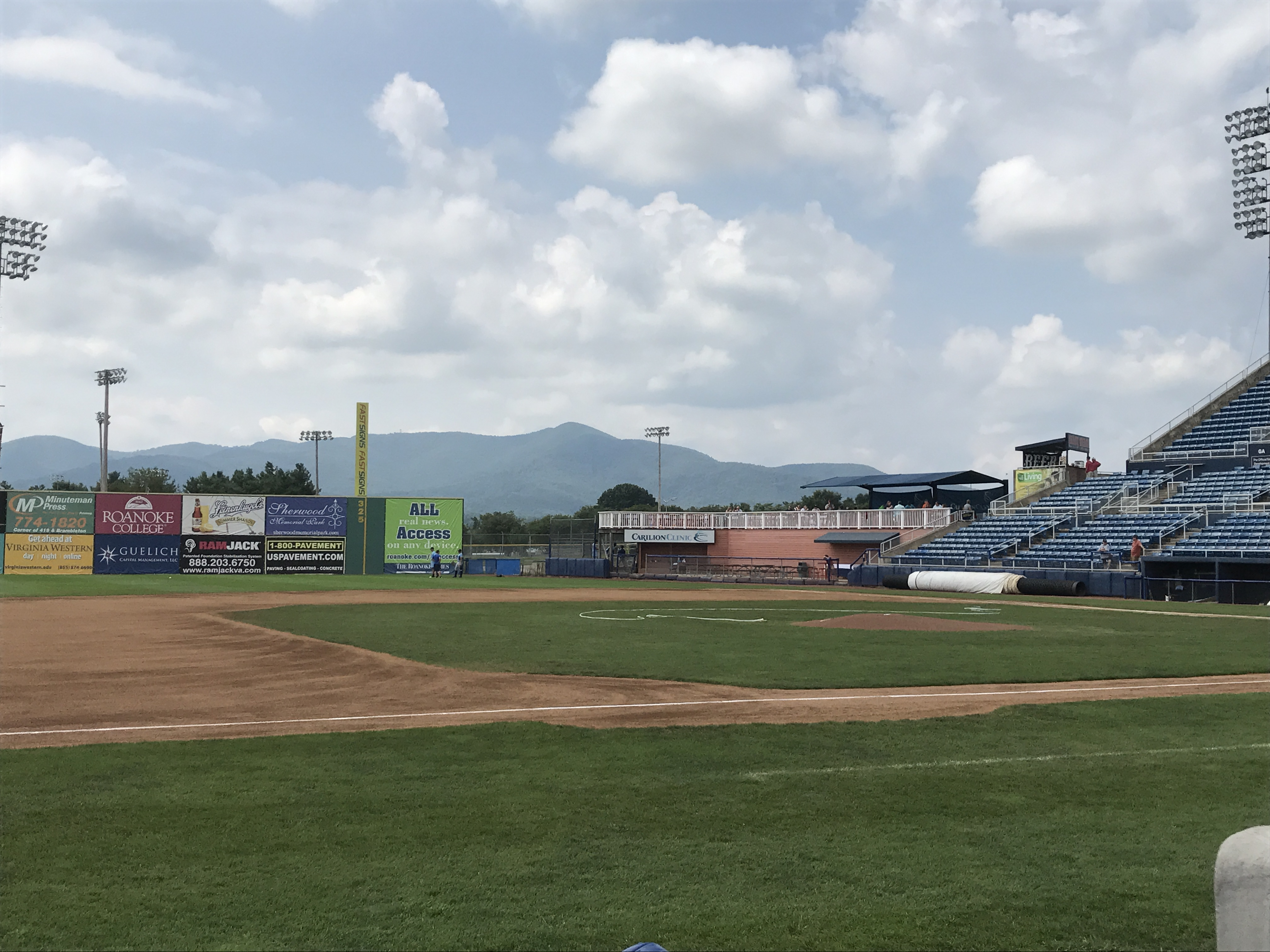
The view of the Blue Ridge Mountains from the third base line at Salem Memorial Ballpark

Seating at the ballpark includes fixed stadium seats and ten luxury boxes located above the main concourse behind home plate. As of 2011, fixed seating capacity is 5,503. Games can be watched from one of two picnic areas — one on the third base line and one on the first base line.

The stadium features four concession stands, numerous other carts, and eight large restrooms. There is ample free parking on site which is accessed from U.S. 11, U.S. 460, Virginia 419, and Interstate 81. In part because of promotions, the Salem minor league baseball teams have been more successful in building and maintaining attendance than Roanoke Valley's other minor league sports teams.

== Naming ==
In May 1995, the Salem City Council unanimously voted to name the ballpark Salem Memorial Ballpark in honor of Salem's veterans. The name was the suggestion of then mayor Jim Taliaferro, with the American Legion donating $5,500 for the memorial dedicated inside the stadium. In 2006, the naming rights of the stadium were sold to the Salem-based LewisGale Regional Health System, which retained them for eleven seasons. In 2017, naming rights were acquired by Haley Toyota of Roanoke.
