= 2015 Carolina League season =

- League: Carolina League
- Sport: Baseball
- Duration: April 9 – September 7
- Number of games: 140
- Number of teams: 8

Regular season
- Season MVP: Nellie Rodríguez, Lynchburg Hillcats

Playoffs
- League champions: Myrtle Beach Pelicans
- Runners-up: Wilmington Blue Rocks

CL seasons
- ← 2014 2016 →

The 2015 Carolina League was a Class A-Advanced baseball season played between April 9 and September 7. Eight teams played a 140-game schedule, with two teams from each division competing in the playoffs.

The Myrtle Beach Pelicans won the Carolina League championship, defeating the Wilmington Blue Rocks in the final round of the playoffs.

== Team changes ==
- The Carolina Mudcats ended their affiliation with the Cleveland Indians and began a new affiliation with the Atlanta Braves.
- The Lynchburg Hillcats ended their affiliation with the Atlanta Braves and began a new affiliation with the Cleveland Indians.
- The Myrtle Beach Pelicans ended their affiliation with the Texas Rangers and began a new affiliation with the Chicago Cubs.

== Teams ==
2015 Carolina League
Division	Team	City	MLB Affiliate	Stadium
North	Frederick Keys	Frederick, Maryland	Baltimore Orioles	Harry Grove Stadium
North	Lynchburg Hillcats	Lynchburg, Virginia	Cleveland Indians	Calvin Falwell Field
North	Potomac Nationals	Woodbridge, Virginia	Washington Nationals	G. Richard Pfitzner Stadium
North	Wilmington Blue Rocks	Wilmington, Delaware	Kansas City Royals	Daniel S. Frawley Stadium
South	Carolina Mudcats	Zebulon, North Carolina	Atlanta Braves	Five County Stadium
South	Myrtle Beach Pelicans	Myrtle Beach, South Carolina	Chicago Cubs	TicketReturn.com Field
South	Salem Red Sox	Salem, Virginia	Boston Red Sox	Lewis Gale Field
South	Winston-Salem Dash	Winston-Salem, North Carolina	Chicago White Sox	BB&T Ballpark

== Map of teams ==
North division South division

== Regular season ==
=== Summary ===
- The Myrtle Beach Pelicans finished with the best record in the league for the second consecutive season.

=== Standings ===
North division
Team	Win	Loss	%	GB
Lynchburg Hillcats	72	68	.514	–
Potomac Nationals	65	74	.468	6.5
Frederick Keys	64	76	.457	8
Wilmington Blue Rocks	62	77	.446	9.5
South division
Myrtle Beach Pelicans	81	57	.587	–
Winston-Salem Dash	75	63	.543	6
Carolina Mudcats	71	68	.511	10.5
Salem Red Sox	66	73	.475	15.5

== League Leaders ==
=== Batting leaders ===
Stat	Player	Total
AVG	Chesny Young, Myrtle Beach Pelicans	.321
H	Clint Frazier, Lynchburg Hillcats	143
R	Adam Engel, Winston-Salem Dash	90
2B	Clint Frazier, Lynchburg Hillcats	36
3B	Ivan Castillo, Lynchburg Hillcats	12
HR	Nellie Rodríguez, Lynchburg Hillcats	17
RBI	Nellie Rodríguez, Lynchburg Hillcats	84
SB	Adam Engel, Winston-Salem Dash	65

=== Pitching leaders ===
Stat	Player	Total
W	Matt Heidenreich, Winston-Salem Dash	12
ERA	Nick Pivetta, Potomac Nationals	2.29
SV	Cody Wheeler, Frederick Keys	17
SO	Mitch Horacek, Frederick Keys	146
IP	Jakob Junis, Wilmington Blue Rocks	155.2

== Playoffs ==
- The Myrtle Beach Pelicans won their third Carolina League championship, defeating the Wilmington Blue Rocks in three games.

=== Playoff bracket ===
Semi-finals
N1	Lynchburg	0
N2	Wilmington	2
S1	Myrtle Beach	2
S2	Winston-Salem	1

Finals
N2	Wilmington	0
S1	Myrtle Beach	3

== Awards ==
Carolina League awards
Award name	Recipient
Most Valuable Player	Nellie Rodríguez, Lynchburg Hillcats
Pitcher of the Year	Matt Heidenreich, Winston-Salem Dash
Manager of the Year	Mark Johnson, Myrtle Beach Pelicans

== See also ==
- 2015 Major League Baseball season
