= 2016 Carolina League season =

- League: Carolina League
- Sport: Baseball
- Duration: April 9 – September 7
- Games: 140
- Teams: 8

Regular season
- Season MVP: Bobby Bradley, Lynchburg Hillcats

Playoffs
- League champions: Myrtle Beach Pelicans
- Runners-up: Lynchburg Hillcats

CL seasons
- ← 2015 2017 →

The 2016 Carolina League was a Class A-Advanced baseball season played between April 9 and September 7. Eight teams played a 140-game schedule, with two teams from each division competing in the playoffs.

The Myrtle Beach Pelicans won the Carolina League championship, defeating the Lynchburg Hillcats in the final round of the playoffs.

== Teams ==
2016 Carolina League
Division	Team	City	MLB Affiliate	Stadium
North	Frederick Keys	Frederick, Maryland	Baltimore Orioles	Harry Grove Stadium
North	Lynchburg Hillcats	Lynchburg, Virginia	Cleveland Indians	Calvin Falwell Field
North	Potomac Nationals	Woodbridge, Virginia	Washington Nationals	G. Richard Pfitzner Stadium
North	Wilmington Blue Rocks	Wilmington, Delaware	Kansas City Royals	Daniel S. Frawley Stadium
South	Carolina Mudcats	Zebulon, North Carolina	Atlanta Braves	Five County Stadium
South	Myrtle Beach Pelicans	Myrtle Beach, South Carolina	Chicago Cubs	TicketReturn.com Field
South	Salem Red Sox	Salem, Virginia	Boston Red Sox	Lewis Gale Field
South	Winston-Salem Dash	Winston-Salem, North Carolina	Chicago White Sox	BB&T Ballpark

== Map of teams ==
North division South division

== Regular season ==
=== Summary ===
- The Salem Red Sox finished with the best record in the league for the first time since 1987.

=== Standings ===
North division
Team	Win	Loss	%	GB
Lynchburg Hillcats	84	56	.600	–
Potomac Nationals	73	65	.529	10
Frederick Keys	68	72	.486	16
Wilmington Blue Rocks	54	84	.391	29
South division
Salem Red Sox	87	52	.626	–
Myrtle Beach Pelicans	82	57	.590	5
Winston-Salem Dash	56	83	.403	31
Carolina Mudcats	52	87	.374	35

== League Leaders ==
=== Batting leaders ===
Stat	Player	Total
AVG	David Bote, Myrtle Beach Pelicans	.337
H	Mason Robbins, Winston-Salem Dash	159
R	Greg Allen, Lynchburg Hillcats	93
2B	Anthony Santander, Lynchburg Hillcats	42
3B	Danny Mars, Salem Red Sox	10
HR	Aderlin Rodríguez, Frederick Keys	26
RBI	Yasiel Balaguert, Myrtle Beach Pelicans	96
SB	Jay Gonzalez, Frederick Keys	41

=== Pitching leaders ===
Stat	Player	Total
W	Sean Brady, Lynchburg Hillcats; Jonathan Martinez, Myrtle Beach Pelicans	12
ERA	Matthew Grimes, Frederick Keys	1.45
SV	Ryan Brinley, Potomac Nationals	16
SO	Jordan Stephens, Winston-Salem Dash	155
IP	Matt Kent, Salem Red Sox	156.0

== Playoffs ==
- The Myrtle Beach Pelicans won their fourth Carolina League championship, defeating the Lynchburg Hillcats in four games.

=== Playoff bracket ===
Semi-finals
N1	Lynchburg	2
N2	Potomac	1
S1	Salem	1
S2	Myrtle Beach	2

Finals
N1	Lynchburg	1
S2	Myrtle Beach	3

== Awards ==
Carolina League awards
Award name	Recipient
Most Valuable Player	Bobby Bradley, Lynchburg Hillcats
Pitcher of the Year	Trevor Clifton, Myrtle Beach Pelicans
Manager of the Year	Mark Budzinski, Lynchburg Hillcats

== See also ==
- 2016 Major League Baseball season
