= 2018 Carolina League season =

- League: Carolina League
- Sport: Baseball
- Duration: April 5 – September 3
- Number of games: 140
- Number of teams: 10

Regular season
- Season MVP: Bobby Dalbec, Salem Red Sox

Playoffs
- League champions: Buies Creek Astros
- Runners-up: Potomac Nationals

CL seasons
- ← 2017 2019 →

The 2018 Carolina League was a Class A-Advanced baseball season played between April 5 and September 3. Ten teams played a 140-game schedule, with two teams from each division competing in the playoffs.

The Buies Creek Astros won the Carolina League championship, defeating the Potomac Nationals in the final round.

== Teams ==
2018 Carolina League
Division	Team	City	MLB Affiliate	Stadium
North	Frederick Keys	Frederick, Maryland	Baltimore Orioles	Harry Grove Stadium
North	Lynchburg Hillcats	Lynchburg, Virginia	Cleveland Indians	Calvin Falwell Field
North	Potomac Nationals	Woodbridge, Virginia	Washington Nationals	Northwest Federal Field at Pfitzner Stadium
North	Salem Red Sox	Salem, Virginia	Boston Red Sox	Haley Toyota Field
North	Wilmington Blue Rocks	Wilmington, Delaware	Kansas City Royals	Daniel S. Frawley Stadium
South	Buies Creek Astros	Buies Creek, North Carolina	Houston Astros	Jim Perry Stadium
South	Carolina Mudcats	Zebulon, North Carolina	Milwaukee Brewers	Five County Stadium
South	Down East Wood Ducks	Kinston, North Carolina	Texas Rangers	Grainger Stadium
South	Myrtle Beach Pelicans	Myrtle Beach, South Carolina	Chicago Cubs	TicketReturn.com Field
South	Winston-Salem Dash	Winston-Salem, North Carolina	Chicago White Sox	BB&T Ballpark

== Map of teams ==
North division South division

== Regular season ==
=== Summary ===
- The Winston-Salem Dash finished with the best record in the league for the first time since 2012.

=== Standings ===
North division
Team	Win	Loss	%	GB
Potomac Nationals	74	62	.544	–
Lynchburg Hillcats	71	66	.518	3.5
Wilmington Blue Rocks	68	72	.486	8
Frederick Keys	65	72	.474	9.5
Salem Red Sox	63	75	.457	12
South division
Winston-Salem Dash	84	54	.609	–
Buies Creek Astros	80	57	.584	3.5
Carolina Mudcats	65	73	.471	19
Myrtle Beach Pelicans	61	78	.439	23.5
Down East Wood Ducks	59	81	.421	26

== League Leaders ==
=== Batting leaders ===
Stat	Player	Total
AVG	Ryan McKenna, Frederick Keys	.377
H	Osvaldo Duarte, Buies Creek Astros	134
R	Blake Perkins, Potomac / Wilmington	87
2B	Gabriel Cancel, Wilmington Blue Rocks; Brett Netzer, Salem Red Sox	31
3B	Osvaldo Duarte, Buies Creek Astros; Blake Rutherford, Winston-Salem Dash	9
HR	Bobby Dalbec, Salem Red Sox	26
RBI	Bobby Dalbec, Salem Red Sox	85
SB	D.J. Burt, Wilmington Blue Rocks	32

=== Pitching leaders ===
Stat	Player	Total
W	Cristian Alvarado, Frederick Keys	12
ERA	Cam Roegner, Carolina Mudcats	2.16
SV	Luke Barker, Carolina Mudcats	20
SO	Tyson Miller, Myrtle Beach Pelicans	126
IP	Cristian Alvarado, Frederick Keys	155.0

== Playoffs ==
- Due to Hurricane Florence, the final round of the playoffs was limited to only one game before the remainder of the series was canceled.
- The Buies Creek Astros won their first Carolina League championship, defeating the Potomac Nationals in one game.
- The semi-finals were changed from a best-of-three series to a best-of-five series.

=== Playoff bracket ===
Semi-finals
N1	Potomac	3
N2	Lynchburg	2
S1	Winston-Salem	0
S2	Buies Creek	3

Finals
N1	Potomac	0
S2	Buies Creek	1

== Awards ==
Carolina League awards
Award name	Recipient
Most Valuable Player	Bobby Dalbec, Salem Red Sox
Pitcher of the Year	Wil Crowe, Potomac Nationals
Manager of the Year	Omar Vizquel, Winston-Salem Dash

== See also ==
- 2018 Major League Baseball season
