= 2013 Carolina League season =

- League: Carolina League
- Sport: Baseball
- Duration: April 4 – September 2
- Number of games: 140
- Number of teams: 8

Regular season
- Season MVP: Chris Curley, Winston-Salem Dash

Playoffs
- League champions: Salem Red Sox
- Runners-up: Potomac Nationals

CL seasons
- ← 2012 2014 →

The 2013 Carolina League was a Class A-Advanced baseball season played between April 4 and September 2. Eight teams played a 140-game schedule, with two teams from each division competing in the playoffs.

The Salem Red Sox won the Carolina League championship, defeating the Potomac Nationals in the final round of the playoffs.

== Teams ==
2013 Carolina League
Division	Team	City	MLB Affiliate	Stadium
North	Frederick Keys	Frederick, Maryland	Baltimore Orioles	Harry Grove Stadium
North	Lynchburg Hillcats	Lynchburg, Virginia	Atlanta Braves	Calvin Falwell Field
North	Potomac Nationals	Woodbridge, Virginia	Washington Nationals	G. Richard Pfitzner Stadium
North	Wilmington Blue Rocks	Wilmington, Delaware	Kansas City Royals	Daniel S. Frawley Stadium
South	Carolina Mudcats	Zebulon, North Carolina	Cleveland Indians	Five County Stadium
South	Myrtle Beach Pelicans	Myrtle Beach, South Carolina	Texas Rangers	TicketReturn.com Field
South	Salem Red Sox	Salem, Virginia	Boston Red Sox	Lewis Gale Field
South	Winston-Salem Dash	Winston-Salem, North Carolina	Chicago White Sox	BB&T Ballpark

== Map of teams ==
North division South division

== Regular season ==
=== Summary ===
- The Potomac Nationals finished with the best record in the league for the first time in team history.

=== Standings ===
North division
Team	Win	Loss	%	GB
Potomac Nationals	84	55	.604	–
Lynchburg Hillcats	69	70	.496	15
Wilmington Blue Rocks	63	77	.450	21.5
Frederick Keys	61	78	.439	23
South division
Myrtle Beach Pelicans	77	62	.554	–
Salem Red Sox	76	64	.543	1.5
Winston-Salem Dash	71	69	.507	6.5
Carolina Mudcats	57	83	.407	20.5

== League Leaders ==
=== Batting leaders ===
Stat	Player	Total
AVG	Mike Ohlman, Frederick Keys	.313
H	Jordan Smith, Carolina Mudcats	151
R	Chris Curley, Winston-Salem Dash	90
2B	Michael A. Taylor, Potomac Nationals	41
3B	Billy Burns, Potomac Nationals	9
HR	Chris Curley, Winston-Salem Dash	24
RBI	Chris Curley, Winston-Salem Dash	92
SB	Billy Burns, Potomac Nationals	54

=== Pitching leaders ===
Stat	Player	Total
W	Chris Beck, Winston-Salem Dash; Tim Berry, Frederick Keys; Bryan Blough, Winston-Salem Dash; Blake Schwartz, Potomac Nationals; Sam Selman, Wilmington Blue Rocks	11
ERA	Cody Anderson, Carolina Mudcats	2.34
SV	Nate Hyatt, Lynchburg Hillcats	12
SO	Alec Asher, Myrtle Beach Pelicans	139
IP	Bryan Blough, Winston-Salem Dash	172.2

== Playoffs ==
- The Salem Red Sox won their seventh Carolina League championship, defeating the Potomac Nationals in three games.

=== Playoff bracket ===
Semi-finals
N1	Potomac	2
N2	Lynchburg	0
S1	Salem	2
S2	Myrtle Beach	0

Finals
N1	Potomac	0
S1	Salem	3

== Awards ==
Carolina League awards
Award name	Recipient
Most Valuable Player	Chris Curley, Winston-Salem Dash
Pitcher of the Year	Cody Anderson, Carolina Mudcats
Manager of the Year	Jason Wood, Myrtle Beach Pelicans

== See also ==
- 2013 Major League Baseball season
