= 2019 Carolina League season =

- League: Carolina League
- Sport: Baseball
- Duration: April 4 – September 2
- Number of games: 140
- Number of teams: 10

Regular season
- Season MVP: Mario Feliciano, Carolina Mudcats

Playoffs
- League champions: Wilmington Blue Rocks
- Runners-up: Fayetteville Woodpeckers

CL seasons
- ← 2018 2020 →

The 2019 Carolina League was a Class A-Advanced baseball season played between April 4 and September 2. Ten teams played a 140-game schedule, with two teams from each division competing in the playoffs.

The Wilmington Blue Rocks won the Carolina League championship, defeating the Fayetteville Woodpeckers in the final round.

== Team changes ==
- The Buies Creek Astros relocated to Fayetteville, North Carolina, and were renamed the Fayetteville Woodpeckers. The club remained affiliated with the Houston Astros.

== Teams ==
2019 Carolina League
Division	Team	City	MLB Affiliate	Stadium
North	Frederick Keys	Frederick, Maryland	Baltimore Orioles	Harry Grove Stadium
North	Lynchburg Hillcats	Lynchburg, Virginia	Cleveland Indians	Calvin Falwell Field
North	Potomac Nationals	Woodbridge, Virginia	Washington Nationals	Northwest Federal Field at Pfitzner Stadium
North	Salem Red Sox	Salem, Virginia	Boston Red Sox	Haley Toyota Field
North	Wilmington Blue Rocks	Wilmington, Delaware	Kansas City Royals	Daniel S. Frawley Stadium
South	Carolina Mudcats	Zebulon, North Carolina	Milwaukee Brewers	Five County Stadium
South	Down East Wood Ducks	Kinston, North Carolina	Texas Rangers	Grainger Stadium
South	Fayetteville Woodpeckers	Fayetteville, North Carolina	Houston Astros	Segra Stadium
South	Myrtle Beach Pelicans	Myrtle Beach, South Carolina	Chicago Cubs	TicketReturn.com Field
South	Winston-Salem Dash	Winston-Salem, North Carolina	Chicago White Sox	BB&T Ballpark

== Map of teams ==
North division South division

== Regular season ==
=== Summary ===
- The Down East Wood Ducks finished with the best record in the league for the first time in team history.

=== Standings ===
North division
Team	Win	Loss	%	GB
Wilmington Blue Rocks	82	56	.594	–
Potomac Nationals	70	67	.511	11.5
Salem Red Sox	67	70	.489	14.5
Lynchburg Hillcats	62	73	.459	18.5
Frederick Keys	53	84	.387	28.5
South division
Down East Wood Ducks	87	52	.626	–
Winston-Salem Dash	72	61	.541	12
Fayetteville Woodpeckers	72	67	.518	15
Carolina Mudcats	65	74	.468	22
Myrtle Beach Pelicans	55	81	.404	30.5

== League Leaders ==
=== Batting leaders ===
Stat	Player	Total
AVG	Jarren Duran, Salem Red Sox	.387
H	Cole Freeman, Potomac Nationals	141
R	Cole Freeman, Potomac Nationals	82
2B	Aldrem Corredor, Potomac Nationals	34
3B	Craig Dedelow, Winston-Salem Dash	10
HR	Mario Feliciano, Carolina Mudcats	19
RBI	Aldrem Corredor, Potomac Nationals	89
SB	Brewer Hicklen, Wilmington Blue Rocks	39

=== Pitching leaders ===
Stat	Player	Total
W	Nelson Hernandez, Carolina Mudcats; Nick Raquet, Potomac Nationals; Paul Richan, Myrtle Beach Pelicans	11
ERA	Kris Bubic, Wilmington Blue Rocks	2.30
SV	Joe Kuzia, Down East Wood Ducks	18
SO	Shawn Dubin, Fayetteville Woodpeckers	132
IP	Daniel González, Salem Red Sox	150.2

== Playoffs ==
- The Wilmington Blue Rocks won their fifth Carolina League championship, defeating the Fayetteville Woodpeckers in five games.

=== Playoff bracket ===
Semi-finals
N1	Wilmington	3
N2	Salem	2
S1	Down East	2
S2	Fayetteville	3

Finals
N1	Wilmington	3
S2	Fayetteville	2

== Awards ==
Carolina League awards
Award name	Recipient
Most Valuable Player	Mario Feliciano, Carolina Mudcats
Pitcher of the Year	Noah Zavolas, Carolina Mudcats
Manager of the Year	Corey Ragsdale, Down East Wood Ducks

== See also ==
- 2019 Major League Baseball season
