= 2014 Carolina League season =

- League: Carolina League
- Sport: Baseball
- Duration: April 3 – September 1
- Number of games: 140
- Number of teams: 8

Regular season
- Season MVP: Joey Gallo, Myrtle Beach Pelicans

Playoffs
- League champions: Potomac Nationals
- Runners-up: Myrtle Beach Pelicans

CL seasons
- ← 2013 2015 →

The 2014 Carolina League was a Class A-Advanced baseball season played between April 3 and September 1. Eight teams played a 140-game schedule, with two teams from each division competing in the playoffs.

The Potomac Nationals won the Carolina League championship, defeating the Myrtle Beach Pelicans in the final round of the playoffs.

== Teams ==
2014 Carolina League
Division	Team	City	MLB Affiliate	Stadium
North	Frederick Keys	Frederick, Maryland	Baltimore Orioles	Harry Grove Stadium
North	Lynchburg Hillcats	Lynchburg, Virginia	Atlanta Braves	Calvin Falwell Field
North	Potomac Nationals	Woodbridge, Virginia	Washington Nationals	G. Richard Pfitzner Stadium
North	Wilmington Blue Rocks	Wilmington, Delaware	Kansas City Royals	Daniel S. Frawley Stadium
South	Carolina Mudcats	Zebulon, North Carolina	Cleveland Indians	Five County Stadium
South	Myrtle Beach Pelicans	Myrtle Beach, South Carolina	Texas Rangers	TicketReturn.com Field
South	Salem Red Sox	Salem, Virginia	Boston Red Sox	Lewis Gale Field
South	Winston-Salem Dash	Winston-Salem, North Carolina	Chicago White Sox	BB&T Ballpark

== Map of teams ==
North division South division

== Regular season ==
=== Summary ===
- The Myrtle Beach Pelicans finished with the best record in the league for the first time since 2008.

=== Standings ===
North division
Team	Win	Loss	%	GB
Potomac Nationals	78	58	.574	–
Lynchburg Hillcats	68	71	.489	11.5
Frederick Keys	65	72	.474	13.5
Wilmington Blue Rocks	65	72	.474	13.5
South division
Myrtle Beach Pelicans	82	56	.594	–
Salem Red Sox	68	68	.500	13
Carolina Mudcats	62	74	.456	19
Winston-Salem Dash	61	78	.439	21.5

== League Leaders ==
=== Batting leaders ===
Stat	Player	Total
AVG	Michael Burgess, Frederick Keys	.315
H	Matty Johnson, Salem Red Sox	141
R	Matty Johnson, Salem Red Sox	104
2B	Kevin Ahrens, Lynchburg Hillcats	41
3B	Christopher Garia, Myrtle Beach Pelicans	9
HR	Joey Gallo, Myrtle Beach Pelicans	21
RBI	Courtney Hawkins, Winston-Salem Dash	84
SB	Christopher Garia, Myrtle Beach Pelicans	45

=== Pitching leaders ===
Stat	Player	Total
W	Ryan Merritt, Carolina Mudcats	13
ERA	Glenn Sparkman, Wilmington Blue Rocks	1.56
SV	Alex Wilson, Lynchburg Hillcats	16
SO	Sean Manaea, Wilmington Blue Rocks	146
IP	Ryan Merritt, Carolina Mudcats	160.1

== Playoffs ==
- The Potomac Nationals won their fourth Carolina League championship, defeating the Myrtle Beach Pelicans in four games.

=== Playoff bracket ===
Semi-finals
N1	Potomac	2
N2	Lynchburg	0
S1	Myrtle Beach	2
S2	Salem	1

Finals
N1	Potomac	3
S1	Myrtle Beach	1

== Awards ==
Carolina League awards
Award name	Recipient
Most Valuable Player	Joey Gallo, Myrtle Beach Pelicans
Pitcher of the Year	Glenn Sparkman, Wilmington Blue Rocks
Manager of the Year	Tripp Keister, Potomac Nationals

== See also ==
- 2014 Major League Baseball season
