= 2017 Carolina League season =

- League: Carolina League
- Sport: Baseball
- Duration: April 6 – September 4
- Number of games: 140
- Number of teams: 10

Regular season
- Season MVP: Ademar Rifaela, Frederick Keys

Playoffs
- League champions: Down East Wood Ducks; Lynchburg Hillcats

CL seasons
- ← 2016 2018 →

The 2017 Carolina League was a Class A-Advanced baseball season played between April 6 and September 4. Ten teams played a 140-game schedule, with two teams from each division competing in the playoffs.

The Down East Wood Ducks and Lynchburg Hillcats were named co-champions of the Carolina League championship.

== Team changes ==
- The Buies Creek Astros joined the league as an expansion team and would join the South Division. The club began an affiliation with the Houston Astros.
- The Down East Wood Ducks joined the league as an expansion team and would join the South Division. The club began an affiliation with the Texas Rangers.
- The Salem Red Sox moved from the South Division to the North Division.
- The Carolina Mudcats ended their affiliation with the Atlanta Braves and began a new affiliation with the Milwaukee Brewers.

== Teams ==
2017 Carolina League
Division	Team	City	MLB Affiliate	Stadium
North	Frederick Keys	Frederick, Maryland	Baltimore Orioles	Harry Grove Stadium
North	Lynchburg Hillcats	Lynchburg, Virginia	Cleveland Indians	Calvin Falwell Field
North	Potomac Nationals	Woodbridge, Virginia	Washington Nationals	G. Richard Pfitzner Stadium
North	Salem Red Sox	Salem, Virginia	Boston Red Sox	Haley Toyota Field
North	Wilmington Blue Rocks	Wilmington, Delaware	Kansas City Royals	Daniel S. Frawley Stadium
South	Buies Creek Astros	Buies Creek, North Carolina	Houston Astros	Jim Perry Stadium
South	Carolina Mudcats	Zebulon, North Carolina	Milwaukee Brewers	Five County Stadium
South	Down East Wood Ducks	Kinston, North Carolina	Texas Rangers	Grainger Stadium
South	Myrtle Beach Pelicans	Myrtle Beach, South Carolina	Chicago Cubs	TicketReturn.com Field
South	Winston-Salem Dash	Winston-Salem, North Carolina	Chicago White Sox	BB&T Ballpark

== Map of teams ==
North division South division

== Regular season ==
=== Summary ===
- The Lynchburg Hillcats finished with the best record in the league for the first time since 1992.
- Despite finishing with the best record in the South Division, the Buies Creek Astros failed to qualify for the post-season, as they did not finish in first place in either half of the season.

=== Standings ===
North division
Team	Win	Loss	%	GB
Lynchburg Hillcats	87	52	.626	–
Salem Red Sox	73	66	.525	14
Frederick Keys	68	71	.489	19
Wilmington Blue Rocks	67	72	.482	20
Potomac Nationals	63	77	.450	24.5
South division
Buies Creek Astros	74	65	.532	–
Carolina Mudcats	73	65	.529	0.5
Myrtle Beach Pelicans	73	67	.521	1.5
Down East Wood Ducks	62	77	.446	12
Winston-Salem Dash	56	84	.400	18.5

== League Leaders ==
=== Batting leaders ===
Stat	Player	Total
AVG	Ryan Mountcastle, Frederick Keys	.314
H	Luis Yander, Down East Wood Ducks	139
R	Myles Straw, Buies Creek Astros	81
2B	Jake Gatewood, Carolina Mudcats	36
3B	Sam Haggerty, Lynchburg Hillcats	13
HR	Ademar Rifaela, Frederick Keys	24
RBI	Lucas Erceg, Carolina Mudcats	81
SB	Sam Haggerty, Lynchburg Hillcats	49

=== Pitching leaders ===
Stat	Player	Total
W	Triston McKenzie, Lynchburg Hillcats	12
ERA	Michael Rucker, Myrtle Beach Pelicans	2.51
SV	Nate Griep, Carolina Mudcats	30
SO	Triston McKenzie, Lynchburg Hillcats	186
IP	Matt Kent, Salem Red Sox	164.0

== Playoffs ==
- Due to Hurricane Irma, the final round of the playoffs was cancelled.
- The Down East Wood Ducks and Lynchburg Hillcats were named co-champions of the league.
- This was the first championship for the Down East Wood Ducks and the eighth championship for the Lynchburg Hillcats.

=== Playoff bracket ===
Semi-finals
N1	Lynchburg	2
N2	Frederick	1
S1	Myrtle Beach	0
S2	Down East	2

Finals
N1	Lynchburg
S2	Down East

== Awards ==
Carolina League awards
Award name	Recipient
Most Valuable Player	Ademar Rifaela, Frederick Keys
Pitcher of the Year	Triston McKenzie, Lynchburg Hillcats
Manager of the Year	Tony Mansolino, Frederick Keys

== See also ==
- 2017 Major League Baseball season
