= 2012 Carolina League season =

- League: Carolina League
- Sport: Baseball
- Duration: April 6 – September 3
- Number of games: 140
- Number of teams: 8

Regular season
- Season MVP: Dan Black, Winston-Salem Dash

Playoffs
- League champions: Lynchburg Hillcats
- Runners-up: Winston-Salem Dash

CL seasons
- ← 2011 2013 →

The 2012 Carolina League was a Class A-Advanced baseball season played between April 6 and September 3. Eight teams played a 140-game schedule, with two teams from each division competing in the playoffs.

The Lynchburg Hillcats won the Carolina League championship, defeating the Winston-Salem Dash in the final round of the playoffs.

== Team changes ==
- The Kinston Indians relocated to Zebulon, North Carolina and were renamed the Carolina Mudcats. The club remained affiliated with the Cleveland Indians.

== Teams ==
2012 Carolina League
Division	Team	City	MLB Affiliate	Stadium
North	Frederick Keys	Frederick, Maryland	Baltimore Orioles	Harry Grove Stadium
North	Lynchburg Hillcats	Lynchburg, Virginia	Atlanta Braves	Calvin Falwell Field
North	Potomac Nationals	Woodbridge, Virginia	Washington Nationals	G. Richard Pfitzner Stadium
North	Wilmington Blue Rocks	Wilmington, Delaware	Kansas City Royals	Daniel S. Frawley Stadium
South	Carolina Mudcats	Zebulon, North Carolina	Cleveland Indians	Five County Stadium
South	Myrtle Beach Pelicans	Myrtle Beach, South Carolina	Texas Rangers	TicketReturn.com Field
South	Salem Red Sox	Salem, Virginia	Boston Red Sox	Lewis Gale Field
South	Winston-Salem Dash	Winston-Salem, North Carolina	Chicago White Sox	BB&T Ballpark

== Map of teams ==
North division South division

== Regular season ==
=== Summary ===
- The Winston-Salem Dash finished with the best record in the league for the first time since 2010.

=== Standings ===
North division
Team	Win	Loss	%	GB
Lynchburg Hillcats	72	68	.514	–
Wilmington Blue Rocks	66	74	.471	6
Potomac Nationals	64	75	.460	7.5
Frederick Keys	62	77	.446	9.5
South division
Winston-Salem Dash	87	51	.630	–
Myrtle Beach Pelicans	74	65	.532	13.5
Salem Red Sox	68	69	.496	17.5
Carolina Mudcats	63	77	.450	25

== League Leaders ==
=== Batting leaders ===
Stat	Player	Total
AVG	Dan Black, Winston-Salem Dash	.315
H	Dan Black, Winston-Salem Dash	157
R	Nick Ahmed, Lynchburg Hillcats	84
2B	Nick Ahmed, Lynchburg Hillcats; Michael Almanzar, Salem Red Sox	36
3B	Tony Wolters, Carolina Mudcats	8
HR	Aaron Baker, Frederick Keys; Trayce Thompson, Winston-Salem Dash	22
RBI	Trayce Thompson, Winston-Salem Dash	90
SB	Nick Ahmed, Lynchburg Hillcats	40

=== Pitching leaders ===
Stat	Player	Total
W	Gus Schlosser, Lynchburg Hillcats	13
ERA	J.R. Graham, Lynchburg Hillcats	2.63
SV	Ben Rowen, Myrtle Beach Pelicans	19
SO	Aaron Northcraft, Lynchburg Hillcats	160
IP	Gus Schlosser, Lynchburg Hillcats	165.1

== Playoffs ==
- The Lynchburg Hillcats won their seventh Carolina League championship, defeating the Winston-Salem Dash in four games.
- The semi-finals were reduced from a best-of-five series to a best-of-three series.

=== Playoff bracket ===
Semi-finals
N1	Lynchburg	2
N2	Wilmington	1
S1	Winston-Salem	2
S2	Myrtle Beach	1

Finals
N1	Lynchburg	3
S1	Winston-Salem	1

== Awards ==
Carolina League awards
Award name	Recipient
Most Valuable Player	Dan Black, Winston-Salem Dash
Pitcher of the Year	Gus Schlosser, Lynchburg Hillcats
Manager of the Year	Tommy Thompson, Winston-Salem Dash

== See also ==
- 2012 Major League Baseball season
