= 2020 Carolina League season =

- League: Carolina League
- Sport: Baseball
- Teams: 10

Regular season

Playoffs
- League champions: Canceled

CL seasons
- ← 2019 2021 →

The 2020 Carolina League would have been a Class A-Advanced baseball season played between April 9 and September 7. Ten teams would have played a 140-game schedule, with two teams from each division competing in the playoffs.

The Carolina League was canceled due to the COVID-19 pandemic.

== Team changes ==
- The Potomac Nationals relocated to Fredericksburg, Virginia and were renamed the Fredericksburg Nationals. The club remained affiliated with the Washington Nationals.

== Teams ==
2020 Carolina League
Division	Team	City	MLB Affiliate	Stadium
North	Frederick Keys	Frederick, Maryland	Baltimore Orioles	Harry Grove Stadium
North	Fredericksburg Nationals	Fredericksburg, Virginia	Washington Nationals	FredNats Ballpark
North	Lynchburg Hillcats	Lynchburg, Virginia	Cleveland Indians	Bank of the James Stadium
North	Salem Red Sox	Salem, Virginia	Boston Red Sox	Haley Toyota Field
North	Wilmington Blue Rocks	Wilmington, Delaware	Kansas City Royals	Daniel S. Frawley Stadium
South	Carolina Mudcats	Zebulon, North Carolina	Milwaukee Brewers	Five County Stadium
South	Down East Wood Ducks	Kinston, North Carolina	Texas Rangers	Grainger Stadium
South	Fayetteville Woodpeckers	Fayetteville, North Carolina	Houston Astros	Segra Stadium
South	Myrtle Beach Pelicans	Myrtle Beach, South Carolina	Chicago Cubs	TicketReturn.com Field
South	Winston-Salem Dash	Winston-Salem, North Carolina	Chicago White Sox	BB&T Ballpark

== Map of teams ==
North division South division

== Regular season ==
- On March 13, Pat O'Conner, the president of Minor League Baseball, announced that the start of the season would be postponed due to the COVID-19 pandemic.
- On June 30, the season was canceled due to Major League Baseball announcing that it will not provide its affiliated minor league teams with players for the 2020 season.

== See also ==
- 2020 Major League Baseball season
