= 2011 Carolina League season =

- League: Carolina League
- Sport: Baseball
- Duration: April 7 – September 5
- Number of games: 140
- Number of teams: 8

Regular season
- Season MVP: Ian Gac, Winston-Salem Dash

Playoffs
- League champions: Frederick Keys
- Runners-up: Kinston Indians

CL seasons
- ← 2010 2012 →

The 2011 Carolina League was a Class A-Advanced baseball season played between April 7 and September 5. Eight teams played a 140-game schedule, with two teams from each division competing in the playoffs.

The Frederick Keys won the Carolina League championship, defeating the Kinston Indians in the final round of the playoffs.

== Team changes ==
- The Myrtle Beach Pelicans ended their affiliation with the Atlanta Braves and began a new affiliation with the Texas Rangers.
- The Lynchburg Hillcats ended their affiliation with the Cincinnati Reds and began a new affiliation with the Atlanta Braves.

== Teams ==
2011 Carolina League
Division	Team	City	MLB Affiliate	Stadium
North	Frederick Keys	Frederick, Maryland	Baltimore Orioles	Harry Grove Stadium
North	Lynchburg Hillcats	Lynchburg, Virginia	Atlanta Braves	Calvin Falwell Field
North	Potomac Nationals	Woodbridge, Virginia	Washington Nationals	G. Richard Pfitzner Stadium
North	Wilmington Blue Rocks	Wilmington, Delaware	Kansas City Royals	Daniel S. Frawley Stadium
South	Kinston Indians	Kinston, North Carolina	Cleveland Indians	Grainger Stadium
South	Myrtle Beach Pelicans	Myrtle Beach, South Carolina	Texas Rangers	BB&T Coastal Field
South	Salem Red Sox	Salem, Virginia	Boston Red Sox	Lewis Gale Field
South	Winston-Salem Dash	Winston-Salem, North Carolina	Chicago White Sox	BB&T Ballpark

== Map of teams ==
North division South division

== Regular season ==
=== Summary ===
- The Frederick Keys finished with the best record in the league for the first time since 2005.

=== Standings ===
North division
Team	Win	Loss	%	GB
Frederick Keys	80	59	.576	–
Potomac Nationals	68	71	.489	12
Wilmington Blue Rocks	66	72	.478	13.5
Lynchburg Hillcats	60	78	.435	19.5
South division
Kinston Indians	76	62	.551	–
Myrtle Beach Pelicans	72	67	.518	4.5
Winston-Salem Dash	69	71	.493	8
Salem Red Sox	64	75	.460	12.5

==== First half standings ====
North division
Team	Win	Loss	%	GB
Frederick Keys	41	28	.594	–
Wilmington Blue Rocks	36	33	.522	5
Lynchburg Hillcats	30	40	.429	11.5
Potomac Nationals	29	40	.420	12
South division
Myrtle Beach Pelicans	40	29	.580	–
Kinston Indians	38	31	.551	2
Winston-Salem Dash	32	38	.457	8.5
Salem Red Sox	31	38	.449	9

==== Second half standings ====
North division
Team	Win	Loss	%	GB
Potomac Nationals	39	31	.557	–
Frederick Keys	39	31	.557	–
Lynchburg Hillcats	30	38	.441	8
Wilmington Blue Rocks	30	39	.435	8.5
South division
Kinston Indians	38	31	.551	–
Winston-Salem Dash	37	33	.529	1.5
Salem Red Sox	33	37	.471	5.5
Myrtle Beach Pelicans	32	38	.457	6.5

== League Leaders ==
=== Batting leaders ===
Stat	Player	Total
AVG	José Martínez, Winston-Salem Dash	.314
H	Andrelton Simmons, Lynchburg Hillcats	161
R	Ian Gac, Winston-Salem Dash	91
2B	Joey Terdoslavich, Lynchburg Hillcats	52
3B	Tyler Saladino, Winston-Salem Dash; Ryan Strausborger, Myrtle Beach Pelicans	9
HR	Ian Gac, Winston-Salem Dash	33
RBI	Ian Gac, Winston-Salem Dash	96
SB	Jeff Kobernus, Potomac Nationals	53

=== Pitching leaders ===
Stat	Player	Total
W	Cameron Bayne, Winston-Salem Dash	12
ERA	Drew Pomeranz, Kinston Indians	1.87
SV	Ryan Buchter, Lynchburg Hillcats; Taylor Thompson, Winston-Salem Dash	15
SO	Justin Marks, Wilmington Blue Rocks	140
IP	Chris Masters, Lynchburg Hillcats	148.1

== Playoffs ==
- The Frederick Keys won their fourth Carolina League championship, defeating the Kinston Indians in four games.

=== Playoff bracket ===
Semi-finals
N1	Frederick	3
N2	Potomac	2
S1	Kinston	3
S2	Myrtle Beach	1

Finals
N1	Frederick	3
S1	Kinston	1

== Awards ==
Carolina League awards
Award name	Recipient
Most Valuable Player	Ian Gac, Winston-Salem Dash
Pitcher of the Year	Robbie Ross Jr., Myrtle Beach Pelicans
Manager of the Year	Aaron Holbert, Kinston Indians

== See also ==
- 2011 Major League Baseball season
