= 2010 Carolina League season =

- League: Carolina League
- Sport: Baseball
- Duration: April 8 – September 6
- Games: 140
- Teams: 8

Regular season
- Season MVP: Tyler Moore, Potomac Nationals

Playoffs
- League champions: Potomac Nationals
- Runners-up: Winston-Salem Dash

CL seasons
- ← 2009 2011 →

The 2010 Carolina League was a Class A-Advanced baseball season played between April 8 and September 6. Eight teams played a 140-game schedule, with two teams from each division competing in the playoffs.

The Potomac Nationals won the Carolina League championship, defeating the Winston-Salem Dash in the final round of the playoffs.

== Team changes ==
- The Lynchburg Hillcats ended their affiliation with the Pittsburgh Pirates and began a new affiliation with the Cincinnati Reds.

== Teams ==
2010 Carolina League
Division	Team	City	MLB Affiliate	Stadium
North	Frederick Keys	Frederick, Maryland	Baltimore Orioles	Harry Grove Stadium
North	Lynchburg Hillcats	Lynchburg, Virginia	Cincinnati Reds	Calvin Falwell Field
North	Potomac Nationals	Woodbridge, Virginia	Washington Nationals	G. Richard Pfitzner Stadium
North	Wilmington Blue Rocks	Wilmington, Delaware	Kansas City Royals	Daniel S. Frawley Stadium
South	Kinston Indians	Kinston, North Carolina	Cleveland Indians	Grainger Stadium
South	Myrtle Beach Pelicans	Myrtle Beach, South Carolina	Atlanta Braves	BB&T Coastal Field
South	Salem Red Sox	Salem, Virginia	Boston Red Sox	Lewis Gale Field
South	Winston-Salem Dash	Winston-Salem, North Carolina	Chicago White Sox	BB&T Ballpark

== Map of teams ==
North division South division

== Regular season ==
=== Summary ===
- The Winston-Salem Dash finished with the best record in the league for the first time since 1979.

=== Standings ===
North division
Team	Win	Loss	%	GB
Frederick Keys	72	68	.514	–
Potomac Nationals	70	69	.504	1.5
Wilmington Blue Rocks	68	70	.493	3
Lynchburg Hillcats	61	77	.442	10
South division
Winston-Salem Dash	81	58	.583	–
Salem Red Sox	73	65	.529	7.5
Kinston Indians	73	67	.521	8.5
Myrtle Beach Pelicans	58	82	.414	23.5

==== First half standings ====
North division
Team	Win	Loss	%	GB
Frederick Keys	41	29	.586	–
Wilmington Blue Rocks	32	38	.457	9
Potomac Nationals	31	39	.443	10
Lynchburg Hillcats	29	41	.414	12
South division
Winston-Salem Dash	43	27	.614	–
Salem Red Sox	42	28	.600	1
Kinston Indians	36	34	.514	7
Myrtle Beach Pelicans	26	44	.371	17

==== Second half standings ====
North division
Team	Win	Loss	%	GB
Potomac Nationals	39	30	.565	–
Wilmington Blue Rocks	36	32	.529	2.5
Lynchburg Hillcats	32	36	.471	6.5
Frederick Keys	31	39	.443	8.5
South division
Winston-Salem Dash	38	31	.551	–
Kinston Indians	37	33	.529	1.5
Myrtle Beach Pelicans	32	38	.457	6.5
Salem Red Sox	31	37	.456	6.5

== League Leaders ==
=== Batting leaders ===
Stat	Player	Total
AVG	Eric Hosmer, Wilmington Blue Rocks	.354
H	Jon Gilmore, Winston-Salem Dash	177
R	Seth Loman, Winston-Salem Dash	88
2B	Tyler Moore, Potomac Nationals	43
3B	Justin Greene, Winston-Salem Dash; Steve Lombardozzi, Potomac Nationals; Cole Miles, Myrtle Beach Pelicans	9
HR	Tyler Moore, Potomac Nationals	31
RBI	Tyler Moore, Potomac Nationals	111
SB	Kyle Hudson, Frederick Keys	40

=== Pitching leaders ===
Stat	Player	Total
W	Joe Gardner, Kinston Indians	12
ERA	Dylan Axelrod, Winston-Salem Dash	1.99
SV	Jumbo Díaz, Frederick Keys	12
SO	Randall Delgado, Myrtle Beach Pelicans	120
IP	Nate Jones, Winston-Salem Dash	152.1

== Playoffs ==
- The Potomac Nationals won their third Carolina League championship, defeating the Winston-Salem Dash in four games.

=== Playoff bracket ===
Semi-finals
N1	Frederick	1
N2	Potomac	3
S1	Winston-Salem	3
S2	Kinston	0

Finals
N2	Potomac	3
S1	Winston-Salem	1

== Awards ==
Carolina League awards
Award name	Recipient
Most Valuable Player	Tyler Moore, Potomac Nationals
Pitcher of the Year	Jordan Hotchkiss, Lynchburg Hillcats
Manager of the Year	Joe McEwing, Winston-Salem Dash

== See also ==
- 2010 Major League Baseball season
