= BB&T Ballpark =

BB&T Ballpark may refer to:

- Muncy Bank Ballpark at Historic Bowman Field, a baseball park in Williamsport, Pennsylvania formerly named BB&T Ballpark at Historic Bowman Field
- Truist Field, a baseball park in Charlotte, North Carolina formerly named BB&T Ballpark
- Truist Stadium, a baseball park in Winston-Salem, North Carolina formerly named BB&T Ballpark

== See also ==
- BB&T Center (Sunrise, Florida)
- TicketReturn.com Field (formerly BB&T Coastal Field)
- Truist Field at Wake Forest (formerly BB&T Field)
- Truist Point (formerly BB&T Point)
