= Zebulon Devil Dogz =

Minor league baseball team in Zebulon, NC

- Logo

Information
- League: Coastal Plain League (East)
- Location: Zebulon, North Carolina, US
- Ballpark: Nomaco Park
- Founded: 2026
- Colors: Red, white, black, and blue
- Mascot: Tasmanian Devil
- Ownership: Capitol Broadcasting Company
- Manager: Caleb Whittemore
- Website: zebulondevildogz.com

The Zebulon Devil Dogz are a collegiate summer baseball team that plays at Nomaco Park in Zebulon, North Carolina, United States. Part of the Coastal Plain League; the team was organized by OzBall, an organization which aids Australian athletes in finding employment abroad.

The team was announced in late 2025 as the replacement tenants for Five County Stadium, the previous name of Nomaco Park, after the departure and rebranding of the Carolina Mudcats. The team's first game was on May 22, 2026. Their mascot is an anthropomorphic, red Tasmanian devil. The team is owned by the Coastal Plain League, which itself is owned by the Capitol Broadcasting Company.

== History ==
The Carolina Mudcats were a Minor League Baseball (MiLB) team located at Five County Stadium in Zebulon, North Carolina, since 1991. After an agreement was made for the team to move towns and rebrand, the Mudcats held their final season in 2025, leaving Five County Stadium without a tenant for the next year. It was first announced no later than November 2025 that a new collegiate summer baseball team under the Coastal Plain League would next occupy the stadium that was initially advertised to consist entirely of players born in Australia. This arrangement was organized by OzBall, an organization which aids Australian athletes in finding employment abroad. A contest to choose the team's name was launched soon after, which ultimately received more than 900 name suggestions before a final five were chosen and voted on before December 1, the end of the voting period. Privately, a trademark was filed by the Carolina Plain League for the name "Zebulon Devil Dogz" on February 4, 2026, and on February 24, the name was officially announced at a Zebulon Town Hall meeting after receiving around 90% of the public votes between the final five. The name "Devil Dogz" has dual meaning in referencing the Tasmanian devil, a mammal found only in Australia and the team's mascot, and DEVIL-DOG Dungarees, a formerly-major employer in Zebulon which produced jeans. The "z" at the end of "dogs" reportedly is a reference to OzBall. The announcement of the team was met with relatively positive comments from officials of the Wake County Board of Commissioners and the town of Zebulon, in contrast to the mixed-to-negative reception given at the announcement of the Wilson Warbirds.

It's going to be a little bit shorter [than a minor league season], and it's going to talk a little bit funnier. You can have a high level of baseball, and you can be wildly entertaining. That's what we're doing here.

— Chip Allen, the Coastal Plain League Commissioner, in a statement made the day the team's name was officially announced

The team's first game was on May 22, 2026, and featured all-you-can-eat food including hot dogs, hamburgers, chicken sandwiches, and a "mystery" Australian cuisine as a promotion. The day before on May 21, a ribbon-cutting ceremony was officiated by the Mayor of Zebulon, Jessica Daniels Harrison, and Chair of the Wake County Board of Commissioners, Don Mial. The final team roster for opening night included players from New Zealand and the US in addition to Australia, differing from the originally advertised all-Australian team.

Nomaco Park, the ballpark the team plays at, was assessed as needing renovations costing up to $1 million to complete. In March 2026, the team reportedly stated that it would begin by renovating the bathrooms, concession stands, and turf before the start of the season. By April, all Mudcat-themed branding had been removed from the stadium and adjacent water tower.

== Branding ==
The team's mascot is an anthropomorphic, red Tasmanian devil, with horns piecing a Navy blue baseball cap, throwing a baseball. The mascot, along with the teams other logos, were designed by Brian Begley. The pinstripes on players jerseys are designed to look like small zippers, in reference to the product produced by DEVIL-DOG Dungarees.

== Ownership and leadership ==
The team is entirely owned by the Coastal Plain League, which itself is owned by the Capitol Broadcasting Company (CBC). While the CBC has ownership; agreeing to pay US$710,000 in lease payments over ten years, Wake County and Zebulon were named as stakeholders, and agreed to pay up to $10 million in the stadium's repairs through 2027.

In November 2025, the general manager for the team's first season was announced as Caleb Whittemore. Additionally, Nick Swim serves as the manager, Luke Livian as pitching coach, and Mikey Anerton and Joe Webber as assistant coaches.
