= Mario Feliciano =

Puerto Rican baseball player (born 1998)

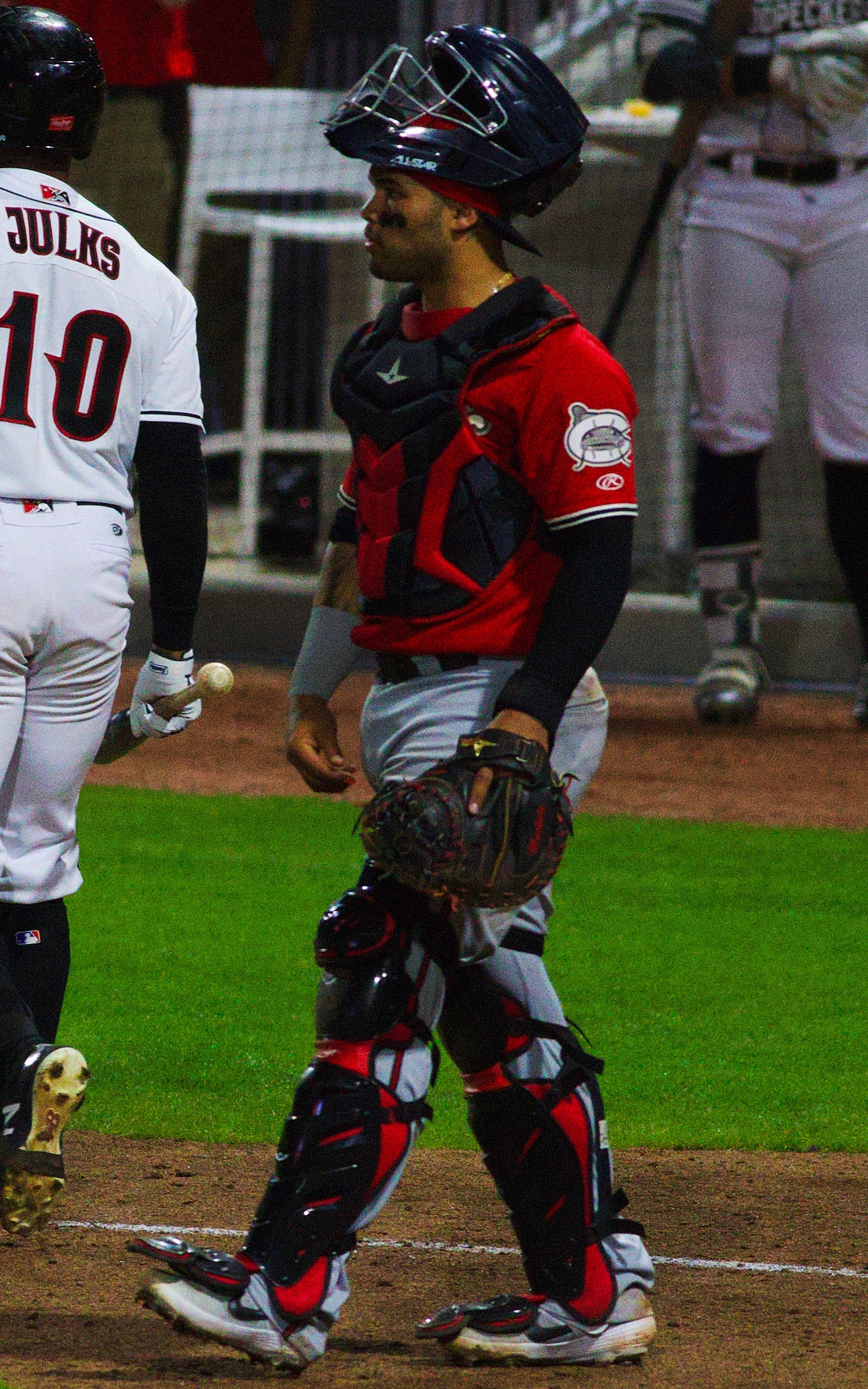
- Feliciano with the Carolina Mudcats in 2019

Lake Country DockHounds – No. 0
- Catcher
- Born: November 20, 1998 (age 27); Bayamón, Puerto Rico
- Bats: Right Throws: Right

MLB debut
- May 1, 2021, for the Milwaukee Brewers

MLB statistics (through 2022 season)
- Batting average: .250
- Home runs: 0
- Runs batted in: 0
- Stats at Baseball Reference

Teams
- Milwaukee Brewers (2021–2022)

Mario Javier Feliciano (born November 20, 1998) is a Puerto Rican professional baseball catcher for the Lake Country DockHounds of the American Association of Professional Baseball. He has previously played in Major League Baseball (MLB) for the Milwaukee Brewers.

== Career ==
=== Milwaukee Brewers ===
The Milwaukee Brewers selected Feliciano in the second round of the 2016 Major League Baseball draft out of the Carlos Beltran Academy in Florida, Puerto Rico. He made his professional debut with the Arizona League Brewers.

Feliciano spent the 2017 season with the Wisconsin Timber Rattlers, batting .265 with 16 RBIs over 29 games, and 2018 with the Arizona League Brewers and Carolina Mudcats, slashing .251/.320/.331 with four home runs and 36 RBIs in 104 games. He played in only 46 games during the 2018 season, hitting .213 with three home runs, and only two games in the Arizona Fall League due to a shoulder injury. He started the 2019 campaign with Carolina.

Feliciano did not play in a game in 2020 due to the cancellation of the minor league season because of the COVID-19 pandemic. On November 20, 2020, the Brewers added Feliciano to their 40-man roster to protect him from the Rule 5 draft.

On May 1, 2021, Feliciano was promoted to the major leagues for the first time. He made his MLB debut that night as a pinch hitter, drawing a walk against Los Angeles Dodgers pitcher Alex Vesia in the bottom of the 11th inning. Feliciano scored the game-winning run later that inning, his first MLB run scored.

On August 17, 2022, Feliciano collected his first career hit, lacing a single off of Los Angeles Dodgers starter Tony Gonsolin. In two appearances for Milwaukee, he went 1-for-4 (.250) with one walk. On December 14, Feliciano was designated for assignment following the acquisition of Owen Miller.

=== Detroit Tigers ===
On December 21, 2022, Feliciano was claimed off waivers by the Detroit Tigers. On January 6, 2023, Feliciano was removed from the 40-man roster and sent outright to the Triple-A Toledo Mud Hens. He spent the 2023 season with the rookie–level Florida Complex League Tigers, Single–A Lakeland Flying Tigers, and Double–A Erie SeaWolves. In 52 games between the three affiliates, Feliciano hit .233/.286/.296 with no home runs and 20 RBI. He elected free agency following the season on November 6.

=== Trois-Rivières Aigles ===
On February 23, 2024, Feliciano signed with the Sultanes de Monterrey of the Mexican League. However, on April 18, he signed with the Trois-Rivières Aigles of the Frontier League. In 22 games, he batted .241/.319/.329 with no home runs and seven RBI.

=== Pericos de Puebla ===
On June 13, 2024, Feliciano‘s contract was purchased by the Pericos de Puebla of the Mexican League. In 30 games for Puebla, he slashed .159/.243/.238 with one home run and five RBI. Feliciano was released by the Pericos on October 14.

=== Tigres de Quintana Roo ===
On February 25, 2025, Feliciano signed with the Milwaukee Milkmen of the American Association of Professional Baseball. However, he did not appear in a game for Milwaukee. On June 6, Feliciano signed with the Tigres de Quintana Roo of the Mexican League. In seven appearances for Quintana Roo, he went 5-for-14 (.357) with one home run and three RBI.

=== Rieleros de Aguascalientes ===
On June 18, 2025, Feliciano was traded to the Rieleros de Aguascalientes of the Mexican League. Feliciano made 12 appearances for Aguascalientes, batting .458/.517/.542 with five RBI.

=== Lake Country DockHounds ===
On May 19, 2026, Feliciano signed with the Lake Country DockHounds of the American Association of Professional Baseball.
