= Nellie Rodríguez =

American baseball player (born 1994)

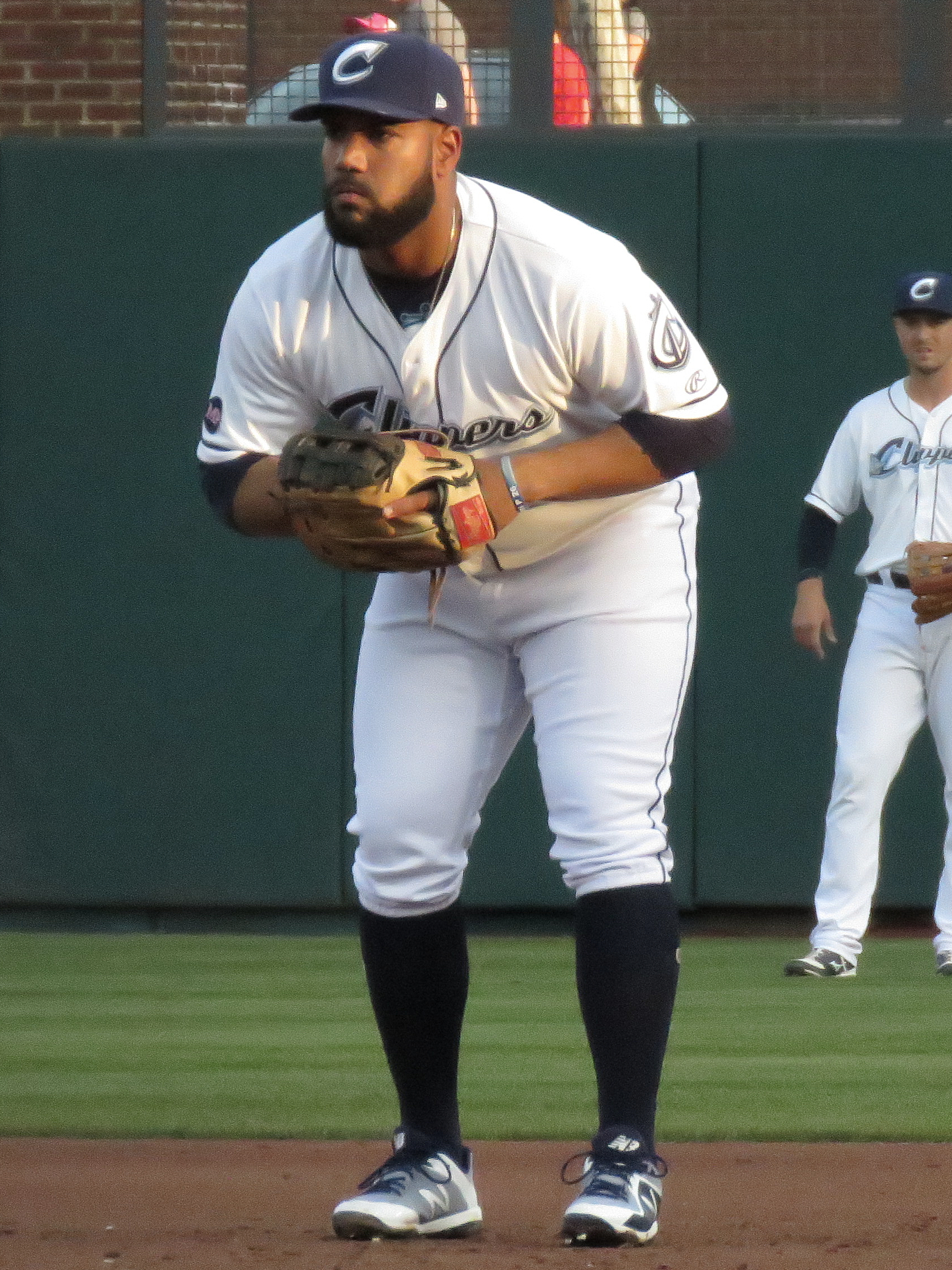
- Rodríguez with the Columbus Clippers in 2018

Free agent
- First baseman
- Born: June 12, 1994 (age 32); New York, New York, U.S.
- Bats: Right Throws: Right
- Stats at Baseball Reference

Nelson Rodríguez (born June 12, 1994) is an American professional baseball first baseman who is a free agent. He was drafted in the 15th round of the 2012 MLB draft by the Cleveland Indians.

== Career ==
=== Cleveland Indians ===
Rodríguez attended George Washington High School in Washington Heights, Manhattan. The Cleveland Indians selected Rodríguez in the 15th round of the 2012 MLB draft. He started the 2013 season with the Lake County Captains of the Single–A Midwest League, but struggled, and was demoted to the Mahoning Valley Scrappers of the Low–A New York-Penn League. He returned to Lake County in 2014. He began the 2015 season with the Lynchburg Hillcats of the High–A Carolina League, and was promoted to the Akron RubberDucks of the Double–A Eastern League during the season. He played for Akron in 2016, earning a non-roster invitation to the Indians' 2017 spring training camp.

Rodríguez was rated as the Indians #3 first base prospect entering the 2018 season. He played in 107 games split between Akron and the Triple–A Columbus Clippers, hitting .228/.308/.416 with 15 home runs and 62 RBI. Rodríguez elected free agency following the season on November 2, 2018.

Rodríguez re-signed with the Indians on a minor league contract on February 27, 2019. In 78 games for Double–A Akron, he batted .199/.281/.376 with 12 home runs and 42 RBI. Rodríguez elected free agency following the season on November 4.

=== York Revolution ===
On March 17, 2020, Rodríguez signed with the York Revolution of the Atlantic League of Professional Baseball. He did not play a game for the team because of the cancellation of the ALPB season due to the COVID-19 pandemic and became a free agent after the year. On February 22, 2021, Rodríguez re-signed with the Revolution for the 2021 season. In 16 games with York, Rodríguez slashed .371/.467/.597 with 3 home runs and 18 RBI.

=== Toros de Tijuana ===
On July 4, 2021, Rodríguez signed with the Toros de Tijuana of the Mexican League. On July 11, Rodríguez was granted his release by Tijuana after going 4-for-20 in 6 games with the team.

=== York Revolution (second stint) ===
On July 16, 2021, Rodríguez re-signed with the York Revolution of the Atlantic League of Professional Baseball. Rodríguez was named the Revolution player of the year after batting .316 with 25 home runs and 81 RBI in 91 games with the team. He became a free agent following the season.

On February 7, 2022, Rodríguez signed with the Revolution for the 2022 season. He played in 124 games for York, slashing .249/.414/.477 with 26 home runs and 82 RBI.

On February 7, 2023, Rodríguez re-signed with York for the 2023 season. His 2023 numbers were very similar to those from the previous season: he hit .253/.367/.496 with 24 home runs and 82 RBI in 124 games.

=== Pericos de Puebla ===
On October 1, 2023, Rodríguez signed with the Pericos de Puebla of the Mexican League. In 51 games for Puebla, he batted .262/.357/.429 with four home runs and 16 RBI. Rodríguez was released by the Pericos on July 17, 2024.

=== Hagerstown Flying Boxcars ===
On July 26, 2024, Rodríguez signed with the Hagerstown Flying Boxcars of the Atlantic League of Professional Baseball. In 44 games for the team, he batted .205/.322/.371 with six home runs and 21 RBI. Rodríguez became a free agent following the season.

=== Columbus Pirates ===
On August 3, 2025, following the Westerville Expos-Columbus Pirates MSBL game, Rodríguez agreed to terms with the Pirates to participate in the 2025 MSBL Fall Classic in West Palm Beach, FL. Rodriguez will wear #21 for the Pirates, saying "21 on Pirates jersey will always be special!"

== Personal life ==
Rodríguez's father, Nelson, was born in the Dominican Republic and played professional baseball, reaching Double-A with the Pittsburgh Pirates' organization.
