= Tyler Moore (baseball) =

American baseball player (born 1987)

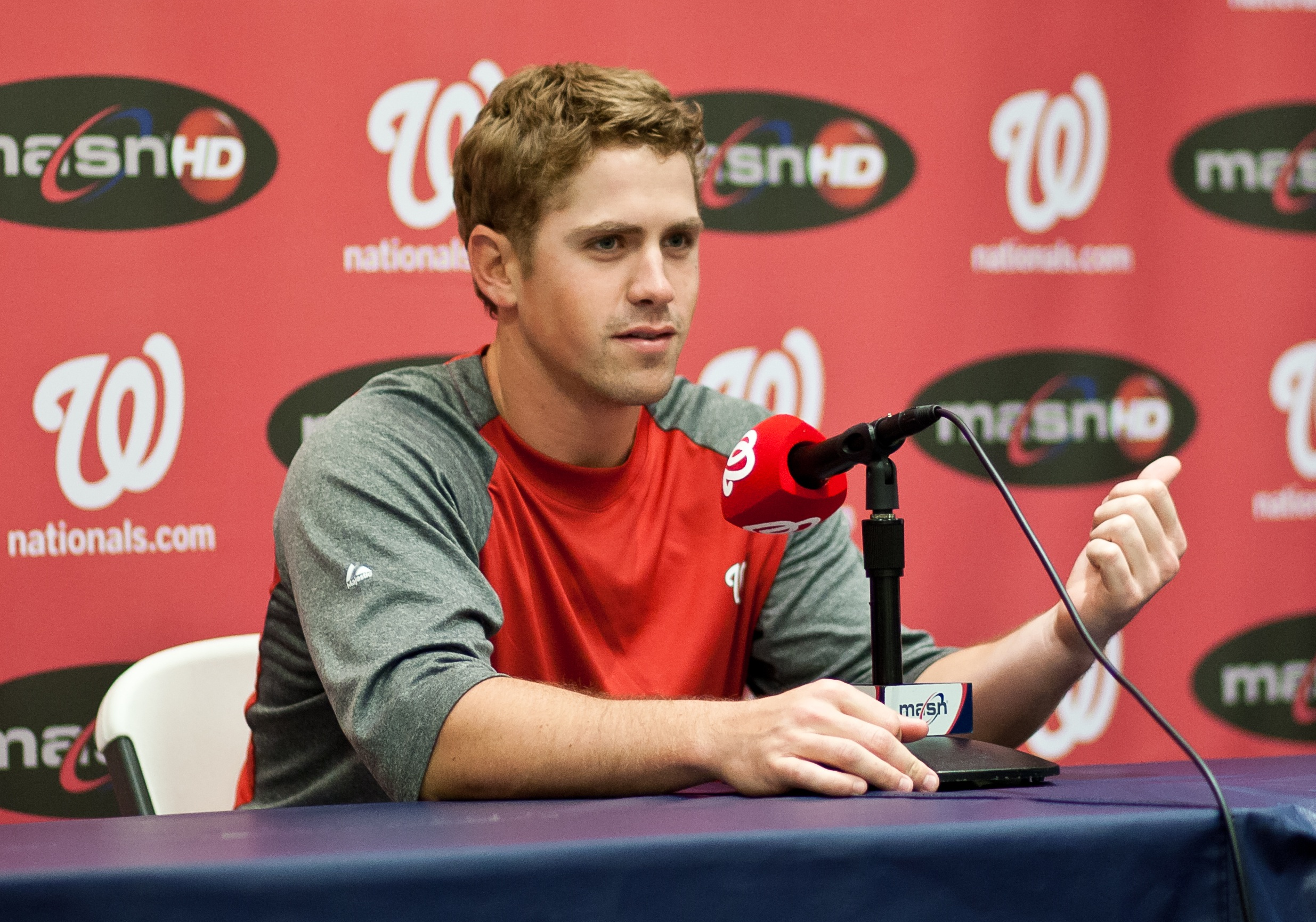
- Moore with the Washington Nationals
- Left fielder / First baseman
- Born: January 30, 1987 (age 38); Brandon, Mississippi, U.S.
- Batted: Right Threw: Right

MLB debut
- April 29, 2012, for the Washington Nationals

Last MLB appearance
- October 1, 2017, for the Miami Marlins

MLB statistics
- Batting average: .227
- Home runs: 30
- Runs batted in: 121
- Stats at Baseball Reference

Teams
- Washington Nationals (2012–2015); Miami Marlins (2017)

Tyler Michael Moore (born January 30, 1987) is an American former professional baseball left fielder and first baseman. He played in Major League Baseball (MLB) for the Washington Nationals and Miami Marlins.

== Professional career ==
=== Washington Nationals ===
Moore was drafted by the Washington Nationals in the 16th round of the 2008 Major League Baseball draft out of the Mississippi State University. Moore was drafted two times previously, both by the Nationals.

He was assigned to Low-A Vermont that season, where he had a .200 batting average in 71 games with the club. He struck out 66 times, compared to only 13 walks. He hit only 6 home runs, despite the high K/BB ratio. He still earned a promotion for the next season, 2009, playing with Single-A Hagerstown. He played in 111 games with a .297 batting average, his highest to date. He struck out an average of once a game, and had 87 RBI. His improved K/BB ratio earned him a promotion, this time to Double-A Harrisburg. 2010 was his breakout season, playing in 129 games with a .269 average. He didn't decrease his K/BB ratio, but he did hit 31 home runs as a response. He also had 111 RBI and an .873 OPS. This earned him the Nationals' 2010 Minor League Player of the Year. He played 2011 with Triple-A Syracuse, where he hit .270 in 137 games. He had 31 home runs again, but his RBI total decreased, and his K/BB ratio increased.

Moore was added to the Nationals' 40 man roster on November 18, 2011. On April 29, 2012, Moore was recalled to Washington when Mark DeRosa was placed on the 15-day DL. Moore was hitting .286 with 7 HR and 20 RBI in 22 games with Triple-A Syracuse. On June 13, 2012, during a game against the Toronto Blue Jays, Tyler Moore hit his first 2 home runs of his Major League career and 5 RBI. He finished his rookie campaign batting .263/.327/.513 with 10 home runs and 29 RBI in 75 appearances.

In 2013, Moore played in 63 games for the big league club, posting a slash of .222/.260/.347 with 4 home runs and 21 RBI. The following year, he played in 42 games for Washington, and matched his previous year's home run total while batting .231/.300/.385. He collected his most playing time for the Nationals in 2015, receiving 200 plate appearances in 97 games and batted .203/.250/.364 with 6 home runs and 27 RBI. Moore was outrighted from the Nationals' 40-man roster on March 25, 2016.

=== Atlanta Braves ===
On March 27, 2016, Moore was traded to the Atlanta Braves for Nate Freiman. He was assigned to the Triple-A Gwinnett Braves, where he hit .229/.276/.375 across 25 games. He elected free agency on October 11, 2016.

=== Miami Marlins ===
On December 13, 2016, Moore signed a minor league contract with the Miami Marlins. Moore was selected to Miami's 40-man roster on April 2, 2017, but was designated for assignment on April 17 after collecting four hits in 11 plate appearances. He was re-selected to the Marlins' roster on May 9 and finished the year with a .230 average with six home runs and 30 RBI in 97 appearances for the club. Moore was removed from the 40-man roster and sent outright to the Triple-A New Orleans Baby Cakes on October 7, and elected free agency on October 9.

== Personal life ==
His half-brother, Reid Humphreys, played in the Colorado Rockies organization.
