= Billy Burns (baseball) =

American baseball player (born 1989)

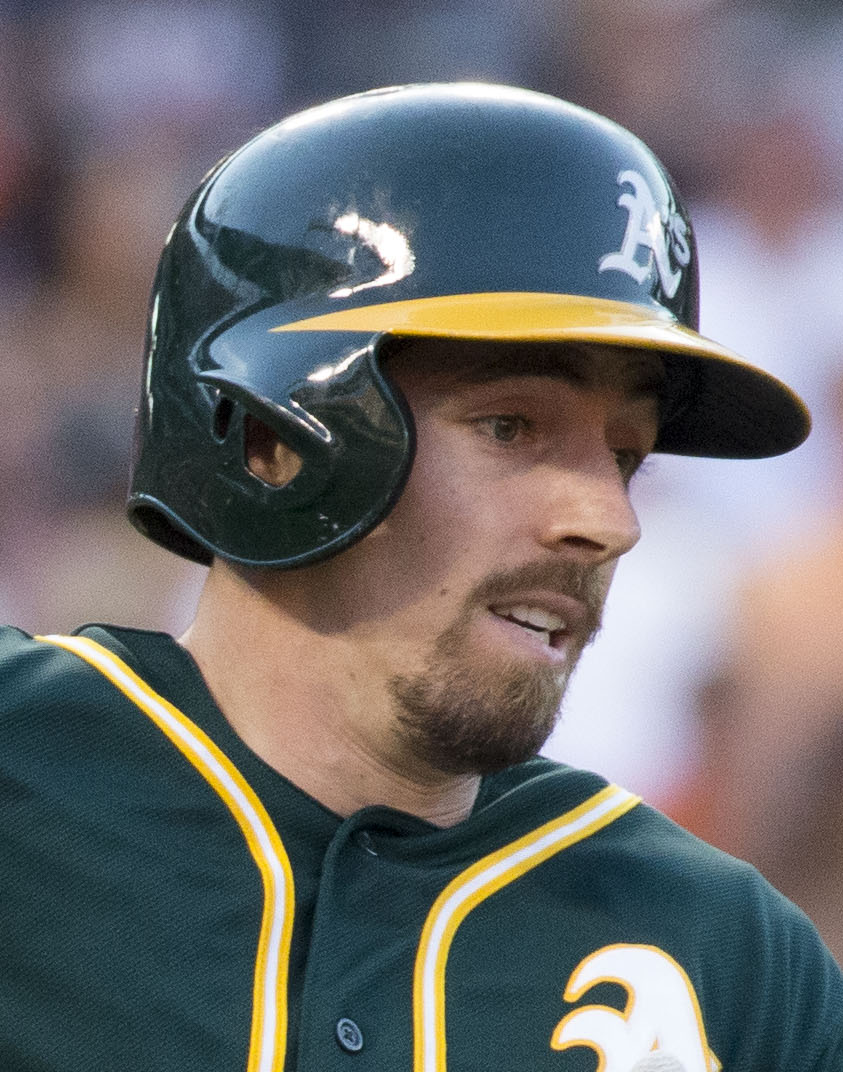
- Burns with the Oakland Athletics
- Center fielder
- Born: August 30, 1989 (age 36); Atlanta, Georgia, U.S.
- Batted: Switch Threw: Right

MLB debut
- July 28, 2014, for the Oakland Athletics

Last MLB appearance
- July 21, 2017, for the Kansas City Royals

MLB statistics
- Batting average: .270
- Home runs: 5
- Runs batted in: 55
- Stolen bases: 46
- Stats at Baseball Reference

Teams
- Oakland Athletics (2014–2016); Kansas City Royals (2016–2017)

William John Burns (born August 30, 1989) is an American former professional baseball center fielder. He played in Major League Baseball (MLB) for the Oakland Athletics and Kansas City Royals.

== Career ==
=== Amateur ===
Burns attended George Walton Comprehensive High School in Marietta, Georgia, and Mercer University. In 2011, he played collegiate summer baseball with the Harwich Mariners of the Cape Cod Baseball League.

=== Washington Nationals ===
He was drafted by the Washington Nationals in the 32nd round of the 2011 Major League Baseball draft, and started the 2013 season with the Potomac Nationals but was promoted to the Double-A Harrisburg Senators during the season. Burns hit .315/.425/.383 and stole 74 bases between the two levels. After the season, he was named the Nationals Minor League Player of the Year.

=== Oakland Athletics ===
On December 11, 2013, the Nationals traded Burns to the Oakland Athletics for Jerry Blevins. Burns hit .250/.333/.330, with 51 stolen bases, before being called up to the majors from the Double-A Midland RockHounds on July 28, 2014.

On May 24, 2015 he hit his first MLB home run against Tampa Bay Rays, when he swung on the first pitch of the game. In 2015 he batted 294/.334/.392 with 26 stolen bases, and led the majors in percentage of soft-hit batted balls (31.0%).

=== Kansas City Royals ===
On July 30, 2016, the Athletics traded Burns to the Kansas City Royals for Brett Eibner.

The Royals designated Burns for assignment on February 28, 2018. He cleared waivers and was outrighted to the Triple-A Omaha Storm Chasers on March 4. In 102 games for Omaha, Burns batted .255/.314/.317 with four home runs, 36 RBI, and 10 stolen bases. He elected free agency following the season on November 2.

=== New York Yankees ===
On January 4, 2019, the New York Yankees signed Burns to a minor league contract. He received a non-roster invitation to spring training in 2019. In 93 games for the Triple–A Scranton/Wilkes-Barre RailRiders, he hit .258/.330/.360 with two home runs, 25 RBI, and 14 stolen bases. Burns elected free agency following the season on November 4.

As of July 15, 2020, Burns had retired from professional baseball and become a real estate agent.

== Personal life ==
His sister, Abbey, is a member of the U.S. Paralympic Swim Team.
