= Bobby Bradley (first baseman) =

American baseball player (born 1996)

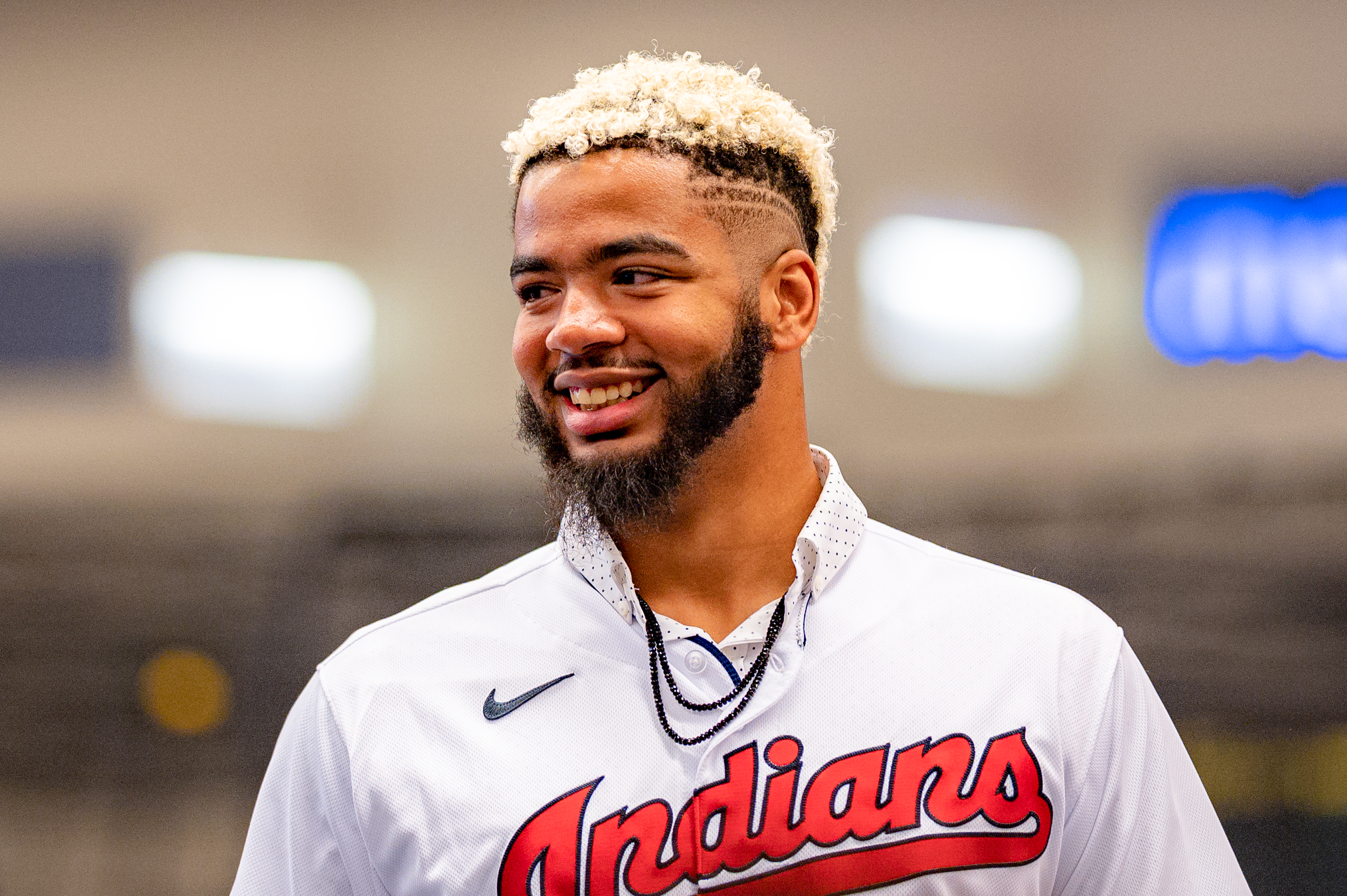
- Bradley with the Cleveland Indians in 2020

Free agent
- First baseman
- Born: May 29, 1996 (age 30); Gulfport, Mississippi, U.S.
- Bats: Left Throws: Right

MLB debut
- June 23, 2019, for the Cleveland Indians

MLB statistics (through 2022 season)
- Batting average: .199
- Home runs: 17
- Runs batted in: 45
- Stats at Baseball Reference

Teams
- Cleveland Indians / Guardians (2019, 2021–2022)

Bobby Bradley (born May 29, 1996) is an American professional baseball first baseman who is a free agent. He has previously played in Major League Baseball (MLB) for the Cleveland Indians / Guardians.

== Early life ==
Bradley was born May 29, 1996, in Gulfport, Mississippi. He attended Harrison Central High School in Gulfport.

== Career ==
=== Cleveland Indians / Guardians ===
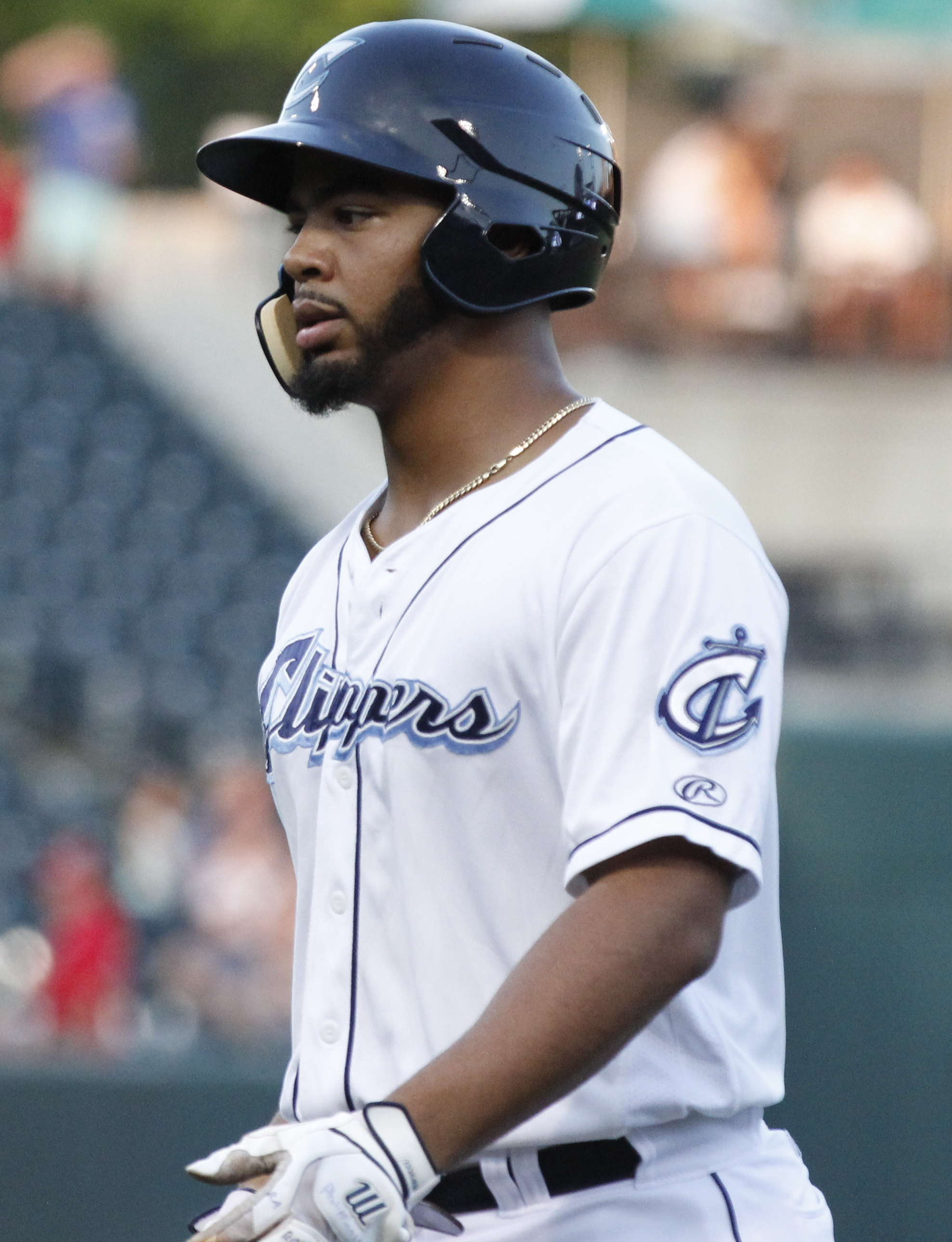
Bradley with the Columbus Clippers in 2018

Bradley was drafted by the Cleveland Indians in the third round of the 2014 Major League Baseball draft. He signed with the Indians rather than play college baseball at Louisiana State University. Bradley made his professional debut that season with the Arizona League Indians. He won the Arizona League Triple Crown after leading the league in batting average (.361), home runs (eight) and runs batted in (50) in 39 games. After the season, he was named the league's MVP. Following his breakout 2014 season, Bradley spent 2015 with the Lake County Captains where he posted a .269 batting average with 27 home runs and 92 RBIs in 108 games. Bradley spent 2016 with the Lynchburg Hillcats where he batted .235 with 29 home runs and 102 RBIs in 131 games, and in 2017, Bradley played for the Akron RubberDucks where he hit .251 with 23 home runs and 89 RBIs, along with posting a .796 OPS in 131 games.

MLB.com ranked Bradley as Cleveland's third ranked prospect going into the 2018 season. He spent the year with both Akron and the Columbus Clippers, slashing a combined .224/.308/.466 with 27 home runs and 83 RBIs in 129 games.

The Indians added Bradley to their 40-man roster after the 2018 season. He returned to Columbus to begin 2019. On May 13, 2019, he was named to MLB Pipeline's Prospect Team of the Week.

On June 23, 2019, Bradley was called up to the major leagues for the first time. Later that day he made his MLB debut, batting 1 for 3 with a RBI double in his first MLB at-bat. Bradley hit his first Major League home run on July 13, 2019, against the Minnesota Twins. He finished his rookie campaign hitting .178/.245/.356 in 15 games. Bradley did not make an appearance for the Indians in 2020.

Bradley began the 2021 season with the Columbus Clippers of the newly-formed Triple-A East. On June 5, 2021, Bradley was recalled by the Indians to their active roster. On the year, Bradley played in 74 games for Cleveland, batting .208/.294/.445 with 16 home runs and 41 RBI.

In 2022, he appeared in 8 games for the newly named Guardians, collecting 2 hits in 17 at-bats while striking out 9 times. Bradley was designated for assignment by the Guardians on May 1, 2022. After clearing waivers, Bradley was sent outright to the Triple-A Columbus on May 5. In 47 games for Columbus, he limped to a .174/.268/.359 slash line with 7 home runs and 30 RBI. He was released by Cleveland on August 6.

=== Charleston Dirty Birds ===
On April 13, 2023, Bradley signed with the Charleston Dirty Birds of the Atlantic League of Professional Baseball. In 120 games for Charleston, Bradley batted .270/.370/.545 with 30 home runs and 81 RBI.

=== Toros de Tijuana ===
On January 24, 2024, Bradley signed with the Toros de Tijuana of the Mexican League. In 81 appearances for Tijuana, he batted .271/.412/.462 with 13 home runs, 53 RBI, and three stolen bases. Bradley was released by the Toros on March 24, 2025.

=== Charleston Dirty Birds (second stint) ===
On April 24, 2025, Bradley signed with the Charleston Dirty Birds of the Atlantic League of Professional Baseball. In 20 appearances for Charleston, Bradley batted .219/.369/.328 with two home runs and eight RBI.

=== Saraperos de Saltillo ===
On May 20, 2025, Bradley signed with the Saraperos de Saltillo of the Mexican League. In 63 games for the Saraperos, he hit .305/.434/.502 with 12 home runs, 56 RBI, and three stolen bases. On February 4, 2026, Bradley was released by Saltillo.
