= Nomaco Park =

Baseball stadium in Zebulon, North Carolina

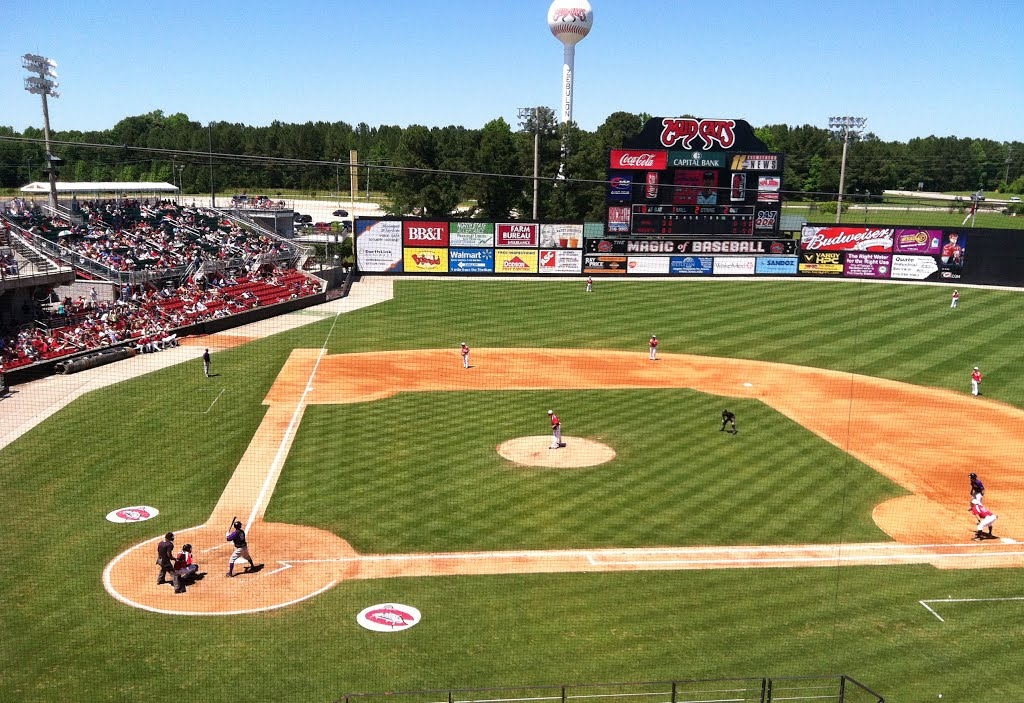
- Interactive map of Nomaco Park
- Former names: Five County Stadium (1991–2026)
- Location: 1501 NC Highway 39; Zebulon, North Carolina; United States
- Coordinates: 35°49′2″N 78°16′12″W
- Owner: Wake County 85%, Town of Zebulon 15%
- Operator: Capitol Broadcasting Company
- Capacity: 6,500
- Surface: Grass
- Field size: Left field: 330 ft (100 m); Left-center field: 365 ft (111 m); Center field: 400 ft (120 m); Right-center field: 365 ft (111 m); Right field: 309 ft (94 m)

Construction
- Groundbreaking: January 19, 1991
- Built: 1991
- Opened: July 3, 1991
- Renovated: 1999
- Expanded: 1999
- Cost: $2.5 million ($5.91 million in 2025 dollars)
- Architect: Odell Associates
- Structural engineer: Excel Engineering
- General contractor: Richard Beach Builders

Tenants
- Carolina Mudcats (SL/CL) 1991–2025; Zebulon Devil Dogz (CPL) 2026–present

Nomaco Park (known as Five County Stadium until 2026) is a baseball stadium located in Zebulon, North Carolina, a suburb of Raleigh, that was opened in 1991 and extensively renovated in 1999. It has a seating capacity of 6,500 people. The ballpark currently serves as the home of the Zebulon Devil Dogz of the Coastal Plain League. It was formerly the home of the Carolina Mudcats of the Carolina League from 1991 to 2025.

The stadium's original name came from its location in Wake County, which is within 5 miles (8.0 km) of Franklin, Nash, Johnston, and Wilson counties.

US 264 passes by the stadium at a generally northwest-to-southeast angle (behind left and center fields), while NC 39 skirts the east side of the property (right field). Parking lots surround the field on the other sides, and a large grass field, often used as a campground, lies behind home plate.

== History ==
=== Carolina Mudcats (1991–2025) ===
When Columbus Mudcats owner Steve Bryant moved the club to North Carolina in 1991 as the Carolina Mudcats, he wanted a new facility that was deemed to be outside the territories of other minor league clubs in the state (including the South Atlantic League's Greensboro Hornets, which he also owned) while also being easily accessible by the public. A site was chosen in Zebulon, which was as close to Raleigh as the Mudcats could get without infringing on the territorial rights of the Durham Bulls. To construct the ballpark quickly, the builders opted for metal seating rather than the traditional concrete. The 1999 renovation replaced most of the metal with concrete.

The Double-A Mudcats moved to Pensacola in 2011, and the Carolina League's Kinston Indians moved to Zebulon and continued as the Mudcats at Class A-Advanced. They remained at that level until being reclassified to Low-A for the 2021 season.

The 2025 season was the Mudcats' 35th and final season of play at Nomaco Park. The team relocated to Wilson, North Carolina, as the Wilson Warbirds in 2026. Carolina's final home game was a 1–0 loss to the Delmarva Shorebirds played on August 31, 2025, with 5,877 people in attendance.

=== Post-Mudcats ===
In September 2025, the Wake County Board of Commissioners and the Town of Zebulon Board of Commissioners voted unanimously to approve a new stadium operator, Capitol Broadcasting Company, effective January 1, 2026.

Beginning in 2026, the stadium's primary tenants are the Zebulon Devil Dogz of the Coastal Plain League and Wake Technical Community College athletics (baseball, softball, and men's and women's soccer).

On May 21, 2026, Capitol Broadcasting Co. announced a naming rights deal with Nomaco, Inc.

== Images ==
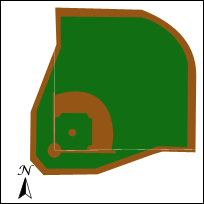
A diagram of the field

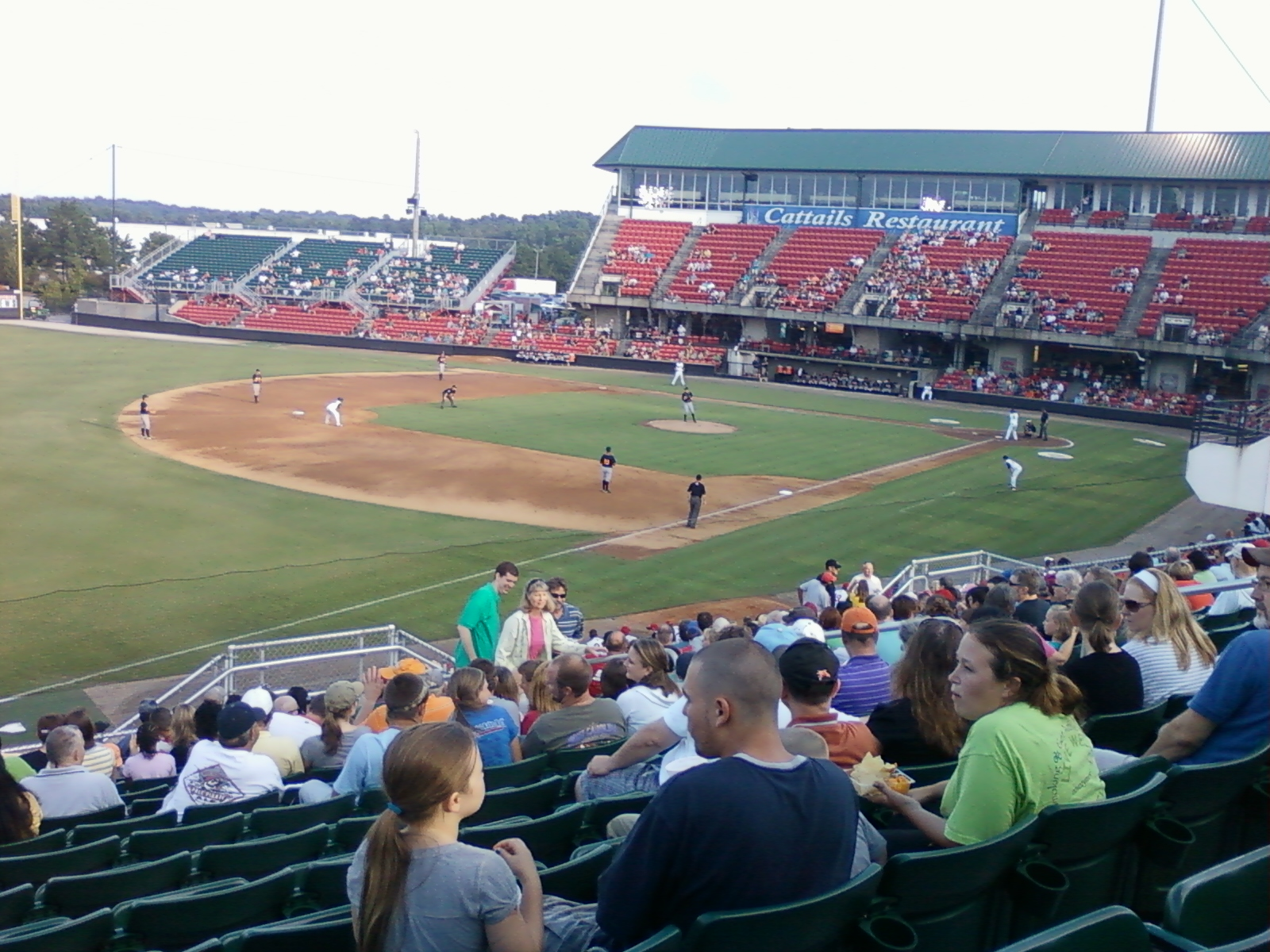
The Mudcats (in white) play the Montgomery Biscuits

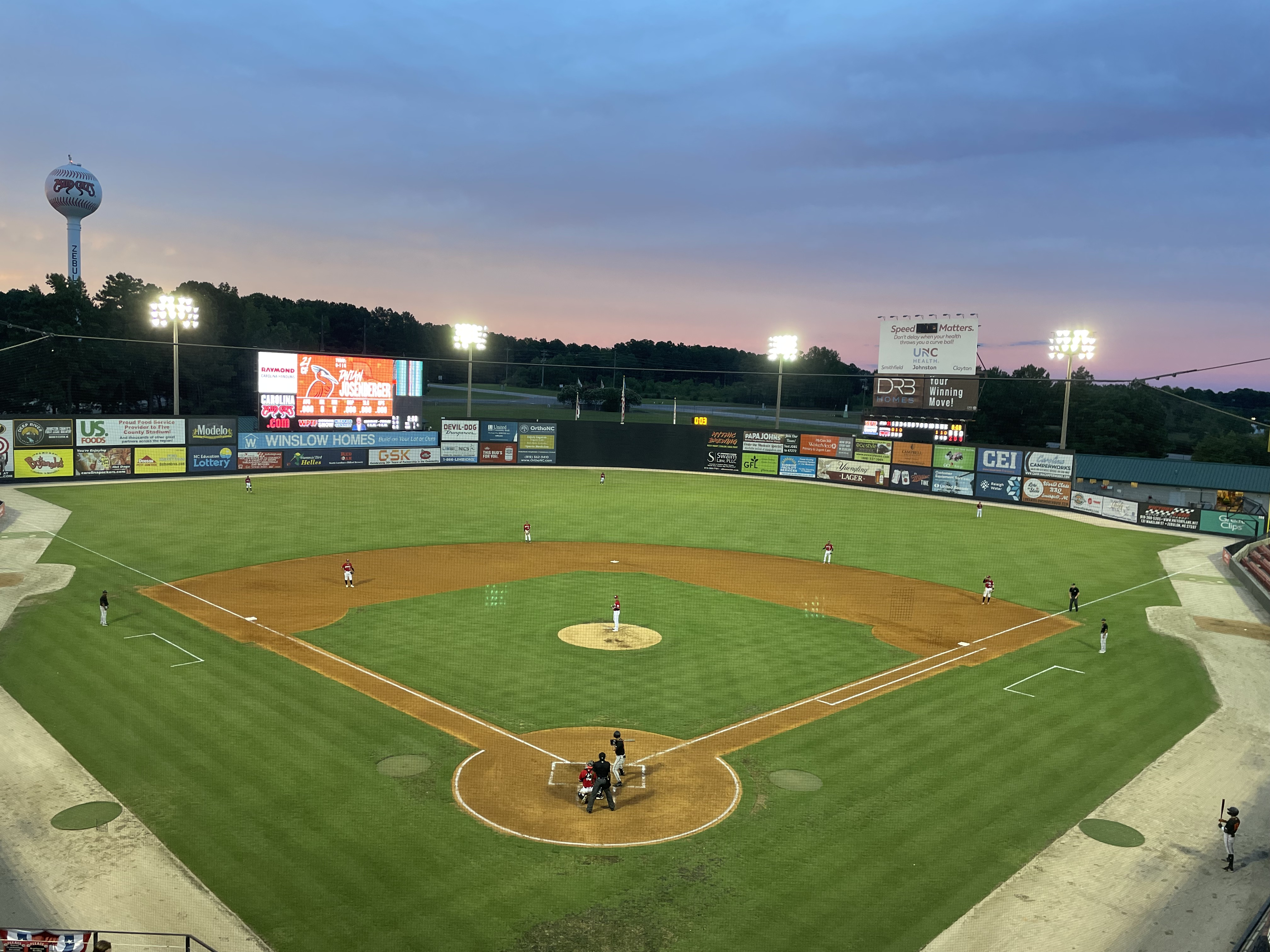
Nomaco Park at sunset during a game in August 2023
