= Northwest Federal Field at Pfitzner Stadium =

Stadium in Woodbridge, Virginia

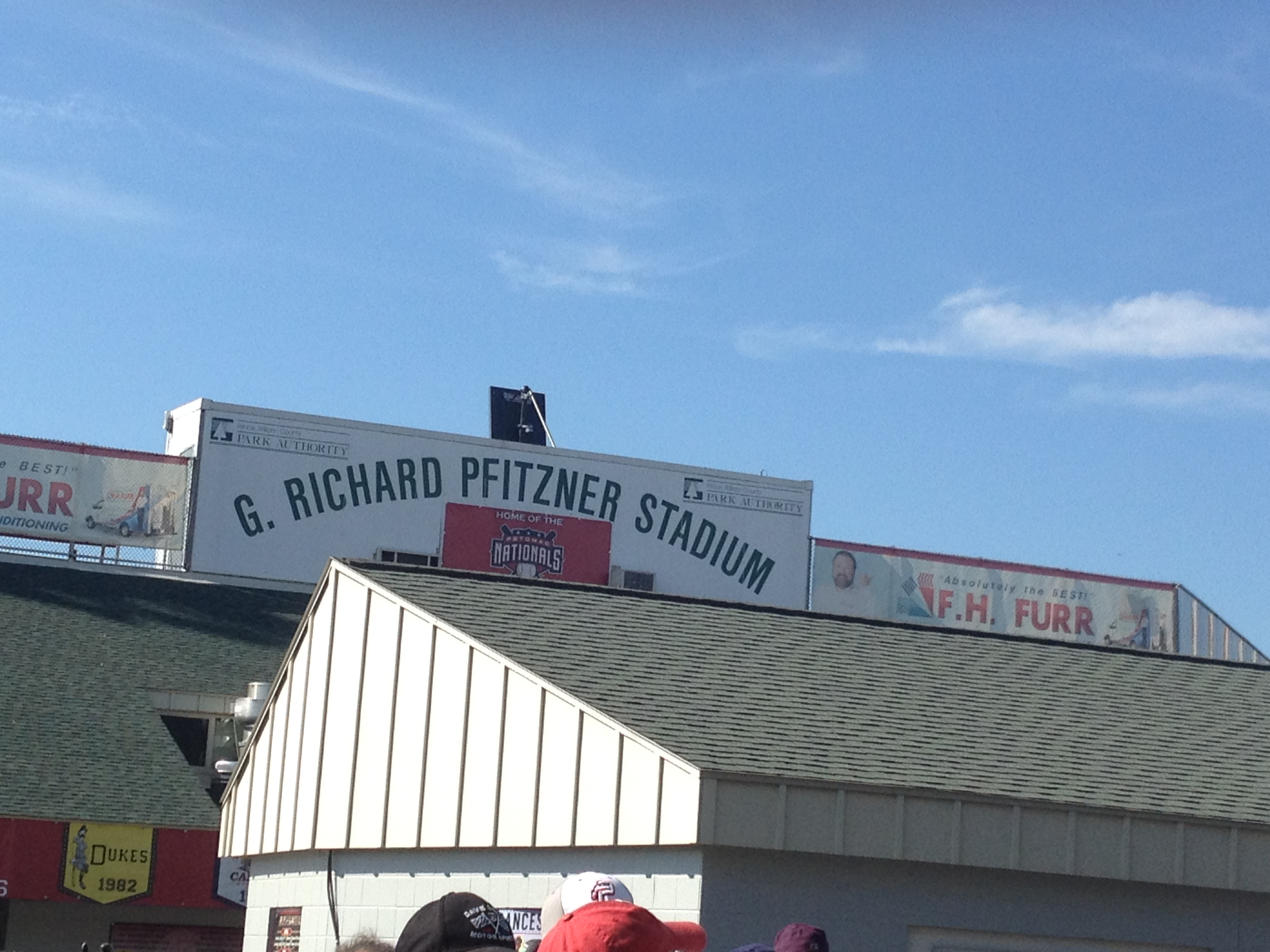
- Interactive map of Northwest Federal Field at Pfitzner Stadium
- Former names: Davis Ford Park (1984–1985); Prince William County Stadium (1986–1995); G. Richard Pfitzner Stadium (1996–2017)
- Location: 7 County Complex Court; Woodbridge, Virginia 22192
- Coordinates: 38°41′3″N 77°21′9″W
- Owner: Prince William County Park Authority
- Operator: Potomac Baseball LLC.
- Capacity: 6,000
- Surface: Patriot Bermuda Grass
- Scoreboard: Daktronics BA-2026
- Record attendance: 10,789 (July 4, 2009)
- Field size: Left Field: 315; Center Field: 400; Right Field: 315

Construction
- Groundbreaking: 1983
- Opened: April 19, 1984
- Cost: $2 million ($6.2 million in 2025 dollars)
- Architect: Hughes Group Architects

Tenant
- Potomac Nationals (CL) 1984–2019

Northwest Federal Field at Pfitzner Stadium, nicknamed "The Pfitz", is a stadium in the Coles Magisterial District of Prince William County, Virginia. It is primarily used for baseball, and was the home field of the Potomac Nationals before they relocated to Fredericksburg in 2020. Built in 1984, the stadium is near the McCoart Government Center, the offices of the Prince William County Service Authority, and the Sean Connaughton Community Plaza. It seats 6,000 people.

== Layout ==
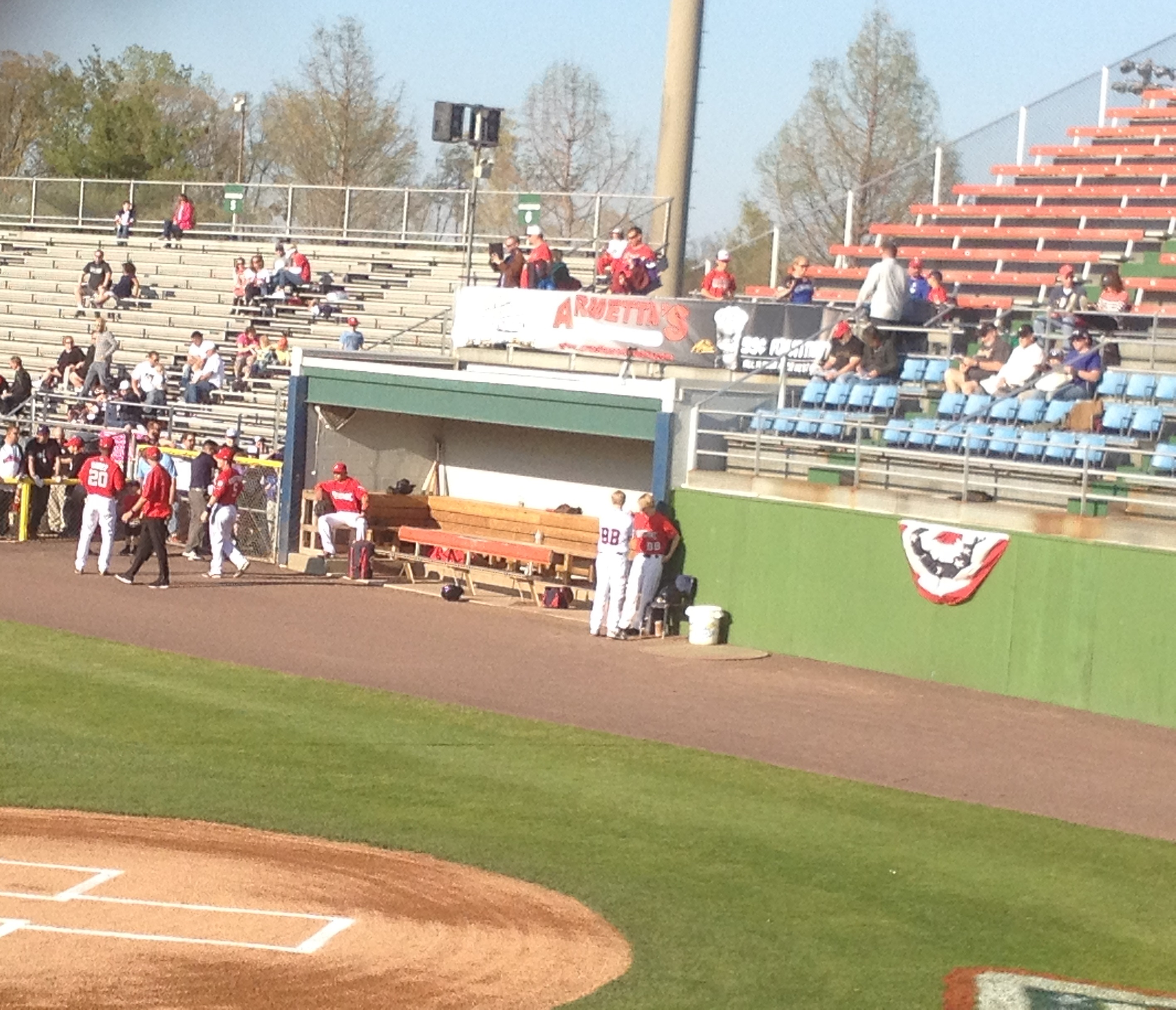
The unique dugouts at Pfitzner Stadium prior to the addition of protective netting in 2018.

The fences at Pfitzner Stadium are 315 feet down the lines and 400 feet to straight-away center field. There is an electronic scoreboard in left-center field capable of displaying images as well as some video. The dugouts at the stadium are unusual in that they are located at field level, and prior to 2018 there was no fence or rail separating them from the field. However, as part of renovations completed following the 2017 season, netting was added in front of both the home and visiting dugouts.

== History ==
=== 2011–2012 improvements ===
After the 2011 season, the field was redone to upgrade it to MLB specifications, as the previous field failed to meet those standards. This was done due to moving a series because of unsafe conditions.

=== 2012 fire ===
A one-alarm fire caused by an inside gas leak destroyed the facility's business offices on June 29, 2012. There were no fatalities or injuries. Other parts of the stadium, including the concession stands one level below the offices, were not damaged. The fire put the Nationals' mascot Uncle Slam out of action for the remainder of the Carolina League season.

== Naming history ==
The stadium was originally known as Davis Ford Park before being renamed Prince William County Stadium in 1986 and then G. Richard Pfitzner Stadium in 1996.

On May 3, 2018, the Potomac Nationals announced that as part of a sponsorship deal with Northwest Federal Credit Union, the stadium would be renamed Northwest Federal Field at Pfitzner Stadium. The naming rights deal also included the stadium's field tarp and bullpen picnic area.

== Potomac Nationals occupation ==
=== Departure of the Potomac Nationals ===
The Potomac Nationals, playing at Pfitzner Stadium since 1984, began seeking a better ballpark at least as early as 1998, with various proposals made in 2000, 2002, 2005, 2010, 2011, and 2016.

In December 2016 reports emerged of a possible new Potomac Nationals stadium. Two County Supervisors said that team owner Art Silber told them Minor League Baseball is requiring the team to be out of Pfitzner Stadium by the end of the 2018 season.

In June 2018, Potomac Nationals owner Art Silber announced that he had signed a letter of intent to build a new stadium in Fredericksburg, Virginia that would open in April 2020, though the deal actually calls for the facility to be ready for public events by April 1, 2021. The Potomac Nationals played their last regular season game at Pfitzner Stadium on August 29, 2019.
