= Nymeo Field at Harry Grove Stadium =

Home of the Frederick Keys High-A Minor League Baseball team

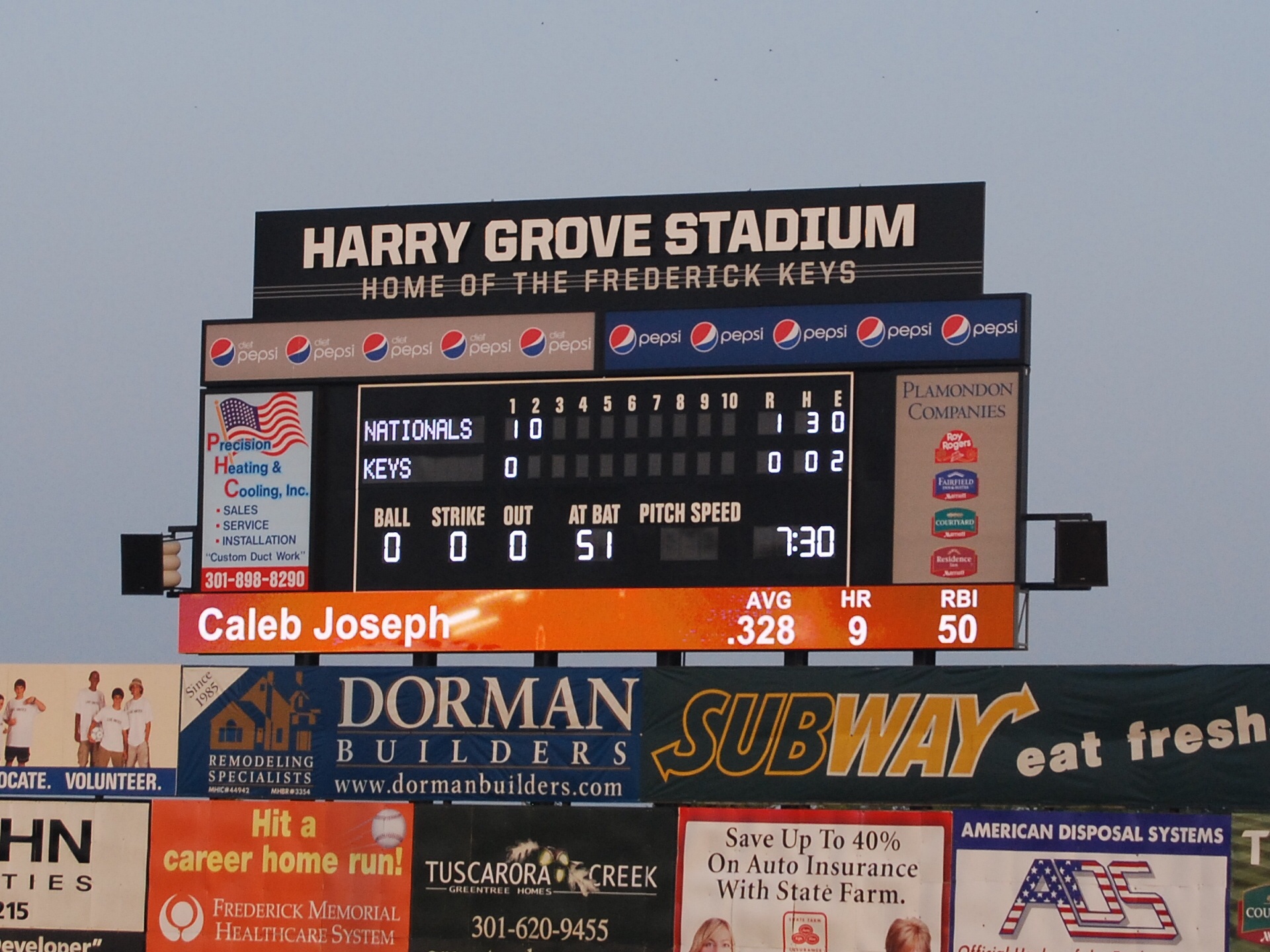
- The Harry Grove Stadium scoreboard in August 2009
- Interactive map of Nymeo Field at Harry Grove Stadium
- Location: 21 Stadium Drive; Frederick, Maryland 21703
- Coordinates: 39°24′05″N 77°24′48″W
- Owner: City of Frederick
- Operator: Maryland Baseball Holding LLC (Attain Sports and Entertainment)
- Capacity: 5,400
- Surface: Grass
- Record attendance: 11,006 on August 30, 1997
- Field size: Left Field: 325 feet Center Field: 400 feet Right Field: 325 feet

Construction
- Groundbreaking: July 23, 1989
- Opened: April 19, 1990
- Renovated: 2005, 2006, 2008
- Cost: $7 million ($17.3 million in 2025 dollars)
- Architect: Ellerbe Becket
- Project manager: Opening Day Partners
- Structural engineer: Harper & Kerr, P. A.
- General contractor: Morgan-Keller Inc.

Tenants
- Frederick Keys (CL/MLB Draft League/SAL) 1990–present Spire City Ghost Hounds (ALPB) 2023–present Frederick Regiment (MFB) 1998

Nymeo Field at Harry Grove Stadium, located in Frederick, Maryland, is the home of the Frederick Keys, a Minor League Baseball team of the South Atlantic League. Opened in 1990, it seats 5,400 fans.

== History ==
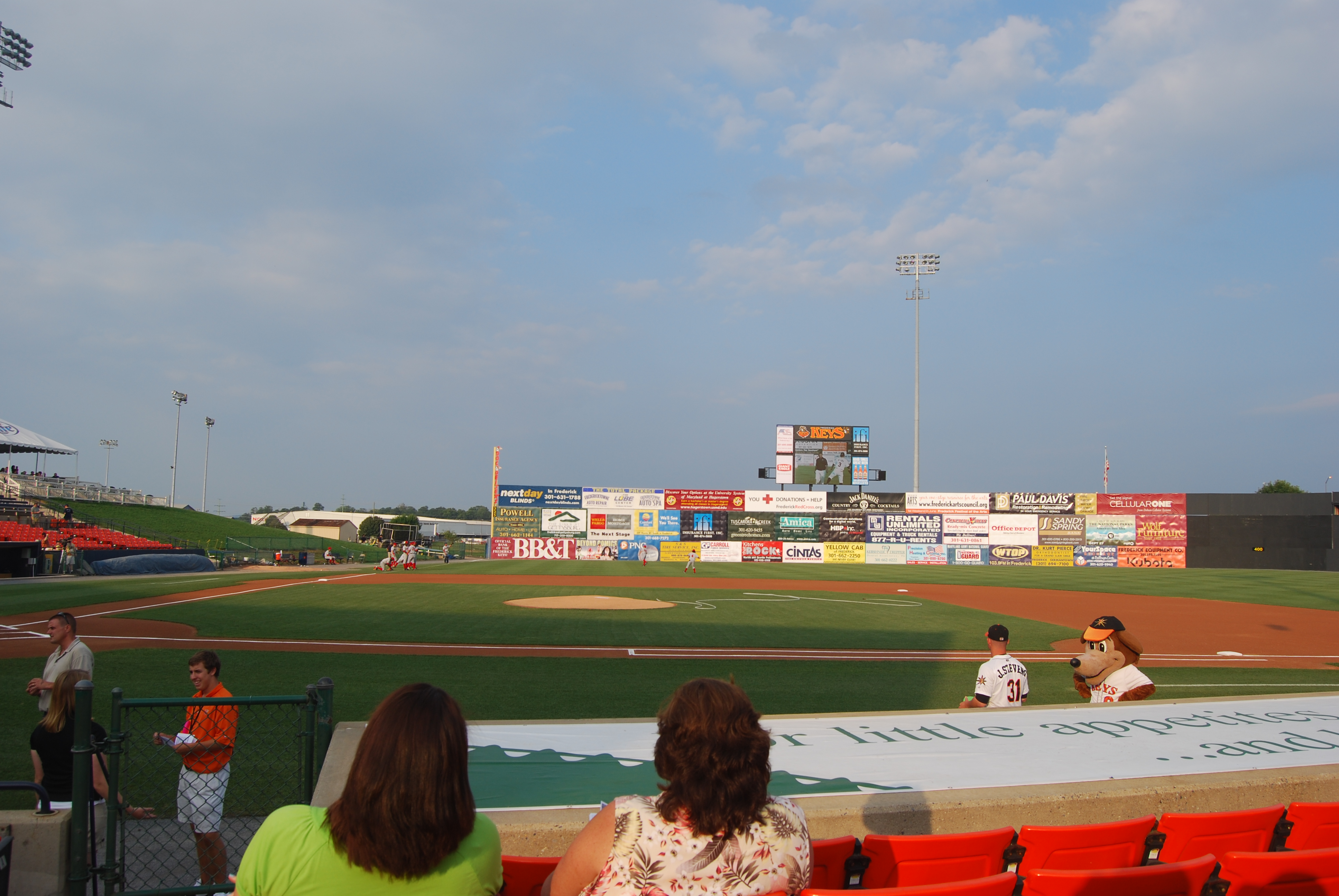
Harry Grove Stadium in August 2009.

The stadium is named for Harry Grove, who was one of the founders of the Frederick Hustlers, a professional team that existed between 1915 and the World War II era. The Grove family also donated $250,000 to the city to help build the park and were thus honored in the naming of it. Another $1 million was provided by the city of Frederick along with $1.5 million provided by the state of Maryland and $250,000 from Frederick County.

The 2005 Class A all-star game, pitting the Carolina League against the California League, was played in Harry Grove Stadium.

Harry Grove Stadium has also hosted various concerts. On August 19, 2006, Bob Dylan played to a sell-out crowd during his third annual 'Summer Minor League Baseball Park Tour'. The World Wrestling Entertainment (WWE) has made it an annual summer stop on its live event tours, a rarity in that the stadium is an outdoor venue.

Harry Grove Stadium also serves host to several autocross clubs, who use the lower lot for their autocross course.

In 1998, the stadium hosted the Frederick Regiment, a team in the single-season Maryland Fall Baseball league. The Spire City Ghost Hounds of the Atlantic League of Professional Baseball began to play here in April 2023.

== Renovations ==
In 2006, Keys ownership began a project to revitalize Harry Grove Stadium. Renovations included a new field, seating section, suite level restoration and a new lighting system.

A new scoreboard and videoboard and audio visual equipment were in place for the 2009 season.

Further 2009 upgrades included public restrooms that have been completely renovated along with those in the clubhouse, and multiple improvements to bring Harry Grove Stadium into compliance with the Americans with Disabilities Act.

In August 2024, the Frederick Keys and the city of Frederick announced that the Maryland Stadium Authority had agreed to fund $39 million in upgrades to Harry Grove Stadium to help bring affiliated minor league baseball back to Frederick. Construction is expected to begin in 2025 and continue into 2026, but it is not expected to disrupt the playing season.

On August 1, 2025, the Keys announced that they would once again serve as the Class A-Advanced (now called High-A) affiliate of the Baltimore Orioles starting in 2026, replacing the Aberdeen IronBirds.

== Naming rights ==
On December 5, 2013, the Frederick Mayor and Board of Aldermen approved an amended contract that will allow the Frederick Keys to seek a sponsor for stadium naming rights while retaining "Harry Grove" as part of the name. Mayor Randy McClement said, "The stadium is always going to be Harry Grove Stadium. But the idea behind naming rights is to look at portions of the stadium that could used for naming rights." The city will get 35% of the net profit from the naming fees with the remainder going to the team. On February 5, 2015, the Frederick Keys announced a deal had been reached with Nymeo Federal Credit Union to use the name "Nymeo Field at Harry Grove Stadium."
