= Bank of the James Stadium =

Ballpark in Lynchburg, Virginia

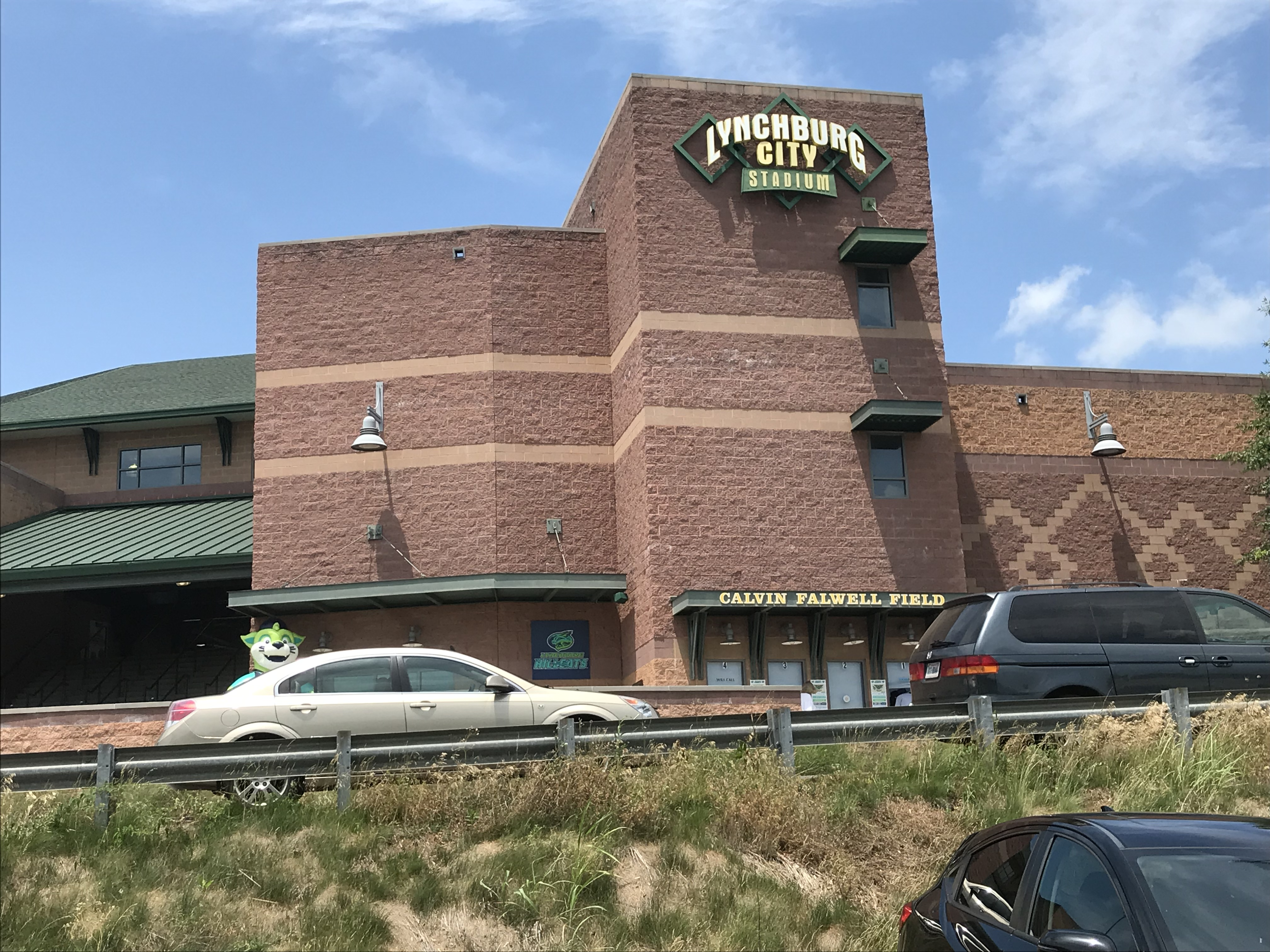
- Interactive map of Bank of the James Stadium
- Former names: Calvin Falwell Field at City Stadium (2005–2019); City Stadium (1940–2004)
- Location: 3180 Fort Avenue; Lynchburg, Virginia 25401
- Coordinates: 37.392816°N 79.165623°W
- Owner: City of Lynchburg
- Operator: Hillcats Baseball LLC (2024–present)
- Capacity: 4,281
- Surface: Grass
- Field size: Right Field – 325 ft (99 m); Center Field – 390 ft (120 m); Left Field – 325 ft (99 m)

Construction
- Groundbreaking: 1938
- Opened: April 11, 1940
- Renovated: 2004
- Cost: US$280,000 ($6.48 million in 2025 dollars)
- Architect: Gavin Hadden

Tenants
- Lynchburg Senators (VL) 1940–1942; Lynchburg Cardinals (PL) 1943-1955; Lynchburg Senators (ApL) 1959; Savannah/Lynchburg White Sox (SAL) 1962; Lynchburg White Sox (SAL) 1963; Lynchburg White Sox (SL) 1964–1965; Lynchburg White Sox (CL) 1966–1969; Lynchburg Twins (CL) 1970–1974; Lynchburg Rangers (CL) 1975; Lynchburg Mets (CL) 1976–1987; Lynchburg Red Sox (CL) 1988–1994; Hill City Howlers (CL) 1995–present

Bank of the James Stadium, formerly Calvin Falwell Field at City Stadium and originally named "City Stadium", is a ballpark located in Lynchburg, Virginia, United States, and the current home of the minor league Hill City Howlers team.

The baseball stadium was built in conjunction with an adjacent 6,000-person football stadium known modern day as "City Stadium". The New York Yankees and the Brooklyn Dodgers played in the inaugural game at City Stadium (the baseball portion) on April 11, 1940, in front of an estimated crowd of 7,000. The following professional baseball teams have all fielded affiliates of their parent club in Lynchburg: the Washington Senators, St. Louis Cardinals, Chicago White Sox, Minnesota Twins, Texas Rangers, New York Mets, Boston Red Sox, Pittsburgh Pirates, Cincinnati Reds, and Atlanta Braves. The stadium is currently home to the Hill City Howlers of the Carolina League, and is one of the oldest active ballparks in Minor League Baseball. The Howlers have been an affiliate of the Cleveland Guardians since 2015. From 2010 to 2014 they were affiliated with the Atlanta Braves. In 2005, the Howlers set an attendance record with a total of 151,266 fans passing through the gates.

== Name ==
City Stadium opened in 1940. It was renovated and the field was renamed Calvin Falwell Field at City Stadium in 2004. In March 2020, the name was changed to Bank of the James Stadium when the city entered into a six-year naming rights deal worth $50,000 annually with Bank of the James, proceeds to be equally split between the city and the team.

== Renovations ==
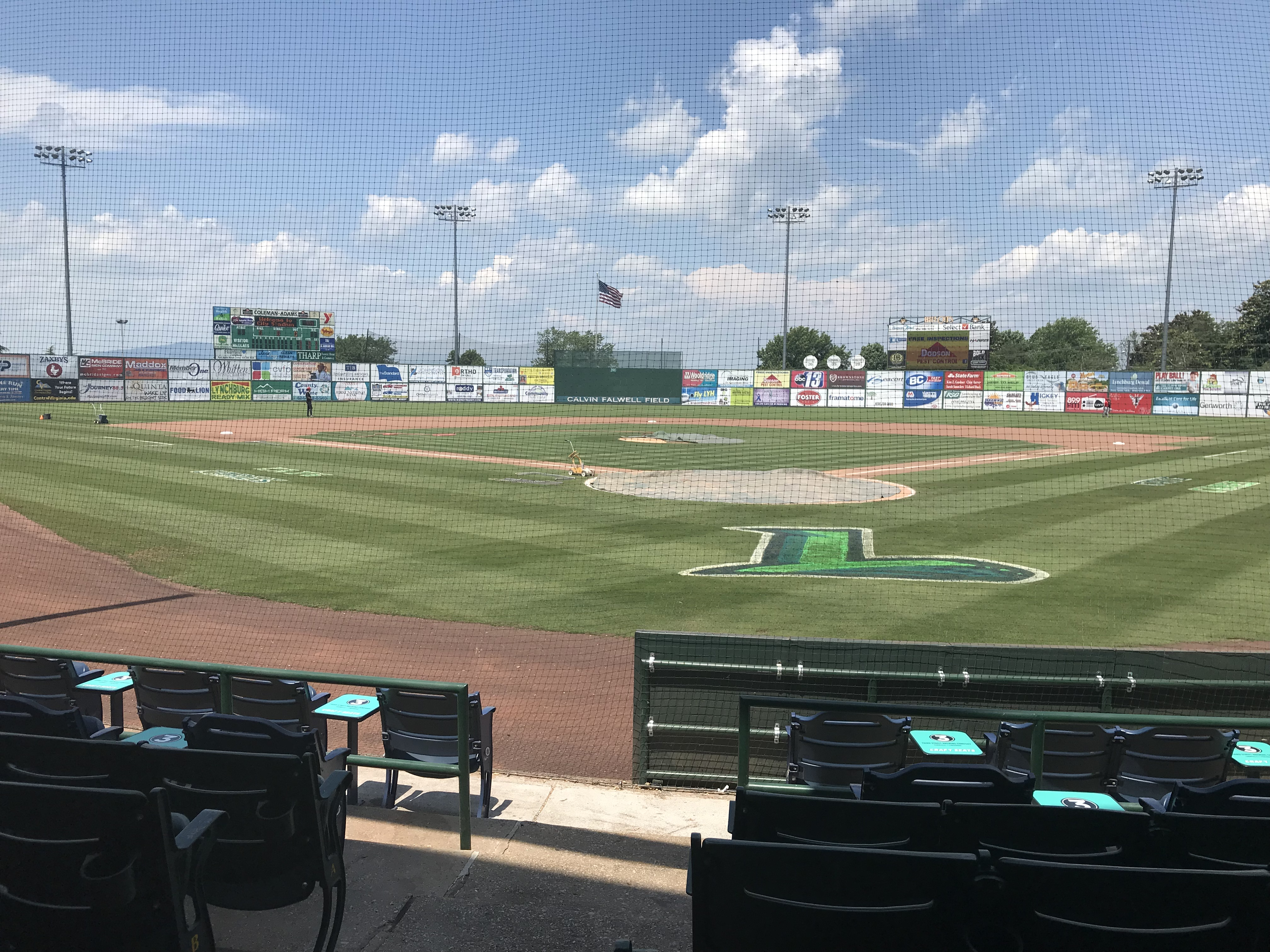
The interior of Calvin Falwell Field

The stadium has had many major renovations since its inception in 1939. The first major renovation occurred in 1978. The renovation included reconstructing the outfield fence, grandstand roof, grandstand screen and adding new lights. In 1981, a clubhouse was added to accommodate both the football and baseball stadiums. In 2002 plans began for a $6.5 million renovation to Lynchburg City Stadium. The renovation included a complete renovation of the concourse with the addition of seat back chairs, and two picnic areas. The renovation also included the addition of two new concession stands, eight luxury boxes, a new press box, arcade room, spacious bathrooms and a state-of-the-art scoreboard. Prior to the 2005 season, six new luxury boxes were added in addition to a video board in right field. In August 2004, the field was dedicated to Calvin F. Falwell, President of the Lynchburg Baseball Corporation since its inception in 1966.
