= Truist Stadium (Winston-Salem) =

Baseball stadium in Winston-Salem, North Carolina

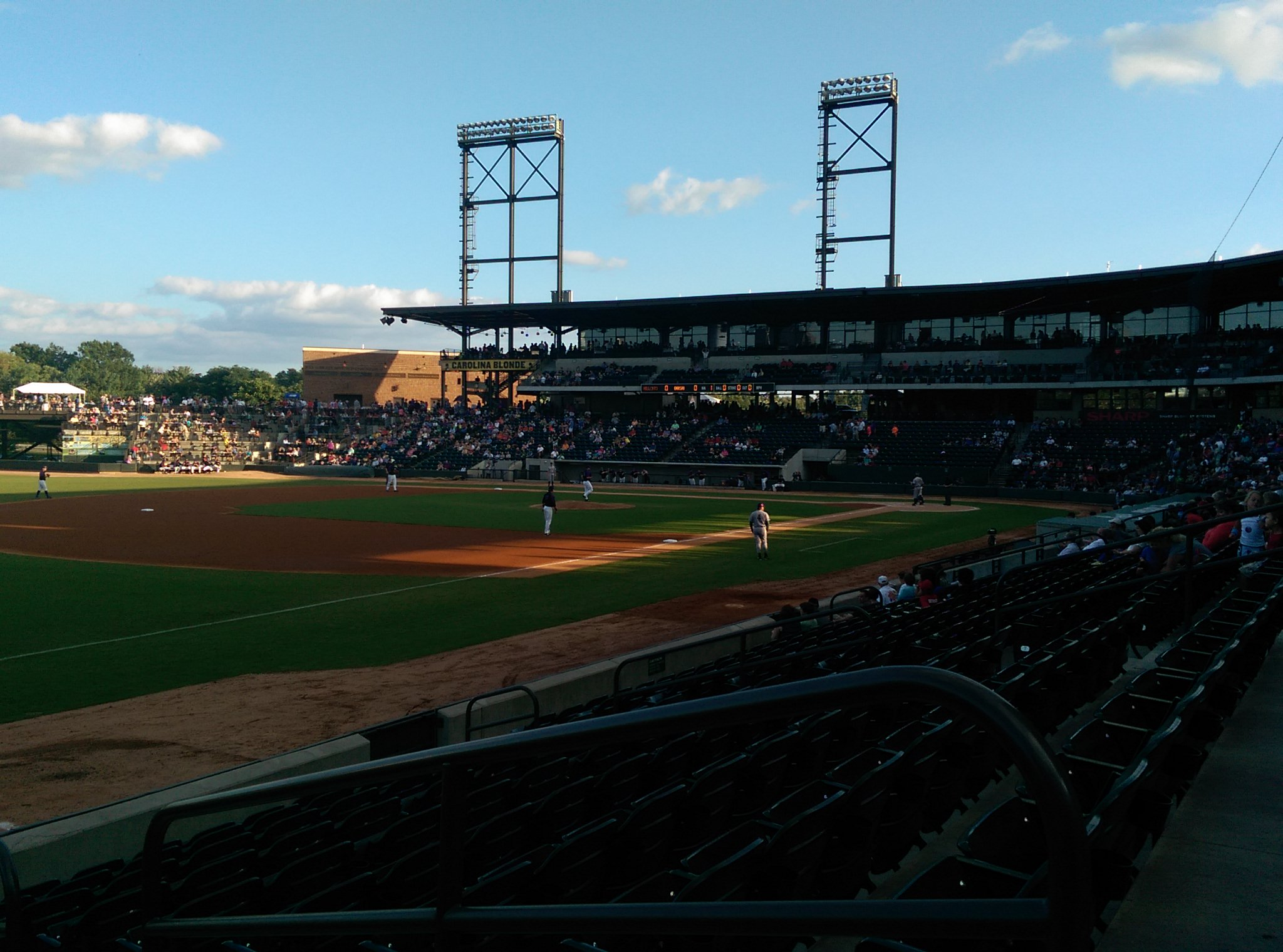

- Location within North Carolina Location within the United States
- Former names: BB&T Ballpark (2010–2020)
- Address: 951 Ballpark Way
- Location: Winston-Salem, NC 27101
- Coordinates: 36.091602°N 80.255962°W
- Owner: City of Winston-Salem
- Operator: Winston-Salem Dash LLC
- Capacity: 5,500
- Surface: Grass
- Field size: Left field: 315 ft (96 m); Center field: 399 ft (122 m); Right field: 323 ft (98 m)

Construction
- Groundbreaking: October 30, 2007
- Opened: April 10, 2010
- Cost: $48.7 million ($71.9 million in 2025 dollars)
- Architects: 360 Architecture; CJMW Architecture
- Structural engineers: City Structures D&P, Inc.
- General contractor: Samet Construction

Tenant
- Winston-Salem Dash (CL) 2010–present

Truist Stadium is a ballpark in Winston-Salem, North Carolina, United States, that replaced Ernie Shore Field. It is primarily used for baseball, and is the home field of the Winston-Salem Dash minor league baseball team.

The ballpark is bounded by Peters Creek Parkway (northwest/west); 1st Street (north); and Green Street (northeast, left-center field). Salem Parkway, which carries US 158 and US 421, is toward the south/southeast.

== History ==
It was originally planned to open for the 2009 season. Various delays pushed it to mid-2009, and then to the 2010 season. Oversights such as the budget, by city planners, were reported to be the cause.

The first home game was played on April 13, 2010, against the Potomac Nationals, resulting in a 5–4 loss in 12 innings, before 7,111 spectators. At the end of its first season, the stadium was named Ballpark of the Year by Baseballparks.com.

== Naming rights ==
On February 24, 2010, the Dash announced that Winston-Salem based bank BB&T had signed a 15-year naming rights deal for the new ballpark. BB&T also owned the naming rights for fellow Winston-Salem Entertainment-Sports Complex venue BB&T Field, home to the Wake Forest Demon Deacons football team.

This was the second ballpark in the Carolina League sponsored by BB&T. The first was BB&T Coastal Field (now TicketReturn.com Field at Pelicans Ballpark), home to the Myrtle Beach Pelicans. BB&T also sponsored BB&T Ballpark (now Truist Field) for the Charlotte Knights which opened in the spring of 2014.

The ballpark was renamed Truist Stadium in June 2020 due to the 2019 merger of BB&T and SunTrust Banks to form Truist.
