= Frederick Hustlers =

- 1915–1928; (1915–1917, 1920–1930); Frederick, Maryland

Minor league affiliations
- Class: Class D (1915–1917, 1920–1930)
- League: Blue Ridge League (1915–1917, 1920–1930)

Major league affiliations
- Team: Cleveland Indians ( 1929–1930)

Minor league titles
- League titles (2): 1915; 1921
- Conference titles (2): 1915; 1921
- Wild card berths (1): 1926

Team data
- Name: Frederick Hustlers (1915); Frederick Champs (1916); Frederick Hustlers (1917, 1920–1928); Frederick Warriors (1929–1930)
- Ballpark: Frederick Fairgrounds (1915–1917, 1920–1923); McCurdy Field (1924–1930)

The Frederick Hustlers were a minor league baseball team based in the city of Frederick, Maryland, within Frederick County, Maryland. Between 1915 and 1930, the Frederick teams played exclusively as members of the Class D level Blue Ridge League, winning league championships in 1915 and 1921.

The Hustlers were the first minor league team based in Frederick beginning a history of minor league baseball leading to today's Frederick Keys, who were established in 1989.

Frederick became known as the "Warriors" in 1929, as the team was a minor league affiliate for the first time, becoming the first formal farm team of the Cleveland Indians.

In the era, Fredirick teams first hosted home minor league games at Agricultural Park (located within the Frederick Fairgrounds) from 1915 to 1923 before moving to the newly constructed McCurdy Field beginning in 1924 through 1930. Both the Frederick Fairgrounds and McCurdy Field are still in use today.

Following their championship season in 1915, Frederick hosted an exhibition game against the Philadelphia Athletics.

== History ==
=== Early Frederick baseball history ===
The city of Frederick, Maryland is the county seat of Frederick County, Maryland. Originally called Frederick Town, the city was founded in 1745. In 1776, following US independence, the original Frederick County land was divided into three separate counties. The western portion of the county became Washington County, Maryland, named after George Washington. The southern portion was divided and became Montgomery County, Maryland, named after Revolutionary War general, Richard Montgomery. The remaining Northeastern section continued to be known as Frederick County. In 1837, the county was divided again, when a portion of Frederick County was combined with a section of Baltimore County to form Carroll County, Maryland. Carroll County is to the east of today's Frederick County.

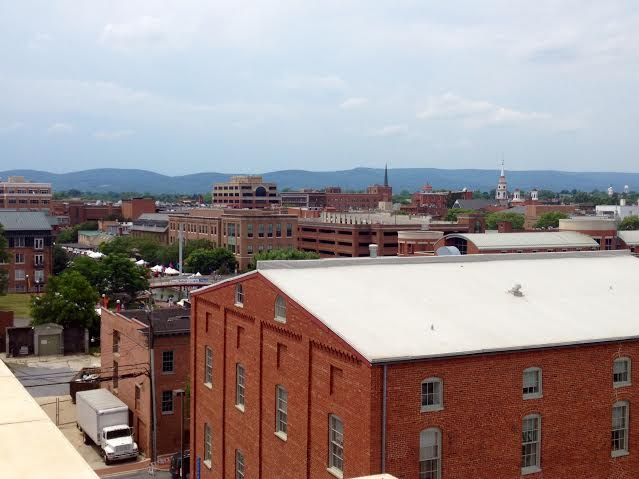
(2014) Downtown Frederick, Maryland with the Blue Ridge Mountains in the distance.

After many years of amateur baseball with town teams, a semi-pro baseball league was formed in the region in 1907. Called the Sunset League, this league included teams from Frederick and the city of Hagerstown, Maryland, located within Washington County. The Sunset League was so named because league games were played in the late afternoon and often lasted until sunset in the era before lighted fields. The Sunset League played through the 1911 season.

A native of Frederick, future major league umpire Dick Nallin played for the 1909 Frederick team in the Sunset League.

For the 1914 season, the semi-pro Tri-City League was formed in the region. This league featured team based in Frederick, as well as teams from Hagerstown, and nearby Martinsburg, West Virginia. The Tri-City League had a successful 1914 season and evolved after one season to become the original Blue Ridge League in the 1915 season.

=== 1915: Blue Ridge League formed / Champions ===
During the fall of 1914, after the success of the Sunset League, a movement began to form a professional baseball league with teams located in the Blue Ridge Mountains region. In the era, the National Commission was the governing body of all of professional baseball. The National Commission stipulated that any new professional minor league have a minimum of six member teams to be considered before applying for membership. Under those guidelines a new minor league was formed and organized. The league formation was led by Frank K. Schmidt of Frederick, Charles H. Boyer of Hagerstown and Max von Schlagel of Martinsburg. The new professional Blue Ridge League was organized with six teams and was subsequently approved by The National Commission to begin play for the 1915 season. In its first season, the Blue Ridge League headquarters were located in Hagerstown, Maryland. This was likely because Charles Boyer served at the first league president.

A local businessman, Frank K. Schmidt, operated the new Frederick minor league team, serving as president of the Frederick Baseball Association.

The 1915, the Frederick "Hustlers" became the first minor league baseball team based in Frederick, as the Hustlers became charter members of the newly formed Class D level, six–team, Blue Ridge League. The league was so named as it was located with member teams in the Blue Ridge Mountains region. The mountain range is located in the Eastern United States, extending a total of 550 miles (885 km) through portions of the states of Pennsylvania, Maryland, West Virginia, Virginia, North Carolina, South Carolina, Tennessee, and Georgia. The Blue Ridge League member teams were all located on the northern region of the Blue Ridge Mountains.

The Frederick Hustlers joined with the Chambersburg Maroons, Gettysburg Patriots, Hagerstown Blues, Hanover Hornets and Martinsburg Champs (so named because Martinsburg had been the champions in the defunct Tri-City League the league prior) in the newly formed league. The first Blue Ridge League schedule began with opening day games held on May 27, 1915.

In the era of its first minor league team, the city Frederick, Maryland was home to roughly 11,000 residents. Frederick County had 52,000 residents in the era.

In their first season of minor league play, the Frederick Hustlers hosted their home games at Agricultural Park. Agricultural Park itself was located within the Frederick Fairgrounds. Frederick teams played home minor league games at the ballpark through the 1923 season. In the era, the site was host to The Great Frederick Fair, which began in 1822 and is still held annually today.

A second baseman, Jack Morrison was named as the Frederick Hustlers' player/manager for the newly formed team, his first managerial role. Morrison came to Frederick having played the 1914 season with the York White Roses in the Tri-State League.

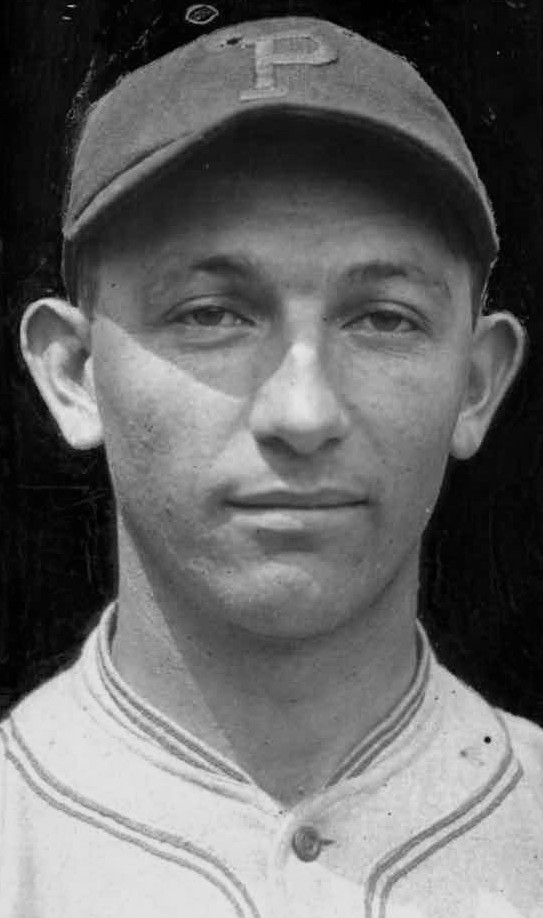
(1921) Clyde Barnhart, outfielder/third baseman Pittsburgh Pirates. Barnhart twice led the league in home runs while playing for Frederick in 1915 and 1916.

In beginning their first season of play, the Frederick Hustlers won 14 of their first 16 games in the Blue Ridge League.

The Fredeick Hustlers became the Blue Ridge League champions is their first season. The Hustlers ended the season with a record of 53–23, to finish in first place in the final standings, led their championship by manager Jack Morrison. Finished 8.0 games ahead of the second-place Martinsburg Champs. No playoffs were held and the season standings determined the league champion.

The Hustlers had some notable individual players in the league statistics. 28-year-old Bobbie Orrison of Frederick won the Blue Ridge League batting title, hitting .341 for the 1915 season, with a league leading 104 total hits. At age 19, Clyde Barnhart hit 6 home runs, to lead the Blue Ridge League, while batting .254 in 77 games. 22-year-old Hustlers' pitcher Bill King won a Blue Ridge League leading 17 games on the season. A Frederick native, King was a graduate of Boys High School in Frederick. King would play his entire 11 season minor league career pitching for his hometown team.

The Frederick team had five future major league players on its roster in Clyde Barnhart, Tim Connolly, Bill Lamar, Lew Malone and Jim Stevens.

At age 18, infielder Lew Malone was in his first professional season and played with the Frederick Hustlers, also making his major league debut with the Philadelphia Athletics that season. After his partial season with the Hustlers, Malone played 133 total games in the major leagues from 1915 to 1919 for the Philadelphia Athletics and Brooklyn Robins, batting .202 with 28 career RBIs. Malone's career was interrupted while he served in World War I and after returning from the war I, Malone continued to played in the minor leagues through 1929. His first and only major league home run came in the 1915 season, at the age of 18 years and 174 days. Malone is believed to be the youngest major league player ever to hit his final home run.

Infielder Tom Connolly batted .309 for Frederick in 20 games at age 22, before playing the remainder of the season with the Washington Senators. He batted .184 in 50 games for the Senators in his only major league action. Following his 1915 season, Connolly continued to play in the minor leagues at the high Class A level through the 1927 season.

Playing in the first of his three seasons with Frederick, Clyde Barnhart went on to a major league career. Barnhart played 814 games with the Pittsburgh Pirates between 1920 and 1928, compiling a career batting average of .295 before his major league career was shortened by injuries. Barnhart played on the 1925 World Series champion Pittsburgh Pirates team. He batted .273 with 9 RBIs in 11 career World Series games.

A native of Rockville, Maryland, left-handed hitting Outfielder Bill Lamar batted .305 in 77 games with 1 home run and 18 stolen bases, playing for the Hustlers at ate 18. After playing for the Baltimore Orioles in 1916, Lamar advanced to play 9 seasons in the major leagues and had a lifetime .310 batting average and 18 career home runs, 114 doubled and 23 triples. He played in 550 career major league games with the New York Yankees (1917–1919), Boston Red Sox (1919), Brooklyn Robins (1920–1921) and Philadelphia Athletics (1924–1927)

In leading his team to the championship, player/manager Jack Morrison batted .250 with 2 home runs and 11 stolen bases in 73 games.

==== 1915 Major league exhibition game ====
After the 1915 Blue Ridge Mountain League season had concluded, the Philadelphia Athletics played an exhibition game at Agricultural Park against the Blue Ridge League champion Frederick Hustlers. The game was held on August 31, 1915, and the A's won the game, 6-3, scoring three runs in the ninth inning against Frederick pitcher Harry Llewellyn. The legendary Connie Mack was the Philadelphia manager. Baseball Hall of Fame member Nap Lajoie had a double, a home run and 3 RBIs in the game for Philadelphia. The game was held with the Athletics sitting as the defending American League champions. The 1914 Athletics had won the American League pennant and played in the 1914 World Series. However, the 1915 Philadelphia Athletics season was a struggle as the team eventually finished last in the American League with a 43–109 record.

=== 1916 & 1917: Blue Ridge League ===
The Blue Ridge League continued play in its second season in 1916 with Vincent Jameson now serving as league president, beginning a long tenure of serving the league in that role. After winning the championship in their first season, Frederick was known as the "Champs" for the 1916. After leading Frederick to the championship, Jack Morrison returned to the Frederick Hustlers as their player/manager. fifth place 47–51. 9.0 games behind the first place Chambersburg Maroons. Clyde Barnhart again led the league in home runs, hitting 9 on the season. He also won the league batting championship, hitting, .335 in 61 games.

Player/manager Jack Morrison batted .231 with 2 home runs in 92 games. It was his final season in professional baseball.

With a new manager, the Frederick Hustlers returned to their former nickname for the 1917 Blue Ridge League season and Tom Crooke became the Hustlers player/manager in at age 32. A first baseman, Crooke had played briefly in the major leagues, batting .214 with 3 RBIs in 11 total games with the Washington Senators in 1909 and 1910. Fredirick Hustlers

1917 fifth place for the second season in a row. 44–55. 18.0 games behind the first place Hagerstown Terriers.

Tom Crooke batted .229 with 0 home runs in 95 games in his only career managerial role.

Clyde Barhart played his third and final season with Frederick in 1917, batting .256 with 6 home runs at age 21. He made his major league debut with the Pittsburgh Pirates in 1920.

Infielder Bill Phoenix and pitcher Walter Warwick both batted .306 on the 1917 season for Frederick to finish among the league leaders. Warwick hit 8 home runs, Phoenix had 0. At age 29, Warwick had a 20–11 record as a pitcher with a 2.40 ERA in 34 games and 262 innings on the mound, issuing only 58 bases on balls for the season.

On March 6, 1918, a Blue Ridge League meeting was held at the Hamilton Hotel in Hagerstown, Maryland to discuss the upcoming 1918 season. Team representatives at the meeting were Frank K. Schmidt of Frederick, Colonel N. Russler of Cumberland, J. C. Roulette, T. B. South, and W. C. Conley of Hagerstown, and C. A. Miller, E. C. Shepherd, and Max von Schlagel of Martinsburg. The meeting was held to decide the direction of the league for the 1918 season, as only 10 total minor leagues were looking to play a 1918 season, with the country focused on World War I and many players serving in the military. Hagerstown, Cumberland, and Frederick committing play in the upcoming season and it was decided to play as a four-team league in 1918. Martinsburg, West Virginia agreed to be the fourth league team.

On May 10, 1918, just before the Blue Ridge League season was scheduled to begin play, Frank K. Schmidt announced that his Frederick club would not be able to play in 1918 season due to a lack of financial support, with team financial partners instead investing in efforts concerning World War I. With Frederick’s sudden announcement, Piedmont, West Virginia agreed on May 13, 1918, replace Frederick as fourth team and the league rescheduled opening day for May 28, giving Piedmont just two weeks to field a team and prepare their ballpark. With Hagerstown, Martinsburg, Cumberland, and Piedmont continuing play, the league folded early in the 1918 season due to the lack of available players and subsequent financial concerns due to World War I. At the time the league folded, it was the only Class D level league playing a 1918 season. The Cumberland Colts were in first place with an 11-7 record when the league stopped play.

Subsequently, the Blue Ridge League did not play in 1919.

=== 1920: Blue Ridge League reformed ===
In 1920, the Blue Ridge League reformed after not playing the 1919. Vincent Jameson resumed his role as the league president. The Fredirick Hustlers rejoined as a member, as the league resumed play as a six-team Class D level league. the Chambersburg Maroons and Hanover Raiders also rejoined the league. The Waynesboro Red Birds and Frederick replaced the former Gettysburg and Piedmont teams in the 1920 Blue Ridge League.

Buck Ramsey was named as the Frederick player/manager for the 1920 season. In his career, Ramsey pitched 17 minor league seasons between 1904 to 1925. Playing for the Pittsburgh Filipinos of the 1913 Federal League, Ramsey led the league with 31 starts, 28 complete games, and 6 shutouts.

In returning to league play, Fredeirck Hustlers finished the 1920 season as the league runner=up. The Hustlers ended the season with a 53–40 record, playing the Blue Ridge League season under pitcher / manager Buck Ramsey. Frederick finished 1½ games behind the first place Hagerstown Champs in the final standings as the league had no playoffs until 1926.

Buck Ramsey had a 14–6 record pitching for the Hustlers at age 41. Playing the first of six seasons with Frederick at age 29, Joe Neptune was the shortstop for the Hustlers and batted .342 with 1 home run, 2 doubles and 16 fielding errors in 41 games.

=== 1921: Blue Ridge League championshp ===
The Hustlers continued membership with a successful season in the 1921 Blue Ridge League, as the league remained a six-team Class D level league. Manager Buck Ramsey continued his tenure as the Frederick player/manger and led the Hustlers to the league championship.

During the season, Frederick swept a doubleheader on the road against the Hanover Raiders on July 4, 1921. Frederick defeated Hanover by scores of 9–3 and 9–1. The Hustlers ended the day in second place with a 25–19 record, sitting behind the first place Waynesboro Villagers, who had a 26–18 record on that date. After their doubleheader sweep on the road, Frederick was scheduled to host Hanover at home on Tuesday, July 5, 1921, with a 3:30PM start time.

In the final league standings, the Frederick Hustlers placed first in the six–team Blue Ridge League Class D level league season. Frederick ended the season with a record of 52–45 to finish 4.0 games ahead of the second place Hanover Raiders playing the entire season under Buck Ramsey. No playoffs were held. Frederick pitcher William King pitched to a league best 23-7 record on the season. Player/manager Buck Ramsey aided in the team's success, as he had a 10-6 record while pitching in 20 games at age 42. Playing at age 17, catcher Beany Stover led the team with 10 home runs while batting .270 in 82 games. A native of Bath, Maine, Stover returned to Frederick the next season and played in 14 games in 1922, his final professional season at age 18.

In his second season with Frederick, dual player Clarence Blethen batted .321 for Frederick in 98 games and as a pitcher he compiled a 9–3 record in 20 games. He played as an outfielder in the field. Blethen reamined with Frederick through the 1923 season, when he joined the Boston Red Sox for 5 games as a pitcher at the end of the season. He later pitched in 3 games for the 1929 Brooklyn Dodgers. Blethen played in the minor leagues until 1938, when he was 44 years old.

At the end of their 1921 championship season, Frederick Hustlers' manager Buck Ramsey was selected as the manager of the league all-star team as determined by various league member newspapers. Frederick outfielder Evan "Tubbie" Miller, second baseman Joe Neptune, catcher Beanie Stover, utility player Clarence Blethen and pitcher Bill King were all selected to the Blue Ridge League all-star team.

=== 1922 to 1925: Blue Ridge League ===
In 1922, the Hustlers defended their league championship, as Frederick continued play in the six-team Blue Ridge League. On opening day May 16, 1922, Frederick hosted Hagerstown at home to begin the season.

During the 1922 season, the Martinsburg Blue Sox starting pitcher, E.J. Seaman hit three home runs in a game against Frederick. In another game between the two teams, Martinsburg hit seven total home runs as a team against Frederick.

As defending champions, the 1922 Frederick Hustlers placed third in the Blue Ridge League final standings. The Hustlers had a 54–44 record in the six–team league, as Frederick finished 3½ games behind the first place Martinsburg Blue Sox. Frederick continued play under manager Buck Ramsey. Beginning in 1922 and continuing through 1927, the champion of the Blue Ridge League played the champion of the Eastern Shore League in a championship playoff called the "Five-State Championship Series". The Frederick Hustlers teams did not advance to any of the playoffs. Hustlers pitcher Bill King remained with the Frederick and led all Blue Ridge League ptitchers with 139 strikeouts. In his third and final season as the Frederick player/manager, Buck Ramsey pitched to a 10-4 record at age 43.

The 1923 Frederick Hustlers had a new manager for the 1923 Blue Ridge League season. Replacing Buck Ramsey, 30 year old catcher Norm McNeil became the Frederick Hustlers' player/manager for the 1923 season. McNeil had played briefly for the 1919 Boston Red Sox, where he caught and played with teammate Babe Ruth, batting .333 in 6 games. The two became friends to the level that Ruth was the godfather of McNeil's son. With Fredrick in 1923, McNeil was in his first managerial role. Ruth came to Frederick after having played briefly in the 1922 season, appearing in four games with the Reading Aces. His 1922 season was shortened while battling alcoholism.

Playing the season under Norm McNeil, Frederick placed fourth in the Blue Ridge League standings. The Hustlers finished with a final record of 52–45. The Hustlers ended the season 24½ games behind the first place Martinsburg Blue Sox in the final standings. No Blue Ridge League playoffs were held in 1923.

Player/manager Norm McNeil appeared in 67 games at catcher for the Hustlers and batted .330 with 3 home runs. McNeil became the manager of the Johnstown Johnnies in 1925 and 1926 after playing briefly with the Toronto Maple Leafs in 1924 following his season with Frederick.

First baseman Jim Keesey batted .366 with 20 home runs in 95 games. Keesey later played briefly for the Philadelphia Athletics in the 1925 and 1930 seasons, playing 16 total games and batting .294.

A Frederick native, Ray Gardner played his third of four seasons with his hometown team. Playing shortstop, Gardner batted .348 with 22 doubles, 6 triples and 10 home runs in 95 games for the Hustlers at age 21. Gardner played in the major leagues with the Cleveland Indians in (1929 and 1930, batting .253 with 1 home run in 115 games.

The Frederick Hustlers had a new home venue, as the moved into a new ballpark for the 1924 Blue Ridge League season. McCurdy Field was built for the team, named for Dr. Ira McCurdy, who was an ownership partner of the Hustlers. The ballpark was constructed for $15,000. The ballpark hosted its first game on May 13, 1924. The Hustlers lost to Hanover with 3,000 fans in attendance for the opening game. The playing field dimensions were enormous when the ballpark opened: 600 feet to center field and 506 feet to right field.

For the 1924 season, speedy outfielder Chick Fullis was signed by the Hustlers to play his first professional minor league season at age 20. Fullis had graduated from Girardville High School in Pennsylvania and worked in the coal mines and on town teams around Girardville after high school. In 1923, Fullis had played with the semi-pro Shenandoah Braves in the Pennsylvania Anthracite League and batted close to .400. It was there he was seen by Frederick scouts and signed to the team for the 1924 season. Fullis was batting near .450 into late June for the Hustlers, before he suddenly left the team unexpectedly in July and returned home. He rejoined the team on July 22 after correcting his birth year and getting married. He then was sent home with permission by the team in August.

In 1924 Herb Armstrong became the Hustlers manager, at Frederick continued play in the six-team Blue Ridge League. Joining Frederick at age 31, Armstrong had been a player/manager for the Cambridge Canners of the Eastern Shore League the prior two seasons. the unaffiliated Frederick Hustlers finished in fifth place in the six-team Blue Ridge League. The Hustlers ended the season with a record of 44–56 to place fifth, playing the season under manager Herb Armstrong finishing 16½ games behind the champion Martinsburg Blue Sox.

Frederick Centerfielder Chick Fullis batted .353 with 6 home runs in 60 games in 1924, playing his first professional season at age 20.

First baseman Karl Kolseth batted .343 with 10 triples and 10 home runs in 67 games at age 31. Kolseth had played briefly with the 1015 Baltimore Terrapins in the Federal League.

Success as Buck Ramsey returned as manager in 1925. Frederick Hustlers finished the 1925 season in the league finals, as the league adopted a playoff system. with a record of 56–40 to place second in the six–team Blue Ridge League. Under returning manager Buck Ramsey finished 7.0 games behind the first place Hagerstown Hubs in the final standings. In his second season with the Hustlers at age 24, Henry Sherry had a 20-7 record. Sherry led the league with his 20 victories. at age 49, Buck Ramsey had a 1–2 record as a pitcher, closed his pitching career with a 35–18 record in his four seasons with the Frederick Hustlers.

Standing at 5'8" (173 cm), shortstop Roy Gardner returned to his hometown team and batted .299 with 23 doubles and 5 home runs in 101 games for the Hustlers. He would spend the next three seasons with the New Orleans Pelicans of the Southern Association before making his major league debut.

18-year-old catcher Rollie Hemsley made his professional debut with Frederick in 1925, his first of three seasons with the team. The future major league All-star batted .242 with 1 home run in 47 games.

Chick Fullis played a second full season with Frederick and batted .328 with 6 home runs and 13 triples in 95 games. Before the season, Fullis had been sold by the Hustlers to the Portsmouth Truckers of the Class B level Virginia League. He refused to report to Portsmouth and demanded a higher salary. In April 1925, Portsmouth returned the unsigned Fullis to Frederick for the season. After his successful 1925 season after returning Frederick, he was sold to Columbus Senators of the American Association for $4,000, but he refused to report to Columbs. He then was sold by Frederick to the Macon Peaches and reported to Macon.

=== 1926 to 1928: Blue Ridge League ===
Veteran minor league player and manager Barney Cleveland became the Frederick manager in 1926 at age 35. Before joining Frederick, Cleveland spent the 1925 season as a player with the Norfolk Tars of the Class B level Virginia League, batting .310 with 2 home runs in 135 games. Cleveland's nickname was "Red."

Frederick Hustlers in continued Blue Ridge League play in 1926 and the Hustlers finished second in the league's overall standings, advancing to the league playoff final. With a regular season record of 54–41, Frederick placed second, finishing 10.0 games behind the first place Hagerstown Hubs. The team was managed by Barney Cleveland. In the playoff Hagerstown defeated Frederick 3 games to 1 and claimed the league championship.

In his third season with the Hustlers at age 25, Henry Sherry had a 7-8 record on the heels of his 20-win season. Frederick outfielder Chick Fullis led the Blue Ridge League with 80 runs scored. John M. Smith of Frederick led the league with 126 total hits. Player/manager Barney Cleveland played in 59 games at third base and batted .305 with 1 home run in his dual role.

Playing his second season with Frederick, catcher Rollie Hemsley, the future major league All-star batted .256 with 2 home runs in 46 games.

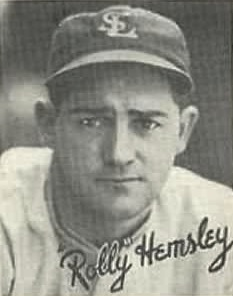
(1936) Rollie Hemsley, St. Louis Browns. A five-time major league All-star as a catcher, Hemsley played three seasons with the Hustlers, batting .310 in 1927 before embarking on a 19-season major league career beginning in 1928.

Chick Fullis played 88 games in his third season with Frederick and batted .364 with 9 home runs. He began the season with the Macon Peaches of the Class B level South Atlantic League, where he played 23 games before being returned to Frederick for a third season with the Hustlers. Fullis was sent back to Frederick by Macon on May 18, 1926. Fullis advanced to the major leagues in 1928. In his major league career, he played with the New York Giants (1928–1932), Philadelphia Phillies (1933–1934) and St. Louis Cardinals (1934, 1936). Fullis played with the 1934 World Series Champion Philadelphia Phillies team. In his career, Fullis batted .295 with 12 career home runs in 590 games. His baseball career was shortened by frequent injuries. Fullis had purchased a bar and a hotel in Girardville, Pennsylvania during his playing career. He managed the properties before he died of kidney failure at age 45.

Coming off his strong pitching performances with the team, Henry Sherry became the Fredrick player/manager in 1927 at age 26. Barney Cleveland left Frederick and became the manager of the Durham Bulls of the Class C level Piedmont League.

The 1927 Blue Ridge League played a split season schedule for the first time as Vincent Jameson continued his lengthy tenure as league president. Frederick Hustlers finished the season with a record of 53–47. The Hustlers placed third in the Blue Ridge League, playing under manager Harry Sherry Frederick ended the season 12½ games behind the first place Chambersburg Maroons in the final overall standings. The Hustlers didn't advance to the playoff as Chambersburg won the first half title and Martinsburg won the second half pennant. The final series was won by Chambersburg over Martinsburg 2 games to 0.

Catcher Rollie Hemsley played his third and final season with the Hustlers. At age 20, the future major league All-star batted .310 with 12 home runs and 22 doubles and 9 triples in 98 games for Frederick in 1927. He made his major league debut the next season. Advancing to the major leagues, Hemsley was a five time All-Star (1935, 1936, 1939, 1940, 1944), and had a long major league career. After his three seasons with Frederick, he played in the major leagues for the Pittsburgh Pirates (1928–1931), Chicago Cubs (1931–1932), Cincinnati Reds (1933), St. Louis Browns (1933–1937), Cleveland Indians (1938–1941), Cincinnati Reds (1942), New York Yankees (1942–1944) and Philadelphia Phillies (1946–1947). Hemsley did not play in the 1945 season due to military service. He batted .262 with 31 home runs in his 19 major league seasons and 1,593 games. Hemsley was the catcher of a no hitter by Hall of Fame pitcher Bob Feller on opening day in 1940, driving in the only run of the game with a triple. Throughout his career, he had battled alcohol addiction, before announcing in 1940 that he had quit drinking and was a member of Alcoholics Anonymous. His public announcement gave the organization a rise in membership and popularity.

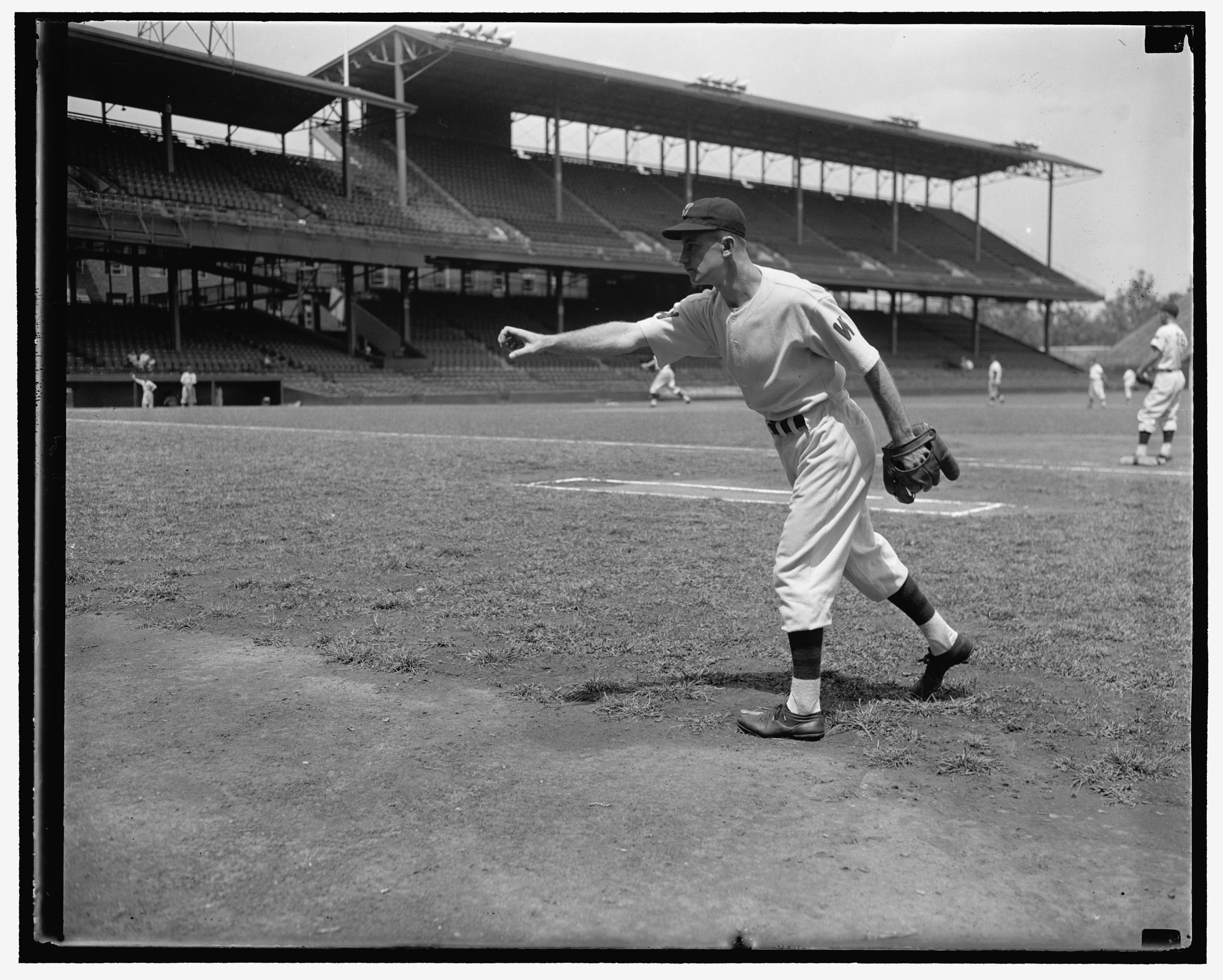
(1937) Jimmie DeShong, Washington Senators. DeShong pitched for Frederick in 1928 at age 18, his first professional season.

The Blue Ridge League continued play wit the Frederick Hustlers as a member of the six-team league in 1928. The Class D level league again played a split season schedule, finished third in the Blue Ridge League overall standings. Frederick ended the first half in fourth place with a 24–24 record. The Hustlers place third and in the second half with a 23–25 record. The Hustlers ended the regular season with an ovealll record of 47–49 to place third in the six–team league overall standings. Managed by Harry Sherry and Joe Neptune, the Hustlers finished 11½ games behind the first place Hanover Raiders in the final standings. First half winner Hanover defeated the second half winner Chambersburg in the final 4 games to 2. Beginning in 1928, the Blue Ridge League champion was matched in a championship series with the champion of the Middle Atlantic League in the "Tri-State Series." The Frederick Hustlers did not advance to play in this series.

Jimmie DeShong pitched for the 1928 Hustlers at age 18 and had a 2–3 record in 12 games. It was the first professional season for the Harrisburg, Pennsylvania native. He advanced to the major leagues and pitched for the Philadelphia Athletics (1932), New York Yankees (1934–1935) and Washington Senators (1936–1939), compiling a 47–44 with 9 saves and a 5.07 ERA in 175 career games.

=== 1929 & 1930: Cleveland affiliate Frederick Warriors ===
The 1929 Frederick team became a minor league affiliate for the first time and became known by a new nickname. With the franchise becoming a minor league affiliate of the Cleveland Indians, the Frederick team became known as the "Warriors" while becoming Cleveland's first documented affiliate farm team. Frederick continued play as a member of the six-team Class D level Blue Ridge League for its tenth consecutive season of play.

At age 41, veteran minor league catcher Robert Wells became the Frederick player/manager, having served in the same role with the Springfield Midgets of the Class C level Western Association the season prior. The 1929 season was Wells' fifth in serving as a minor league player/manager.

As a new minor league affiliate, the Frederick Warriors placed second in the Blue Ridge League final regular season standings. The league played a split season schedule. The Frederick Hustlers finished the regular season with a record of 63–53 to finish as the runner up in the six–team league overall standings.Under manager Bob Wells, the Warriors finished the season 6.0 games behind the first place Martinsburg Blue Sox in the final standings. Despite their second place overall finish, Frederick did not qualify for the playoff in the split season. Frederick finished the first half in second place with a 35–23 record and third and in the second half with a 28–30 record. The league title was won by the third place overall and first half winner Hagerstown Hubs. Hagerstown won the finals over the second half winner Martinsburg 4 games to 2.

Frederick Warriors outfielder Joe Vosmik led the Blue Ridge League with 155 total hits, while Warriors pitcher Alfred Biot had a league best 13-3 record. Frederick player/manager Bob Wells played sparingly and batted .318 while appearing in 10 games with 22 total at-bats.

Frederick Warriors pitcher Bill King played his 11th and final professional season pitching for his hometown team. He had a 5-3 record at age 36. He won 134 total games in his 11-season tenure with Frederick. King died in his hometown in 1977 and is buried at Mount Olivet Cemetery in Frederick.

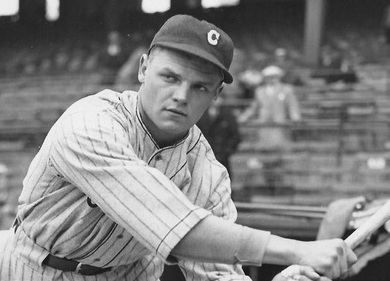
(1931) Joe Vosmik, Cleveland Indians. Vosmik batted .385 with 39 doubles and 24 triples for Frederick in 1929. He played 13 major league seasons, batting .307 for his career.

Playing his first professional season at age 19, Joe Vosmik batted .385 with 39 doubles, 24 triples and 9 home runs in 112 games for the Warriors. Vosmik joined Frederick after being discovered while playing for the Rotbart Jewelers team in a municipal league in Cleveland, Ohio. He was discovered by the Cleveland Indians manager Roger Peckinpaugh in 1928, signed with the Indians and was assigned to begin his career with Frederick, receiving a $300 bonus upon signing. As a youth had earlier been turned down by the Cleveland Indians after applying to be an usher or vendor for the Indians home games. Cleveland Baseball Hall of Fame player Tris Speaker worked with Vosmik on his fielding and he made great improvements. After playing for the Class B level Terre Haute Tots in 1930, Vosmik made his major league debut with Cleveland in 1931. Becoming a major league All-star, Vosmik played 13 seasons in the major leagues with a lifetime batting average of .307 and 874 RBIs, with a .369 OBP and .807 OPS. He played for the Cleveland Indians (1930–1936), St. Louis Browns (1937), Boston Red Sox (1938–1939), Brooklyn Dodgers (1940–1941) and Washington Senators (1944). Vosmik batted .320 with 117 RBIs as a rookie in 1931. In 1938, he had 201 total hits to lead the majors. Following his major league playing career, he was a minor league manager for five seasons from 1947 to 1951.

The Blue Ridge League compacted to four teams in 1930, which proved to be the final season of play for the long running Frederick Blue Ridge franchise. The Hanover Raiders and Martinsburg Blue Sox teams did not return to the league. The Warriors were again an affiliate of the Cleveland Indians and finished the 1930 season in last place. The Frederick Warriors finished the regular season with an overall record of 50–62 to place fourth in the standings under manager Bob Wells. The Warriors ended the regular season 18½ games behind the first place Chambersburg Young Yanks. As a Cleveland Indians affiliate, Frederick was the only league team with a major league affiliate in 1930. As two league teams tied for the first half title, they met in the playoffs. Waynesboro lost to Chambersburg in the Blue Ridge League playoff 2 games to 1.

Warriors pitcher William Perrin led the league with 117 strikeouts. Player/manager Bob Wells again played very little but batted .467 while appearing in 7 games with 15 at-bats.

The Blue Ridge League folded following the 1930 season, greatly affected by the stock market crash of 1929. On February 10, 1931, it was announced in the Frederick Post that the league had folded. League President J. V. Jamison of Hagerstown sent a letter to the presidents of the Frederick, Hagerstown, Waynesboro and Chambersburg clubs, announcing the demise of the league due to the inability to interest major league baseball teams in the Blue Ridge League. Major League baseball had supported the league the prior two seasons. Jamison recommended that the circuit disband with the hope that support could be garnered to reform the league for the 1932 season. The league did not reform.

Frederick was without minor league baseball for the next 59 years. In 1989, the Frederick Keys were formed and began a long tenure as members of the Class A level Carolina League.

Today, the Frederick "Hustlers" nickname has been revived by a local youth baseball organization that was founded in 2001.

== The ballparks ==
Beginning with their first professional season in 1915, the Frederick Husters minor league teams hosted their home games at Agricultural Park, which was located within the Frederick Fairgrounds. The ballpark was located on the East side of the fairgrounds. Frederick hosted home games at the ballpark through the 1923 season. The Agricultural Park left field fence consisted of cow barn structures and chicken wire for the fenceline. There was no outfield fence in right field. As the ballfield was situated in the fairgrounds, animal pens were located on two sides of the park, and a half-mile racetrack also bordered the ballpark.

Today, the Agricultural Park site is still home to the fairgrounds. The 40-acre Frederick Fairgrounds are located at 797 East Patrick Street in Frederick, Maryland. The annual Great Frederick Fair has been hosted at the fairgrounds since 1822.

On August 31, 1915, the Philadelphia Athletics played an exhibition game at Agricultural Park against the Blue Ridge League champion Frederick Hustlers after the 1915 season had concluded. Philadelphia won the game 6-3, as Baseball Hall of Fame member Nap Lajoie had 3 RBIs for Philadelphia at the ballpark .

Beginning in 1924, Frederick hosted home games at the newly built McCurdy Field. The ballpark opened on May 13, 1924, and was first known as "Frederick County Athletic Field." The ballpark was constructed for a total cost of $15,000. When the ballpark fist opened, the grandstands and bleachers held 2,500. In the era, the ballpark had field had dimensions of 348 feet to left field, with a huge distances of 506 feet to right field, and 600 feet to center field. The Frederick Blue Ridge League teams played at the McCurdy Field ballpark through the 1930 season when the Blue Ridge League folded.

In 1937, the newly formed Washington Redskins football team played an exhibition game at the ballpark. It was the first Washington-area game for the team, following their move to Washington D.C. from Boston. In the game, Washington beat a local American Legion All-Star team 50-0 with 1,000 fans in attendance.

The Philadelphia Athletics hosted their spring training at McCurdy Field in 1944 and 1945.

Later, the ballpark hosted the 1989 Frederick Keys in their first season of Carolina League play.

Today, McCurdy Field is still in use for baseball. It is located between Jefferson Street and Burick Street in Frederick, Maryland.

== Timeline ==
Year(s)	# Yrs.	Team	Level	League	Affiliate	Ballpark
1915	1	Frederick Hustlers	Class D	Blue Ridge League	None	Frederick Fairgrounds
1916	1	Frederick Champs	Class D	Blue Ridge League	None	Frederick Fairgrounds
1917	1	Frederick Hustlers	Class D	Blue Ridge League	None	Frederick Fairgrounds
1920–1923	4	Frederick Hustlers	Class D	Blue Ridge League	None	Frederick Fairgrounds
1924–1928	5	Frederick Hustlers	Class D	Blue Ridge League	None	McCurdy Field
1929–1930	2	Frederick Warriors	Class D	Blue Ridge League	Cleveland Indians	McCurdy Field

== Year–by–year records ==
Year	Record	Finish	Manager	Playoffs/Notes
1915	53–23	1st	Jack Morrison	No playoffs held League champions
1916	46–51	5th	Jack Morrison	No playoffs held
1917	44–55	5th	Tom Crooke	No playoffs held
1920	53–40	2nd	Buck Ramsey	No playoffs held
1921	58–38	1st	Buck Ramsey	No playoffs held League champions
1922	54–44	3rd	Buck Ramsey	No playoffs held
1923	41–53	4th	Norm McNeil	No playoffs held
1924	44–56	5th	Herb Armstrong	No playoffs held
1925	56–40	2nd	Buck Ramsey	No playoffs held
1926	54–41	2nd	Barney Cleveland	Lost League Finals
1927	53–47	3rd	Henry Sherry	Did not qualify
1928	47–49	3rd	Henry Sherry / Joe Neptune	Did not qualify
1929	63–53	2nd	Bob Wells	Did not qualify
1930	50–62	4th	Bob Wells	Did not qualify

== Notable alumni ==
- Clyde Barnhart (1915–1917)
- Clarence Blethen (1920–1923)
- Larry Boerner (1926)
- Tim Connolly (1915)
- Tom Crooke (1917)
- Jimmie DeShong (1928)
- Chick Fullis (1924–1926)
- Milt Galatzer (1930)
- Ray Gardner (1920, 1922–1923, 1925)
- Ray Hartranft (1920)
- Rollie Hemsley (1925–1927) 5x MLB All-star
- Bill Hohman (1924)
- Jim Keesey (1923)
- Karl Kolseth (1924)
- Bill Lamar (1915)
- Lew Malone (1915)
- Norm McNeil (1923, MGR)
- Leo Meyer (1916)
- Dick Nallin (1909)
- Bill Perrin (1930)
- Bobby Schang (1923)
- Duke Sedgwick (1922)
- Buck Stanley (1917)
- Jim Stevens (1921–1923)
- Joe Vosmik (1929) MLB All-star

== See also ==
- Frederick Hustlers players
- Frederick Champs players
- Frederick Warriors players
- List of Cleveland Guardians minor league affiliates
- Sportspeople from Frederick, Maryland
