= Frederick Keys =

- Founded in 1989; Frederick, Maryland
Team logo
Cap insignia

Minor league affiliations
- Class: High-A (2026–present)
- Previous classes: Collegiate summer (2021–2025); Class A-Advanced (1989–2020)
- League: South Atlantic League (2026–present)
- Previous leagues: MLB Draft League (2021–2025); Carolina League (1989–2020)

Major league affiliations
- Team: Baltimore Orioles (1989–2020; 2026–present)
- Previous teams: Unaffiliated (2021–2025)

Minor league titles
- League titles (4): 1990; 2005; 2007; 2011
- Division titles (5): 1990; 2005; 2006; 2007; 2011
- First-half titles (1): 2026
- Second-half titles (1): 2026

Team data
- Name: Frederick Keys (1989–present)
- Colors: Black, orange, yellow, white
- Mascot: Keyote
- Ballpark: Nymeo Field at Harry Grove Stadium (1990–present)
- Previous parks: McCurdy Field (1989)
- Owner/ Operator: Attain Sports and Entertainment
- General manager: Branden McGee
- Manager: Collin Woody
- Website: milb.com/frederick

The Frederick Keys are a Minor League Baseball (MiLB) team located in Frederick, Maryland. They are the High-A affiliate of the Baltimore Orioles and play in the South Atlantic League. Home games are played at Nymeo Field at Harry Grove Stadium. Prior to Major League Baseball's reorganization of the minor leagues following the 2020 season, the Keys served as the Class A-Advanced affiliate of the Orioles from 1989 to 2020. After the reorganization, the Keys joined the MLB Draft League. On August 1, 2025, the team announced that it would serve as the High-A affiliate of the Baltimore Orioles starting in 2026. The former High-A affiliate, the Aberdeen IronBirds, moved to the Draft League, where they replaced the Keys formerly occupied spot.

The team and one of its mascots, Frank Key, are named after lawyer and Frederick County native Francis Scott Key, the author of the poem "Defence of Fort M'Henry", the first stanza of which, set to the tune of "The Anacreontic Song", became "The Star-Spangled Banner", the American national anthem.

== History ==
=== Early professional baseball in Frederick ===
Frederick was one of the founding members of the Blue Ridge League, which existed from 1915 to 1930. The team, which went by the names of Hustlers, Champs and Warriors, won league championships in 1915 and 1921. Games were played at the Frederick Fairgrounds until 1924 when McCurdy Field was built. With the collapse of the Blue Ridge League in 1931, it would be several decades before professional baseball returned to Frederick.

Frederick players from this era who were major leaguers:

- Clyde Barnhart: 1915, 1916, 1917
- Tom Connolly: 1915
- Bill Lamar: 1915
- Leo Meyer: 1916
- Tom Crooke: 1917
- Clarence Blethen: 1920, 1921, 1922, 1923
- Ray Gardner: 1920, 1922, 1923, 1925
- Ray Hartranft: 1920
- Duke Sedgwick: 1922
- Jim Keesey: 1923
- Norm McNeil: 1923
- Bobby Schang: 1923
- Chick Fullis: 1924, 1925, 1926
- Karl Kolseth: 1924
- Bill Hohman: 1924
- Rollie Hemsley: 1925, 1926, 1927
- Larry Boerner:1926
- Jimmie DeShong:1928
- Joe Vosmik: 1929
- Milt Galatzer: 1930
- Bill Perrin: 1930

=== Modern team ===
The team was founded in 1989 when the Baltimore Orioles decided to move their Class A Carolina League affiliate from Hagerstown, Maryland. The city of Frederick convinced the owners of the then-Hagerstown Suns to move the team to Frederick and promised a 4,000-seat stadium to be built for the 1990 season. For the 1989 season, the Keys played at McCurdy Field, a Babe Ruth League stadium, while waiting for the construction of the new stadium to be completed. The Keys opened by losing both ends of a doubleheader (including a seven-inning perfect game by Dennis Burlingame) against the Durham Bulls. Their first win came on April 11, 1989, with a 3–1 victory over the Kinston Indians in the Keys' first-ever home game.

Only two players in Keys history have been transferred directly from Frederick to the Baltimore Orioles (excluding rehab related transfers). On September 3, 1996, Eugene Kingsale's contract was purchased by the Orioles. On June 11, 2005, Jeff Fiorentino's contract was purchased by the Orioles in order to replace the injured Luis Matos.

The 2020 Minor League Baseball season was cancelled due to the COVID-19 pandemic. The Keys did not receive an invitation to remain in affiliated baseball as part of the 2021 reorganization of Minor League Baseball, and instead joined the newly-formed MLB Draft League.

The Keys were purchased from Maryland Baseball Holding, LLC by Attain Sports and Entertainment in January 2022.

In August 2025, Attain announced their intent to switch the positions of the Keys and the Aberdeen IronBirds, the High-A affiliate of the Orioles based in Aberdeen, Maryland, which Attain also own. As such, for the 2026 season, the Keys will join the High-A South Atlantic League as affiliates of the Orioles, while the IronBirds will join the MLB Draft League.

== Playoff history ==
=== Carolina League ===
- 1990: Defeated Kinston 3–2 to win championship.
- 1993: Lost to Wilmington 2–0 in semifinals.
- 1997: Lost to Lynchburg 2–0 in semifinals.
- 2000: Lost to Lynchburg 2–0 in semifinals.
- 2001: Lost to Wilmington 2–0 in semifinals.
- 2005: Defeated Lynchburg 2–0 in semifinals; defeated Kinston 3–2 to win championship.
- 2006: Defeated Wilmington 2–1 in semifinals; lost to Kinston 3–0 in finals.
- 2007: Defeated Wilmington 2–0 in semifinals; defeated Salem 3–1 to win championship.
- 2010: Lost to Potomac 3–1 in semifinals.
- 2011: Defeated Potomac 3–2 in semifinals; defeated Kinston 3–1 to win championship.
- 2017: Lost to Lynchburg 2–1 in semifinals.

== Notable former Keys ==
Several Keys alumni have gone on to play in the major leagues. In their inaugural season, the opening day roster featured several future major leaguers: David Segui, Francisco de la Rosa, Luis Mercedes, Jack Voigt, and Pete Rose Jr.

Other Keys alumni include:

- Andy Van Slyke: 1995
- Arthur Rhodes: 1989, 1990
- Joe Borowski: 1989, 1990
- Rocky Coppinger: 1995
- Sidney Ponson: 1996
- Brian Roberts: 2000
- Larry Bigbie: 2000
- Tim Raines Jr.: 2000
- Eli Whiteside: 2002
- Nick Markakis: 2005
- Adam Loewen: 2005
- Nolan Reimold: 2006
- Matt Wieters: 2008
- Brad Bergesen: 2009
- Manny Machado: 2011
- Dylan Bundy: 2012
- Nicky Delmonico: 2012
- Ty Kelly: 2012
- Jason Hammel: 2012
- Kevin Gausman: 2012
- Steve Pearce: 2013
- Josh Stinson: 2013
- Ashur Tolliver: 2013
- Wilson Betemit: 2013
- Ryan Flaherty: 2013
- Zach Davies: 2013
- Mike Yastrzemski: 2014
- Jimmy Yacabonis: 2014
- Austin Wynns: 2014
- Trey Mancini: 2014
- Parker Bridwell: 2014
- Steven Brault: 2014
- Mychal Givens: 2014
- Chance Sisco: 2015
- Jonathan Schoop: 2015
- John Means: 2015
- Stefan Crichton: 2015
- Wei-Yin Chen: 2015
- David Lough: 2015
- David Hess: 2015
- Ryan Mountcastle: 2017

== Roster ==
Frederick Keys roster
Players		Coaches/Other
Pitchers: 26 Cohen Achen; 50 Boston Bateman; 54 Jack Crowder; 18 Carson Dorsey; 40 Raimon Gomez; 65 Todd Kniebbe; 47 Harrison Kreiling; 60 Zac Lampton; 19 Kiefer Lord; 44 Chandler Marsh; 13 Twine Palmer; 34 Brendan Parks; 27 Christian Rodriguez; 48 Teddy Sharkey; 51 Isaac Silva; 32 Braeden Sloan; 31 Stephen Still; 43 Trent Turzenski; 30 Kyson Witherspoon; 53 Ben Vespi; 14 Evan Yates	Catchers: 23 Yasmil Bucce; 64 Andrés Nolaya; 10 Ryan Stafford; Infielders: 38 Leandro Arias; 15 Randal Diaz; 28 DJ Layton; 1 Jaiden Lo Re; 16 Colin Yeaman; Outfielders: 58 Félix Amparo; 35 Enddy Azócar; 46 Elis Cuevas; 7 Ty Head; -- Ike Irish; 11 Jordan Sanchez; 39 Braylin Tavera; 45 Braylon Whitaker	Manager: 21 Collin Woody; Coaches: 36 Jordie Henry (pitching); 17 Teegan Leader (development); -- Jake Ratz (hitting); 26 Chase Sebby (fundamentals); 60-day injured list: -- Chase Allsup (full season); -- RJ Austin; -- Yeiber Cartaya; -- Nate George; -- Hayden Nierman (full season); -- Grabiel Salazar (full season); -- Luis Sánchez (full season); -- Tanner Smith; 7-day injured list; * On Baltimore Orioles 40-man roster; ~ Development list; # Rehab assignment; ∞ Reserve list; ‡ Restricted list; § Suspended list; † Temporarily inactive list; Roster updated October 1, 2026; Transactions; → More rosters: MiLB • South Atlantic League; → Baltimore Orioles minor league players

== See also ==
- Sports in Maryland
