= List of Cleveland Guardians minor league affiliates =

Current Cleveland Guardians northeastern minor league affiliate locations

The Cleveland Guardians farm system consists of seven Minor League Baseball affiliates across the United States and in the Dominican Republic. Four teams are independently owned, while three—the Arizona Complex League Guardians and two Dominican Summer League Guardians squads—are owned by the major league club.

The Guardians, named the Indians until November 2021, have been affiliated with the Double-A Canton–Akron Indians/Akron Aeros/RubberDucks of the Eastern League since 1989, making it the longest-running affiliation in the organization among teams not owned by the Guardians. Their newest affiliate is the Hill City Howlers of the Carolina League, which became the Guardians' Class A-Advanced club in 2015, and were reassigned to Single-A in 2021.

Geographically, Cleveland's closest domestic affiliate is the Lake County Captains of the High-A Midwest League, which are approximately 16 miles (26 km) away. Cleveland's furthest domestic affiliate is the Arizona Complex League Guardians of the Rookie League Arizona Complex League some 1,763 miles (2,837 km) away.

== Current affiliates ==
The Cleveland Guardians farm system consists of seven minor league affiliates.

Class	Team	League	Location	Ballpark	Affiliated
Triple-A	Columbus Clippers	International League	Columbus, Ohio	Huntington Park	2009
Double-A	Akron RubberDucks	Eastern League	Akron, Ohio	7 17 Credit Union Park	1989
High-A	Lake County Captains	Midwest League	Eastlake, Ohio	Classic Park	1991
Single-A	Hill City Howlers	Carolina League	Lynchburg, Virginia	Bank of the James Stadium	2015
Rookie	ACL Guardians	Arizona Complex League	Goodyear, Arizona	Goodyear Ballpark	2021
Rookie	DSL Guardians Goryl	Dominican Summer League	Boca Chica, Santo Domingo	Academia de Prospecto Complex	2021
Rookie	DSL Guardians Mendoza	Dominican Summer League	Boca Chica, Santo Domingo	Academia de Prospecto Complex	2021

== Past affiliates ==
=== Key ===
Season	Each year is linked to an article about that particular Guardians/Indians season.

=== 1929–1962 ===
Minor League Baseball operated with five classes (Double-A, Class A, Class B, Class C, and Class D) from 1929 to 1935. Class A1, between Double-A and Class A, was added in 1936. The minors continued to operate with these six levels through 1945. Triple-A was established as the highest classification in 1946, and Class A1 became Double-A, with Class A through D remaining. These six levels continued through 1962. The Pacific Coast League (PCL) was reclassified from Triple-A to Open in 1952 due to the possibility of becoming a third major league. This arrangement ended following the 1957 season when the relocation of the National League's Dodgers and Giants to the West Coast ended any chance of the PCL being promoted.

Season	Triple-A	Double-A	Class A	Class B	Class C	Class D	Ref.
1929	—	—	—	—	—	Frederick Warriors	
1930	—	—	—	—	—	Frederick Warriors	
1931	—	—	—	—	—	—	
1932	—	—	—	Fort Wayne Chiefs; Quincy Indians; Williamsport Grays	—	Burlington Bees	
1933	—	—	New Orleans Pelicans	—	Zanesville Greys	—	
1934	—	—	New Orleans Pelicans	—	Zanesville Greys	Fargo-Moorhead Twins; Monessen Indians	
1935	—	Minneapolis Millers	New Orleans Pelicans	—	Zanesville Greys	Butler Indians; Fargo-Moorhead Twins; Opelousas Indians	
1936	—	Minneapolis Millers	New Orleans Pelicans (A1)	—	Clarksdale Ginners; Zanesville Greys	Fargo-Moorhead Twins; Mansfield Tigers; Monessen Indians; Opelousas Indians; Wausau Timberjacks	
1937	—	Milwaukee Brewers	New Orleans Pelicans (A1)	Montgomery Bombers	Oswego Netherlands; Springfield Indians	Fargo-Moorhead Twins; Hopkinsville Hoppers; Newton-Conover Twins; Opelousas Indians; Owensboro Oilers; Wausau Timberjacks	
1938	—	Milwaukee Brewers	New Orleans Pelicans (A1)	Bloomington Bloomers	Oswego Netherlands; Springfield Indians	Fargo-Moorhead Twins; Gainesville G-Men; Hopkinsville Hoppers; Owensboro Oilers	
1939	—	Buffalo Bisons	New Orleans Pelicans (A1); Wilkes-Barre Barons	Cedar Rapids Raiders; Spartanburg Spartans; Winston-Salem Twins	Springfield Indians; Tyler Trojans	Fargo-Moorhead Twins; Greeneville Burley Cubs; Leaksville-Draper-Spray Triplets; Logan Indians; Mansfield Braves; Niagara Falls Rainbows; Opelousas Indians; Tallahassee Capitals; Troy Trojans	
1940	—	—	Wilkes-Barre Barons	Cedar Rapids Raiders	Charleston Senators; El Paso Texans; Flint Gems	Fargo-Moorhead Twins; Mansfield Braves; Salem-Roanoke Friends; Thomasville Tommies; Warren Redskins	
1941	—	—	Oklahoma City Indians (A1); Wilkes-Barre Barons	Cedar Rapids Raiders	Charleston Senators; Flint Arrows; Salina Millers	Appleton Papermakers; Mansfield Braves; Thomasville Tommies	
1942	—	Baltimore Orioles	Wilkes-Barre Barons	Cedar Rapids Raiders	Charleston Senators; Wausau Timberjacks	Appleton Papermakers; Batavia Clippers; Thomasville Tommies	
1943	—	Baltimore Orioles	Wilkes-Barre Barons	—	—	Batavia Clippers	
1944	—	Baltimore Orioles	Wilkes-Barre Barons	—	—	Batavia Clippers	
1945	—	Baltimore Orioles	Wilkes-Barre Barons	—	—	Batavia Clippers	
1946	Baltimore Orioles	Oklahoma City Indians	Wilkes-Barre Barons	Harrisburg Senators	Bakersfield Indians; Clovis Pioneers; Pittsfield Electrics	Appleton Papermakers; Batavia Clippers; Centreville Orioles; Dayton Indians	
1947	Baltimore Orioles	Oklahoma City Indians	Wilkes-Barre Barons	Harrisburg Senators; Spartanburg Peaches	Bakersfield Indians; Burlington Indians; Jacksonville Jax; Pittsfield Electrics; Tucson Cowboys	Ardmore Indians; Batavia Clippers; Cordele Indians; Dayton Indians; Green Bay Bluejays; Union City Greyhounds	
1948	Baltimore Orioles	Oklahoma City Indians	Dayton Indians; Wilkes-Barre Indians	Harrisburg Senators; Meridian Peps; Spartanburg Peaches	Bakersfield Indians; Burlington Indians; Pittsfield Electrics; Tucson Cowboys	Ardmore Indians; Batavia Clippers; Bloomingdale Troopers; Cordele Indians; Green Bay Bluejays; Mattoon Indians; Union City Greyhounds	
1949	San Diego Padres	Oklahoma City Indians	Dayton Indians; Wilkes-Barre Indians	Harrisburg Senators; Spartanburg Peaches; St. Petersburg Saints	Bakersfield Indians; Burlington Indians; Pittsfield Indians; Tucson Cowboys	Batavia Clippers; Cordele Indians; Green Bay Bluejays; Iola Indians; Stroudsburg Poconos; Union City Greyhounds; Zanesville Indians	
1950	San Diego Padres	Oklahoma City Indians	Dayton Indians; Wilkes-Barre Indians	Cedar Rapids Indians; Harrisburg Senators; Spartanburg Peaches; Tacoma Tigers	Bakersfield Indians; Pittsfield Indians; Tucson Cowboys	Batavia Clippers; Green Bay Bluejays; Daytona Beach Islanders; Zanesville Indians	
1951	San Diego Padres	Dallas Eagles	Dayton Indians; Wichita Indians; Wilkes-Barre Indians	Cedar Rapids Indians; Harrisburg Senators; Spartanburg Peaches	Bakersfield Indians; Fort Smith Indians	Batavia Clippers; Daytona Beach Islanders; Green Bay Bluejays	
1952	Indianapolis Indians	Dallas Eagles	Reading Indians; Wichita Indians	Cedar Rapids Indians; Spartanburg Peaches	Bakersfield Indians; Fort Smith Indians	Daytona Beach Islanders; Green Bay Bluejays	
1953	Indianapolis Indians	—	Reading Indians	Peoria Chiefs; Spartanburg Peaches	Fargo-Moorhead Twins; Sherbrooke Indians	Daytona Beach Islanders; Green Bay Bluejays	
1954	Indianapolis Indians	—	Reading Indians	Keokuk Kernels; Spartanburg Peaches	Fargo-Moorhead Twins; Sherbrooke Indians	Jacksonville Beach Sea Birds; Tifton Indians	
1955	Indianapolis Indians	Tulsa Oilers	Reading Indians	Keokuk Kernels; Spartanburg Peaches	Fargo-Moorhead Twins; Sherbrooke Indians	Lafayette Chiefs; Vidalia Indians	
1956	Indianapolis Indians; San Diego Padres (Open)	Mobile Bears	Reading Indians	Fayetteville Highlanders; Keokuk Kernels	Fargo-Moorhead Twins	Daytona Beach Islanders; North Platte Indians; Vidalia Indians	
1957	San Diego Padres (Open)	Mobile Bears	Reading Indians	Keokuk Kernels	Fargo-Moorhead Twins	Batavia Indians; Cocoa Indians; North Platte Indians	
1958	San Diego Padres	Mobile Bears	Reading Indians	Burlington Indians	Minot Mallards	Batavia Indians; Cocoa Indians; North Platte Indians	
1959	San Diego Padres	Mobile Bears	Reading Indians	Burlington Indians	Minot Mallards	Batavia Indians; North Platte Indians; Selma Cloverleafs	
1960	Toronto Maple Leafs	Mobile Bears	Reading Indians	Burlington Indians	Minot Mallards	Lakeland Indians; Selma Cloverleafs	
1961	Salt Lake City Bees	—	Reading Indians	Burlington Indians	—	Dubuque Packers; Selma Cloverleafs	
1962	Jacksonville Suns; Salt Lake City Bees (Note: In 1962, the Indians shared the Triple-A Salt Lake City Bees with the Chicago Cubs.)	—	Charleston Indians	Burlington Indians	—	Dubuque Packers; Selma Cloverleafs	

=== 1963–1989 ===
Prior to the 1963 season, Major League Baseball (MLB) initiated a reorganization of Minor League Baseball that resulted in a reduction from six classes to four (Triple-A, Double-A, Class A, and Rookie) in response to the general decline of the minors throughout the 1950s and early-1960s when leagues and teams folded due to shrinking attendance caused by baseball fans' preference for staying at home to watch MLB games on television. The only change made within the next 27 years was Class A being subdivided for the first time to form Class A Short Season in 1966.

Season	Triple-A	Double-A	Class A	Class A Short Season	Rookie	Ref.
1963	Jacksonville Suns	Charleston Indians	Burlington Indians; Dubuque Packers; Grand Forks Chiefs	—	—	
1964	Portland Beavers	Charleston Indians	Burlington Indians; Dubuque Packers	—	—	
1965	Portland Beavers	Reading Indians	Dubuque Packers; Salinas Indians	—	—	
1966	Portland Beavers	Pawtucket Indians	Dubuque Packers; Reno Silver Sox	—	—	
1967	Portland Beavers	Pawtucket Indians	Reno Silver Sox; Rock Hill Indians	—	GCL Indians	
1968	Portland Beavers	Waterbury Indians	Reno Silver Sox; Rock Hill Indians	—	GCL Indians	
1969	Portland Beavers	Waterbury Indians	Reno Silver Sox; Statesville Indians / Monroe Indians	—	GCL Indians	
1970	Wichita Aeros	Savannah Indians	Reno Silver Sox; Sumter Indians	—	GCL Indians	
1971	Wichita Aeros	Jacksonville Suns	Reno Silver Sox	—	GCL Indians	
1972	Portland Beavers	Elmira Pioneers	Reno Silver Sox	—	GCL Indians	
1973	Oklahoma City 89ers	San Antonio Brewers	Reno Silver Sox	—	GCL Indians	
1974	Oklahoma City 89ers	San Antonio Brewers	Reno Silver Sox	—	GCL Indians	
1975	Oklahoma City 89ers	San Antonio Brewers	San Jose Bees	—	GCL Indians	
1976	Toledo Mud Hens	Williamsport Tomahawks	San Jose Bees	Batavia Trojans	—	
1977	Toledo Mud Hens	Jersey City Indians	Waterloo Indians	Batavia Trojans	—	
1978	Portland Beavers	Chattanooga Lookouts	Waterloo Indians	Batavia Trojans	—	
1979	Tacoma Tugs	Chattanooga Lookouts	Waterloo Indians	Batavia Trojans	—	
1980	Tacoma Tigers	Chattanooga Lookouts	Waterloo Indians	Batavia Trojans	—	
1981	Charleston Charlies	Chattanooga Lookouts	Waterloo Indians	Batavia Trojans	—	
1982	Charleston Charlies	Chattanooga Lookouts	Waterloo Indians	Batavia Trojans	—	
1983	Charleston Charlies	Buffalo Bisons	Waterloo Indians	Batavia Trojans	—	
1984	Maine Guides	Buffalo Bisons	Waterloo Indians	Batavia Trojans	—	
1985	Maine Guides	Waterbury Indians	Waterloo Indians	Batavia Trojans	—	
1986	Maine Guides	Waterbury Indians	Waterloo Indians	Batavia Trojans	Burlington Indians	
1987	Buffalo Bisons	Williamsport Bills	Kinston Indians; Waterloo Indians	—	Burlington Indians	
1988	Colorado Springs Sky Sox	Williamsport Bills	Kinston Indians; Waterloo Indians	—	Burlington Indians; GCL Indians	
1989	Colorado Springs Sky Sox	Canton–Akron Indians	Kinston Indians	Watertown Indians	Burlington Indians; GCL Indians	

=== 1990–2020 ===
Minor League Baseball operated with six classes from 1990 to 2020. In 1990, the Class A level was subdivided for a second time with the creation of Class A-Advanced. The Rookie level consisted of domestic and foreign circuits.

Season	Triple-A	Double-A	Class A-Advanced	Class A	Class A Short Season	Rookie	Foreign Rookie	Ref(s).
1990	Colorado Springs Sky Sox	Canton–Akron Indians	Kinston Indians; Reno Silver Sox	—	Watertown Indians	Burlington Indians; GCL Indians	DSL Indians	
1991	Colorado Springs Sky Sox	Canton–Akron Indians	Kinston Indians	Columbus Indians	Watertown Indians	Burlington Indians	DSL Indians	
1992	Colorado Springs Sky Sox	Canton–Akron Indians	Kinston Indians	Columbus RedStixx	Watertown Indians	Burlington Indians	DSL Indians	
1993	Charlotte Knights	Canton–Akron Indians	Kinston Indians	Columbus RedStixx	Watertown Indians	Burlington Indians	DSL Indians	
1994	Charlotte Knights	Canton–Akron Indians	Kinston Indians	Columbus RedStixx	Watertown Indians	Burlington Indians	DSL Indians	
1995	Buffalo Bisons	Canton–Akron Indians	Kinston Indians	Columbus RedStixx	Watertown Indians	Burlington Indians	DSL Indians	
1996	Buffalo Bisons	Canton–Akron Indians	Kinston Indians	Columbus RedStixx	Watertown Indians	Burlington Indians	DSL Indians	
1997	Buffalo Bisons	Akron Aeros	Kinston Indians	Columbus RedStixx	Watertown Indians	Burlington Indians	DSL Indians	
1998	Buffalo Bisons	Akron Aeros	Kinston Indians	Columbus RedStixx	Watertown Indians	Burlington Indians	DSL Indians	
1999	Buffalo Bisons	Akron Aeros	Kinston Indians	Columbus RedStixx	Mahoning Valley Scrappers	Burlington Indians	DSL Indians	
2000	Buffalo Bisons	Akron Aeros	Kinston Indians	Columbus RedStixx	Mahoning Valley Scrappers	Burlington Indians	DSL Indians; DSL Indians/Twins	
2001	Buffalo Bisons	Akron Aeros	Kinston Indians	Columbus RedStixx	Mahoning Valley Scrappers	Burlington Indians	DSL Indians; DSL Indians/Red Sox	
2002	Buffalo Bisons	Akron Aeros	Kinston Indians	Columbus RedStixx	Mahoning Valley Scrappers	Burlington Indians	DSL Indians 1 DSL Indians 2 VSL San Felipe	
2003	Buffalo Bisons	Akron Aeros	Kinston Indians	Lake County Captains	Mahoning Valley Scrappers	Burlington Indians	DSL Indians 1 DSL Indians 2 VSL San Felipe	
2004	Buffalo Bisons	Akron Aeros	Kinston Indians	Lake County Captains	Mahoning Valley Scrappers	Burlington Indians	DSL Indians 1 DSL Indians 2	
2005	Buffalo Bisons	Akron Aeros	Kinston Indians	Lake County Captains	Mahoning Valley Scrappers	Burlington Indians	DSL Indians 1 DSL Indians 2	
2006	Buffalo Bisons	Akron Aeros	Kinston Indians	Lake County Captains	Mahoning Valley Scrappers	Burlington Indians; GCL Indians	DSL Indians	
2007	Buffalo Bisons	Akron Aeros	Kinston Indians	Lake County Captains	Mahoning Valley Scrappers	GCL Indians	DSL Indians	
2008	Buffalo Bisons	Akron Aeros	Kinston Indians	Lake County Captains	Mahoning Valley Scrappers	GCL Indians	DSL Indians	
2009	Columbus Clippers	Akron Aeros	Kinston Indians	Lake County Captains	Mahoning Valley Scrappers	AZL Indians	DSL Indians	
2010	Columbus Clippers	Akron Aeros	Kinston Indians	Lake County Captains	Mahoning Valley Scrappers	AZL Indians	DSL Indians	
2011	Columbus Clippers	Akron Aeros	Kinston Indians	Lake County Captains	Mahoning Valley Scrappers	AZL Indians	DSL Indians	
2012	Columbus Clippers	Akron Aeros	Carolina Mudcats	Lake County Captains	Mahoning Valley Scrappers	AZL Indians	DSL Indians	
2013	Columbus Clippers	Akron Aeros	Carolina Mudcats	Lake County Captains	Mahoning Valley Scrappers	AZL Indians	DSL Indians	
2014	Columbus Clippers	Akron RubberDucks	Carolina Mudcats	Lake County Captains	Mahoning Valley Scrappers	AZL Indians	DSL Indians	
2015	Columbus Clippers	Akron RubberDucks	Lynchburg Hillcats	Lake County Captains	Mahoning Valley Scrappers	AZL Indians	DSL Indians	
2016	Columbus Clippers	Akron RubberDucks	Lynchburg Hillcats	Lake County Captains	Mahoning Valley Scrappers	AZL Indians	DSL Indians	
2017	Columbus Clippers	Akron RubberDucks	Lynchburg Hillcats	Lake County Captains	Mahoning Valley Scrappers	AZL Indians	DSL Indians; DSL Indians/Brewers	
2018	Columbus Clippers	Akron RubberDucks	Lynchburg Hillcats	Lake County Captains	Mahoning Valley Scrappers	AZL Indians 1 AZL Indians 2	DSL Indians; DSL Indians/Brewers	
2019	Columbus Clippers	Akron RubberDucks	Lynchburg Hillcats	Lake County Captains	Mahoning Valley Scrappers	AZL Indians Blue; AZL Indians Red	DSL Indians; DSL Indians/Brewers	
2020 (Note: The 2020 Minor League Baseball season was cancelled due to the COVID-19 pandemic.)	Columbus Clippers	Akron RubberDucks	Lynchburg Hillcats	Lake County Captains	Mahoning Valley Scrappers	AZL Indians Blue; AZL Indians Red	DSL Indians 1 DSL Indians 2	

=== 2021–present ===
The current structure of Minor League Baseball is the result of an overall contraction of the system beginning with the 2021 season. Class A was reduced to two levels: High-A and Low-A. Low-A was reclassified as Single-A in 2022.

Season	Triple-A	Double-A	High-A	Single-A	Rookie	Foreign Rookie	Ref.
2021	Columbus Clippers	Akron RubberDucks	Lake County Captains	Lynchburg Hillcats	ACL Indians	DSL Indians Blue; DSL Indians Red	
2022	Columbus Clippers	Akron RubberDucks	Lake County Captains	Lynchburg Hillcats	ACL Guardians	DSL Guardians Blue; DSL Guardians Red	
2023	Columbus Clippers	Akron RubberDucks	Lake County Captains	Lynchburg Hillcats	ACL Guardians	DSL Guardians Blue; DSL Guardians Red	
2024	Columbus Clippers	Akron RubberDucks	Lake County Captains	Lynchburg Hillcats	ACL Guardians	DSL Guardians Goryl; DSL Guardians Mendoza	
2025	Columbus Clippers	Akron RubberDucks	Lake County Captains	Lynchburg Hillcats	ACL Guardians	DSL Guardians Goryl; DSL Guardians Mendoza	
2026	Columbus Clippers	Akron RubberDucks	Lake County Captains	Hill City Howlers	ACL Guardians	DSL Guardians Goryl; DSL Guardians Mendoza	
