= Academia de Prospecto Complex =

Stadium complex in San Antonio de Guerra, Dominican Republic

Coordinates: 18.566253°N 69.698809°W

The insignia of the Cleveland Indians, the franchise that owns the Academia de Prospecto Complex.

The Academia de Prospecto Complex is a stadium complex in San Antonio de Guerra, Dominican Republic. It is the home of the Dominican Summer League Guardians and the Dominican Summer League Guardians/Brewers. It is also where the Cleveland Guardians organization conducts all of its Latin American operations.

== History ==
The stadium officially opened in May 2011, and since then it has been used to train the Dominican Summer League Guardians. It is where the team plays its home games. As of the 2017 DSL season, the DSL Guardians/Brewers cooperative team also plays its home games at the Academia de Prospecto Complex.

== Facilities ==
Chris Antonetti, current President of the Cleveland Guardians, described the academy as "state-of-the-art". The academy was designed to prepare young Dominican players for a future career with the Guardians in Major League Baseball. It has multiple fields for the players to practice on, and training mounds, batting tunnels, a classroom where the players can learn English, and other indoor training facilities and recreational areas.

== Staff ==
Jose Mejia is currently serving as the manager and field coordinator of the DSL Guardians. He is aided by Carlos Fermin, who is working as the infield coach. In addition to the coaches, the Cleveland Guardians' scouting staff, which is led by Koby Perez, will operate through the academy.
