= McCurdy Field =

Ball field in Frederick, Maryland, US

- Location within Maryland
- Full name: McCurdy Memorial Park
- Former names: Frederick County Athletic Field (1924–1936)
- Location: South Jefferson Street and Scholl's Lane; Frederick, Maryland, 21703
- Coordinates: 39°24′36″N 77°25′24″W
- Owner: City of Frederick
- Capacity: 2,500 (1924)
- Surface: grass
- Field size: Left Field: 348; Center Field: 600; Right Field: 506 (1924)

Construction
- Opened: May 13, 1924
- Renovated: 1974
- Cost: $15,000 (1924) $200,000 (1974)

Tenants
- Frederick Hustlers (BRL) 1924–1928; Frederick Warriors (BRL) 1929–1930; Syracuse Chiefs (IL) 1943 (spring training); Philadelphia Athletics (MLB) 1944–1945 (spring training); Frederick Keys (CL) 1989; Francis Scott Key Post #11 (American Legion) 1986-Present

Website
- McCurdy Field

McCurdy Field, located in Frederick, Maryland, is the former home of the Frederick Hustlers, Warriors, and Frederick Keys, a class A minor league affiliate of the Baltimore Orioles. The current stadium structure is largely an aluminum superstructure with dual brick buildings on the sides. The field first opened in 1924. McCurdy Field was the home of the Frederick teams of the minor league baseball Blue Ridge League from 1924 to 1930.

On Monday, September 6, 1937, the Washington Redskins played their first Washington-area game following their move from Boston. Washington beat an American Legion All-Star team by a score of 50-0 before a crowd of 1,000 at McCurdy.

During World War II, professional baseball teams conducted spring training in the north. The International League Syracuse Chiefs held spring training at McCurdy in 1943 and the Philadelphia Athletics also held spring training in Frederick in 1944 and 1945 and played their exhibition games at McCurdy Field.

Lights were installed in 1947. In 1968, the old wooden grandstand was condemned. It was torn down in 1971, leaving just the field. Bob Marendt led an effort to renovate the park, raising $50,000 in donations, and federal and state government paid for the balance. A renovated concrete and steel park opened in 1974, with metal bleachers that sat 1,500 and clubhouse facilities to host the Babe Ruth League 13-year-old national tournament.
