= Norm McNeil =

American baseball player (1892–1942)

- Catcher
- Born: October 22, 1892; Chicago, Illinois, US
- Died: April 11, 1942 (aged 49); Buffalo, New York, US
- Batted: Right Threw: Right

MLB debut
- June 21, 1919, for the Boston Red Sox

Last MLB appearance
- September 24, 1919, for the Boston Red Sox

MLB statistics
- Batting average: .333 (3-for-9)
- RBI: 0
- Home runs: 0
- Stats at Baseball Reference

Teams
- Boston Red Sox (1919)

Norman Francis McNeil (October 22, 1892 – April 11, 1942) was a professional baseball catcher and manager. He played five games with the 1919 Boston Red Sox of Major League Baseball (MLB). Listed at 5 feet 11 inches (1.80 m) and 180 pounds (82 kg), he batted and threw right-handed. He later was a manager in the minor leagues.

== Biography ==
McNeil played 10 seasons in the minor leagues, 1914–1918 and 1920–1924. He played in 565 games, making all of his defensive appearances as a catcher.

McNiel played in five major league games with the Boston Red Sox during the 1919 season; one game in June, one in August, and three in September. All of his at bats came during the three September games, when he batted 3-for-9. Two of his hits came against Bob Shawkey of the New York Yankees in McNeil's final game with the Red Sox, on September 24.

In 1923, McNiel was a player-manager with the minor league Frederick Hustlers in Frederick, Maryland. After his playing career, he served as manager of the minor league Johnstown Johnnies in Johnstown, Pennsylvania, during the 1925, 1926, and 1929 seasons.

Born in Chicago in 1892, McNeil died in Buffalo, New York, at age 49 in 1942. He was interred in Cheektowaga, New York.
