= Dominican Summer League Guardians =

Dominican Summer Guardians
- Boca Chica

Minor league affiliations
- Class: Rookie
- League: Dominican Summer League
- Division: Central Division (Goryl); Northwest Division (Mendoza)

Major league affiliations
- Team: Cleveland Guardians

Minor league titles
- League titles (2): 2002; 2004

Team data
- Name: DSL Guardians Goryl & Mendoza (2024–present)
- Previous names: DSL Guardians Blue & Red (2022–2023); DSL Indians Blue & Red (2021); DSL Indians & Indians/Brewers (2017–2019); DSL Indians (1990–2016)
- Ballpark: Academia de Prospecto Complex
- Owner(s)/ Operator(s): Cleveland Guardians
- Manager: Mac Seibert (Goryl); Jonathan López (Mendoza)

The Dominican Summer League Guardians are a minor league baseball team in Boca Chica, Dominican Republic. They are a Rookie-level team in the Dominican Summer League and are an affiliate of the Cleveland Guardians. Since 2011, the DSL Guardians have played their home games at the Academia de Prospecto Complex in San Antonio de Guerra.

From 2017 to 2019, the then-Indians operated an additional club, the DSL Indians/Brewers, in partnership with the Milwaukee Brewers. As of 2020, the Guardians operate the second DSL club on their own.

== Rosters ==
Dominican Summer League Guardians Goryl roster
Players		Coaches/Other
Pitchers: 32 Javier Abreu; 38 Enderson Amaya; 29 Wilinyer Ardiles; 48 Ronny Arias; 35 Randy Baron; 34 Joswal Betancourt; 33 Hector Castillo; 49 Luis Dorante; 39 Rey Feliz; 28 Alexander Garcia; 23 Daniel Gentile; 22 Jhordari Jiminez; 52 Jonaikel Meza; 30 Abrahan Milan; 40 Edelvis Perez; 47 Josh Perez; 41 Johander Rivero; 46 Rodarni Salvador; 54 Amilcar Teran; 58 Juan Yan ‡	Catchers: 27 Gustavo Baptista; 2 Wuinder Torres; 8 Santiago Ustariz; Infielders: 36 Angel Abreu; 15 Israel Alvarez; 4 Heins Brito; 6 Steven Cruz; 9 José Marcano; 13 Randy Martinez; 10 Ricardo Romero; 11 Rodny Rosario; Outfielders: 16 Freilyn Rodriguez; 24 Romer Taveras; 1 Osmar Torrealba	Manager: -- Mac Seibert; Coaches: -- Justin Devoid (hitting); -- Carlos Fermin (bench); -- Ronald Parra (pitching); -- José Rincon (bench); 60-day injured list: -- Wilfi Rodriguez; 7-day injured list * On Cleveland Guardians 40-man roster ~ Development list # Rehab assignment ∞ Reserve list ‡ Restricted list § Suspended list † Temporarily inactive list Roster updated June 2, 2025; Transactions → More rosters: MiLB • Dominican Summer League → Cleveland Guardians minor league players

Dominican Summer League Guardians Mendoza roster
Players		Coaches/Other
Pitchers: 15 Luilli Cabrera; 34 Handrychson Colina; 33 Victor De Jesús; 35 Yoshtner Farfan; 37 Jodainy Henriquez; 38 Daiher Hernandez; 45 Carlos Lopez; 24 Algeni Mejia; 30 Oscar Melgarejo; 44 Antwan Montana; 47 Abraham Negrin; 41 Erick Padilla; 52 Alejandro Rivera; 39 Julio Rossi; 32 Harrison Ruiz; 36 Carlos Sanchez; 27 Erich Tovar; 60 Raul Trujillo; 61 Delni Uribe; 48 Eriberto Vasquez	Catchers: 1 Robert Alvarez; 2 Pablo Arosemena; 6 Sebastian Cadiz; 4 Hiverson Lopez; Infielders: 7 Daniel Arias; 13 Alejandro Blasco; 8 Luis Galan; 9 Carlos Garces; 10 Luis Garcia; 12 Jose Riera; 17 Jefferson Vargas; 22 Nomar Velasquez; Outfielders: 23 Marcos Belen; 11 Carlos Caripa; -- Estivel Morillo	Manager: -- Jonathan López; Coaches: -- Jonathan Lozada (hitting); -- Jesús Tavárez (bench); -- Carlos Yan (pitching); 60-day injured list: -- Javier Pedreanez; 7-day injured list * On Cleveland Guardians 40-man roster ~ Development list # Rehab assignment ∞ Reserve list ‡ Restricted list § Suspended list † Temporarily inactive list Roster updated June 2, 2025; Transactions → More rosters: MiLB • Dominican Summer League → Cleveland Guardians minor league players
