= Ray Gardner (baseball) =

American baseball player (1901–1968)

- Shortstop
- Born: October 25, 1901; Frederick, Maryland, U.S.
- Died: May 3, 1968 (aged 66); Frederick, Maryland, U.S.
- Batted: Right Threw: Right

MLB debut
- April 16, 1929, for the Cleveland Indians

Last MLB appearance
- September 27, 1930, for the Cleveland Indians

MLB statistics
- Batting average: .253
- Home runs: 1
- Runs batted in: 25
- Stats at Baseball Reference

Teams
- Cleveland Indians (1929–1930)

Raymond Vincent Gardner (October 25, 1901 – May 3, 1968) was an American professional baseball shortstop and second baseman who appeared in 115 career games in Major League Baseball for the Cleveland Indians in 1929 and 1930. The native of Frederick, Maryland, threw and batted right-handed, stood 5 feet 8 inches (1.73 m) tall and weighed 145 pounds (66 kg).

Gardner played 12 seasons of professional ball, beginning in 1920. In his tenth year, 1929, he played in 82 games for Cleveland, 77 as the starting shortstop, and batted .262 with 67 hits. The following season, however, he played only 22 games in the field (without a single start), and collected only one hit in 13 at bats, scoring seven runs. All told, he batted .253 lifetime, with three doubles, two triples and one home run (hit June 29, 1929, at Navin Field off Emil Yde of the Detroit Tigers) among his 68 total hits. He had 25 runs batted in.

He retired from baseball in 1933 after playing 23 games at the highest level of the minors that season.
