= Leo Meyer (baseball) =

American baseball player (1888-1968)

- Shortstop
- Born: March 29, 1888; Iowa City, Iowa, U.S.
- Died: September 2, 1968 (aged 80); Smyrna, Delaware, U.S.
- Batted: Unknown Threw: Right

MLB debut
- September 27, 1909, for the Brooklyn Superbas

Last MLB appearance
- October 4, 1909, for the Brooklyn Superbas

MLB statistics
- Batting average: .130
- Home runs: 0
- Runs batted in: 0
- Stats at Baseball Reference

Teams
- Brooklyn Superbas (1909)

Leo Meyer (March 29, 1888, in Iowa City, Iowa – September 2, 1968, in Smyrna, Delaware), was an American Major League Baseball player who played shortstop for the Brooklyn Superbas in 1909.

After his year with the Superbas, he played several more years in the minor leagues. His best year in the minor leagues was with the Trenton Tigers of the Tri-State League. That year he had a .273 average 431 at bats. He also hit four home runs that year in the "dead ball" era. His last year in the minor leagues was with the Nashville Volunteers of the Southern Association in 1919.
