= Ray Hartranft =

American baseball player (1890-1955)

- Pitcher
- Born: September 19, 1890; Quakertown, Pennsylvania, U.S.
- Died: February 10, 1955 (aged 64); Spring City, Pennsylvania, U.S.
- Batted: Left Threw: Left

MLB debut
- June 16, 1913, for the Philadelphia Phillies

Last MLB appearance
- June 16, 1913, for the Philadelphia Phillies

MLB statistics
- Record: 0-0
- ERA: 9.00
- Strikeouts: 1
- Stats at Baseball Reference

Teams
- Philadelphia Phillies (1913)

Raymond Joseph Hartranft (September 19, 1890 – February 10, 1955) was an American Major League Baseball pitcher. Hartranft played for the Philadelphia Phillies in 1913.
