= Larry Boerner =

American baseball player (1905–1969)

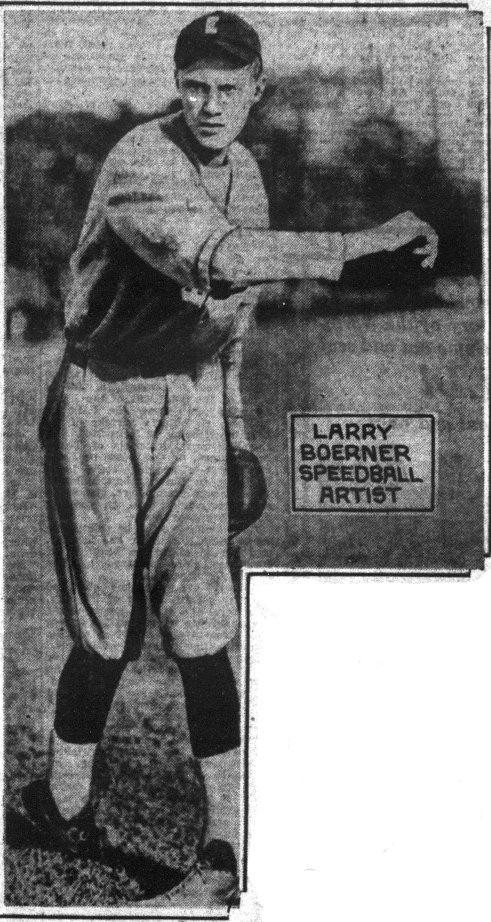
- Pitcher
- Born: January 21, 1905; Staunton, Virginia, U.S.
- Died: October 16, 1969 (aged 64); Staunton, Virginia, U.S.
- Batted: Right Threw: Right

MLB debut
- June 30, 1932, for the Boston Red Sox

Last MLB appearance
- September 24, 1932, for the Boston Red Sox

MLB statistics
- Win–loss record: 0-4
- Strikeouts: 19
- Earned run average: 5.02
- Stats at Baseball Reference

Teams
- Boston Red Sox (1932)

Lawrence Hyer Boerner (January 21, 1905 – October 16, 1969) was an American pitcher in Major League Baseball who played for the Boston Red Sox. Boerner batted and threw right-handed.

Boerner was signed as a free agent out of McDaniel College in 1932 by the Boston Red Sox. He debuted on June 30, 1932, and played his final game on September 24, 1932.

In his only major league season, Boerner posted a 0–4 record with a 5.02 ERA, 19 strikeouts, and 61 innings in 21 games pitched (five as a starter.

Boerner died in Staunton, Virginia, at age 64.
