= Tom Connolly (third baseman) =

American baseball player

- Third baseman / Outfielder
- Born: December 30, 1892; Boston, Massachusetts, U.S.
- Died: May 14, 1966 (aged 73); Boston, Massachusetts, U.S.
- Batted: Left Threw: Right

MLB debut
- May 12, 1915, for the Washington Senators

Last MLB appearance
- October 2, 1915, for the Washington Senators

MLB statistics
- Batting average: .184
- Home runs: 0
- Runs batted in: 7
- Stats at Baseball Reference

Teams
- Washington Senators (1915)

Thomas Francis Connolly (December 30, 1892 – May 14, 1966) was an American professional baseball player. His minor-league career spanned 1915 to 1927. He played in the major leagues as a third baseman and outfielder for the 1915 Washington Senators. In 50 games with the Senators, he compiled a .184 batting average with seven runs batted in (RBIs).
