= Jim Keesey =

American baseball player (1902-1951)

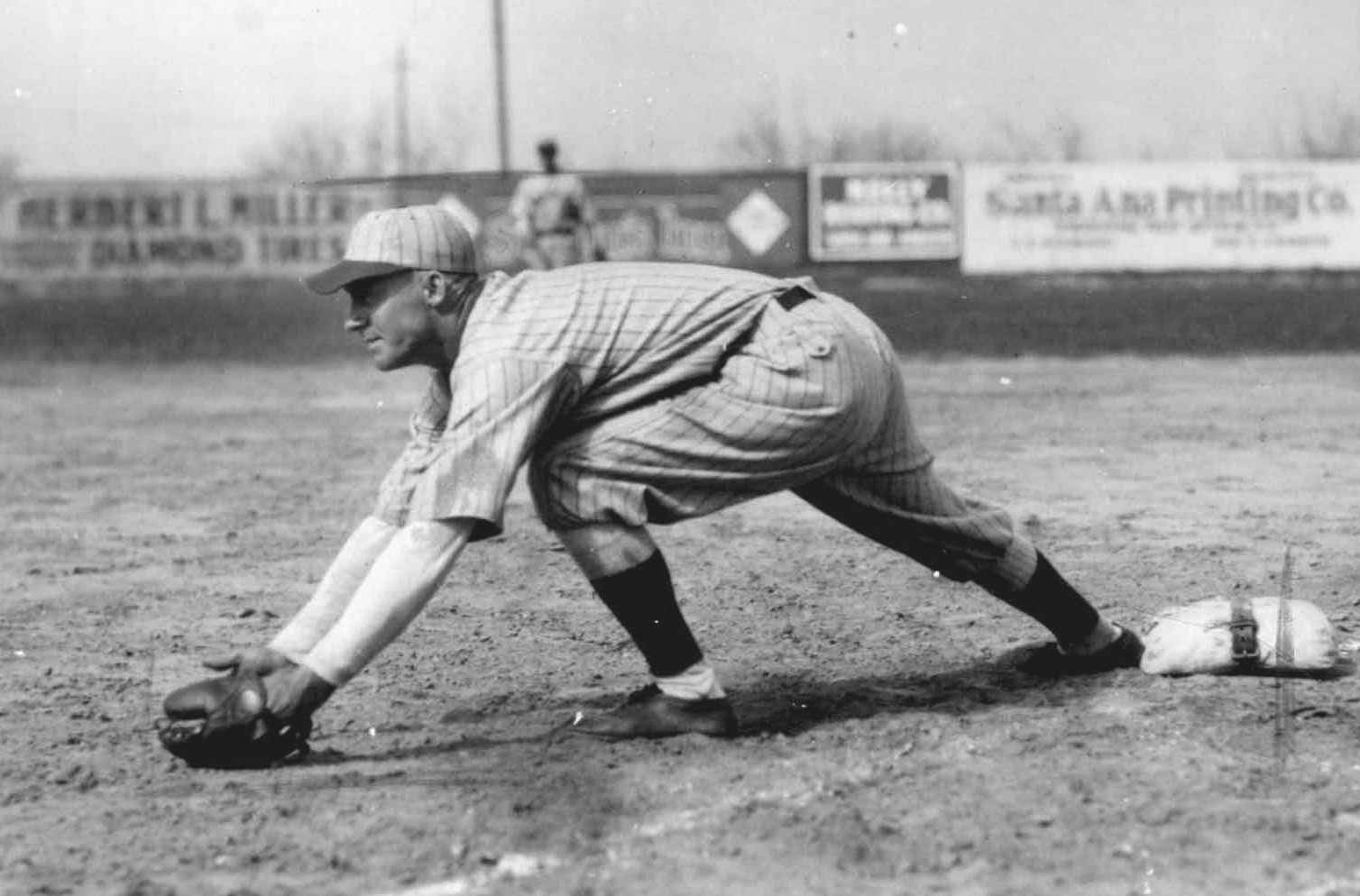
- First baseman
- Born: October 27, 1902; Perryville, Maryland, U.S.
- Died: September 5, 1951 (aged 48); Boise, Idaho, U.S.
- Batted: Right Threw: Right

MLB debut
- September 6, 1925, for the Philadelphia Athletics

Last MLB appearance
- June 25, 1930, for the Philadelphia Athletics

MLB statistics
- Batting average: .294
- Home runs: 0
- RBI: 3
- Stats at Baseball Reference

Teams
- Philadelphia Athletics (1925, 1930)

James Ward Keesey (October 27, 1902 – September 5, 1951) was an American professional baseball player. He played in 5 games for the Major League Baseball Philadelphia Athletics during the 1925 season and 11 games during the 1930 season. He was born in Perryville, Maryland, and died in Boise, Idaho, at the age of 48.
