= Bill Lamar =

American baseball player (1897–1970)

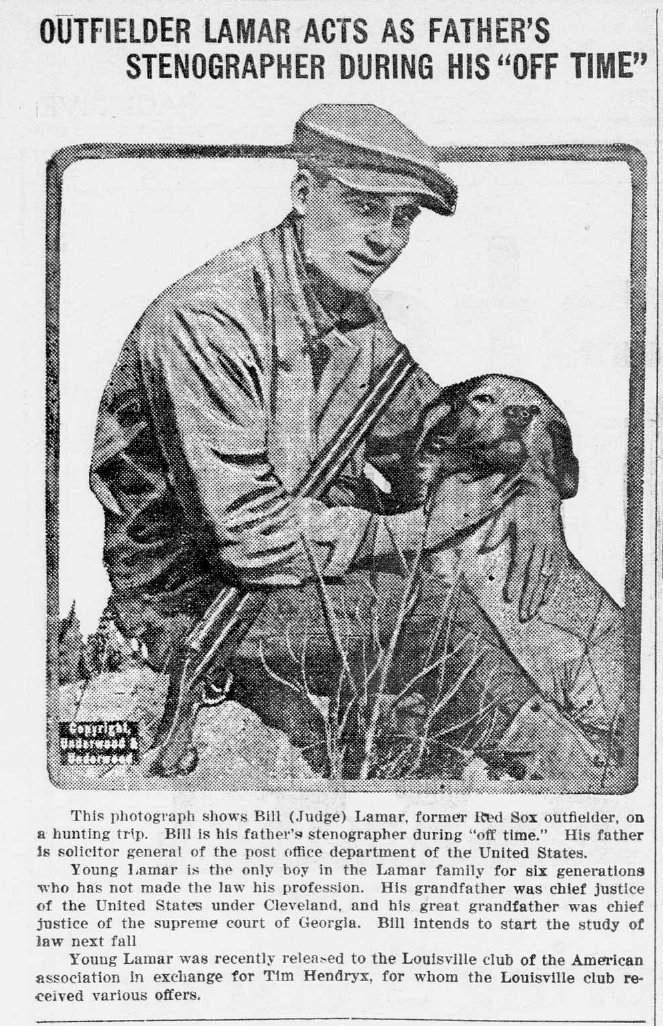
- Left fielder
- Born: March 21, 1897; Rockville, Maryland, U.S.
- Died: May 24, 1970 (aged 73); Rockport, Massachusetts, U.S.
- Batted: Left Threw: Right

MLB debut
- September 19, 1917, for the New York Yankees

Last MLB appearance
- August 6, 1927, for the Philadelphia Athletics

MLB statistics
- Batting average: .310
- Home runs: 19
- Runs batted in: 245
- Stats at Baseball Reference

Teams
- New York Yankees (1917–1919); Boston Red Sox (1919); Brooklyn Robins (1920–1921); Philadelphia Athletics (1924–1927)

William Harmong Lamar [Good Time Bill] (March 21, 1897 – May 24, 1970) was an American left fielder in Major League Baseball who played from 1917 through 1927 for the New York Yankees, Boston Red Sox, Brooklyn Robins, and Philadelphia Athletics. Listed at 6 ft 1 in (1.85 m), 185 lb., Lamar batted left-handed and threw right-handed. He was born in Rockville, Maryland.

In a nine-season career, Lamar was a .310 hitter (633-for-2040) with 19 home runs and 245 RBI in 550 games, including 303 runs, 114 doubles, 23 triples, 25 stolen bases, and a 1.10 walk-to-strikeout ratio (86-to-78).

Lamar died in Rockport, Massachusetts at age 73.

== Highlights ==
- In 1925 posted career-highs with a .356 average (7th in American League), 202 hits, 85 runs, 77 RBI and 50 extra-base hits, including a 28-game hitting-streak.
- Appeared in the 1920 World Series.

== Sources ==
- Career statistics from Baseball Reference · Baseball Reference (Minors) · Retrosheet · Baseball Almanac
- Retrosheet
