= Chick Fullis =

American baseball player (1904–1946)

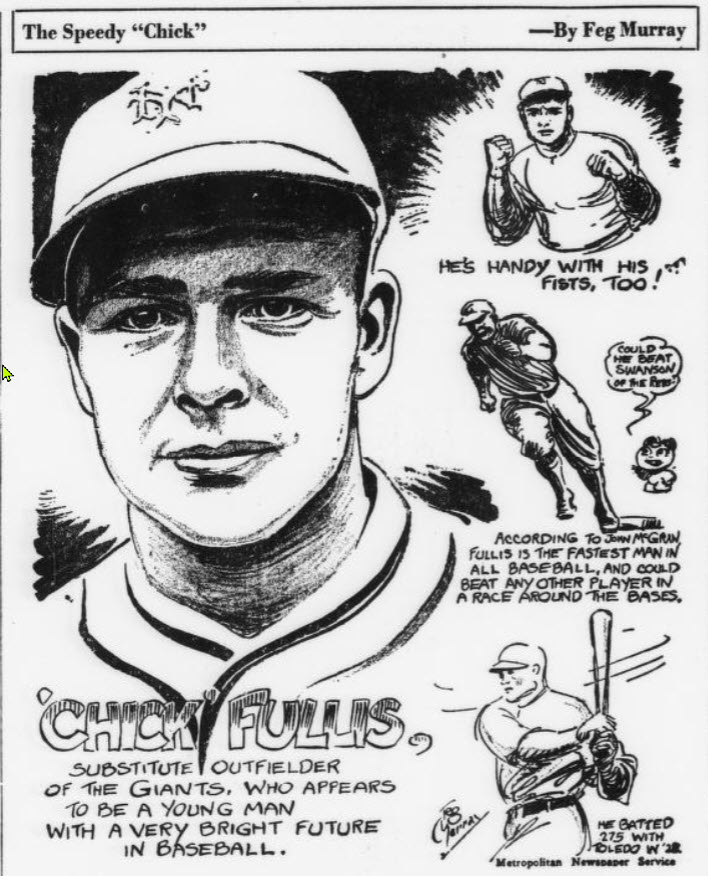
- Center fielder
- Born: February 27, 1901; Girardville, Pennsylvania, U.S.
- Died: March 28, 1946 (aged 45); Ashland, Pennsylvania, U.S.
- Batted: Right Threw: Right

MLB debut
- April 13, 1928, for the New York Giants

Last MLB appearance
- September 26, 1936, for the St. Louis Cardinals

MLB statistics
- Batting average: .295
- Home runs: 12
- Runs batted in: 167
- Stats at Baseball Reference

Teams
- New York Giants (1928–1932); Philadelphia Phillies (1933–1934); St. Louis Cardinals (1934, 1936)

Career highlights and awards
- World Series champion (1934)

Charles Philip "Chick" Fullis (February 27, 1901 – March 28, 1946) was an American professional baseball player. He played all or part of eight seasons in Major League Baseball for the New York Giants (1928–32), Philadelphia Phillies (1933–34) and St. Louis Cardinals (1934, 1936), primarily as a center fielder. Fullis batted and threw right-handed.

== Biography ==
Born in Girardville, Pennsylvania, Fullis posted a .295 batting average with 12 home runs and 167 RBI in 590 games played during his career. He was a member of the Cardinals' 1934 World Series winners. Fullis was forced to retire at age 33 due to eye trouble.

Fullis' best season statistically came in 1933, the only season during his career in which he exceeded 100 games played. That year, he led the National League in at bats (647) and singles (162) while posting a .309 batting average with 200 hits, 91 runs, 45 RBI, 31 doubles and 18 stolen bases—all career highs. He also led all NL outfielders with 410 putouts.

== Death ==
Fullis died in Ashland, Pennsylvania, at the age of 45 from uremia.

== Sources ==
- Baseball Almanac
- Career statistics from Baseball Reference · Baseball Reference (Minors) · Retrosheet · Baseball Almanac
- Obituary listing at The Deadball Era
