= Clarence Blethen =

American baseball player (1893–1973)

- Pitcher
- Born: July 11, 1893; Dover-Foxcroft, Maine, U.S.
- Died: April 11, 1973 (aged 79); Frederick, Maryland, U.S.
- Batted: Left Threw: Right

MLB debut
- September 17, 1923, for the Boston Red Sox

Last MLB appearance
- September 26, 1929, for the Brooklyn Robins

MLB statistics
- Win–loss record: 0–0
- Earned run average: 7.32
- Strikeouts: 2
- Stats at Baseball Reference

Teams
- Boston Red Sox (1923); Brooklyn Robins (1929)

Clarence Waldo Blethen (July 11, 1893 – April 11, 1973) was an American professional baseball pitcher with the Boston Red Sox and Brooklyn Robins of Major League Baseball as well as 18 seasons in minor league baseball. Blethen batted left-handed and threw right-handed. Blethen attended the University of Maine, where he played college baseball for the Black Bears from 1912 to 1915.

Blethen spent 18 years in organized baseball, almost all of it in the minor leagues. He pitched briefly for the Boston Red Sox in 1923 and did not earn another opportunity until 1929, when he played with the Brooklyn Robins. In seven major league games, Blethen had no decisions and posted a 7.32 ERA, with two strikeouts in 19-2/3 innings pitched.

Blethen suffered an unusual injury while playing for the Knoxville Smokies of the Southern Association in 1933. In a game on June 6, the pitcher, who had false teeth and would put them in his hip pocket when he was running the bases, slid into second base, and the false teeth took a bite out of him in what one news account called "a tender spot."

Following his major league career, Blethen spent seven years with the Atlanta minor league club, winning 20 or more games in two seasons. He also played for several teams and managed Leaksville and Savannah in the late 1930s. After that, Blethen took an active part in coaching little leaguers until the mid-1960s.

Blethen died in Frederick, Maryland, at age 79.
