= Clyde Barnhart =

American baseball player (1895–1980)

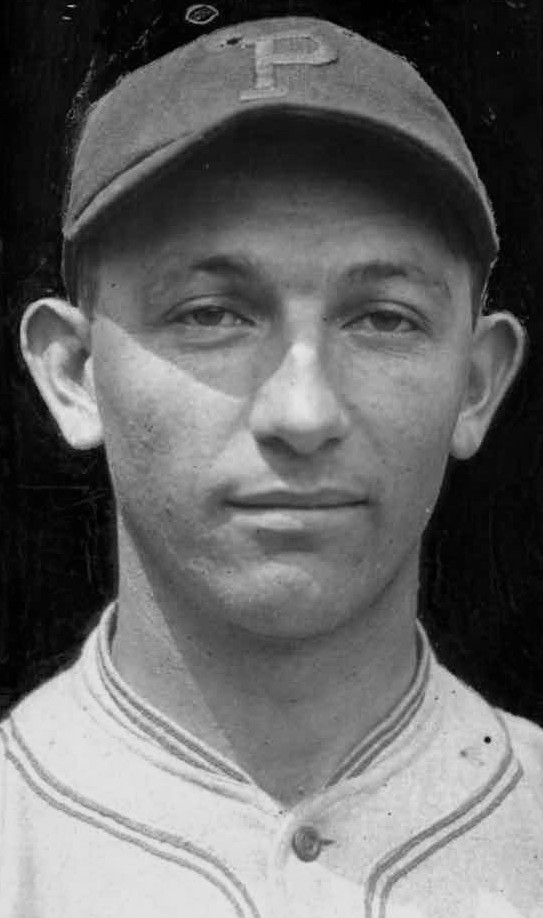
- Outfielder / Third baseman
- Born: December 29, 1895; Buck Valley, Pennsylvania, U.S.
- Died: January 21, 1980 (aged 84); Hagerstown, Maryland, U.S.
- Batted: Right Threw: Right

MLB debut
- September 22, 1920, for the Pittsburgh Pirates

Last MLB appearance
- August 23, 1928, for the Pittsburgh Pirates

MLB statistics
- Batting average: .295
- Home runs: 27
- Runs batted in: 436
- Stats at Baseball Reference

Teams
- Pittsburgh Pirates (1920–1928)

Career highlights and awards
- World Series champion (1925)

Clyde Lee Barnhart (December 29, 1895 – January 21, 1980) was an American right-handed outfielder and third baseman in Major League Baseball who played for the Pittsburgh Pirates. He attended Cumberland Valley State Normal School (now Shippensburg University of Pennsylvania), where he played college baseball and basketball. Barnhart was inducted into the Shippensburg University Hall of Fame in 1986. He is the father of Vic Barnhart who played three years in major league baseball, also for the Pittsburgh Pirates.

== Career ==
Barnhart made his major league debut on September 22, 1920, with the Pirates at age 24. That year, Barnhart had a batting average of .326 in 46 at bats in 12 games. In 1921, Barnhart was promoted to a starter. That year he hit .258 in 449 at bats in 124 games. The Pirates, however, were not satisfied with his statistics, so they demoted him to the bench.

In 1922, Barnhart hit .330 in 209 at bats in 75 games, giving him the third highest batting average on the team. With those statistics, Barnhart was again promoted. In 1923, he hit .324 in 327 at bats in 114 games. Barnhart's success continued, especially in 1925, when he had 114 runs batted in, second on a team that went on to win the World Series that year. In 1928, Barnhart was plagued with injuries; he recorded a .296 batting average in 196 at bats in 61 games. Barnhart's last game was on August 23 of that year.

At the time of his retirement, Barnhart had a career batting average of .295. He finished with 2673 at bats in 814 games. He drove in 436 runs during his career. Barnhart hit 27 home runs over the course of his career. His lifetime fielding percentage was .967.

Barnhart is the only major league player to get hits in three games in one day. He collected hits in each game of a rare triple-header played on October 2, 1920. He did this just 10 days after making his major league debut.

== Statistics ==
Career statistics:

Year	G	AB	H	2B	3B	HR	R	RBI	BB	SO	AVG	OBP	SLG	OPS+	FLD%
Career	814	2673	788	121	61	27	404	436	265	149	.295	.360	.416	100	.967
