= Tom Crooke =

American baseball player

- First baseman
- Born: July 26, 1884; Washington, D.C., U.S.
- Died: April 4, 1929 (aged 44); Quantico, Virginia, U.S.
- Batted: Right Threw: Right

MLB debut
- September 29, 1909, for the Washington Senators

Last MLB appearance
- May 9, 1910, for the Washington Senators

MLB statistics
- Batting average: .214
- Home runs: 0
- Runs batted in: 3
- Stats at Baseball Reference

Teams
- Washington Senators (1909–1910)

Thomas Aloysius Crooke (July 26, 1884 – April 4, 1929) was an American first baseman in Major League Baseball. He played for the Washington Senators in 1909 and 1910.
