= Bill Hohman =

American baseball player (1903-1968)

William Henry Hohman
- Outfielder
- Born: November 27, 1903; Brooklyn, Maryland
- Died: October 29, 1968 (aged 64); Baltimore, Maryland
- Batted: Left Threw: Left

MLB debut
- August 24, 1927, for the Philadelphia Phillies

Last MLB appearance
- September 30, 1927, for the Philadelphia Phillies

MLB statistics
- At bats: 18
- RBI: 0
- Home runs: 0
- Batting average: .278
- Stats at Baseball Reference

Teams
- Philadelphia Phillies 1927

Career highlights and awards

William Henry Hohman (November 27, 1903 – October 29, 1968) was an American professional baseball player who played in seven games for the Philadelphia Phillies during the 1927 season. He was born in Brooklyn, Maryland and died at the age of 64 in Baltimore, Maryland.
