= 2005 California League season =

- League: California League
- Sport: Baseball
- Duration: April 7 – September 5
- Games: 140
- Teams: 10

Regular season
- League champions: San Jose Giants
- Season MVP: Brandon Wood, Rancho Cucamonga Quakes

Playoffs
- League champions: San Jose Giants
- Runners-up: Lake Elsinore Storm

CALL seasons
- ← 2004 2006 →

The 2005 California League was a Class A-Advanced baseball season played between April 7 and September 5. Ten teams played a 140-game schedule, as three teams from each division qualified for the post-season, the winner of each half of the season plus playoff qualifiers.

The San Jose Giants won the California League championship, as they defeated the Lake Elsinore Storm in the final round of the playoffs.

== Team changes ==
- The Bakersfield Blaze ended their affiliation with the Tampa Bay Devil Rays and began a new affiliation with the Texas Rangers.
- The High Desert Mavericks ended their affiliation with the Milwaukee Brewers and began a new affiliation with the Kansas City Royals.
- The Modesto A's ended their affiliation with the Oakland Athletics and began a new affiliation with the Colorado Rockies. The club was renamed to the Modesto Nuts.
- The Stockton Ports ended their affiliation with the Texas Rangers and began a new affiliation with the Oakland Athletics.
- The Visalia Oaks ended their affiliation with the Colorado Rockies and began a new affiliation with the Tampa Bay Devil Rays.

== Teams ==
2005 California League
Division	Team	City	MLB Affiliate	Stadium
North	Bakersfield Blaze	Bakersfield, California	Texas Rangers	Sam Lynn Ballpark
North	Modesto Nuts	Modesto, California	Colorado Rockies	John Thurman Field
North	San Jose Giants	San Jose, California	San Francisco Giants	San Jose Municipal Stadium
North	Stockton Ports	Stockton, California	Oakland Athletics	Banner Island Ballpark
North	Visalia Oaks	Visalia, California	Tampa Bay Devil Rays	Recreation Park
South	High Desert Mavericks	Adelanto, California	Kansas City Royals	Maverick Stadium
South	Inland Empire 66ers	San Bernardino, California	Seattle Mariners	Arrowhead Credit Union Park
South	Lake Elsinore Storm	Lake Elsinore, California	San Diego Padres	Lake Elsinore Diamond
South	Lancaster JetHawks	Lancaster, California	Arizona Diamondbacks	Clear Channel Stadium
South	Rancho Cucamonga Quakes	Rancho Cucamonga, California	Los Angeles Angels of Anaheim	Rancho Cucamonga Epicenter

== Map of teams ==
North Division South Division

== Regular season ==
=== Summary ===
- The San Jose Giants finished with the best record in the regular season for the first time since 1998.

=== Standings ===
North Division
Team	Win	Loss	%	GB
San Jose Giants	85	55	.607	–
Stockton Ports	78	62	.557	7
Modesto Nuts	72	67	.518	12.5
Bakersfield Blaze	68	72	.486	17
Visalia Oaks	55	85	.393	30
South Division
Team	Win	Loss	%	GB
High Desert Mavericks	75	65	.536	–
Lancaster JetHawks	75	65	.536	–
Lake Elsinore Storm	70	68	.507	4
Rancho Cucamonga Quakes	62	77	.446	12.5
Inland Empire 66ers	58	82	.414	17

== League Leaders ==
=== Batting leaders ===
Stat	Player	Total
AVG	Miguel Montero, Lancaster JetHawks	.349
H	Ángel Sánchez, High Desert Mavericks	183
R	Brandon Wood, Rancho Cucamonga Quakes	109
2B	Brandon Wood, Rancho Cucamonga Quakes	51
3B	Clay Timpner, San Jose Giants	12
HR	Brandon Wood, Rancho Cucamonga Quakes	43
RBI	Chris Lubanski, High Desert Mavericks	116
SB	Clay Timpner, San Jose Giants	34

=== Pitching leaders ===
Stat	Player	Total
W	Garrett Mock, Lancaster JetHawks	14
ERA	Jared Wells, Lake Elsinore Storm	3.44
CG	Jared Wells, Lake Elsinore Storm	2
SHO	Thomas Diamond, Bakersfield Blaze; John Gragg, High Desert Mavericks; Jared Wells, Lake Elsinore Storm	1
SV	Leo Rosales, Lake Elsinore Storm	27
IP	Jason Mackintosh, Inland Empire 66ers	179.2
SO	Garrett Mock, Lancaster JetHawks	160

== Playoffs ==
- The San Jose Giants won their sixth California League championship, as they defeated the Lake Elsinore Storm in five games.

=== Playoff bracket ===
Division semi-finals
N1	San Jose	bye
N2	Stockton	0
N3	Modesto	2
S1	Lake Elsinore	bye
S2	High Desert	1
S3	Lancaster	2

Division finals
N1	San Jose	3
N3	Modesto	0
S1	Lake Elsinore	3
S3	Lancaster	0

Finals
N1	San Jose	3
S1	Lake Elsinore	2

== Awards ==
California League awards
Award name	Recipient
Most Valuable Player	Brandon Wood, Rancho Cucamonga Quakes

== See also ==
- 2005 Major League Baseball season
