= 2004 California League season =

- League: California League
- Sport: Baseball
- Duration: April 8 – September 5
- Games: 140
- Teams: 10

Regular season
- League champions: Modesto A's
- Season MVP: Brian Stavisky, Modesto A's

Playoffs
- League champions: Modesto A's
- Runners-up: Lancaster JetHawks

CALL seasons
- ← 2003 2005 →

The 2004 California League was a Class A-Advanced baseball season played between April 8 and September 5. Ten teams played a 140-game schedule, as three teams from each division qualified for the post-season, the winner of each half of the season plus playoff qualifiers.

The Modesto A's won the California League championship, as they defeated the Lancaster JetHawks in the final round of the playoffs.

== Teams ==
2004 California League
Division	Team	City	MLB Affiliate	Stadium
North	Bakersfield Blaze	Bakersfield, California	Tampa Bay Devil Rays	Sam Lynn Ballpark
North	Modesto A's	Modesto, California	Oakland Athletics	John Thurman Field
North	San Jose Giants	San Jose, California	San Francisco Giants	San Jose Municipal Stadium
North	Stockton Ports	Stockton, California	Texas Rangers	Billy Hebert Field
North	Visalia Oaks	Visalia, California	Colorado Rockies	Recreation Park
South	High Desert Mavericks	Adelanto, California	Milwaukee Brewers	Maverick Stadium
South	Inland Empire 66ers	San Bernardino, California	Seattle Mariners	Arrowhead Credit Union Park
South	Lake Elsinore Storm	Lake Elsinore, California	San Diego Padres	Lake Elsinore Diamond
South	Lancaster JetHawks	Lancaster, California	Arizona Diamondbacks	The Hangar
South	Rancho Cucamonga Quakes	Rancho Cucamonga, California	Anaheim Angels	Rancho Cucamonga Epicenter

== Map of teams ==
North Division South Division

== Regular season ==
=== Summary ===
- The Modesto A's finished with the best record in the regular season for the first time since 1999.

=== Standings ===
North Division
Team	Win	Loss	%	GB
Modesto A's	90	50	.643	–
San Jose Giants	74	66	.529	16
Stockton Ports	72	68	.514	18
Bakersfield Blaze	59	81	.421	31
Visalia Oaks	56	84	.400	34
South Division
Team	Win	Loss	%	GB
Lancaster JetHawks	86	54	.614	–
Inland Empire 66ers	77	63	.550	9
Rancho Cucamonga Quakes	69	71	.493	17
Lake Elsinore Storm	68	72	.486	18
High Desert Mavericks	49	91	.350	37

== League Leaders ==
=== Batting leaders ===
Stat	Player	Total
AVG	Brian Stavisky, Modesto A's	.343
H	Erick Aybar, Rancho Cucamonga Quakes	189
R	Brian Stavisky, Modesto A's	108
2B	Isaac Garcia, Modesto A's	41
3B	Gary Harris, Inland Empire 66ers	18
HR	Mike Napoli, Rancho Cucamonga Quakes	29
RBI	Mike Napoli, Rancho Cucamonga Quakes	118
SB	Erick Aybar, Rancho Cucamonga Quakes	51

=== Pitching leaders ===
Stat	Player	Total
W	Enrique González, Lancaster JetHawks; Matt Lynch, Modesto A's	13
ERA	Brian Burres, San Jose Giants	2.84
CG	Ben Crockett, Visalia Oaks; Steven Shell, Rancho Cucamonga Quakes; Jean Toledo, Rancho Cucamonga Quakes	2
SHO	Ben Crockett, Visalia Oaks; Bobby Livingston, Inland Empire 66ers Manny Parra, High Desert Mavericks; Steven Shell, Rancho Cucamonga Quakes; James Shields, Bakersfield Blaze	1
SV	Jeremy Accardo, San Jose Giants	27
IP	Bobby Livingston, Inland Empire 66ers	186.2
SO	Steven Shell, San Jose Giants	190

== Playoffs ==
- The Modesto A's won their eighth California League championship, as they defeated the Lancaster JetHawks in five games.

=== Playoff bracket ===
Division semi-finals
N1	Modesto	bye
N2	San Jose	2
N3	Stockton	1
S1	Lancaster	bye
S2	Inland Empire	2
S3	Rancho Cucamonga	0

Division finals
N1	Modesto	3
N2	San Jose	2
S1	Lancaster	3
S2	Inland Empire	1

Finals
N1	Modesto	3
S1	Lancaster	2

== Awards ==
California League awards
Award name	Recipient
Most Valuable Player	Brian Stavisky, Modesto A's

== See also ==
- 2004 Major League Baseball season
