= 2001 California League season =

- League: California League
- Sport: Baseball
- Duration: April 5 – September 3
- Games: 140
- Teams: 10

Regular season
- League champions: Lake Elsinore Storm
- Season MVP: Xavier Nady, Lake Elsinore Storm

Playoffs
- League champions: Lake Elsinore Storm; San Jose Giants

CALL seasons
- ← 2000 2002 →

The 2001 California League was a Class A-Advanced baseball season played between April 5 and September 3. Ten teams played a 140-game schedule, as three teams from each division qualified for the post-season, the winner of each half of the season plus playoff qualifiers.

The Lake Elsinore Storm and San Jose Giants were named co-champions of the league as the final round of the playoffs was cancelled due to the September 11 terrorist attacks on New York and Washington, D.C..

== Team changes ==
- The Bakersfield Blaze ended their affiliation with the San Francisco Giants and began a new affiliation with the Tampa Bay Devil Rays.
- The High Desert Mavericks ended their affiliation with the Arizona Diamondbacks and began a new affiliation with the Milwaukee Brewers.
- The Lake Elsinore Storm ended their affiliation with the Anaheim Angels and began a new affiliation with the San Diego Padres.
- The Lancaster JetHawks ended their affiliation with the Seattle Mariners and began a new affiliation with the Arizona Diamondbacks.
- The Mudville Nine ended their affiliation with the Milwaukee Brewers and began a new affiliation with the Cincinnati Reds.
- The Rancho Cucamonga Quakes ended their affiliation with the San Diego Padres and began a new affiliation with the Anaheim Angels.
- The San Bernardino Stampede ended their affiliation with the Los Angeles Dodgers and began a new affiliation with the Seattle Mariners.

== Teams ==
2001 California League
Division	Team	City	MLB Affiliate	Stadium
North	Bakersfield Blaze	Bakersfield, California	Tampa Bay Devil Rays	Sam Lynn Ballpark
North	Modesto A's	Modesto, California	Oakland Athletics	John Thurman Field
North	Mudville Nine	Stockton, California	Cincinnati Reds	Billy Hebert Field
North	San Jose Giants	San Jose, California	San Francisco Giants	San Jose Municipal Stadium
North	Visalia Oaks	Visalia, California	Oakland Athletics	Recreation Park
South	High Desert Mavericks	Adelanto, California	Milwaukee Brewers	Maverick Stadium
South	Lake Elsinore Storm	Lake Elsinore, California	San Diego Padres	Lake Elsinore Diamond
South	Lancaster JetHawks	Lancaster, California	Arizona Diamondbacks	The Hangar
South	Rancho Cucamonga Quakes	Rancho Cucamonga, California	Anaheim Angels	Rancho Cucamonga Epicenter
South	San Bernardino Stampede	San Bernardino, California	Seattle Mariners	Arrowhead Credit Union Park

== Map of teams ==
North Division South Division

== Regular season ==
=== Summary ===
- The Lake Elsinore Storm finished with the best record in the regular season for the first time in team history.

=== Standings ===
North Division
Team	Win	Loss	%	GB
San Jose Giants	77	63	.550	–
Mudville Nine	74	66	.529	3
Bakersfield Blaze	71	69	.507	6
Visalia Oaks	61	79	.436	16
Modesto A's	55	85	.393	22
South Division
Team	Win	Loss	%	GB
Lake Elsinore Storm	91	49	.650	–
San Bernardino Stampede	76	64	.543	15
High Desert Mavericks	71	69	.507	20
Rancho Cucamonga Quakes	63	77	.450	28
Lancaster JetHawks	61	79	.436	30

== League Leaders ==
=== Batting leaders ===
Stat	Player	Total
AVG	Chris Snelling, San Bernardino Stampede	.336
H	Matt Diaz, Bakersfield Blaze	172
R	Steve Scarborough, High Desert Mavericks	101
2B	Marshall McDougall, Visalia Oaks	43
3B	Arturo McDowell, San Jose Giants	11
HR	Tim Flaherty, San Jose Giants; Billy Martin, Lancaster JetHawks; Xavier Nady, Lake Elsinore Storm	26
RBI	Billy Martin, Lancaster JetHawks	106
SB	Carlos Rosario, Visalia Oaks	54

=== Pitching leaders ===
Stat	Player	Total
W	Vance Cozier, San Jose Giants	15
ERA	Craig Anderson, San Bernardino Stampede	2.26
CG	Rafael Soriano, San Bernardino Stampede	2
SHO	Justin Carter, Mudville Nine; Scott Dunn, Mudville Nine; Hatuey Mendoza, Lancaster JetHawks; Francisco Rodríguez, Rancho Cucamonga Quakes; Rafael Soriano, San Bernardino Stampede; Steve Watkins, Lake Elsinore Storm	1
SV	Luke Anderson, San Jose Giants	30
IP	Craig Anderson, San Bernardino Stampede	179.0
SO	Matt Thornton, San Bernardino Stampede	192

== Playoffs ==
- The final round of the playoffs was cancelled after three games due to the September 11 terrorist attacks on New York and Washington, D.C.. The Lake Elsinore Storm and San Jose Giants were declared co-champions.
- The Lake Elsinore Storm won their second championship in team history.
- The San Jose Giants won their fifth championship in team history.

=== Playoff bracket ===
Division semi-finals
N1	San Jose	bye
N2	Mudville	1
N3	Bakersfield	2
S1	Lake Elsinore	bye
S2	San Bernardino	1
S3	High Desert	2

Division finals
N1	San Jose	2
N3	Bakersfield	1
S1	Lake Elsinore	3
S3	High Desert	0

Finals
N1	San Jose
S1	Lake Elsinore

== Awards ==
California League awards
Award name	Recipient
Most Valuable Player	Xavier Nady, Lake Elsinore Storm

== See also ==
- 2001 Major League Baseball season
