= 2000 California League season =

- League: California League
- Sport: Baseball
- Duration: April 6 – September 3
- Games: 140
- Teams: 10

Regular season
- League champions: Lancaster JetHawks
- Season MVP: Juan Silvestre, Lancaster JetHawks

Playoffs
- League champions: San Bernardino Stampede
- Runners-up: Visalia Oaks

CALL seasons
- ← 1999 2001 →

The 2000 California League was a Class A-Advanced baseball season played between April 6 and September 3. Ten teams played a 140-game schedule, as three teams from each division qualified for the post-season, the winner of each half of the season plus playoff qualifiers.

The San Bernardino Stampede won the California League championship, as they defeated the Visalia Oaks in the final round of the playoffs.

== Team changes ==
- The Stockton Ports were renamed to the Mudville Nine. The club remained affiliated with the Milwaukee Brewers.

== Teams ==
2000 California League
Division	Team	City	MLB Affiliate	Stadium
North	Bakersfield Blaze	Bakersfield, California	San Francisco Giants	Sam Lynn Ballpark
North	Modesto A's	Modesto, California	Oakland Athletics	John Thurman Field
North	Mudville Nine	Stockton, California	Milwaukee Brewers	Billy Hebert Field
North	San Jose Giants	San Jose, California	San Francisco Giants	San Jose Municipal Stadium
North	Visalia Oaks	Visalia, California	Oakland Athletics	Recreation Park
South	High Desert Mavericks	Adelanto, California	Arizona Diamondbacks	Maverick Stadium
South	Lake Elsinore Storm	Lake Elsinore, California	Anaheim Angels	Lake Elsinore Diamond
South	Lancaster JetHawks	Lancaster, California	Seattle Mariners	The Hangar
South	Rancho Cucamonga Quakes	Rancho Cucamonga, California	San Diego Padres	Rancho Cucamonga Epicenter
South	San Bernardino Stampede	San Bernardino, California	Los Angeles Dodgers	Arrowhead Credit Union Park

== Map of teams ==
North Division South Division

== Regular season ==
=== Summary ===
- The Lancaster JetHawks finished with the best record in the regular season for the first time in team history.

=== Standings ===
North Division
Team	Win	Loss	%	GB
Bakersfield Blaze	80	60	.571	–
Visalia Oaks	78	62	.557	2
Modesto A's	76	64	.543	4
Mudville Nine	68	72	.486	12
San Jose Giants	53	87	.379	27
South Division
Team	Win	Loss	%	GB
Lancaster JetHawks	89	51	.636	–
San Bernardino Stampede	77	63	.550	12
Lake Elsinore Storm	70	70	.500	19
Rancho Cucamonga Quakes	61	79	.436	28
High Desert Mavericks	48	92	.343	41

== League Leaders ==
=== Batting leaders ===
Stat	Player	Total
AVG	Terrmel Sledge, Lancaster JetHawks	.339
H	Joe Thurston, San Bernardino Stampede	167
R	Craig Kuzmic, Lancaster JetHawks	106
2B	Graham Koonce, Rancho Cucamonga Quakes	40
3B	Elpidio Guzman, Lake Elsinore Storm	16
HR	Juan Silvestre, Lancaster JetHawks	30
RBI	Juan Silvestre, Lancaster JetHawks	137
SB	Esteban Germán, Visalia Oaks	78

=== Pitching leaders ===
Stat	Player	Total
W	Carlos García, San Bernardino Stampede; Jeff Heaverlo, Lancaster JetHawks; Joe Horgan, San Jose Giants	14
ERA	Carlos García, San Bernardino Stampede	2.57
CG	Brandon Emanuel, Lake Elsinore Storm; Carlos García, San Bernardino Stampede; John Lackey, Lake Elsinore Storm	2
SHO	Carlos García, San Bernardino Stampede; John Lackey, Lake Elsinore Storm; Wayne Nix, Visalia Oaks; Mario Ramos, Modesto A's	1
SV	Jason Bullard, Bakersfield Blaze	30
IP	Carlos García, San Bernardino Stampede	182.0
SO	Jason Childers, Mudville Nine; Juan Peña, Modesto A's	177

== Playoffs ==
- The San Bernardino Stampede won their second consecutive, and third overall California League championship, as they defeated the Visalia Oaks in three games.

=== Playoff bracket ===
Division semi-finals
N1	Modesto	bye
N2	Bakersfield	1
N3	Visalia	2
S1	Lancaster	bye
S2	San Bernardino	2
S3	Lake Elsinore	0

Division finals
N1	Modesto	2
N3	Visalia	3
S1	Lancaster	2
S2	San Bernardino	3

Finals
N3	Visalia	0
S2	San Bernardino	3

== Awards ==
California League awards
Award name	Recipient
Most Valuable Player	Juan Silvestre, Lancaster JetHawks

== See also ==
- 2000 Major League Baseball season
