= 2002 California League season =

- League: California League
- Sport: Baseball
- Duration: April 4 – September 1
- Games: 140
- Teams: 10

Regular season
- League champions: Stockton Ports
- Season MVP: Rocco Baldelli, Bakersfield Blaze

Playoffs
- League champions: Stockton Ports
- Runners-up: Lake Elsinore Storm

CALL seasons
- ← 2001 2003 →

The 2002 California League was a Class A-Advanced baseball season played between April 4 and September 1. Ten teams played a 140-game schedule, as three teams from each division qualified for the post-season, the winner of each half of the season plus playoff qualifiers.

The Stockton Ports won the California League championship, as they defeated the Lake Elsinore Storm in the final round of the playoffs.

== Team changes ==
- The Mudville Nine are renamed to the Stockton Ports. The club continued their affiliation with the Cincinnati Reds.

== Teams ==
2002 California League
Division	Team	City	MLB Affiliate	Stadium
North	Bakersfield Blaze	Bakersfield, California	Tampa Bay Devil Rays	Sam Lynn Ballpark
North	Modesto A's	Modesto, California	Oakland Athletics	John Thurman Field
North	San Jose Giants	San Jose, California	San Francisco Giants	San Jose Municipal Stadium
North	Stockton Ports	Stockton, California	Cincinnati Reds	Billy Hebert Field
North	Visalia Oaks	Visalia, California	Oakland Athletics	Recreation Park
South	High Desert Mavericks	Adelanto, California	Milwaukee Brewers	Maverick Stadium
South	Lake Elsinore Storm	Lake Elsinore, California	San Diego Padres	Lake Elsinore Diamond
South	Lancaster JetHawks	Lancaster, California	Arizona Diamondbacks	The Hangar
South	Rancho Cucamonga Quakes	Rancho Cucamonga, California	Anaheim Angels	Rancho Cucamonga Epicenter
South	San Bernardino Stampede	San Bernardino, California	Seattle Mariners	Arrowhead Credit Union Park

== Map of teams ==
North Division South Division

== Regular season ==
=== Summary ===
- The Stockton Ports finished with the best record in the regular season for the first time since 1992.
- The Visalia Oaks defeated the Bakersfield Blaze in a tie-breaking game to clinch the third playoff position in the North Division.

=== Standings ===
North Division
Team	Win	Loss	%	GB
Stockton Ports	89	51	.636	–
Modesto A's	78	62	.557	11
Visalia Oaks	70	71	.496	19.5
Bakersfield Blaze	69	72	.489	20.5
San Jose Giants	68	72	.486	21
South Division
Team	Win	Loss	%	GB
San Bernardino Stampede	77	63	.550	–
Lake Elsinore Storm	75	65	.536	2
Lancaster JetHawks	63	77	.450	14
High Desert Mavericks	60	80	.429	17
Rancho Cucamonga Quakes	52	88	.371	25

== League Leaders ==
=== Batting leaders ===
Stat	Player	Total
AVG	Jon Knott, Lake Elsinore Storm	.341
H	José López, San Bernardino Stampede	169
R	Jonny Gomes, Bakersfield Blaze	102
2B	José López, San Bernardino Stampede	39
3B	Dave Krynzel, High Desert Mavericks	12
HR	Jorge Soto, Visalia Oaks	31
RBI	Jesús Cota, Lancaster JetHawks	101
SB	Marcus Nettles, Lake Elsinore Storm	58

=== Pitching leaders ===
Stat	Player	Total
W	Russ Morgan, San Bernardino Stampede; Ryan Mottl, Stockton Ports	13
ERA	Jeff Clark, San Jose Giants	2.06
CG	Rich Fischer, Rancho Cucamonga Quakes	5
SHO	Rich Fischer, Rancho Cucamonga Quakes	4
SV	Jared Hoerman, San Bernardino Stampede	29
IP	Ryan Mottl, Stockton Ports	180.0
SO	Clint Nageotte, San Bernardino Stampede	214

== Playoffs ==
- The Stockton Ports won their tenth California League championship, as they defeated the Lake Elsinore Storm in four games.

=== Playoff bracket ===
Division semi-finals
N1	Stockton	bye
N2	Modesto	2
N3	Visalia	0
S1	San Bernardino	bye
S2	Lake Elsinore	2
S3	Lancaster	0

Division finals
N1	Stockton	3
N2	Modesto	0
S1	San Bernardino	2
S2	Lake Elsinore	3

Finals
N1	Stockton	3
S2	Lake Elsinore	1

== Awards ==
California League awards
Award name	Recipient
Most Valuable Player	Rocco Baldelli, Bakersfield Blaze

== See also ==
- 2002 Major League Baseball season
