= 1997 California League season =

- League: California League
- Sport: Baseball
- Duration: April 3 – August 31
- Games: 140
- Teams: 10

Regular season
- League champions: High Desert Mavericks
- Season MVP: Mike Stoner, High Desert Mavericks

Playoffs
- League champions: High Desert Mavericks
- Runners-up: San Bernardino Stampede

CALL seasons
- ← 1996 1998 →

The 1997 California League was a Class A-Advanced baseball season played between April 3 and August 31. Ten teams played a 140-game schedule, as three teams from each division qualified for the post-season, the winner of each half of the season plus playoff qualifiers.

The High Desert Mavericks won the California League championship, as they defeated the San Bernardino Stampede in the final round of the playoffs.

== League changes ==
- The league realigned their divisions from the North Division and South Division to the Freeway Division and the Valley Division.

== Team changes ==
- The Bakersfield Blaze began a new affiliation with the San Francisco Giants.
- The High Desert Mavericks ended their affiliation with the Baltimore Orioles and began a new affiliation with the Arizona Diamondbacks.
- The Visalia Oaks ended their affiliation with the Detroit Tigers and began a new affiliation with the Oakland Athletics.

== Teams ==
1997 California League
Division	Team	City	MLB Affiliate	Stadium
Freeway	Bakersfield Blaze	Bakersfield, California	San Francisco Giants	Sam Lynn Ballpark
Freeway	Lake Elsinore Storm	Lake Elsinore, California	Anaheim Angels	Lake Elsinore Diamond
Freeway	Rancho Cucamonga Quakes	Rancho Cucamonga, California	San Diego Padres	Rancho Cucamonga Epicenter
Freeway	San Bernardino Stampede	San Bernardino, California	Los Angeles Dodgers	Arrowhead Credit Union Park
Freeway	Visalia Oaks	Visalia, California	Oakland Athletics	Recreation Park
Valley	High Desert Mavericks	Adelanto, California	Arizona Diamondbacks	Maverick Stadium
Valley	Lancaster JetHawks	Lancaster, California	Seattle Mariners	The Hangar
Valley	Modesto A's	Modesto, California	Oakland Athletics	John Thurman Field
Valley	San Jose Giants	San Jose, California	San Francisco Giants	San Jose Municipal Stadium
Valley	Stockton Ports	Stockton, California	Milwaukee Brewers	Billy Hebert Field

== Map of teams ==
Freeway Division Valley Division

== Regular season ==
=== Summary ===
- The High Desert Mavericks finished with the best record in the regular season for the first time since 1993.
- The Lancaster JetHawks defeated the Modesto A's in a tie-breaking game to clinch the playoff qualifier position in the Valley Division.

=== Standings ===
Freeway Division
Team	Win	Loss	%	GB
Rancho Cucamonga Quakes	77	63	.550	–
Visalia Oaks	71	69	.507	6
San Bernardino Stampede	68	72	.486	9
Bakersfield Blaze	62	78	.443	15
Lake Elsinore Storm	61	79	.436	16
Valley Division
Team	Win	Loss	%	GB
High Desert Mavericks	83	57	.593	–
Lancaster JetHawks	75	66	.532	8.5
Modesto A's	74	67	.525	9.5
Stockton Ports	70	70	.500	13
San Jose Giants	60	80	.429	23

== League Leaders ==
=== Batting leaders ===
Stat	Player	Total
AVG	Ramón Hernández, Visalia Oaks	.361
H	Mike Stoner, High Desert Mavericks	203
R	Mike Stoner, High Desert Mavericks	115
2B	Mike Stoner, High Desert Mavericks	44
3B	Joe Mathis, Lancaster JetHawks	15
HR	Stan Cameron, High Desert Mavericks; Mike Glendenning, Bakersfield Blaze; Mike Stoner, High Desert Mavericks	33
RBI	Mike Stoner, High Desert Mavericks	142
SB	Justin Baughman, Lake Elsinore Storm	68

=== Pitching leaders ===
Stat	Player	Total
W	J. J. Pearsall, San Bernardino Stampede; Jeff Sobkoviak, High Desert Mavericks	14
ERA	Ted Lilly, San Bernardino Stampede	2.81
CG	Mick Fieldbinder, Stockton Ports	4
SHO	Stevenson Agosto, Lake Elsinore / Rancho Cucamonga; Kelly Wunsch, Stockton Ports	2
SV	Mick Pageler, Bakersfield Blaze	29
IP	Bill Malloy, Bakersfield Blaze	167.1
SO	Jason Brester, San Jose Giants	172

== Playoffs ==
- The High Desert Mavericks won their third California League championship, as they defeated the San Bernardino Stampede in three games.

=== Playoff bracket ===
Division semi-finals
F1	Rancho Cucamonga	bye
F2	San Bernardino	2
F3	Visalia	0
V1	High Desert	bye
V2	Stockton	1
V3	Lancaster	2

Division finals
F1	Rancho Cucamonga	2
F2	San Bernardino	3
V1	High Desert	3
V3	Lancaster	0

Finals
F2	San Bernardino	0
V1	High Desert	3

== Awards ==
California League awards
Award name	Recipient
Most Valuable Player	Mike Stoner, High Desert Mavericks

== See also ==
- 1997 Major League Baseball season
