= 1999 California League season =

- League: California League
- Sport: Baseball
- Duration: April 8 – September 5
- Games: 140
- Teams: 10

Regular season
- League champions: Modesto A's
- Season MVP: Chin-Feng Chen, San Bernardino Stampede

Playoffs
- League champions: San Bernardino Stampede
- Runners-up: San Jose Giants

CALL seasons
- ← 1998 2000 →

The 1999 California League was a Class A-Advanced baseball season played between April 8 and September 5. Ten teams played a 140-game schedule, as three teams from each division qualified for the post-season, the winner of each half of the season plus playoff qualifiers.

The San Bernardino Stampede won the California League championship, as they defeated the San Jose Giants in the final round of the playoffs.

== League changes ==
- The California League realigned their divisions from the Freeway Division and Valley Division to the North Division and the South Division. Each division would have five teams.

== Teams ==
1999 California League
Division	Team	City	MLB Affiliate	Stadium
North	Bakersfield Blaze	Bakersfield, California	San Francisco Giants	Sam Lynn Ballpark
North	Modesto A's	Modesto, California	Oakland Athletics	John Thurman Field
North	San Jose Giants	San Jose, California	San Francisco Giants	San Jose Municipal Stadium
North	Stockton Ports	Stockton, California	Milwaukee Brewers	Billy Hebert Field
North	Visalia Oaks	Visalia, California	Oakland Athletics	Recreation Park
South	High Desert Mavericks	Adelanto, California	Arizona Diamondbacks	Maverick Stadium
South	Lake Elsinore Storm	Lake Elsinore, California	Anaheim Angels	Lake Elsinore Diamond
South	Lancaster JetHawks	Lancaster, California	Seattle Mariners	The Hangar
South	Rancho Cucamonga Quakes	Rancho Cucamonga, California	San Diego Padres	Rancho Cucamonga Epicenter
South	San Bernardino Stampede	San Bernardino, California	Los Angeles Dodgers	Arrowhead Credit Union Park

== Map of teams ==
North Division South Division

== Regular season ==
=== Summary ===
- The Modesto A's finished with the best record in the regular season for the first time since 1994.

=== Standings ===
North Division
Team	Win	Loss	%	GB
Modesto A's	88	52	.629	–
Visalia Oaks	75	65	.536	13
San Jose Giants	75	65	.536	13
Bakersfield Blaze	64	76	.457	24
Stockton Ports	57	83	.407	31
South Division
Team	Win	Loss	%	GB
San Bernardino Stampede	80	61	.567	–
Rancho Cucamonga Quakes	76	64	.543	3.5
High Desert Mavericks	68	73	.482	12
Lake Elsinore Storm	63	77	.450	16.5
Lancaster JetHawks	55	85	.393	24.5

== League Leaders ==
=== Batting leaders ===
Stat	Player	Total
AVG	Eric Byrnes, Modesto A's	.337
H	Robb Gorr, San Bernardino Stampede	174
R	Jermaine Clark, Lancaster JetHawks	112
2B	Jason Hart, Modesto A's	48
3B	Oscar Salazar, Modesto A's	18
HR	Jack Cust, High Desert Mavericks	32
RBI	Chin-Feng Chen, San Bernardino Stampede; Jason Hart, Modesto A's; Todd Mensik, Visalia Oaks	123
SB	Nelson Castro, Lake Elsinore Storm	53

=== Pitching leaders ===
Stat	Player	Total
W	Marcos Castillo, San Bernardino Stampede; Randey Dorame, San Bernardino Stampede; Rick Guttormson, Rancho Cucamonga Quakes	14
ERA	Randey Dorame, San Bernardino Stampede	2.51
CG	Steve Fish, Lake Elsinore Storm; Paul Stewart, Stockton Ports	5
SHO	Steve Green, Lake Elsinore Storm	4
SV	Bill Everly, San Bernardino Stampede	34
IP	Steve Fish, Lake Elsinore Storm	196/2
SO	Steve Fish, Lake Elsinore Storm	180

== Playoffs ==
- The San Bernardino Stampede won their second California League championship, as they defeated the San Jose Giants in five games.

=== Playoff bracket ===
Division semi-finals
N1	Modesto	bye
N2	Visalia	1
N3	San Jose	2
S1	Rancho Cucamonga	bye
S2	San Bernardino	2
S3	Lake Elsinore	0

Division finals
N1	Modesto	2
N3	San Jose	3
S1	Rancho Cucamonga	2
S2	San Bernardino	3

Finals
N3	San Jose	2
S2	San Bernardino	3

== Awards ==
California League awards
Award name	Recipient
Most Valuable Player	Chin-Feng Chen, San Bernardino Stampede

== See also ==
- 1999 Major League Baseball season
