= 1998 California League season =

- League: California League
- Sport: Baseball
- Duration: April 2 – August 30
- Games: 140
- Teams: 10

Regular season
- League champions: San Jose Giants
- Season MVP: Brad Penny, High Desert Mavericks

Playoffs
- League champions: San Jose Giants
- Runners-up: Rancho Cucamonga Quakes

CALL seasons
- ← 1997 1999 →

The 1998 California League was a Class A-Advanced baseball season played between April 2 and August 30. Ten teams played a 140-game schedule, as three teams from each division qualified for the post-season, the winner of each half of the season plus playoff qualifiers.

The San Jose Giants won the California League championship, as they defeated the Rancho Cucamonga Quakes in the final round of the playoffs.

== Teams ==
1998 California League
Division	Team	City	MLB Affiliate	Stadium
Freeway	Bakersfield Blaze	Bakersfield, California	San Francisco Giants	Sam Lynn Ballpark
Freeway	Lake Elsinore Storm	Lake Elsinore, California	Anaheim Angels	Lake Elsinore Diamond
Freeway	Rancho Cucamonga Quakes	Rancho Cucamonga, California	San Diego Padres	Rancho Cucamonga Epicenter
Freeway	San Bernardino Stampede	San Bernardino, California	Los Angeles Dodgers	Arrowhead Credit Union Park
Freeway	Visalia Oaks	Visalia, California	Oakland Athletics	Recreation Park
Valley	High Desert Mavericks	Adelanto, California	Arizona Diamondbacks	Maverick Stadium
Valley	Lancaster JetHawks	Lancaster, California	Seattle Mariners	The Hangar
Valley	Modesto A's	Modesto, California	Oakland Athletics	John Thurman Field
Valley	San Jose Giants	San Jose, California	San Francisco Giants	San Jose Municipal Stadium
Valley	Stockton Ports	Stockton, California	Milwaukee Brewers	Billy Hebert Field

== Map of teams ==
Freeway Division Valley Division

== Regular season ==
=== Summary ===
- The San Jose Giants finished with the best record in the regular season for the first time since 1996.

=== Standings ===
Freeway Division
Team	Win	Loss	%	GB
Rancho Cucamonga Quakes	77	63	.550	–
Visalia Oaks	67	73	.479	10
Lake Elsinore Storm	66	74	.471	11
San Bernardino Stampede	55	85	.393	22
Bakersfield Blaze	49	91	.350	28
Valley Division
Team	Win	Loss	%	GB
San Jose Giants	83	57	.593	–
High Desert Mavericks	82	58	.586	1
Lancaster JetHawks	78	62	.557	5
Modesto A's	77	63	.550	6
Stockton Ports	66	74	.471	17

== League Leaders ==
=== Batting leaders ===
Stat	Player	Total
AVG	Brendan Kingman, Lancaster JetHawks	.340
H	Cirilo Cruz, Lancaster JetHawks	170
R	Jason Regan, Lancaster JetHawks	105
2B	Cirilo Cruz, Lancaster JetHawks; Adam Piatt, Modesto A's	40
3B	John Adams, High Desert Mavericks; Brian McClure, Rancho Cucamonga Quakes	11
HR	Tim Flaherty, Bakersfield Blaze; A. J. Leday, Rancho Cucamonga Quakes	24
RBI	Adam Piatt, Modesto A's	107
SB	Ramon Moreta, San Bernardino Stampede	46

=== Pitching leaders ===
Stat	Player	Total
W	Brad Penny, High Desert Mavericks	14
ERA	Luke Prokopec, San Bernardino Stampede	2.69
CG	Allen Levrault, Stockton Ports	4
SV	Jim Stoops, San Jose Giants	31
IP	José García, Stockton Ports	169.1
SO	Brad Penny, High Desert Mavericks	207

== Playoffs ==
- The San Jose Giants won their fourth California League championship, as they defeated the Rancho Cucamonga Quakes in four games.

=== Playoff bracket ===
Division semi-finals
F1	Rancho Cucamonga	bye
F2	Visalia	0
F3	Lake Elsinore	2
V1	San Jose	bye
V2	High Desert	2
V3	Lancaster	0

Division finals
F1	Rancho Cucamonga	3
F3	Lake Elsinore	0
V1	San Jose	3
V2	High Desert	2

Finals
F1	Rancho Cucamonga	1
V1	San Jose	3

== Awards ==
California League awards
Award name	Recipient
Most Valuable Player	Brad Penny, High Desert Mavericks

== See also ==
- 1998 Major League Baseball season
