= 1996 California League season =

- League: California League
- Sport: Baseball
- Duration: April 4 – September 1
- Games: 140
- Teams: 10

Regular season
- League champions: San Jose Giants
- Season MVP: D. T. Cromer, Modesto A's

Playoffs
- League champions: Lake Elsinore Storm
- Runners-up: San Jose Giants

CALL seasons
- ← 1995 1997 →

The 1996 California League was a Class A-Advanced baseball season played between April 4 and September 1. Ten teams played a 140-game schedule, as three teams from each division qualified for the post-season, the winner of each half of the season plus playoff qualifiers.

The Lake Elsinore Storm won the California League championship, as they defeated the San Jose Giants in the final round of the playoffs.

== Team changes ==
- The Riverside Pilots are relocated to Lancaster, California and are renamed to the Lancaster JetHawks. The club remained affiliated with the Seattle Mariners.
- The San Bernardino Spirit are renamed to the San Bernardino Stampede. The club remained affiliated with the Los Angeles Dodgers.
- The Visalia Oaks began an affiliation with the Detroit Tigers.

== Teams ==
1996 California League
Division	Team	City	MLB Affiliate	Stadium
North	Bakersfield Blaze	Bakersfield, California	None	Sam Lynn Ballpark
North	Modesto A's	Modesto, California	Oakland Athletics	John Thurman Field
North	San Jose Giants	San Jose, California	San Francisco Giants	San Jose Municipal Stadium
North	Stockton Ports	Stockton, California	Milwaukee Brewers	Billy Hebert Field
North	Visalia Oaks	Visalia, California	Detroit Tigers	Recreation Park
South	High Desert Mavericks	Adelanto, California	Baltimore Orioles	Maverick Stadium
South	Lake Elsinore Storm	Lake Elsinore, California	California Angels	Lake Elsinore Diamond
South	Lancaster JetHawks	Lancaster, California	Seattle Mariners	The Hangar
South	Rancho Cucamonga Quakes	Rancho Cucamonga, California	San Diego Padres	Rancho Cucamonga Epicenter
South	San Bernardino Stampede	San Bernardino, California	Los Angeles Dodgers	Arrowhead Credit Union Park

== Map of teams ==
North Division South Division

== Regular season ==
=== Summary ===
- The San Jose Giants finished with the best record in the regular season for the first time since 1991.

=== Standings ===
North Division
Team	Win	Loss	%	GB
San Jose Giants	89	51	.636	–
Modesto A's	82	58	.586	7
Stockton Ports	79	61	.564	10
Visalia Oaks	50	90	.357	39
Bakersfield Blaze	39	101	.279	50
South Division
Team	Win	Loss	%	GB
High Desert Mavericks	76	64	.543	–
Lake Elsinore Storm	75	65	.536	1
Lancaster JetHawks	71	69	.507	5
San Bernardino Stampede	70	70	.500	6
Rancho Cucamonga Quakes	69	71	.493	7

== League Leaders ==
=== Batting leaders ===
Stat	Player	Total
AVG	Mike Berry, High Desert Mavericks	.361
H	Tim Garland, San Jose Giants	171
R	Dave Roberts, Visalia Oaks	112
2B	Joe Erso, Lake Elsinore Storm	47
3B	Shane Monahan, Lancaster JetHawks	12
HR	Chris Kirgan, High Desert Mavericks	35
RBI	Chris Kirgan, High Desert Mavericks	131
SB	Dave Roberts, Visalia Oaks	65

=== Pitching leaders ===
Stat	Player	Total
W	Darin Blood, San Jose Giants	17
ERA	Darin Blood, San Jose Giants	2.65
CG	Igor Oropeza, Bakersfield Blaze	4
SHO	Darin Blood, San Jose Giants	2
SV	Rich Linares, San Bernardino Stampede	33
IP	Steve Woodard, Stockton Ports	181.1
SO	Darin Blood, San Jose Giants	193

== Playoffs ==
- The Lake Elsinore Storm won their first California League championship, as they defeated the San Jose Giants in five games.

=== Playoff bracket ===
Division semi-finals
N1	San Jose	bye
N2	Modesto	0
N3	Stockton	2
S1	High Desert	bye
S2	Rancho Cucamonga	0
S3	Lake Elsinore	2

Division finals
N1	San Jose	3
N3	Stockton	1
S1	High Desert	0
S3	Lake Elsinore	3

Finals
N1	San Jose	2
S3	Lake Elsinore	3

== Awards ==
California League awards
Award name	Recipient
Most Valuable Player	D. T. Cromer, Modesto A's

== See also ==
- 1996 Major League Baseball season
