= Monzon =

Monzon may refer to:

== People ==
- Bernardo Alvarado Monzón (fl. 1972), Guatemalan communist leader
- Carlos Monzón (1942–1995), Argentine middleweight boxer
- Christian Monzon (born 1977), American actor and model
- Dan Monzon (1946–1996), American baseball player, manager, and scout
- Elfego Hernán Monzón Aguirre, Guatemalan president
- Erick Monzón (born 1981), Puerto Rican baseball player
- Fabián Monzón (born 1987), Argentine football player
- Gastón Monzón (born 1987), Argentine football player
- Monzon Diarra (fl. 1795–1808), ruler of the Bambara Empire in Mali
- Pedro Monzón (born 1962), Argentine football player and coach
- Roberto Monzón (born 1978), Cuban Olympic wrestler
- Telesforo Monzón (1904–1981), Basque writer and politician
- Tina Monzon-Palma (born 1951), Filipina anchorwoman
- Víctor Hugo Monzón (born 1957), Guatemalan football player and coach

== Places ==
- County of Monzón, a marcher county of the Kingdom of León in the tenth and eleventh centuries
- Monzón, a town in Huesca Province, Spain
  - Monzón Castle
- Monzón de Campos, a municipality in Palencia Province, Spain
- Monzón District, Huamalíes Province, Peru

== Other uses ==
- Monzonite, an intermediate igneous rock
