= 66ers =

66ers is the team name of:

- Inland Empire 66ers of San Bernardino, a minor league baseball team based in San Bernardino, California
- Tulsa 66ers, an NBA Development League franchise based in Tulsa, Oklahoma
