= Erick Monzón =

Long Island Ducks – No. --
- Utility player
- Born: November 30, 1981 (age 44); San Juan, Puerto Rico
- Bats: Right Throws: Right
- Stats at Baseball Reference

Erick Joel Monzón (born November 30, 1981, in San Juan, Puerto Rico) is a Minor League Baseball second baseman who plays for the Long Island Ducks. He was signed as a non-drafted free agent May 22, 2004 by Mariners scout Mark Leavitt. Monzón attended the University of Tampa.

== Professional career ==
=== Seattle Mariners ===
Monzón began his pro career with the Peoria Mariners in 2004, appearing in three games. He was soon promoted to the Inland Empire 66ers on June 25. There he delivered 11 multi-hit games, including two with multiple home runs. Later that season, he was placed on the disabled list from August 23 to September 17 with a strain left knee. He finished the season with a .346 batting average, seven home runs, and 21 RBIs in 34 combined games.

In 2005 Monzón spent his season with the 66rs. He hit .271 with 13 home runs and 49 RBIs in 94 games. He again found himself on the disabled list with a torn right hamstring after running the bases.

Starting the season with Inland Empire, Monzón soon found himself promoted to the Double-A San Antonio Missions where he hit .245 in 78 games. He was transferred to the Triple-A Tacoma Rainiers on July 4 and back to San Antonio on July 12. His combined season totals was an average of .250 with five home runs and 48 RBIs. Monzón faced Roger Clemens in one of Clemens' rehab starts at the Double-A level. Monzón got a single off of Clemens.

In 2007 Monzón was promoted to the Double-A West Tenn Diamond Jaxx. This is where he spent his entire season, batting .222 with six home runs and 30 RBIs in 68 games. He was again on the disabled list with a strained left hamstring, from April 15 to May 3.

The 2008 season greeted Monzón with a demotion to the High Desert Mavericks, but he was soon promoted to Double-A. He had a combined batting average of .204 with five home runs and 30 RBIs. This was Monzón's worst season statistically.

Monzón began the 2009 season with West Tennessee but was soon promoted to Tacoma. He finished the season with a combined .226 average with four doubles, five home runs and 15 RBIs.
