= Gastón Monzón =

Argentine footballer

Personal information
- Full name: Gastón Monzón
- Date of birth: May 13, 1987 (age 39)
- Place of birth: Buenos Aires, Argentina
- Height: 1.84 m (6 ft 0 in)
- Position: Goalkeeper

Team information
- Current team: Fénix

Youth career
- Huracán

Senior career*
Years	Team	Apps	(Gls)
2007–2014	Huracán	127	(0)
2014–2015	San Marcos de Arica	3	(0)
2015–2016	Tristán Suárez	7	(0)
2016–2017	Deportivo Armenio	37	(0)
2017–2018	Excursionistas	11	(0)
2018–2019	General Lamadrid	12	(0)
2019	San Martín Burzaco	7	(0)
2019–2020	Ferrocarril Midland	4	(0)
2021	Dock Sud	5	(0)
2022–	Fénix	2	(0)
- * Club domestic league appearances and goals as of 1 June 2022

Gastón Monzón (born May 13, 1987, in Buenos Aires) is an Argentine football goalkeeper.

== Career ==
A native of Buenos Aires, Monzón (also known as Torta) began playing football with local side Club Atlético Huracán. He was the club's primary goalkeeper from 2007 to 2014. A move to San Marcos de Arica in Chile that was marred by injury followed.

After he retired from playing, Monzón became a goalkeeping coach. He made a surprise Primera B Metropolitana appearance for Club Atlético Fénix during the 2022 tournament, when the club's starting and reserve goalkeepers were unavailable due to injury. Club Comunicaciones capitalized on a Monzón error en route to a 2–1 victory over Fénix.
