= Fiscalini Field =

Stadium in San Bernardino, California, US

- Coyotes Den
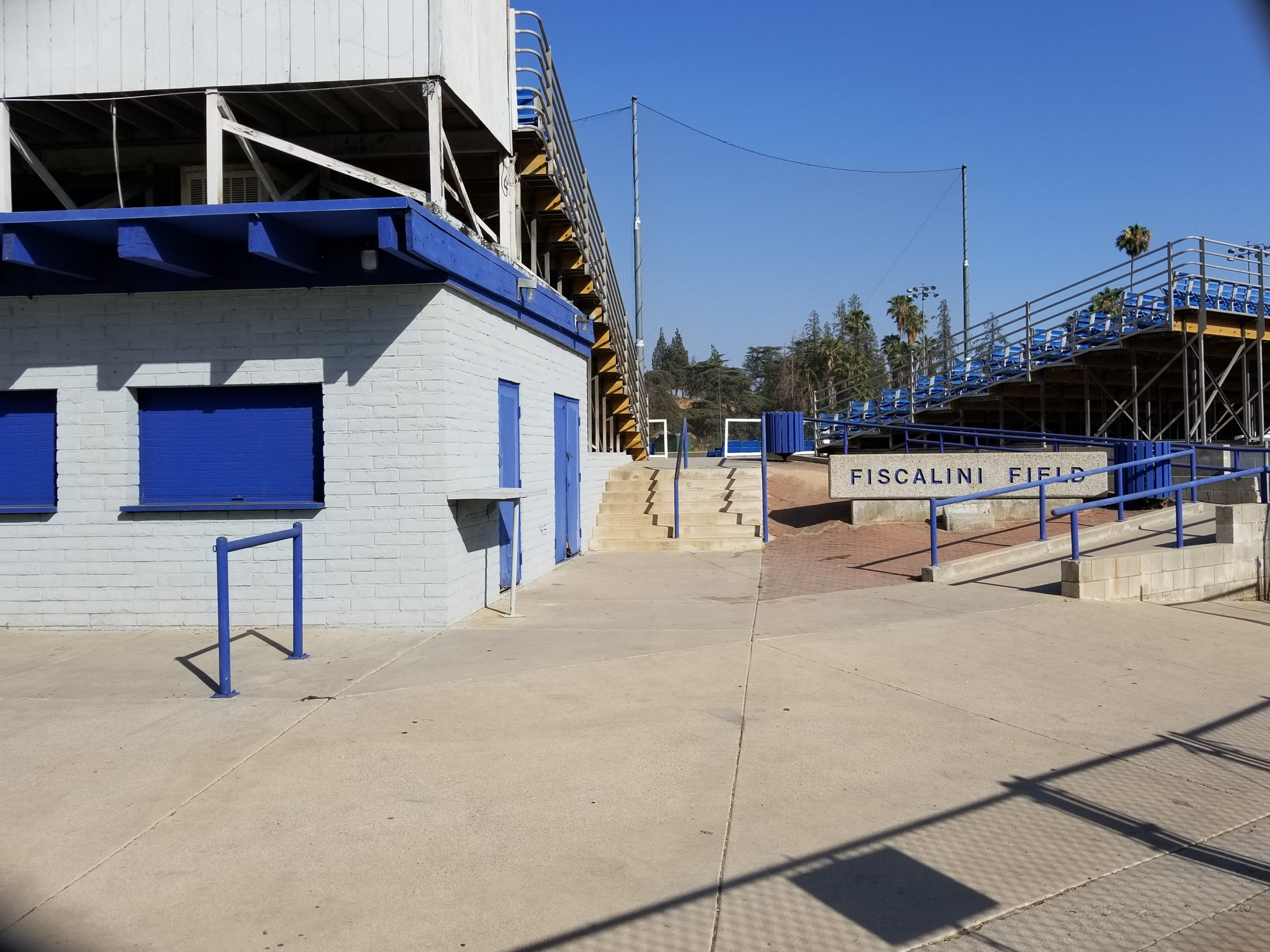
- Interactive map of Fiscalini Field
- Former names: Perris Hill Park
- Location: 1007 East Highland Avenue; San Bernardino, California 92404, United States
- Coordinates: 34.13541°N 117.263799°W
- Capacity: 3,500
- Surface: Grass

Construction
- Opened: 1934
- Renovated: 1993

Tenants
- NCAA; California State University, San Bernardino (2010–present); MLB Spring Training; Pittsburgh Pirates (NL) (1935, 1937–1942, 1946, 1949–1952); St. Louis Browns (AL) (1948, 1953); Minor League; San Bernardino Stars (CAL) (1941); San Bernardino Pioneers (Sun) (1946–1947); San Bernardino Spirit (CAL) (1987–1995)

Fiscalini Field is a stadium in San Bernardino, California, US. Over the years, the stadium was the spring training homes of the Pittsburgh Pirates and St. Louis Browns (now the Baltimore Orioles) and was the home field for the San Bernardino Stars, the San Bernardino Spirit, and the San Bernardino Pioneers. Today, Fiscalini Field is used for NCAA Division II college baseball games hosted by California State University, San Bernardino. Community college baseball games featuring San Bernardino Valley College are also played there plus San Bernardino Youth Baseball Pony league the rest of the year.

== History ==
The park was originally built in 1934, and named Perris Hill Park after Fredrick Thomas Perris, a Santa Fe Railroad developer who helped shape early San Bernardino. In 1993, the baseball field was renamed Fiscalini Field after the late John Fiscalini, a San Bernardino native, who earned All-Citrus Belt League baseball honors at San Bernardino High School, won All-American Laurel twice while playing at the University of California at Berkeley and played professionally in the minor leagues for the Pittsburgh Pirates of the National League. He did not make it to the majors and retired in 1950.

== Today ==
The field is primarily used for baseball and was the home of San Bernardino Spirit prior to San Manuel Stadium (then known as The Ranch) opening in 1996. The CSUSB and San Bernardino Youth baseball baseball teams currently play there. Adult league games are played on the field from June to September. CSUSB starts on September In preparation for collegiate season. Games are played on Friday and all day Saturdays and Sundays. There are currently two different levels of Pony League play: Colt and palomino Pony divisions.

== Gallery ==
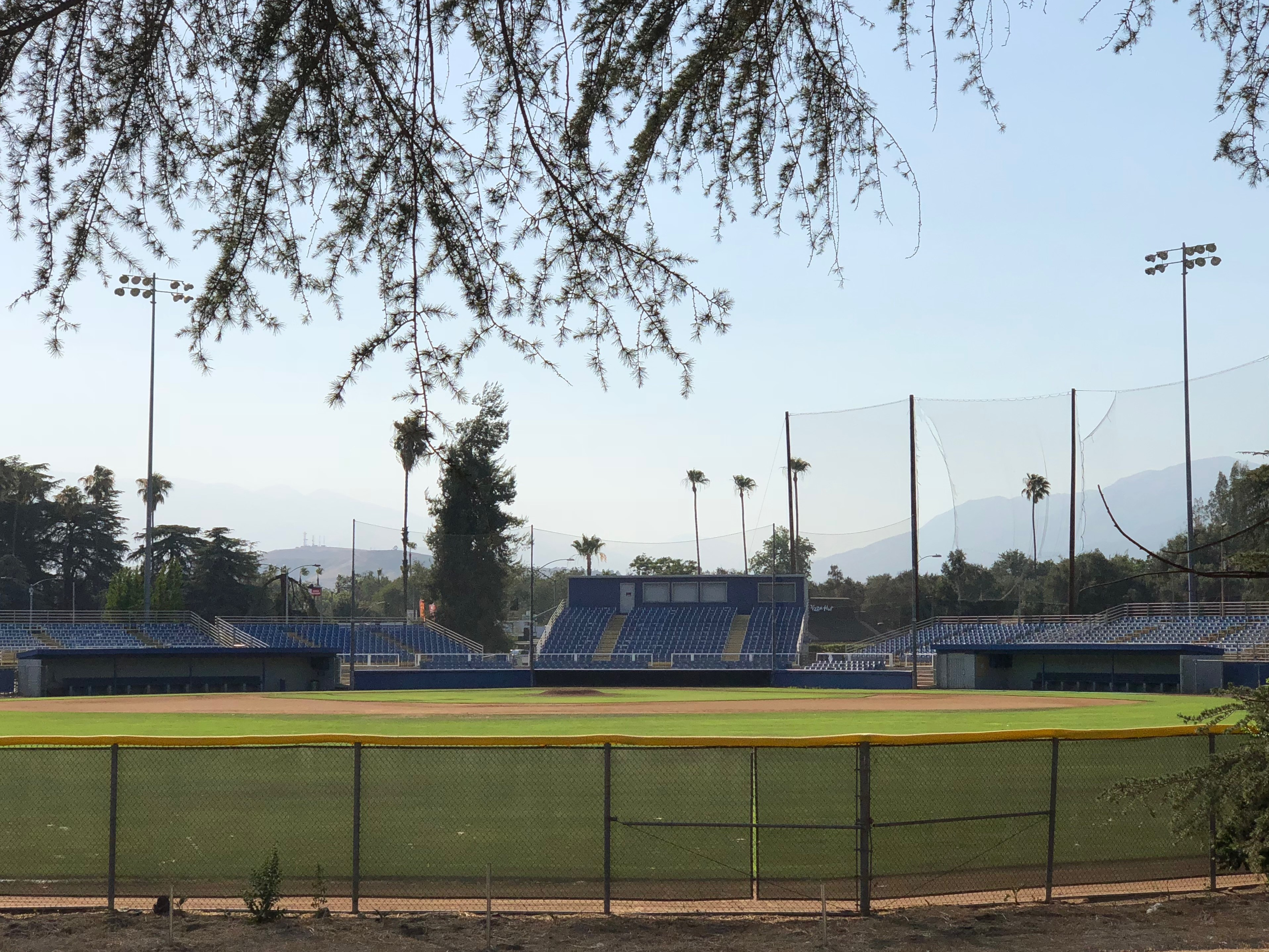
Fiscalini Field grandstand

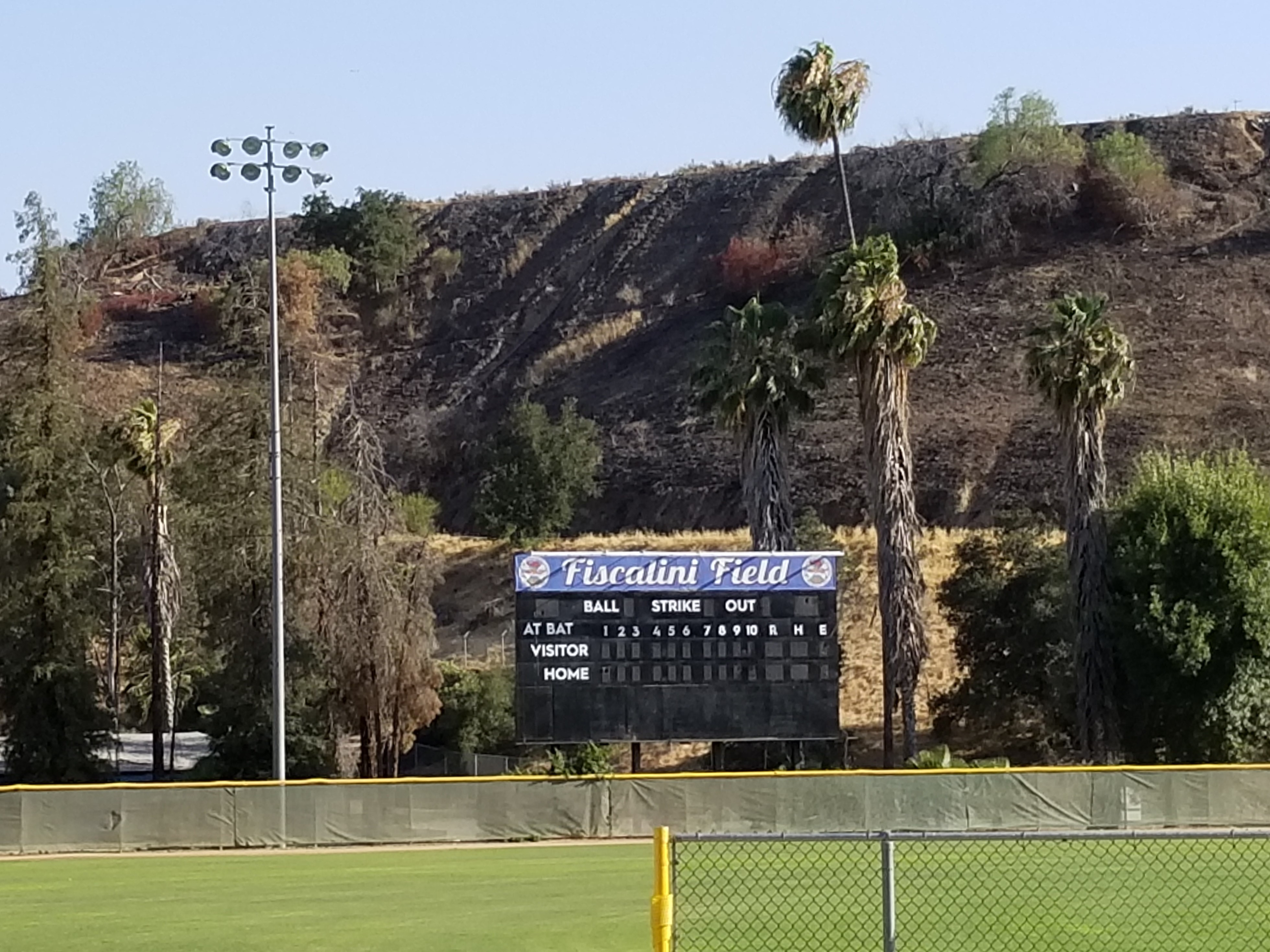
Fiscalini Field scoreboard
