= Morongo Field =

Baseball stadium in Rancho Cucamonga, California

Morongo Field at The Epicenter
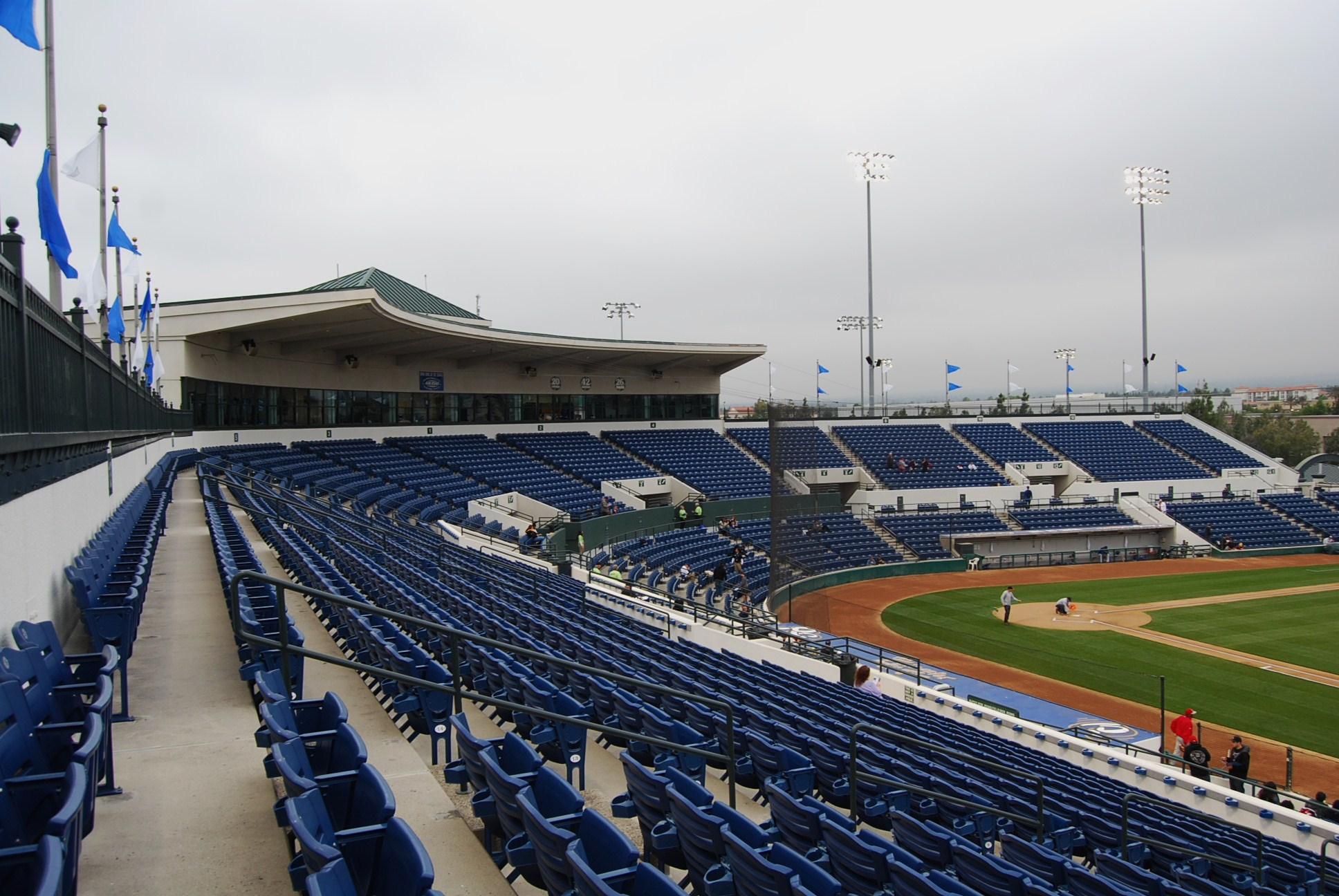
- The seating area of the stadium
- Interactive map of Morongo Field at The Epicenter
- Former names: Rancho Cucamonga Stadium; City of Rancho Cucamonga Epicenter Entertainment & Sports Complex (until 2013) LoanMart Field (2013-2025)
- Location: 8408 Rochester Avenue; Rancho Cucamonga, CA 91730
- Coordinates: 34.102765°N 117.54797°W
- Owner: City of Rancho Cucamonga
- Operator: City of Rancho Cucamonga
- Capacity: 6,588 permanent stadium seats
- Surface: Grass
- Field size: Left Field - 330 ft Left-Center Power Alley - 373 ft Center Field - 401 ft Right-Center Power Alley - 373 ft Right Field - 330 ft Backstop - 50 ft
- Public transit: Rancho Cucamonga

Construction
- Groundbreaking: November 14, 1991
- Opened: April 3, 1993
- Cost: $20 million ($44.6 million in 2025 dollars)
- Architect: Grillias-Pirc-Rosier-Alves
- General contractors: Bernards Brothers, Inc.

Tenant
- Rancho Cucamonga Quakes (1993–present)

Morongo Field at The Epicenter is a stadium in Rancho Cucamonga, California. It is primarily used for baseball and is the home field of the Rancho Cucamonga Quakes minor league baseball team. It was opened on April 3, 1993, with the nickname The Epicenter, and has a seating capacity of 6,588 people. While playing at the stadium since 1993, the Quakes have broken a number of stadium attendance records.

== History ==
=== Construction ===
In 1992, the San Bernardino Spirit were playing at Fiscalini Field, when it was announced that a new ballpark would be built in Rancho Cucamonga for over $20 million. At the time, this was a large amount of money to spend on a new minor league ballpark. The Spirit (soon renamed the Quakes) jumped at the chance to play in this new ballpark and moved in 1993, switching their affiliation from the Seattle Mariners to the San Diego Padres.

Construction started on November 14, 1991, with much of the staff for the Quakes moving into trailers on the outskirts of the construction site. The process used 400 trucks of concrete, and over 95,000 cubic yards of dirt were moved. Officially named "The Quakes," the stadium was then nicknamed the "Epicenter." The team moved into the stadium on April 1, 1993.

=== Early seasons ===
The Rancho Cucamonga Quakes played their first game at the stadium on April 8 against the High Desert Mavericks, winning 7-3. Early demand for tickets was high, and on May 22, over 440 temporary bleacher seats were added to the stadium. By July, the team broke the California League attendance record of 218,444, ending the season with a record of 331,005, fourth of any Class-A team in the country, and better than any Class AA team that year. After that season, more seats were installed in the outfield area, bringing capacity over 6,000. After a championship win in 1994, attendance went up in 1995, with the team playing to a 97% filled capacity that year. In 1996, the Quakes again topped the attendance rate in the league for the fourth season in a row.

=== Recent years ===
After the completion of the 2009 season, the Quakes baseball team was sold to Brett Sports & Entertainment. In 2011 the team Quakes began a partnership with the Los Angeles Dodgers. As of 2014, the stadium's property encompasses a 52-acre sports complex. Its close proximity to the film studios of Los Angeles means a number of movies have been filmed there, and the stadium has also hosted concerts, non-baseball sporting events, vehicle shows and exhibitions, community events and festivals.

=== LoanMart ===
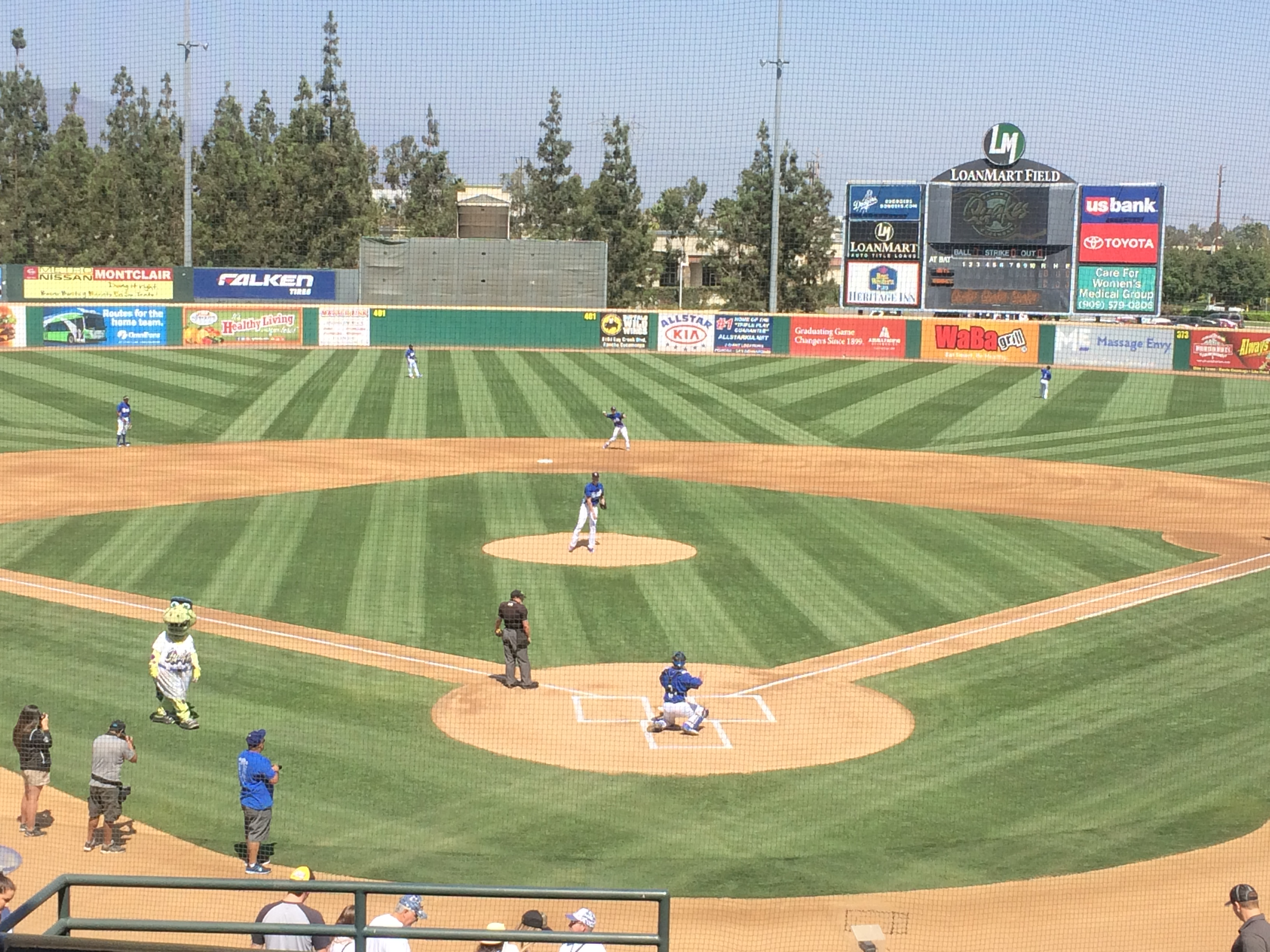
Rancho Cucamonga Quakes vs Modesto Nuts at LoanMart Field on September 5, 2016

On April 3, 2013, it was announced that LoanMart had signed a 10-year sponsorship and naming rights deal with the franchise, renaming the ballpark LoanMart Field. Founded in 2002, 1-800LoanMart is a direct financer and lending company based in Encino.

Other sponsors of the stadium and team beyond LoanMart include Allstar KIA, Budweiser, the California National Guard, Pepsi, and many other diverse companies.

== Improvements ==
2008–2009

Between the 2008 and 2009 seasons, the existing seats were replaced, with the old seats recycled, sealing all the cracks and holes in the concrete around the entire stadium, and installing the new and improved seats into place. There are no changes in the capacity for the stadium. However, the numbers on the first base side (sections 3, 5, 7, 9, 11, 13 and 15) are numbered differently from before. The sections now have the number one on the right when facing the field and the largest number of the row on the left when facing the field. The new seats are navy blue and are equipped with a cup holder for each seat. The lower levels, Super Box and Field Box, are now padded.

2011–present

Prior to the 2012 season, the stadium's home and away clubhouses underwent major renovations to meet Minor League Baseball standards. The home clubhouse was renamed the Tommy Lasorda Clubhouse on March 28, 2013, before the start of a special exhibition game between the Quakes and their MLB affiliate, the Los Angeles Dodgers.

During the offseason leading up to the 2013 season, the stadium's left field bleachers were removed in favor of the Batting Cage Terrace, where fans can watch players take batting practice in an open batting cage adjacent to the home bullpen. During the games, fans have the opportunity to take abbreviated batting practice rotations.
