= Rancho Cucamonga Quakes =

- Founded in 1966; Rancho Cucamonga, California

Team logo	Cap insignia

Minor league affiliations
- Class: Single-A (2021–present)
- Previous classes: Class A-Advanced (1966–2020)
- League: California League (1966–present)
- Conference: South Division

Major league affiliations
- Team: Los Angeles Angels (2001-2010; 2026–present): San Diego Padres (1970-1971; 1993-2000); Seattle Mariners (1987-1992); Toronto Blue Jays (1985-1986); Los Angeles Dodgers (1976-1983; 2011-2025); Baltimore Orioles (1972-1975); Oakland Athletics (1969); Chicago Cubs (1966-1968; 1984)

Minor league titles
- League titles (3): 1994; 2015; 2018
- Division titles (10): 1994; 1997; 1998; 2010; 2011; 2015; 2018; 2019; 2021; 2023
- First-half titles (2): 2023; 2025

Team data
- Name: Rancho Cucamonga Quakes (1993–present)
- Previous names: (see list)
- Mascots: Tremor and Aftershock
- Ballpark: LoanMart Field (1993–present)
- Previous parks: Fiscalini Field; Lawrence Park
- Owner/ Operator: Diamond Baseball Holdings
- General manager: Abbie Lawson
- Manager: Dave Stapleton
- Website: milb.com/rancho-cucamonga

The Rancho Cucamonga Quakes are a Minor League Baseball team of the California League and the Single-A affiliate of the Los Angeles Angels. They are located in Rancho Cucamonga, California, and play their home games at LoanMart Field.

The franchise was founded in Lodi, California, in 1966 as members of the California League, with its home ballpark as Tony Zupo Field. The team then went through several new names and ownership changes before arriving in Rancho Cucamonga in 1993. In the 2021 reorganization of the minor leagues, the California League disbanded and was replaced by the Low-A-West, but this was renamed the California League in 2022.

The Quakes have three California League championships (1994, 2015, and 2018).

== History ==
=== Early years ===
The Quakes franchise began in 1966 in Lodi, California as the Lodi Crushers after a team of investors from the city pooled together $2,500 a few years earlier. Until 1984, the team played at Lawrence Park (now Tony Zupo Field) for home games. Several times in its early history, the team was sold from one group of collaborating town residents to another. Since 1966, the franchise has been affiliated with several major league teams, notably the Los Angeles Dodgers in the late 1970s and the Chicago Cubs in the early 1980s. While in Lodi, the team won several California League Championships, including 1973, 1977 and 1981.

After 1984, the Chicago Cubs pulled out of Lodi, and the franchise's owner Michelle Sprague was unable to find a major league affiliate. She deactivated the team for a year, selling the team to a group including former L.A. Dodger Ken McMullen. After spending time in Ventura, under new ownership (a group of investors including Roy Englebrecht, actor Mark Harmon, and former Quakes' majority owner Hank Stickney), the team moved to San Bernardino in 1987 and became the San Bernardino Spirit. Ken Griffey Jr. was among the players that came through Fiscalini Field on their way to the big leagues.

=== Move to Rancho Cucamonga ===
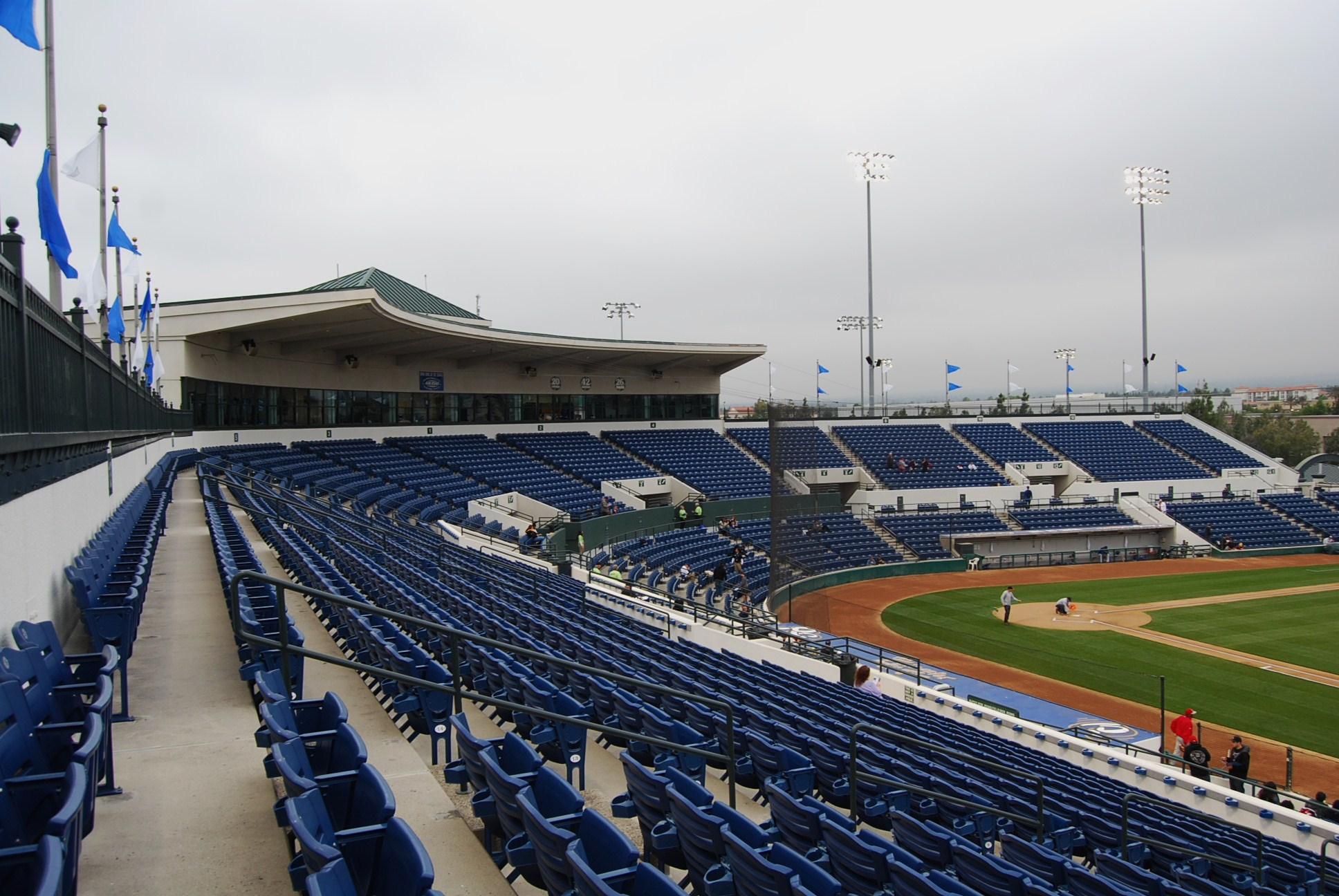
The team plays their games at LoanMart Field, and has since 1993

In the early 1990s, Stickney was informed by the city of Rancho Cucamonga that they would be breaking ground on a new stadium. Selling the rights to the name "The San Bernardino Spirit" to a different franchise, the main staff of Stickney's team moved outside the construction zone where the ballpark would be built. Construction started on November 14, 1991. Named "The Quake" after a vote, the stadium was nicknamed the "Epicenter". The team moved into the stadium on April 1, 1993. The Rancho Cucamonga Quakes played their first game at the stadium on April 8 against the High Desert Mavericks, winning 7–3. The Quakes won their first California League championship in 1994, defeating the Modesto A's in four games.

The Quakes continue to play their home games at the stadium, now renamed LoanMart Field. The stadium held up to 7000 fans in its first few years of existence, but renovations in 2014 and 2015 reduced its capacity to just over 4900 total fans. During the late 1990s and 2000s, the Quakes broke several league attendance records.

After being an affiliate of the San Diego Padres for the first eight years in Rancho Cucamonga, the team swapped affiliations with the Lake Elsinore Storm, beginning the 2001 season. For the next ten seasons, the Quakes were affiliated with the Los Angeles Angels of Anaheim. In 2010, its final year of affiliation with the Angels, the team advanced to the California League championship round, losing in extra innings in the fifth and deciding game to the San Jose Giants. After the season, the Quakes once again changed affiliations, joining the Dodgers' system.

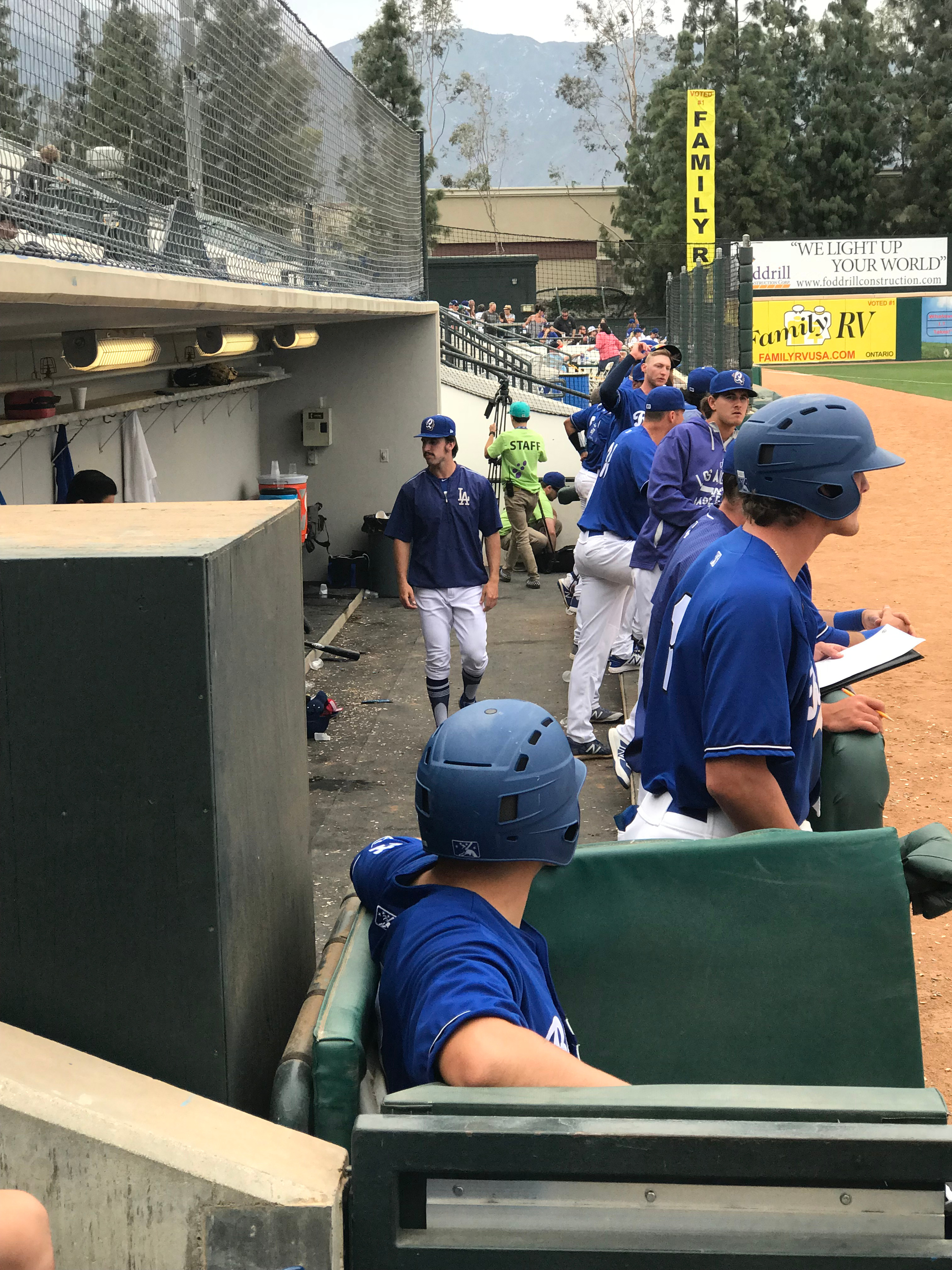
The 2018 Quakes in their dugout at LoanMart Field

Television actor Mark Harmon (St. Elsewhere, NCIS) was one of the team's owners until he sold his interest in the team to local businessman Scott Ostlund. Since 2009, the team has been owned and operated by Brett Sports and Entertainment, headed by former Kansas City Royals Hall of Famer George Brett and his brother Bobby Brett.

In conjunction with Major League Baseball's restructuring of Minor League Baseball in 2021, the Quakes were organized into the Low-A West at the Low-A classification. In 2022, the Low-A West became known as the California League, the name historically used by the regional circuit prior to the 2021 reorganization, and was reclassified as a Single-A circuit.

=== Relocation and reboot of franchise ===
The Quakes organization moved to a new 6,000 seat stadium in the Ontario Ranch section of Ontario and changed their name to the Ontario Tower Buzzers in 2026. However, the City of Rancho Cucamonga added a new Minor League Baseball affiliate at LoanMart Field under the name Quakes.

On December 12, 2024, it was announced the Quakes would continue in 2026 and beyond, with the team switching affiliates with the Inland Empire 66ers, assuming an affiliation with the Los Angeles Angels, at that time. The move consisted of the current Quakes franchise relocating to Ontario, the current 66ers franchise assuming the location and identity of the Quakes, and a relocated Modesto Nuts team assuming the 66ers location and identity. In effect, it made the move a de facto relocation of the Modesto Nuts franchise, rather than the Quakes franchise. The team was sold to Diamond Baseball Holdings, which will own all three teams, as well as two other teams in the eight-team California League.

== Branding, media ==
The mascot of the Rancho Cucamonga Quakes is Tremor, the "Rallysaurus".

Joe Castellano was the team's first play-by-play announcer; he later moved on to the Triple-A Rochester Red Wings, and now works for XM Satellite Radio on the MLB Home Plate channel. The Quakes are currently in their second year with their current broadcast partner, IE NewsTalk 1290 with Mike Lindskog calling the play-by-play. NewsTalk 1290 is owned by iHeartMedia, Inc.. It airs a talk radio format for the Inland Empire region of Southern California including Riverside and San Bernardino..

== Past team names ==
- Lodi Crushers (1966–1969)
- Lodi Padres (1970–1971)
- Lodi Orions (1972)
- Lodi Lions (1973)
- Lodi Orioles (1974–1975)
- Lodi Dodgers (1976–1983)
- Lodi Crushers (1984)
- Ventura County Gulls (1986)
- San Bernardino Spirit (1987–1992)

== Past major league affiliations ==
- Chicago Cubs (1966–1968, 1984)
- Oakland Athletics (1969)
- San Diego Padres (1970–1971)
- Baltimore Orioles (1972–1975)
- Los Angeles Dodgers (1976–1983; 2011–2025)
- Toronto Blue Jays (1985-1986)
- Seattle Mariners (1987–1992)
- San Diego Padres (1993–2000)
- Los Angeles Angels (2001–2010, 2026–present)

== Notable Quakes alumni ==
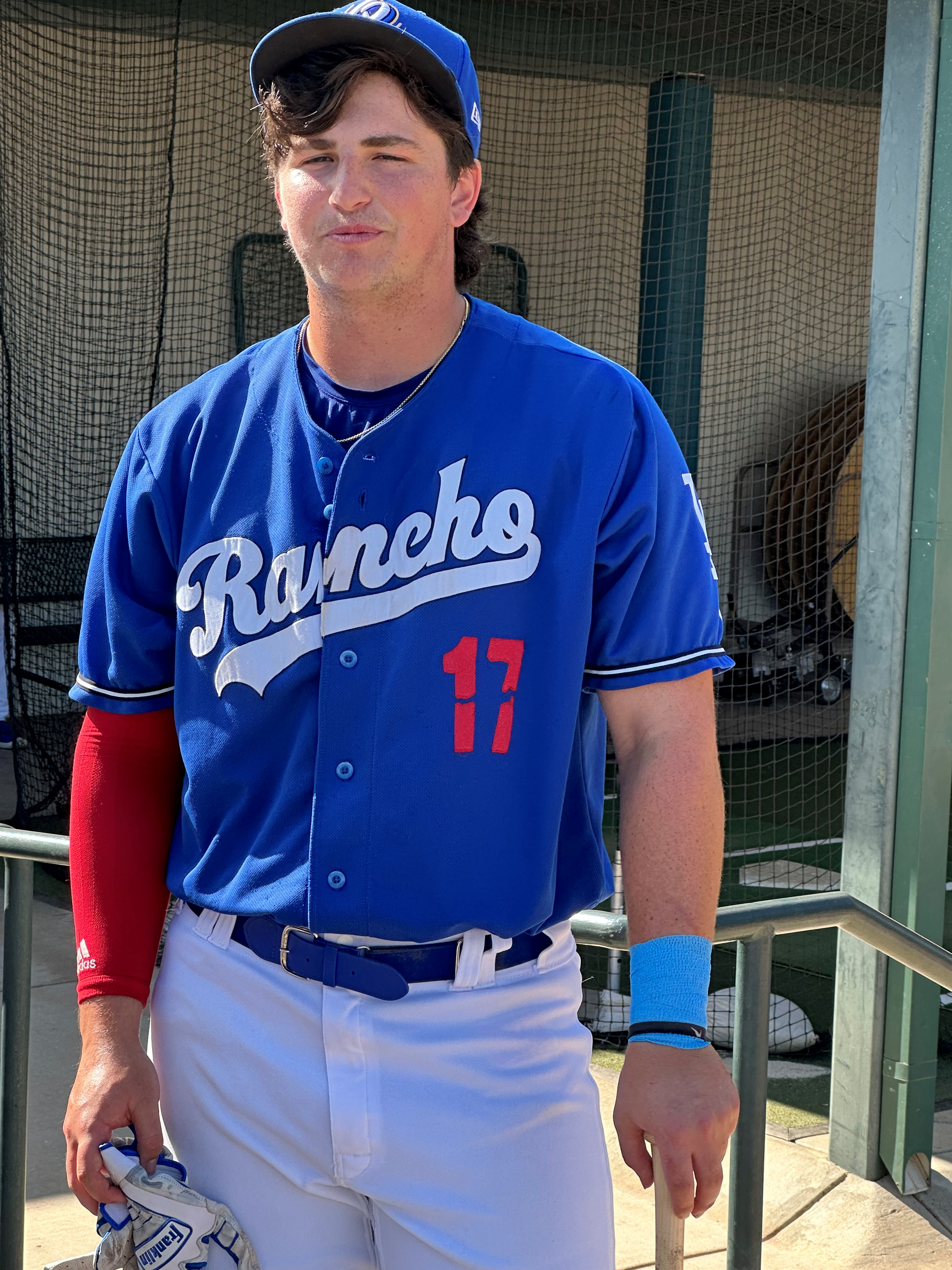
Jake Gelof

Dean Kremer with the Quakes

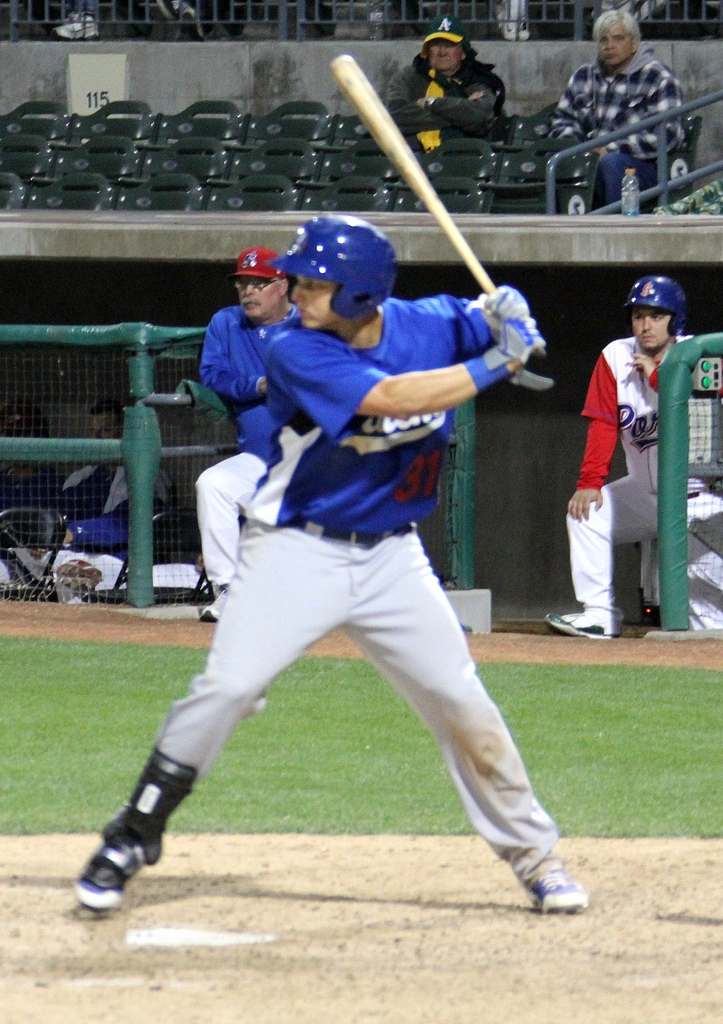
Joc Pederson with the Quakes

- Erick Aybar
- Cody Bellinger
- Peter Bourjos
- Walker Buehler
- Jeter Downs
- Jake Gelof
- Tony Gonsolin
- Vladimir Guerrero
- Marcus Harvey
- Bobby Jenks
- Matt Kemp
- Howie Kendrick
- Dean Kremer
- Derrek Lee
- Gavin Lux
- Dustin May
- Kendrys Morales
- Mike Napoli
- Wil Nieves
- Joc Pederson
- Yasiel Puig
- Francisco Rodríguez
- Bubby Rossman
- Ervin Santana
- Joe Saunders
- Corey Seager
- Will Smith
- Mike Trout
- Mark Trumbo
- Julio Urias
- Fernando Valenzuela
- Jordan Walden
- Jered Weaver

== Roster ==
Rancho Cucamonga Quakes roster
Players	Coaches/Other
Pitchers: 27 Jose Atencio; 57 Derek Clark; 25 Alton Davis II; 44 Victor Garcia; 36 Will Gervase; 24 Trey Gregory-Alford; 12 Jakob Guardado; 46 Talon Haley; 23 Dylan Jordan; 18 Ben Joyce #*; 10 Fulton Lockhart; 41 Nicolo Pinazzi; 48 Yokelvin Reyes; 18 Angelo Smith; 32 Ubaldo Soto; 52 Brayan Vergara; 38 Jaren Warwick; Catchers: 28 Gabriel Davalillo; 13 Jonathan Linares; 56 Marlon Quintero; Infielders: 17 Slate Alford; 14 Kendrey Maduro; 54 Anyelo Marquez; 4 Felix Morrobel; 49 John Wimmer; 43 Ryland Zaborowski; Outfielders: 3 Hayden Alvarez; 7 Kevyn Castillo; 6 Jonny McGill; 5 Lucas Ramirez	Manager: 22 Dave Stapleton; Coaches: 45 Elmer Dessens (pitching); 15 Raywilly Gomez (hitting); -- Steven Hernandez (coach); 9 Dioner Navarro (coach); 60-day injured list: -- Barrett Kent (full season); -- Jesus Martinez; 7-day injured list; * On Los Angeles Angels 40-man roster; ~ Development list; # Rehab assignment; ∞ Reserve list; ‡ Restricted list; § Suspended list; † Temporarily inactive list; Roster updated June 5, 2026; Transactions; → More rosters: MiLB • California League; → Los Angeles Angels minor league players

=== Player gallery ===
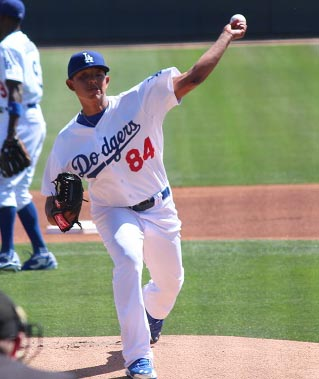
Julio Urías joined the team in 2014

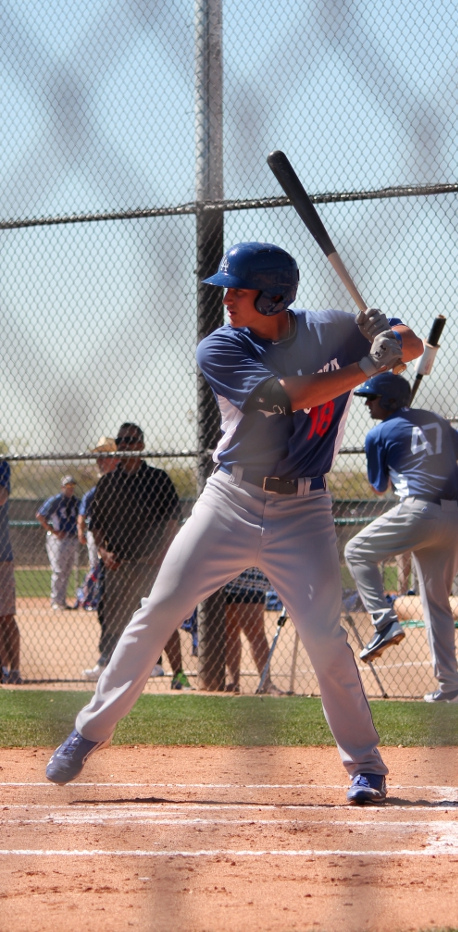
Corey Seager

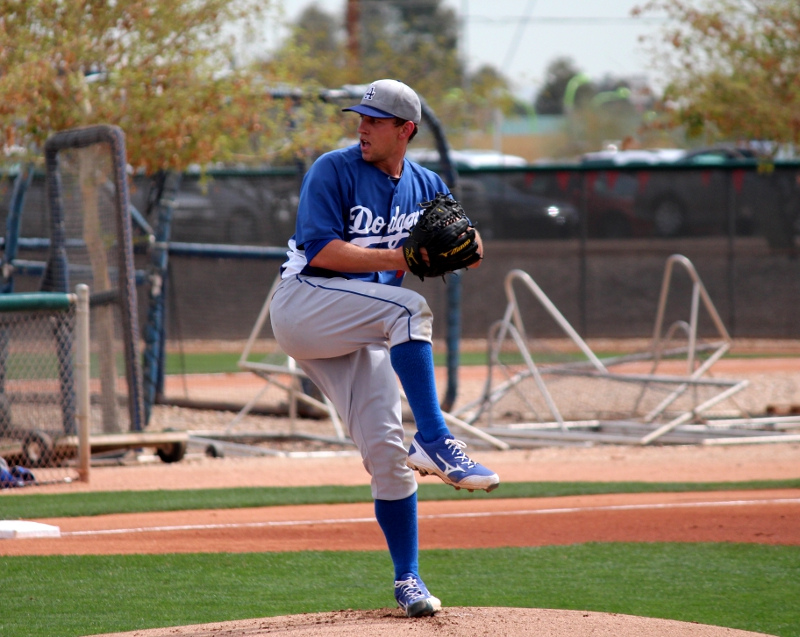
Aaron Miller

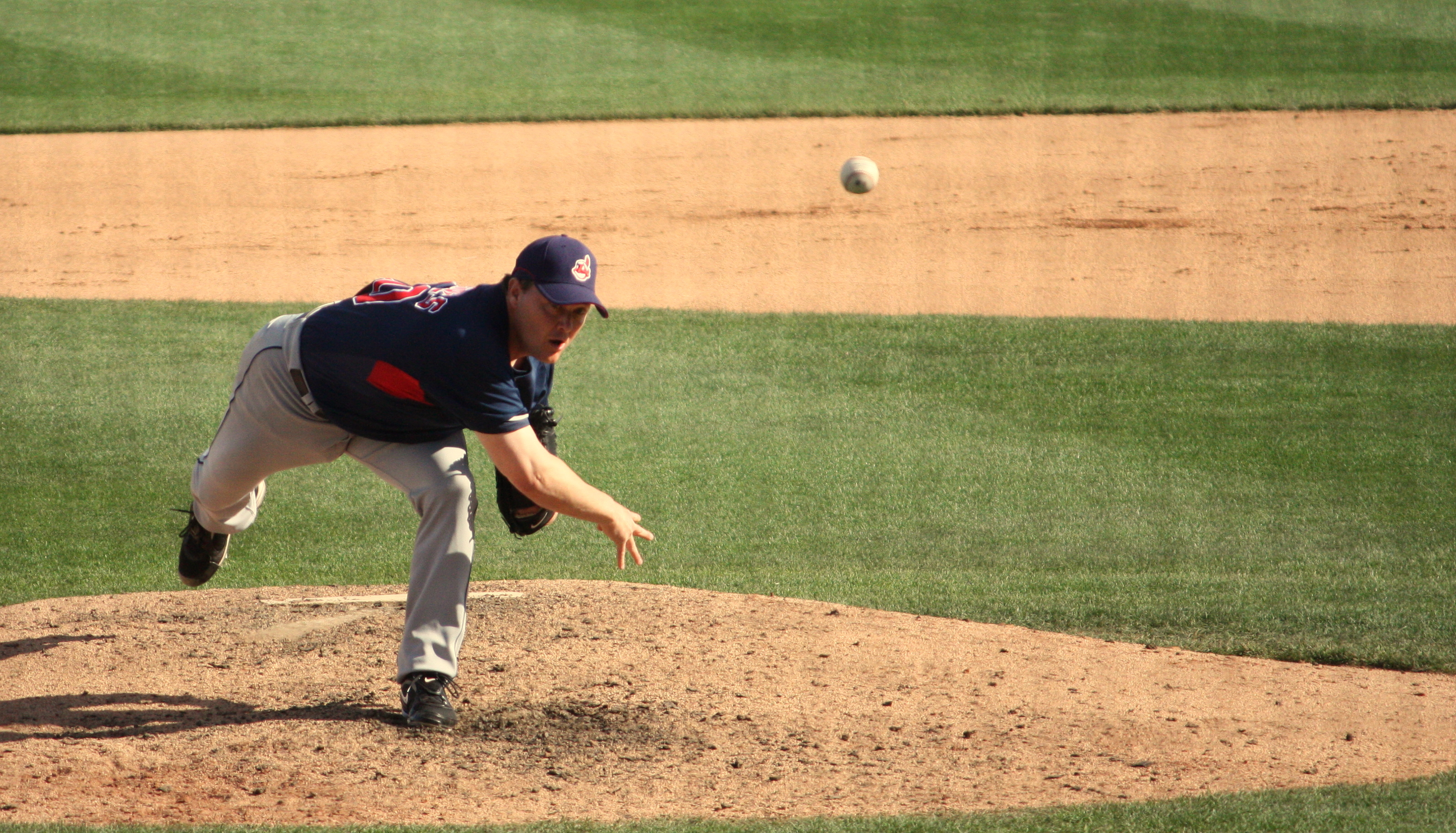
Matt Herges the pitching coach
