= San Manuel Stadium =

Baseball stadium in San Bernardino, California

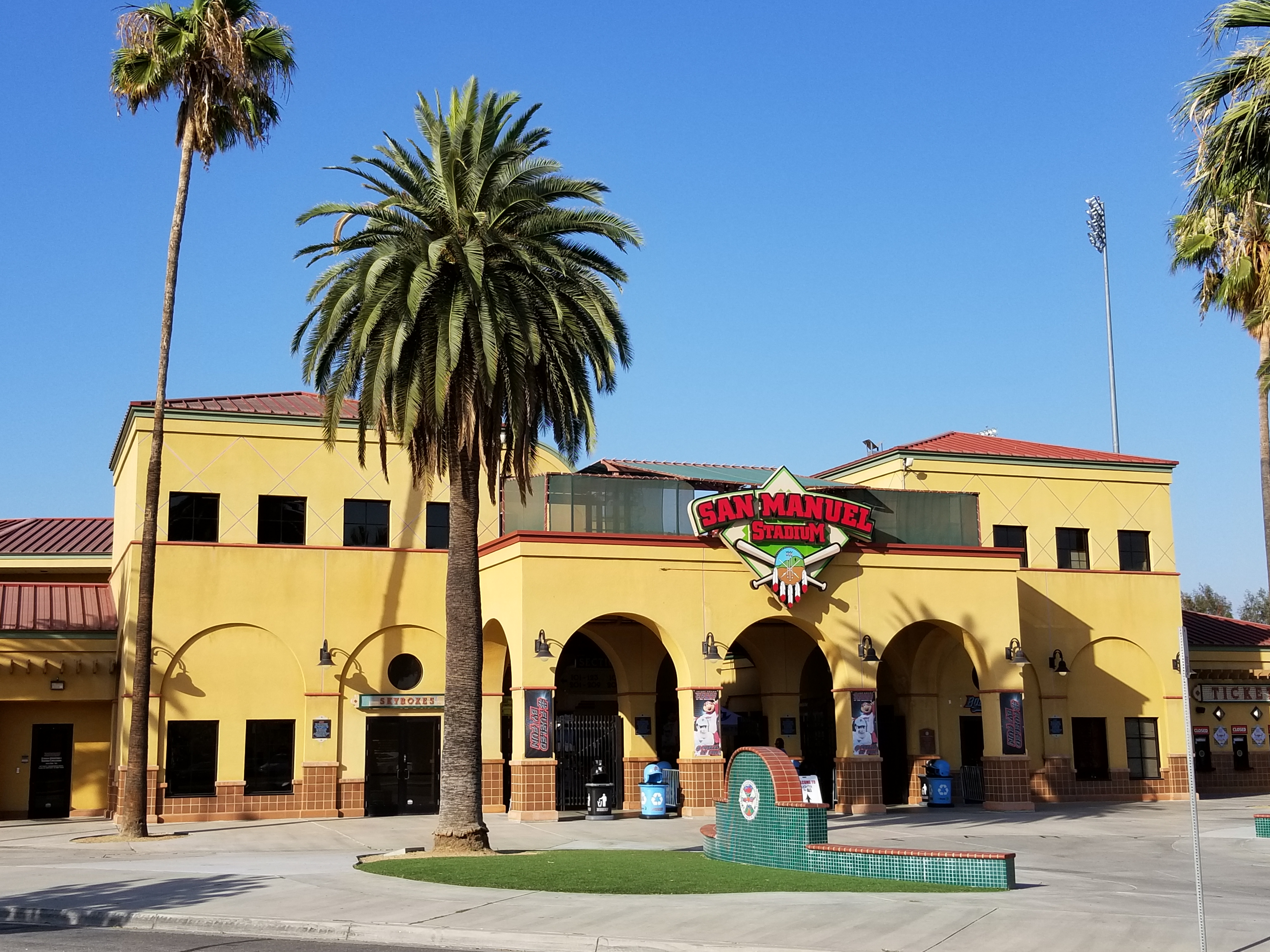
- Interactive map of San Manuel Stadium
- Former names: Arrowhead Credit Union Park; San Bernardino Stadium; The Ranch
- Location: 280 South E Street; San Bernardino, California 92410
- Coordinates: 34°5′50″N 117°17′43″W
- Owner: Elmore Sports Group
- Operator: Elmore Sports Group
- Capacity: 8,000
- Surface: Grass
- Field size: Left Field - 330 ft Left-Center Power Alley - ? ft Center Field - 410 ft Right-Center Power Alley - ? ft Right Field - 330 ft Backstop - 50 ft

Construction
- Groundbreaking: September 1995
- Opened: August 26, 1996
- Cost: $17 million ($34.9 million in 2025 dollars)
- Architect: Populous
- General contractor: Matich Corporation

Tenants
- Inland Empire 66ers (CL) (1996–present); Cal State San Bernardino Coyotes (NCAA) (1996–2009); Los Angeles Unity (Pro Cricket) (2004)

San Manuel Stadium is an open-air ballpark in downtown San Bernardino, California, United States. It opened in 1996, replacing Fiscalini Field as the home park of Minor League Baseball's Inland Empire 66ers of San Bernardino. Before then, the 66ers shared Fiscalini Field with CSUSB Coyotes and SBVC Wolverines. San Manuel Stadium is named after the San Manuel Band of Mission Indians, which is based in San Bernardino and paid for the naming rights. The stadium seats 8,000 people, with additional capacity provided by lawn seating.

It is located directly next to the San Bernardino Transit Center, with connections to Los Angeles Union Station.

== History ==
San Manuel Stadium was also the home field for the California State University, San Bernardino Coyotes baseball team. The Coyotes play in the California Collegiate Athletic Association in Division II of the National Collegiate Athletic Association NCAA. In 2004, it also served as the home of the Los Angeles Unity, the city's Pro Cricket team. In 2010, San Manuel Stadium was equipped with a new scoreboard, which was the largest in the California League. In 2010, CSUSB moved its home games to Fiscalini Field, San Bernardino's former minor league stadium. The San Manuel facilities are used by the San Bernardino Valley College's baseball team as well.

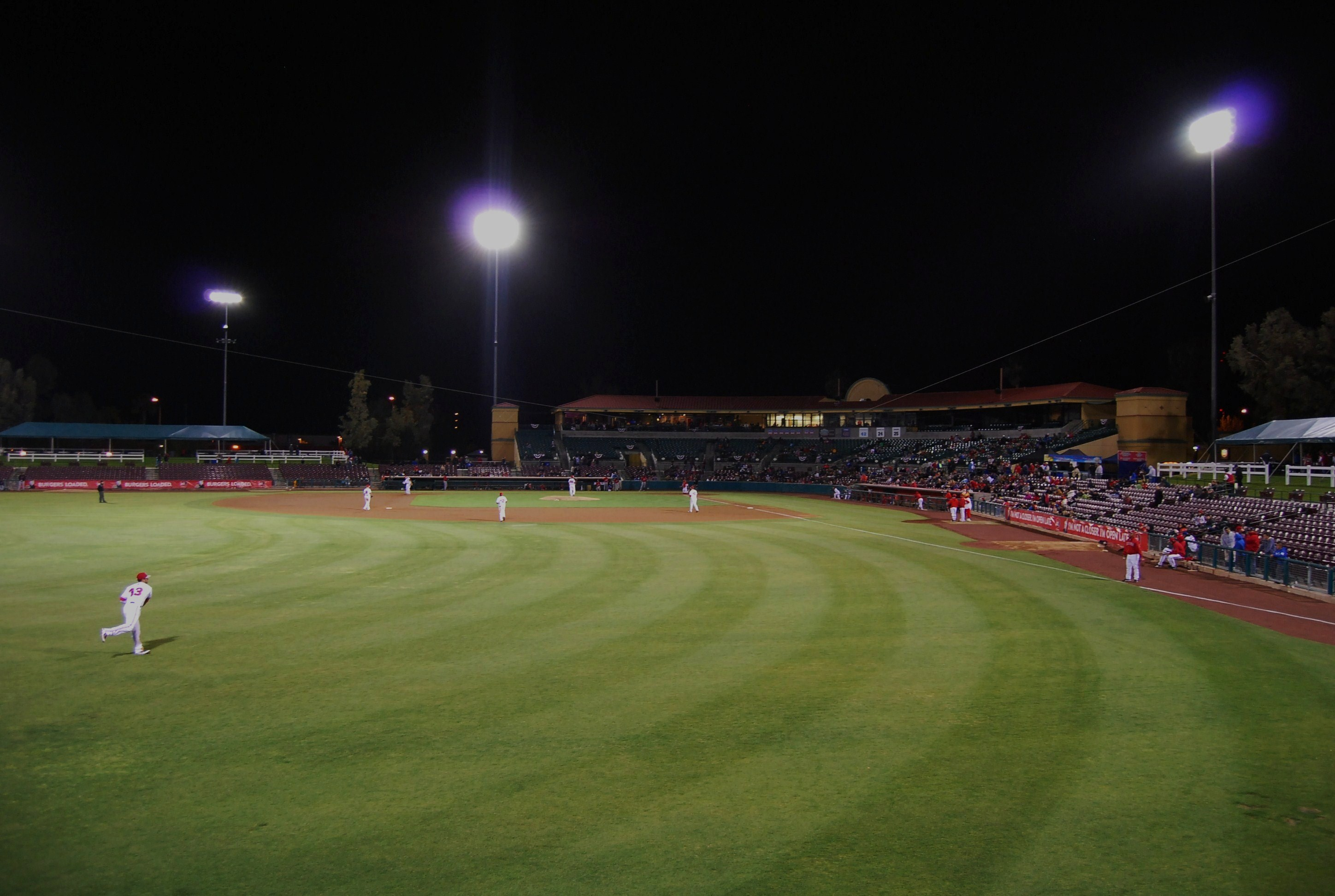
The stadium and the playing field

Former logo
