= Lake Elsinore Diamond =

Stadium in California

- Storm Stadium
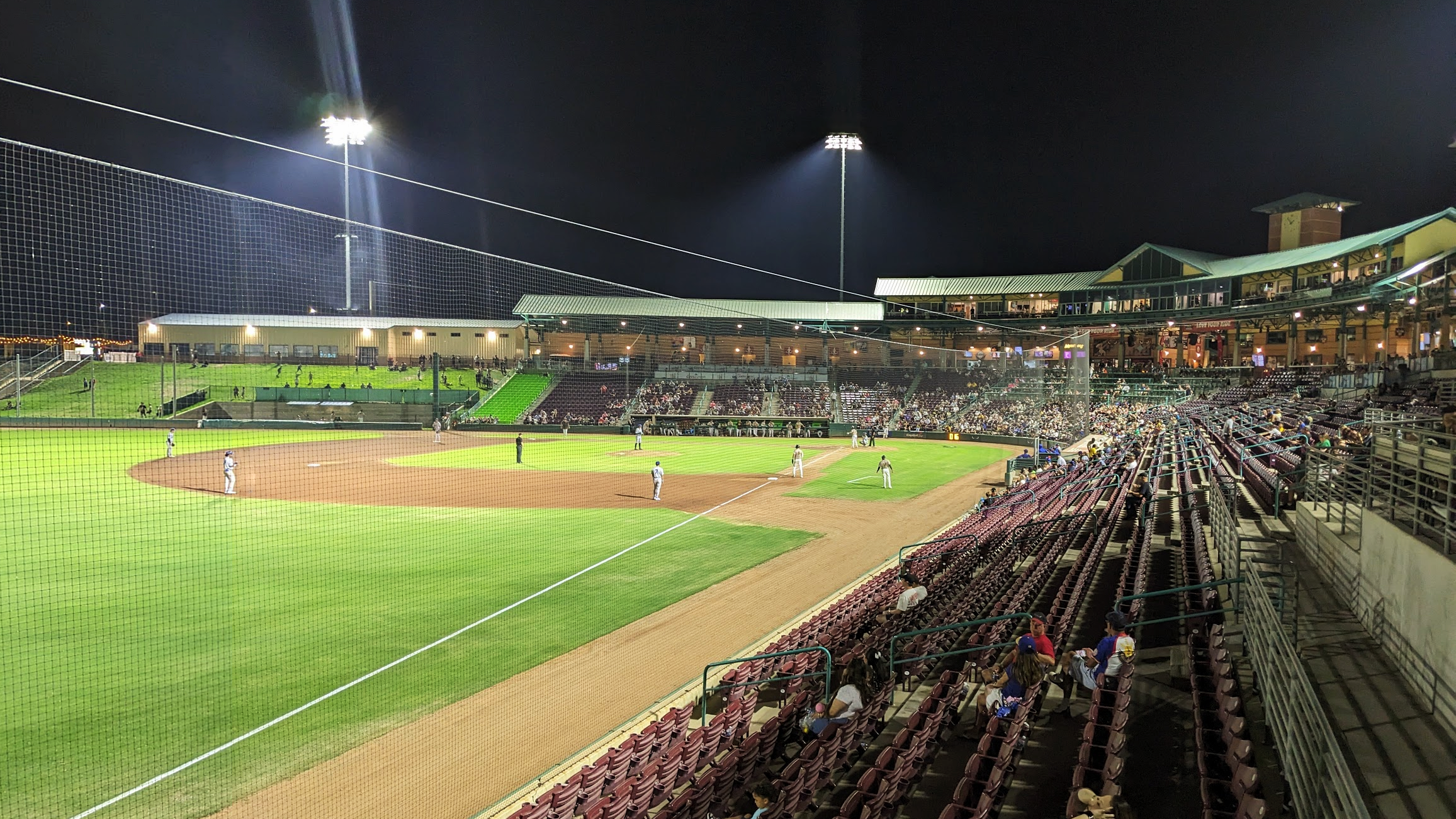
- Lake Elsinore Diamond in 2026
- Interactive map of Lake Elsinore Diamond
- Location: 500 Diamond Drive; Lake Elsinore, CA 92530
- Coordinates: 33°39′15″N 117°18′7″W
- Owner: City of Lake Elsinore
- Operator: Storm Entertainment
- Capacity: 4,835
- Surface: Tiffsport (Bermuda grass)
- Field size: Left Field – 330 ft Left-Center Power Alley – 425 ft Center Field – 400 ft Right-Center Power Alley – 386 ft Right Field – 310 ft Backstop – 50 ft

Construction
- Groundbreaking: October 1992
- Opened: April 15, 1994
- Cost: $24.3 million ($52.8 million in 2025 dollars)
- Architect: HNTB
- General contractors: Peter M. Savello & Associates Inc.

Tenant
- Lake Elsinore Storm (CL) (1994–present)

Lake Elsinore Diamond, also referred to as Storm Stadium, is a ballpark in Lake Elsinore, California. It is the home of the Lake Elsinore Storm, a Minor League Baseball team in the California League. The field at the stadium is named Pete Lehr Field.

== History ==
It was built in 1994 and has a capacity of over 8,000 people with 6,066 permanent seats. That capacity was later reduced to 4,835 during renovations undertaken after the 2017 season which exchanged seating for an expansion of the left field deck area. The original $8 million construction estimate in 1992, however, ballooned to more than $22 million by the time of its completion.

== Other uses ==
The company that currently manages the site is Storm Entertainment, a newly developed entity of Storm Baseball. When baseball is not in season, the field is used for a number of other purposes including concerts, boxing matches, and local high school graduations, all of which can utilize temporary seating to increase the capacity to 14,000.

This stadium also has a yearly event for Halloween, the "Field of Screams".

In December 2017, the park hosted the Stadium Super Trucks racing series' World Championship Finals. To create the course, approximately 150,000 square feet of dirt was brought in. The series returned to the Diamond for its 2018 season opener, while the 2020 edition was canceled due to the COVID-19 pandemic.

=== Diamond Tap Room ===
The Diamond Tap Room is the name of the enclosed restaurant and patio in the left field corner. The restaurant has a full menu and is open to the public during all home games. The venue can host various events including birthdays, weddings, etc. It can hold up to 300 guests has several full menus for one's choosing.

== Dimensions ==
Right field is 310 feet away from home plate, with center field at a distance of 400 feet and left field at a distance of 330 feet. The deepest part of the park is the left center power alley at 425 feet. The grass used is Tiffsport, a hybrid Bermuda grass, which is overseeded with ryegrass for the winter.

== See also ==
- Lake Elsinore Storm
- Lake Elsinore, California
- San Diego Padres
- Riverside County, California
- Minor league baseball
- Farm team
