= High Desert Mavericks =

- 1991–2016; Adelanto, California
Team logo
Cap insignia

Minor league affiliations
- Class: Class A-Advanced (1991–2016)
- League: California League (1991–2016)

Major league affiliations
- Team: Texas Rangers (2015–2016); Seattle Mariners (2007–2014); Kansas City Royals (2005–2006); Milwaukee Brewers (2001–2004); Arizona Diamondbacks (1997–2000); Baltimore Orioles (1995–1996); Florida Marlins (1993); San Diego Padres (1991–1992)

Minor league titles
- League titles (4): 1991; 1993; 1997; 2016

Team data
- Name: High Desert Mavericks (1991–2016)
- Colors: Red, black, white
- Mascot: Wooly-Bully (1991–2016)
- Ballpark: Heritage Field at Stater Bros. Stadium (1991–2016)

The High Desert Mavericks were an American Minor League Baseball team in Adelanto, California, that operated from 1991 to 2016. They played in the Class A-Advanced California League, with home games at Heritage Field at Stater Bros. Stadium. The franchise had eight different major league affiliations over its 25 seasons.

== History ==
In 1991, the Riverside Red Wave moved north to the city of Adelanto, part of the Victor Valley metro area in California's High Desert region, where they were renamed the High Desert Mavericks. The Mavericks played their home baseball games at the 3,808-seat Heritage Field at Stater Bros. Stadium, opened in 1991 as Mavericks Stadium and renamed in 2007. The ballpark, which sits next to Hwy 395, is known to be an extremely hitter-friendly venue that tended to inflate home run totals drastically. As a result, offensive statistics for High Desert players were discounted for comparative purposes, while the reverse was the case for statistics accumulated by High Desert pitchers.

The Mavericks won the 1991 California League title in their first year of existence.

The team's owners began seeking to sell the Mavericks in 2009, and on November 29, 2010, the team was sold to Main Street Baseball. Rumors had the team moving to Chico, California, if a new proposed ballpark had been built there, but on August 12, 2012, it was reported that the Mavericks would be staying in the High Desert through the 2015 season and possibly through 2018.

In January 2016, the Adelanto City Council voided the team's lease at Heritage Field. The Mavericks were able to continue for the 2016 season at Heritage Field. However, on August 22, 2016, the California League announced the Mavericks would not return for the 2017 season and would cease operations.

Before the California League announced the Mavericks would not return, it was rumored that the team would move to Kinston, North Carolina, and join the Carolina League while keeping the Rangers affiliation. Instead, Minor League Baseball announced on August 22 that two expansion teams would join the Carolina League in 2017 with the new Kinston team taking over the Rangers affiliation at the A-Advanced level from the Mavericks.

In their final game, the High Desert Mavericks defeated the Visalia Rawhide 7–4 on September 17, 2016, to capture the California League championship. The Mavericks' Luke Tendler hit the final California League home run, a solo home run shot in the bottom of the 8th inning.

In March 2019, the city and the Mavericks' owners settled a lawsuit brought by the owners over the city's 2016 attempt to void the stadium lease, with the city paying $3.8 million to the team owners.

== Achievements ==
- The Mavericks are the only California League team to win championships in the years that their major league parent clubs also came into existence.
- The Mavericks were the first California League team to have cheerleaders. The Maverick Girls performed dance numbers atop the dugouts in between innings.
- On June 28, 2009, the Mavericks performed two historic feats. They combined with the Lake Elsinore Storm to set a California League record for combined runs scored (51) in a 33–18 loss, and outfielder James McOwen set the California League record for longest hitting streak, hitting safely for the 36th straight game.

== Notable High Desert Mavericks alumni ==
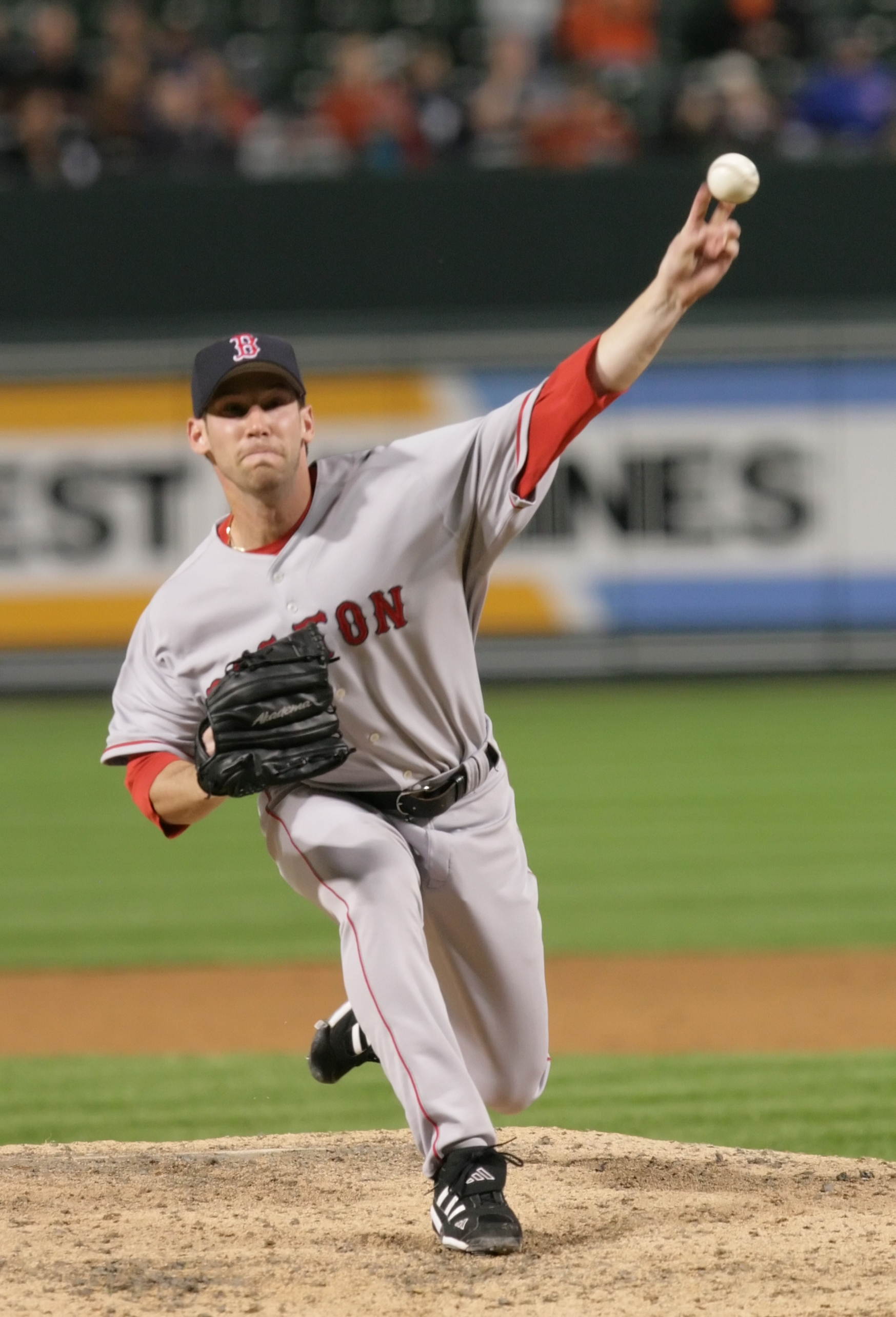
Craig Breslow

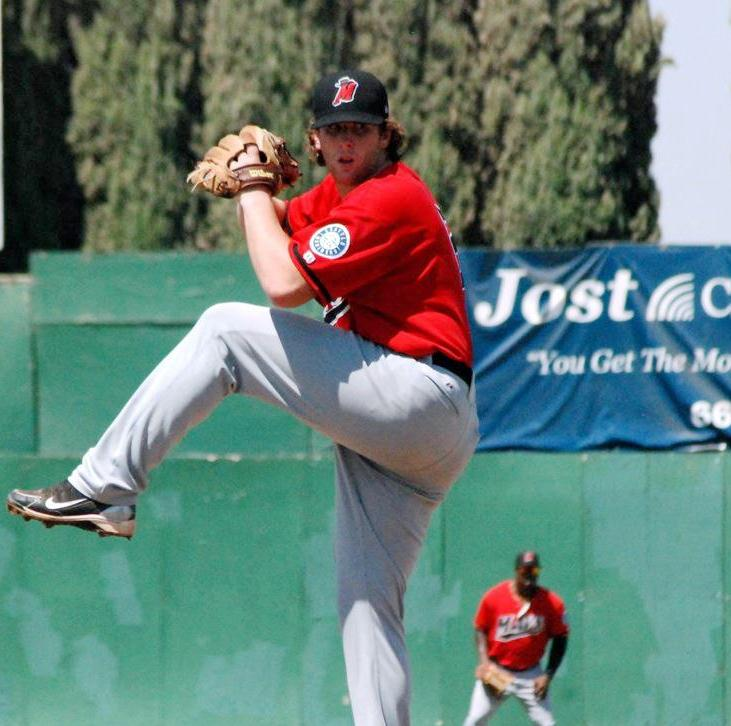
Taylor Stanton pitching for High Desert in 2012

- Rod Barajas
- Nick Bierbrodt
- Bruce Bochy (inaugural manager)
- Craig Breslow
- Billy Butler
- Howie Clark
- Jack Cust
- Greg Halman
- Robby Hammock
- J. J. Hardy
- Corey Hart
- J. P. Howell
- Shawn Kelley
- Travis Lee
- Cory Lidle
- Javier López
- Matt Mangini
- Matt Mieske
- Erick Monzón
- Jay Gainer
- Carl Everett
- Robert Person
- Brad Nelson
- Vicente Padilla
- Brad Penny
- Michael Pineda
- Stephen C. Reich
- Michael Saunders
- Junior Spivey
- Matt Vasgersian (MLB Network Announcer, was the Mavericks first radio announcer 1991)
- Don Wakamatsu (managed Mavs in 1998, was California League Manager of the Year that year; first Asian-American MLB manager)
- Howard Johnson (as manager)
- Brandon Weeden
