= Inland Empire 66ers =

Inland Empire 66ers of San Bernardino
- Founded in 1987; San Bernardino, California

Team logo	Cap insignia

Minor league affiliations
- Class: Single-A (2021–present)
- Previous classes: Class A-Advanced (1987–2020)
- League: California League (1987–present)
- Division: South

Major league affiliations
- Team: Seattle Mariners (1987-1994; 2001-2006; 2026–present)
- Previous teams: Los Angeles Dodgers (1995–2000, 2007–2010); Los Angeles Angels (2011–2025)

Minor league titles
- League titles (6): 1995; 1999; 2000; 2003; 2006; 2013
- Division titles (1): 2025
- Second-half titles (3): 2022; 2023; 2025

Team data
- Name: Inland Empire 66ers of San Bernardino (2003–present)
- Previous names: San Bernardino Stampede (1996–2002); San Bernardino Spirit (1987–1995)
- Colors: Black, powder blue, orange, graphite, gray, white
- Mascot: Bernie
- Ballpark: San Manuel Stadium (1996–present)
- Previous parks: Fiscalini Field (1987–1995)
- Owner/ Operator: Diamond Baseball Holdings
- General manager: Joe Hudson
- Manager: Luis Caballero
- Website: milb.com/inland-empire

The Inland Empire 66ers of San Bernardino are a Minor League Baseball team of the California League and the Single-A affiliate of the Seattle Mariners. The team's home ballpark is San Manuel Stadium in San Bernardino, California.

== History ==
The 66ers began when the Salinas Spurs moved to San Bernardino and bought the name of the San Bernardino Spirit from the Rancho Cucamonga Quakes who had just left town. The team was bought by Elmore Sports Group soon afterwards. The team originally played at Fiscalini Field until 1996 when the team moved to San Bernardino Stadium, nicknamed "The Ranch" in concert with the team's new name, the San Bernardino Stampede.

Later, the stadium was re-christened San Manuel Stadium sponsored by the San Manuel Band of Mission Indians with their casino.

In 2003, a competition was held to determine a new name for the organization. Season ticket holder Phil Westbook's proposal for a team representing the Inland Empire ultimately led to the team's current name, the Inland Empire 66ers of San Bernardino.

In September 2006, the 66ers announced they were renewing their affiliation with the Los Angeles Dodgers beginning in the 2007 season. That affiliation lasted through the 2010 season.

In September 2010, the 66ers agreed to a two-year affiliation to be the Los Angeles Angels' High-A affiliate.

At one time, the team had a National Public Radio affiliate, KVCR-FM, broadcasting its games on radio. However, in 2008, the team changed to commercial talk station KCAA.

In conjunction with Major League Baseball's restructuring of Minor League Baseball in 2021, the 66ers were organized into the Low-A West at the Low-A classification. They retained their affiliation with the Angels. In 2022, the Low-A West name was replaced with the California League, the name historically used by the regional circuit prior to 2021, and was reclassified as a Single-A circuit.

On March 27, 2024, the club announced Diamond Baseball Holdings had purchased the team. On December 15, following the sale of the Modesto Nuts franchise to Diamond Holdings, it was announced the 66ers would become the Class-A affiliate of the Seattle Mariners beginning in 2026. The move consisted of the 66ers assuming the place of the Nuts in a de facto relocation of the Modesto team, which ceased operations following a failure to pay for improvements to Modesto's stadium; the previous incarnation of the 66ers moved to Rancho Cucamonga, assuming the identity of the Rancho Cucamonga Quakes; and that team relocated to a new stadium in Ontario, California, becoming the Ontario Tower Buzzers.

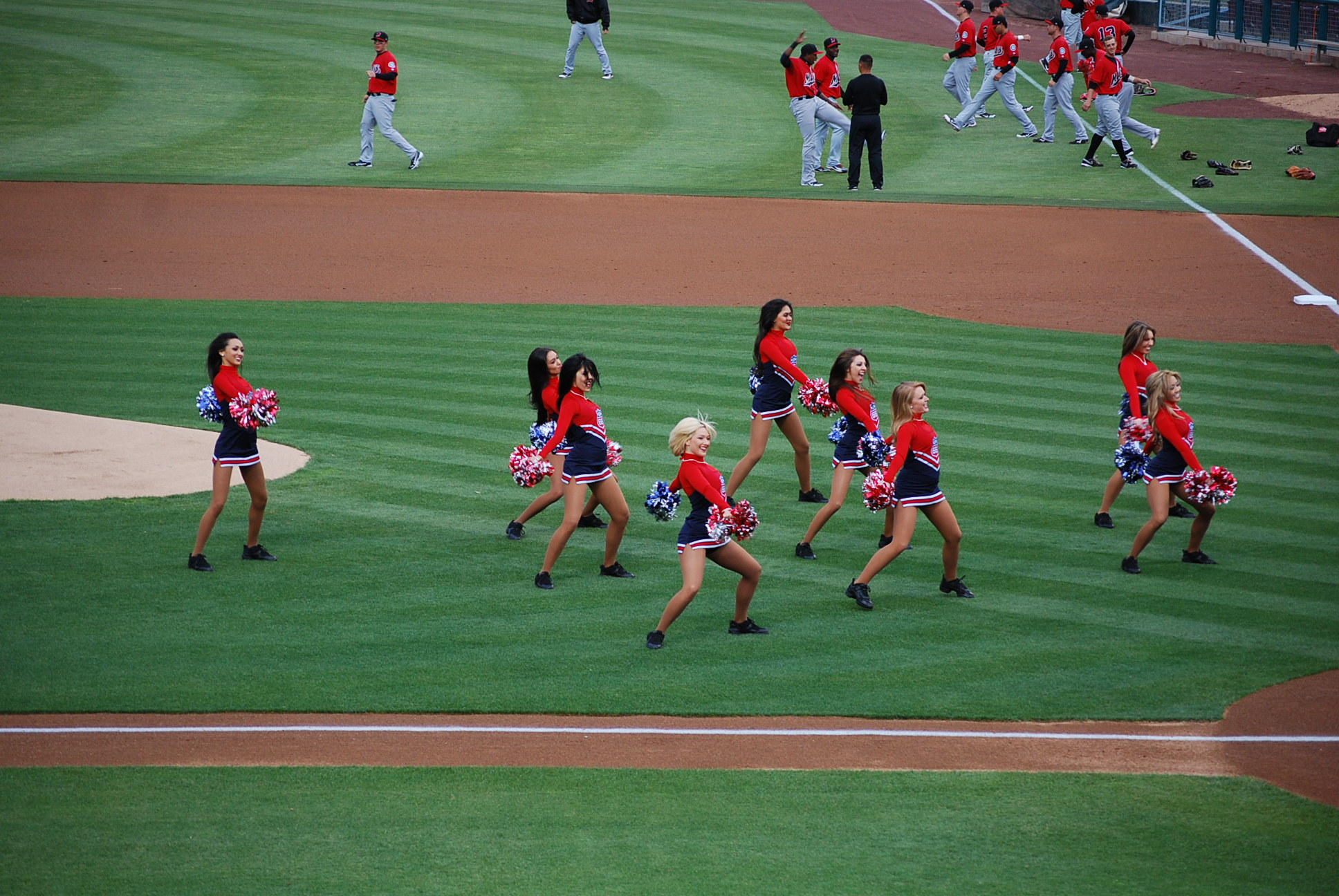
The dance team performing on the field

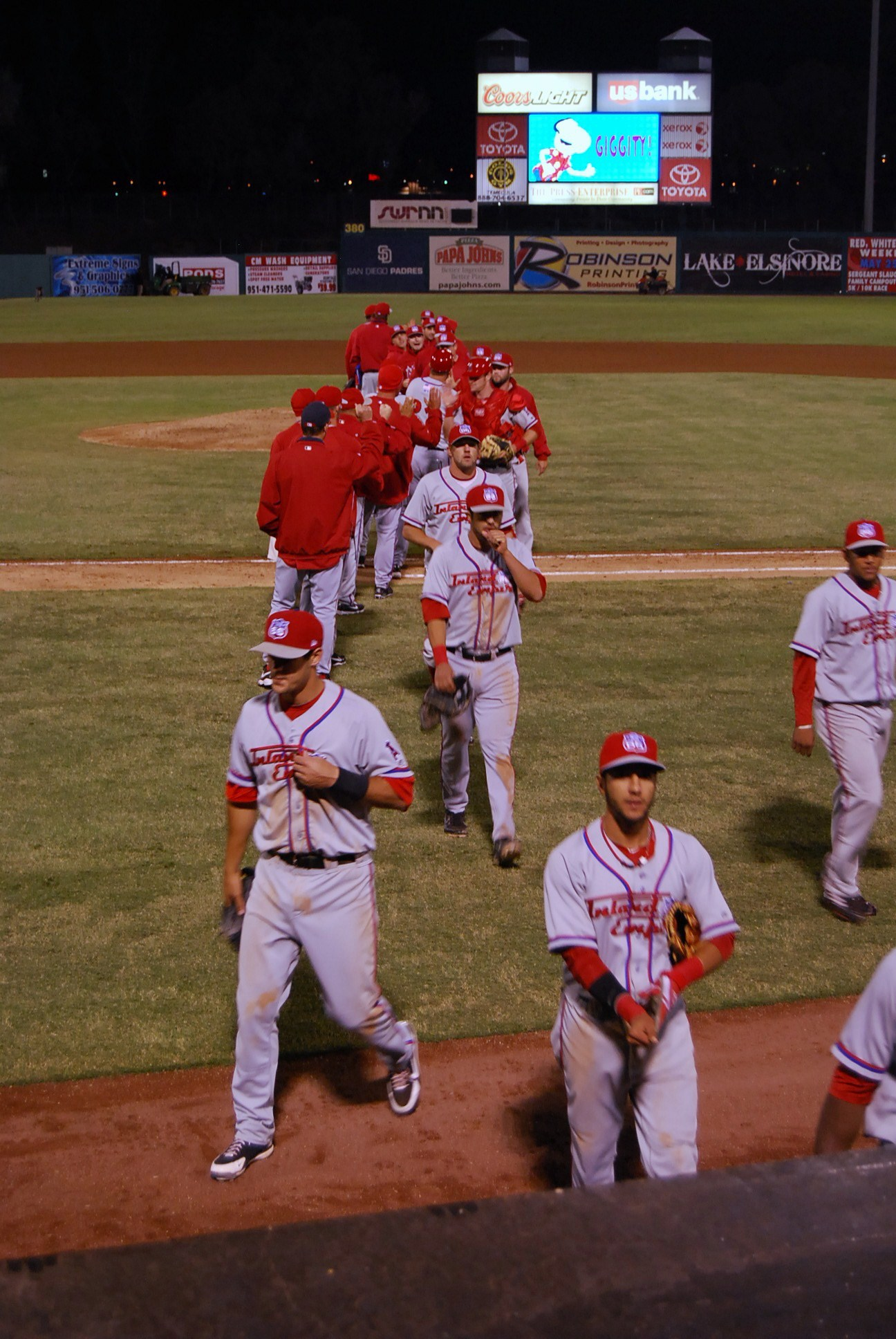
The team at Lake Elsinore Diamond in 2012

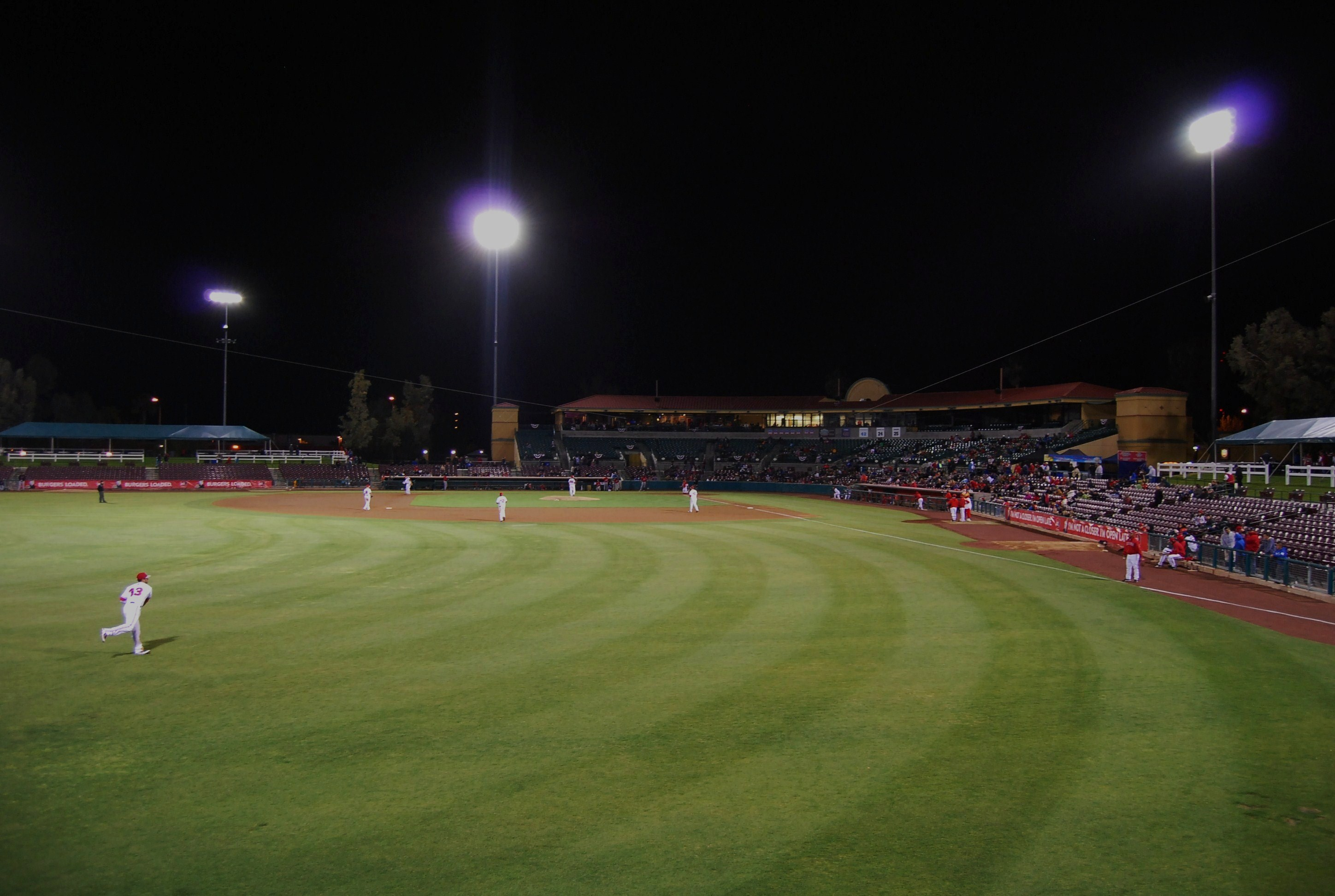
San Manuel Stadium

== Season-by-season records ==
- San Bernardino Spirit (1993–1995)
- San Bernardino Stampede (1996–2002)
- Inland Empire 66ers (2003–present)

Season	Record	Finish	Manager	Playoffs
1993	62–74	7th	Greg Mahlberg	—
1994	48–88	9th	Greg Mahlberg	—
1995	84–54	1st	Ron Roenicke	League Champions
1996	70–70	7th	Del Crandall	—
1997	68–72	7th	Del Crandall / Dino Ebel	Lost League Finals
1998	55–85	9th	Mickey Hatcher / Joe Vavra / Tim Wallach	—
1999	80–61	2nd	Rick Burleson	League Champions
2000	77–63	4th	Dino Ebel	League Champions
2001	76–64	3rd	Daren Brown	Lost in 1st round
2002	77–63	3rd	Daren Brown	Lost in 2nd round
2003	78–62	2nd	Steve Roadcap	League Champions
2004	77–63	3rd	Daren Brown	Lost in 2nd round
2005	58–82	9th	Daren Brown	—
2006	72–68	5th	Gary Thurman	League Champions
2007	72–67	3rd	Dave Collins	Lost in 1st round
2008	68–73	3rd	John Valentin	Lost in 1st round
2009	59–81	4th	Carlos Subero	
2010	50–90	5th	Jeff Carter	
2011	69–71	5th	Tom Gamboa	
2012	66–74	5th	Bill Haselman	
2013	69–71	5th	Bill Haselman	League Champions
2014	62–78	5th	Denny Hocking	Lost in 2nd round
2015	61–79	4th	Denny Hocking	
2016	48–92	5th	Chad Tracy	
2017	65-75	3rd	Chad Tracy	
2018	67-73	4th	Ryan Barba	
2019	57-82	4th	Ryan Barba	
2020	season canceled due to COVID-19 pandemic			
2021	56-61	2nd	Jack Howell	
2022	77-55	1st	Ever Magallanes	Lost in Semifinals
2023	68-61	2nd	Dave Stapleton	Lost in Semifinals
2024	58-72	4th	Dave Stapleton	
2025	60-72	3rd	Dave Stapleton	Lost in League Championship

== Current roster ==
Inland Empire 66ers roster
Players	Coaches/Other
Pitchers: 32 Will Armbruester; 14 Jack Bowery; 10 Aiden Butler; 20 Ray Cebulski; 34 Cole Cheatham; 38 Gleiner Diaz; 21 German Fajardo; 34 Anderson Guevara; 28 Sean Hermann; 22 Thomas Higgins; 44 Anthony Karoly; 19 Aneury Lora; 23 Reese Lumpkin; 27 Danny Macchiarola; 15 Jean Munoz; 36 Daniel Ouderkirk; 44 Marcelo Perez #; 29 Mason Peters; 6 Jose Romero; 48 Scott Rouse; 33 Jackson Steensma; 39 Jose Gabriel Torres; 27 Connor Wilford; 34 Jose Zerpa ‡; Catchers: 16 Connor Dykstra; 7 Grant Jay; Infielders: 31 Starlin Aguilar; 30 Ricardo Cova; 17 Dustin Crenshaw; 43 Estevan Moreno; 18 Brady O'Brien; 1 Dervy Ventura; Outfielders: 4 Korbyn Dickerson; 3 George Feliz; 11 Ryan Picollo; 25 Cesar Quintas; 9 Aidan Taurek	Manager: 5 Luis Caballero; Coaches: 13 Josh Morgan (bench); 12 Sam Delaplane (pitching); 8 Nick Ward (hitting); 60-day injured list: -- Gage Boehm (full season); 23 Harrison Kreiling; -- Anyelo Ovando (full season); 36 Adrian Quintana; -- Will Riley; 27 Chia-shi Shen; 15 Matt Tiberia; 7-day injured list; * On Seattle Mariners 40-man roster; ~ Development list; # Rehab assignment; ∞ Reserve list; ‡ Restricted list; § Suspended list; † Temporarily inactive list; Roster updated June 30, 2026; Transactions; → More rosters: MiLB • California League; → Seattle Mariners minor league players

== Notable alumni ==
Hall of Fame alumni

- Ken Griffey Jr. (1988) Inducted, 2016
- Adrián Beltré (1996) Inducted, 2024

MLB award winners and other notable alumni

- Asdrúbal Cabrera (2005) 2x MLB All-Star
- Chin-Feng Chen (1999) First Taiwanese player in MLB history; #43 jersey retired by the team
- Shin-Soo Choo (2002–2003) 1x All-Star
- Jeff Cirillo (2003) 2x All-Star, Milwaukee Brewers Wall of Honor
- Del Crandall (1996–1997, manager) 11x All-Star, 4x Gold Glove winner
- Rich Dauer (1988, manager) Baltimore Orioles Hall of Fame
- Rafael Furcal (2007, 2010) 3x All-Star; 2000 NL Rookie of the Year
- Mark Grudzielanek (1999) 1x All-Star
- Kenley Jansen (2009–2010) 4x All-Star
- Mike Hampton (1992) 2x All-Star
- Mark Harmon (actor, part owner)
- Félix Hernández (2004) 6x All-Star, 2010 AL Cy Young Award winner
- Orel Hershiser (2000) 3x All-Star, 1988 World Series Most Valuable Player, 1988 NL Cy Young Award
- Todd Hollandsworth (1995, 1997, 1999) 1996 NL Rookie of the Year
- Eric Karros (1998) 1992 NL Rookie of the Year
- Paul Konerko (1995) 6x All-Star
- Ted Lilly (1997) 2x All-Star
- Gregg Olson 1x All Star, 1989 NL Rookie of the Year
- Carlos Santana (2008), 1x All-Star, 2019 Silver Slugger, 2024 Gold Glove
- Bill Swift (1989) 1992 NL ERA Leader
- Ismael Valdez (1998)
- Omar Vizquel (1990) 11x Gold Glove winner, 3x All-Star
- Tim Wallach (1995) (1998, manager) 5x All-Star
- Devon White (2000) 7x Gold Glove winner, 3x All-Star
- C.J. Wilson (1986) 2x MLB All-Star
- Steve Yeager (coach) 1981 World Series MVP
