= List of High-A baseball team owners =

Current High-A (baseball) team owners and the principal corporate entities that operate the clubs:

== Midwest League ==
Team	Division	Owner(s)	Principal(s)	Year acquired	Affiliate
Beloit Sky Carp	West	Quint Studer, Rishy Studer	Quint Studer, Rishy Studer	2021	Miami Marlins
Cedar Rapids Kernels	West	Cedar Rapids Ball Club, Inc.	Steve Brice (CEO)		Minnesota Twins
Dayton Dragons	East	Diamond Baseball Holdings	Pat Battle (chairman); Peter B. Freund (CEO)	2025	Cincinnati Reds
Fort Wayne TinCaps	East	Hardball Capital	Jason Freier	2006	San Diego Padres
Great Lakes Loons	East	Michigan Baseball Foundation	William S. Stavropoulos	2006	Los Angeles Dodgers
Lake County Captains	East	COLLiDE NEO	Alan Miller, Jon Ryan	2023	Cleveland Guardians
Lansing Lugnuts	East	Diamond Baseball Holdings	Pat Battle (chairman); Peter Freund (CEO)	2023	Athletics
Peoria Chiefs	West	Peoria Chiefs Community Baseball LLC	David Bielfeldt		St. Louis Cardinals
Quad Cities River Bandits	West	Main Street Baseball	Dave Heller		Kansas City Royals
South Bend Cubs	West	Andrew T. Berlin	Andrew T. Berlin		Chicago Cubs
West Michigan Whitecaps	East	Lew Chamberlin and Denny Baxter	Lew Chamberlin and Denny Baxter	1993 (founded)	Detroit Tigers
Wisconsin Timber Rattlers	West	Diamond Baseball Holdings	Pat Battle (chairman); Peter B. Freund (CEO)	2025	Milwaukee Brewers

== Northwest League ==
Team	Owner(s)	Principal(s)	Year acquired	Affiliate
Eugene Emeralds	Elmore Sports Group	David G. Elmore Jr.	1983	San Francisco Giants
Everett AquaSox	7th Inning Stretch LLC	Tom Volpe	2008	Seattle Mariners
Hillsboro Hops	Short Season, LLC	Mike McMurray (President)	2012 (founded)	Arizona Diamondbacks
Spokane Indians	Brett Sports & Entertainment	Brett brothers: George Brett, Ken Brett, Bobby Brett, John Brett	1985	Colorado Rockies
Tri-City Dust Devils	Diamond Baseball Holdings	Pat Battle (chairman); Peter B. Freund (CEO)	2024	Los Angeles Angels
Vancouver Canadians	Diamond Baseball Holdings	Pat Battle (chairman); Peter B. Freund (CEO)	2023	Toronto Blue Jays

== South Atlantic League ==
Team	Division	Owner(s)	Principal(s)	Year acquired	Affiliate
Asheville Tourists	South	DeWine Seeds-Silver Dollar Baseball	Mike DeWine and family	2010	Houston Astros
Bowling Green Hot Rods	South	Jack Blackstock	Jack Blackstock	2018	Tampa Bay Rays
Brooklyn Cyclones	North	Diamond Baseball Holdings	Pat Battle (chairman); Peter B. Freund (CEO)	2024	New York Mets
Frederick Keys	North	Attain Sports and Entertainment	Greg Baroni, Richard Roberts	2022	Baltimore Orioles
Greensboro Grasshoppers	South	Temerity Baseball (Temerity Capital Partners)	Andy Sandler	2022	Pittsburgh Pirates
Greenville Drive	South	Craig Brown	Craig Brown	2006	Boston Red Sox
Hub City Spartanburgers	South	Diamond Baseball Holdings	Pat Battle (chairman); Peter B. Freund (CEO)	2023	Texas Rangers
Hudson Valley Renegades	North	Diamond Baseball Holdings	Pat Battle (chairman); Peter Freund (CEO)	2021	New York Yankees
Jersey Shore BlueClaws	North	Shore Town Baseball	Art Matin	2017	Philadelphia Phillies
Rome Emperors	South	Diamond Baseball Holdings	Pat Battle (chairman); Peter Freund (CEO)	2021	Atlanta Braves
Wilmington Blue Rocks	North	Main Street Baseball, Clark Minker	Clark Minker, Dave Heller (CEO, President)	2014	Washington Nationals
Winston-Salem Dash	South	Diamond Baseball Holdings	Pat Battle (chairman); Peter Freund (CEO)	2024	Chicago White Sox

== See also ==
- List of Major League Baseball team owners
- List of International League owners
- List of Pacific Coast League owners
- List of Double-A baseball team owners
- List of Single-A baseball team owners
- List of Pioneer League owners
