= List of Double-A baseball team owners =

Current Double-A (baseball) team owners and the principal corporate entities that operate the clubs:

== Eastern League ==
Division	Team	MLB affiliation	Owner(s)	Principal(s)	Year acquired
Northeast	Binghamton Rumble Ponies	New York Mets	Diamond Baseball Holdings	Pat Battle (chairman); Peter B. Freund (CEO)	2024
Northeast	Hartford Yard Goats	Colorado Rockies	Josh Solomon	Josh Solomon	2016
Northeast	New Hampshire Fisher Cats	Toronto Blue Jays	Diamond Baseball Holdings	Pat Battle (chairman); Peter B. Freund (CEO)	2023
Northeast	Portland Sea Dogs	Boston Red Sox	Diamond Baseball Holdings	Pat Battle (chairman); Peter B. Freund (CEO)	2022
Northeast	Reading Fightin Phils	Philadelphia Phillies	Diamond Baseball Holdings	Pat Battle (chairman); Peter Freund (CEO)	2025
Northeast	Somerset Patriots	New York Yankees	The Kalafer Family	Jonathan Kalafer, Josh Kalafer	1999
Southwest	Akron RubberDucks	Cleveland Guardians	Prospector Baseball Group	John Abbamondi and Ben Boyer	2025
Southwest	Altoona Curve	Pittsburgh Pirates	Diamond Baseball Holdings	Pat Battle (chairman); Peter B. Freund (CEO)	2023
Southwest	Chesapeake Baysox	Baltimore Orioles	Attain Sports and Entertainment	Greg Baroni (CEO)	2022
Southwest	Erie SeaWolves	Detroit Tigers	Fernando Aguirre	Fernando Aguirre	2015
Southwest	Harrisburg Senators	Washington Nationals	Diamond Baseball Holdings	Pat Battle (chairman); Peter B. Freund (CEO)	2024
Southwest	Richmond Flying Squirrels	San Francisco Giants	Lou DiBella	Lou DiBella	2017

== Southern League ==
Division	Team	MLB affiliation	Owner(s)	Principal(s)	Year acquired
North	Birmingham Barons	Chicago White Sox	Diamond Baseball Holdings	Pat Battle (chairman); Peter B. Freund (CEO)	2023
North	Chattanooga Lookouts	Cincinnati Reds	Hardball Capital Group	Jason Freier (CEO), John Woods	2015
North	Knoxville Smokies	Chicago Cubs	Boyd Sports	Randy Boyd, Jenny Boyd	2013
North	Rocket City Trash Pandas	Los Angeles Angels	BallCorps LLC	Ralph Nelson (CEO)	2017
South	Biloxi Shuckers	Milwaukee Brewers	Shuckers Baseball, LLC	John Tracy	2023
South	Columbus Clingstones	Atlanta Braves	Diamond Baseball Holdings	Pat Battle (chairman); Peter B. Freund (CEO)	2021
South	Montgomery Biscuits	Tampa Bay Rays	OnDeck Partners (Avenue Capital Group)	Marc Lasry	2025
South	Pensacola Blue Wahoos	Miami Marlins	Quint Studer, Rishy Studer, Bubba Watson	Quint Studer, Rishy Studer, Bubba Watson	2015

== Texas League ==
Division	Team	MLB affiliation	Owner(s)	Principal	Year acquired
North	Arkansas Travelers	Seattle Mariners	Diamond Baseball Holdings	Pat Battle (chairman); Peter B. Freund (CEO)	2024
North	Northwest Arkansas Naturals	Kansas City Royals	Rich Baseball Operations	Robert E. Rich Jr.	1984
North	Ozarks Springbirds	St. Louis Cardinals	Diamond Baseball Holdings	Pat Battle (chairman); Peter Freund (CEO)	2023
North	Tulsa Drillers	Los Angeles Dodgers	Diamond Baseball Holdings	Pat Battle (chairman); Peter Freund (CEO)	2023
North	Wichita Turbo Tubs	Minnesota Twins	Diamond Baseball Holdings	Pat Battle (chairman); Peter Freund (CEO)	2022
South	Amarillo Sod Poodles	Arizona Diamondbacks	Elmore Sports Group	David G. Elmore Jr.	2019
South	Corpus Christi Hooks	Houston Astros	Diamond Baseball Holdings	Pat Battle (chairman); Peter Freund (CEO)	2025
South	Frisco RoughRiders	Texas Rangers	Greenberg Sports Group	Chuck Greenberg, Scott Sonju	2014
South	Midland RockHounds	Athletics	Diamond Baseball Holdings	Pat Battle (chairman); Peter Freund (CEO)	2022
South	San Antonio Missions	San Diego Padres	Designated Bidders LLC	Graham wWatson, Peter Holt	2022

== See also ==
- List of Major League Baseball team owners
- List of International League owners
- List of Pacific Coast League owners
- List of High-A baseball team owners
- List of Single-A baseball team owners
- List of Pioneer League owners
