= List of Single-A baseball team owners =

Current Single-A (baseball) team owners and the principals that operate the clubs:

== California League ==
Team	Division	Owner(s)	Principal(s)	Year acquired	Affiliate
Fresno Grizzlies	North	Diamond Baseball Holdings	Pat Battle (chairman); Peter B. Freund (CEO)	2023	Colorado Rockies
Inland Empire 66ers	South	Diamond Baseball Holdings	Pat Battle (chairman); Peter B. Freund (CEO)	2024	Seattle Mariners
Lake Elsinore Storm	South	Storm LP	Gary E. Jacobs		San Diego Padres
Ontario Tower Buzzers	North	Diamond Baseball Holdings	Pat Battle (chairman); Peter B. Freund (CEO)	2025	Los Angeles Dodgers
Rancho Cucamonga Quakes	South	Diamond Baseball Holdings	Pat Battle (chairman); Peter B. Freund (CEO)	2024	Los Angeles Angels
San Jose Giants	North	Diamond Baseball Holdings	Pat Battle (chairman); Peter B. Freund (CEO)	2021	San Francisco Giants
Stockton Ports	North	7th Inning Stretch LLC	Tom Volpe	2002	Athletics
Visalia Rawhide	South	First Pitch Entertainment LLC	Sam Sigal	2019	Arizona Diamondbacks

== Carolina League ==
Team	Division	Owner(s)	Principal(s)	Year acquired	Affiliate
Augusta GreenJackets	South	Diamond Baseball Holdings	Pat Battle (chairman); Peter B. Freund (CEO)	2021	Atlanta Braves
Charleston RiverDogs	South	Goldklang Group	Marvin Goldklang, Bill Murray, Mike Veeck		Tampa Bay Rays
Columbia Fireflies	South	Hardball Capital LLC	Jason Freier	2016 (founded)	Kansas City Royals
Delmarva Shorebirds	North	7th Inning Stretch LLC	Tom Volpe	2006	Baltimore Orioles
Fayetteville Woodpeckers	North	Diamond Baseball Holdings	Pat Battle (chairman); Peter B. Freund (CEO)	2025	Houston Astros
Fredericksburg Nationals	North	Diamond Baseball Holdings	Pat Battle (chairman); Peter B. Freund (CEO)	2025	Washington Nationals
Hickory Crawdads	South	Diamond Baseball Holdings	Pat Battle (chairman); Peter B. Freund (CEO)	2023	Texas Rangers
Kannapolis Cannon Ballers	South	Temerity Baseball LLC (Temerity Capital Partners)	Andy Sandler	2018	Chicago White Sox
Lynchburg Hillcats	North	Hillcats Baseball LLC	Dylan Naang	2024	Cleveland Guardians
Myrtle Beach Pelicans	South	Myrtle Beach Pelicans LP (Greenberg Sports Group)	Chuck Greenberg (businessman)	2006	Chicago Cubs
Salem RidgeYaks	North	Diamond Baseball Holdings	Pat Battle (chairman); Peter Freund (CEO)	2023	Boston Red Sox
Wilson Warbirds	North	Milwaukee Brewers	Mark Attanasio (Brewers owner); Joe Ricciuti (Team President)	2026 (founded)	Milwaukee Brewers

== Florida State League ==
Team	Division	Owner(s)	Principal(s)	Year acquired	Affiliate
Bradenton Marauders	West	Pittsburgh Pirates	Bob Nutting (Pirates owner)	2010	Pittsburgh Pirates
Clearwater Threshers	West	Philadelphia Phillies	John Middleton (Phillies owner)	1985 (founded)	Philadelphia Phillies
Daytona Tortugas	East	Tortugas Baseball Club, LLC	Renee Smith III	2015	Cincinnati Reds
Dunedin Blue Jays	West	Toronto Blue Jays (Rogers Communications)	Mark Shapiro (sports executive) (President)		Toronto Blue Jays
Fort Myers Mighty Mussels	West	Kaufy Baseball, LLC, John Martin	Andrew Kaufman, John Martin (took majority control in 2022)	2019/2022	Minnesota Twins
Jupiter Hammerheads	East	Miami Marlins (Jupiter Stadium Ltd)	Bruce Sherman (Marlins Owner)	2002	Miami Marlins
Lakeland Flying Tigers	West	Detroit Tigers	Ilitch Holdings (Christopher Ilitch)	1963	Detroit Tigers
Palm Beach Cardinals	East	St. Louis Cardinals (Jupiter Stadium Ltd)		2003 (founded)	St. Louis Cardinals
St. Lucie Mets	East	New York Mets	Steve Cohen (businessman) (Mets owner)	1988 (founded)	New York Mets
Tampa Tarpons	West	New York Yankees	Hal Steinbrenner (chairman; Yankees owner)	1994 (founded)	New York Yankees

== See also ==
- List of Major League Baseball team owners
- List of International League owners
- List of Pacific Coast League owners
- List of Double-A baseball team owners
- List of High-A baseball team owners
- List of Pioneer League owners
