= List of International League principal owners =

Current International League Baseball team owners and the principal corporate entities that operate the clubs:

== List ==
Team	Founded	MLB affiliation	Owner(s)	Principal	Purchase price	Year acquired
Buffalo Bisons	1979	Toronto Blue Jays	Rich Products	Robert E. Rich Jr.	$100,000	1983
Charlotte Knights	1976	Chicago White Sox	Diamond Baseball Holdings	Pat Battle (chairman); Peter B. Freund (CEO)	Not disclosed	2024
Columbus Clippers	1977	Cleveland Guardians	Franklin County Government	Tyler Parsons (Manager hired by board of trustees)	$25,000	1977
Durham Bulls	1902	Tampa Bay Rays	Capitol Broadcasting Company	Jim Goodmon	Not disclosed	1991
Gwinnett Stripers	2009	Atlanta Braves	Diamond Baseball Holdings	Pat Battle (chairman); Peter B. Freund (CEO)	Not disclosed	2021
Indianapolis Indians	1902	Pittsburgh Pirates	Indians, Inc.	Bruce Schumacher	$205,200	1955
Iowa Cubs	1969	Chicago Cubs	Diamond Baseball Holdings	Pat Battle (chairman); Peter B. Freund (CEO)	Not disclosed	2021
Jacksonville Jumbo Shrimp	1962	Miami Marlins	Prospector Baseball Group	John Abbamondi and Ben Boyer	Not disclosed	2025
Lehigh Valley IronPigs	2008	Philadelphia Phillies	Joseph Finley and Craig Stein	Joseph Finley and Craig Stein	Not disclosed	2008
Louisville Bats	1982	Cincinnati Reds	Diamond Baseball Holdings	Pat Battle (chairman); Peter B. Freund (CEO)	Not disclosed	2023
Memphis Redbirds	1998	St. Louis Cardinals	Diamond Baseball Holdings	Pat Battle (chairman); Peter B. Freund (CEO)	Not disclosed	2021
Nashville Sounds	1978	Milwaukee Brewers	MFP Baseball	Frank Ward and Masahiro Honzawa	Not disclosed	2009 (2012 restructured)
Norfolk Tides	1961	Baltimore Orioles	Diamond Baseball Holdings	Pat Battle (chairman); Peter B. Freund (CEO)	Not disclosed	2023
Omaha Storm Chasers	1969	Kansas City Royals	Diamond Baseball Holdings	Pat Battle (chairman); Peter B. Freund (CEO)	Not disclosed	2024
Rochester Red Wings	1899	Washington Nationals	Rochester Community Baseball	Morrie Silver	$500,000	1957
Scranton/Wilkes-Barre Highlanders	1989	New York Yankees	Diamond Baseball Holdings	Pat Battle (chairman); Peter B. Freund (CEO)	Not disclosed	2021
St. Paul Saints	1993	Minnesota Twins	Diamond Baseball Holdings	Pat Battle (chairman); Peter B. Freund (CEO)	Not disclosed	2023
Syracuse Mets	1934	New York Mets	Diamond Baseball Holdings	Pat Battle (chairman); Peter B. Freund (CEO)	Not disclosed	2024
Toledo Mud Hens	1965	Detroit Tigers	Toledo Mud Hens Baseball Club (a non-profit corporation)	Michael Miller (President and chairman); Joe Napoli (CEO)	Not disclosed	1965
Worcester Red Sox	2021	Boston Red Sox	Diamond Baseball Holdings	Pat Battle (chairman); Peter B. Freund (CEO)	$70M	2023

== See also ==
- List of Major League Baseball team owners
- List of Pacific Coast League owners
- List of Double-A baseball team owners
- List of High-A baseball team owners
- List of Single-A baseball team owners
- List of Pioneer League owners
