= List of Pioneer League owners =

Current Pioneer League (baseball) team owners and the principals that operate the clubs (2026):

Team	Owner(s)	Principal(s)	Year acquired
Billings Mustangs	Main Street Baseball	Dave Heller	2014
Boise Hawks	Agon Sports & Entertainment (Boise Baseball, LLC)	Jeff Eiseman, Chris Schoen	2014
Glacier Range Riders	Ridge Run Baseball LLC	Mark Kelly and Chris Kelly	2023
Great Falls Voyagers	Enbar, Inc.	Mike Hallahan (5 others)	2024
Idaho Falls Chukars	Elmore Sports Group	David Elmore Jr.	
Long Beach Coast	Long Beach Baseball Club	Warren G	2025 (founded)
Missoula PaddleHeads	Big Sky Professional Baseball	Peter and Susan Davis	2017
Modesto Roadsters	Main Street Baseball	Dave Heller	2025 (founded)
Oakland Ballers	Oakland Ballers Baseball Club, Inc.	Paul Freedman and Bryan Carmel, founders; Lon S. Hatamiya; Blair Underwood; Too Short and Billie Joe Armstrong (minority owners)	2024 (founded)
Ogden Raptors	Ogden Professional Baseball Inc.	Dave Baggott ("Baggs")	1994 (founded)
Yuba-Sutter Freebirds	Yolo High Wheelers Baseball Club, LLC	Paul Freedman and Bryan Carmel, founders; Lon S. Hatamiya	2024 (founded)

== See also ==
- List of Major League Baseball team owners
- List of International League owners
- List of Pacific Coast League owners
- List of Double-A baseball team owners
- List of High-A baseball team owners
- List of Single-A baseball team owners
