= List of Pacific Coast League principal owners =

Current Pacific Coast League team owners and the principal corporate entities that operate the clubs:

== List ==
Team	Founded	MLB affiliation	Owner(s)	Principal(s)	Purchase price	Year acquired
Albuquerque Isotopes	2003	Colorado Rockies	Diamond Baseball Holdings	Pat Battle (Chairman); Peter B. Freund (CEO)	Not disclosed	2023
El Paso Chihuahuas	2014	San Diego Padres	MountainStar Sports Group	Josh Hunt (Chairman); Alan Ledford (President)	Not disclosed	2013
Las Vegas Aviators	1983	Athletics	Seaport Entertainment Group	Anton D. Nikodemus	Not disclosed	2024 (SEG spun off from Howard Hughes Group)
Oklahoma City Comets	1962	Los Angeles Dodgers	Diamond Baseball Holdings	Pat Battle (Chairman); Peter B. Freund (CEO)	Not disclosed	2021
Reno Aces	2009	Arizona Diamondbacks	SK Baseball Group	Herb Simon	Not disclosed	2008
Round Rock Express	2000	Texas Rangers	Ryan Sanders Baseball	Nolan Ryan; Reid Ryan; Don Sanders	Not disclosed	2000
Sacramento River Cats	2000	San Francisco Giants	The Ranadive Group	Vivek Ranadivé	$90M (sold with ballpark)	2022
Salt Lake Bees	1994	Los Angeles Angels	Miller Sports + Entertainment	Gail Miller	Not disclosed	2003
Sugar Land Space Cowboys	2012	Houston Astros	Diamond Baseball Holdings	Pat Battle (Chairman); Peter B. Freund (CEO)	Not disclosed	2025
Tacoma Rainiers	1960	Seattle Mariners	The Baseball Club of Tacoma	Mikal Thomsen	Not disclosed	2011

== See also ==
- List of Major League Baseball team owners
- List of International League owners
- List of Double-A baseball team owners
- List of High-A baseball team owners
- List of Single-A baseball team owners
- List of Pioneer League owners
