= Elmore Sports Group =

Sports management company

- Industry: Sports management
- Founded: 1969; 57 years ago
- Founder: David G. Elmore, Sr.
- Key people: David G. Elmore, Jr. Doug Elmore
- Parent: Elmore Companies

Elmore Sports Group is an American sports management company, which has owned various Minor League Baseball and lower-level professional hockey teams, as well as various sports facilities.

== History ==
Elmore Sports Group was founded in 1969 and owns or has previously owned a variety of Minor League Baseball teams, professional hockey clubs, facility, concessions and special event management companies.

The company's founder, David Elmore was granted the King of Baseball award in 2016, which is an award given for long-standing dedication to professional baseball. He was previously inducted into the Pacific Coast League Hall of Fame, in 2014. He was elected to the Texas League Hall of Fame in 2016.

== Sports properties ==
=== Baseball ===
==== Current ====
Team	League	Level	Owned Stadium
Amarillo Sod Poodles	Texas League	Double-A	Hodgetown
Idaho Falls Chukars	Pioneer League	Independent League	Melaleuca Field
Eugene Emeralds	Northwest League	High-A	N/A
Rocky Mountain Vibes	Pioneer League	Independent League	Blocktickets Park
San Antonio Missions	Texas League	Double-A	Nelson W. Wolff Municipal Stadium

==== Former ====
Team	League	Level	When owned	Owned Stadium
Bakersfield Blaze	California League	Single-A	2006-2016	N/A
Birmingham Barons	Southern League	Double-A		N/A
Colorado Springs Sky Sox	Pacific Coast League	Triple-A		N/A
Hawaii Islanders	Pacific Coast League	Triple-A		N/A
Inland Empire 66ers	California League	Single-A		San Manuel Stadium
Lynchburg Hillcats	Carolina League	Single-A		N/A

=== Hockey ===
==== Current ====
Team	League	Level
Idaho Falls Spud Kings	United States Premier Hockey League	Tier II junior ice hockey

==== Former ====
Team	League	Level	When Owned
Fort Worth Fire	Central Hockey League	Mid-level minor professional hockey league	1998-1999
Richmond Renegades	ECHL	Tier 3 professional hockey league	1994-2025
San Antonio Iguanas	Central Hockey League	Mid-level minor professional hockey league	1998-2002
Utah Grizzlies(founded as Denver Grizzlies) (originally owned as Tallahassee Tiger Sharks)	ECHL	Tier 3 professional hockey league	1994-2025
Utah Grizzlies (1995–2005)	American Hockey League (previously International Hockey League)		1995-2006

=== Soccer ===
==== Former ====
Team	League	Level
Lane United FC (through Redside Sports LLC)	USL League Two	Fourth Tier
SoCal SC	NPSL	Fourth Tier
Tallahassee Scorpions	EISL	Indoor
Utah Freezz	World Indoor Soccer League	Indoor

=== Arena football ===
==== Former ====
Team	League	Level
Tallahassee Thunder	AF2	Arena Football League development league
