= Arctos =

Arctos is Ancient Greek for bear. Arctos may refer to:

- Ursus arctos, the brown bear
- Arctos Partners, an American sports Management Group and Private equity fund
