= Ebbets Field Flannels =

American reproduction vintage clothing manufacturer

- Industry: Textile
- Founded: 1988; 38 years ago
- Founder: Jerry Cohen
- Headquarters: New York City, New York, U.S.
- Area served: Worldwide
- Products: T-shirts, jerseys, jacket, hats
- Parent: Lids
- Website: ebbets.com

Ebbets Field Flannels, Inc is an American vintage athletic apparel clothing brand. The company was established in 1988 and was headquartered in Seattle, Washington. It is now headquartered in New York City. The company is known for its reproduction of historical baseball caps and wool flannel jerseys, primarily those of defunct minor league teams, teams from the Pacific Coast League, and Negro league teams.

One of the company's signature design elements is a green satin under-visor on their caps.

== History ==
Ebbets Field Flannels was founded by Jerry Cohen in 1988. The company's first run of caps were replicas of the Pacific Coast League's San Francisco Seals and Seattle Rainiers. The company ran their first advertisement in 1988, in an issue of Baseball America.

In 2016, 7th Inning Stretch LLC purchased a minority stake in the company.

In November 2022, the company was acquired by Lids for an undisclosed amount.

The company changed its website in March 2025, dropped licensing for NFL teams, and has reduced the size of their inventory dramatically. Sunny Chang, design director for Ebbets Field Flannels reassured customers that many pieces will return in the future saying, “We’re bringing a lot of old stuff back. We haven’t replenished it in a while and we know our customers come to us for that.”

Alongside this change, prices increased dramatically while quality decreased with no announcement to consumers on these changes. The company's cornerstone 100% wool jerseys changed to a 50% wool and 50% polyester (plastic fiber) blend with an increase from a base price of $215 to $298. The former 100% wool hats changed to 85% wool and 15% nylon with a price increase from $54 to $68. Cotton T-Shirts that were originally $34 dollars changed to $58.

== Operations ==
Ebbets Field Flannels was commissioned by the producers of the 2013 film 42 to recreate the minor league and Negro league uniforms worn in the film. Teams included the Montreal Royals, Kansas City Monarchs, Birmingham Black Barons, Jersey City Giants, St. Paul Saints, and Indianapolis Indians. On July 16, 2015, the Negro Leagues Baseball Museum and Ebbets Field Flannels announced a new agreement to exclusively bear the "Authentic Black Diamond Collection" label.
