= Temerity Baseball =

Sports management company

- Industry: Sports management
- Founded: 2018; 8 years ago
- Founder: Andy Sandler
- Headquarters: Washington D.C.
- Website: https://www.temeritycap.com/pages/temerity-baseball/

Temerity Baseball is a subsidiary of Temerity Capital Partners, which owns and managers several minor league baseball teams as well as minority ownership in the Tampa Bay Rays. They are headquartered in Washington, D.C.

== History ==
Andy Sandler is the founder and CEO of Temerity Baseball.

In October 2018, Temerity purchased the Kannapolis Cannon Ballers, a Single-A minor league baseball team in the Carolina League, an affiliate of the Chicago White Sox. The team was previously known as the Kannapolis Intimidators. Temerity also owns the Cannon Ballers' home stadium, Atrium Health Ballpark.

In January 2022, Temerity acquired the Greensboro Grasshoppers, a High-A baseball team in the South Atlantic League, affiliated with the Pittsburgh Pirates. The Grasshoppers were acquired from Greensboro Baseball LLC along with the Grasshoppers' home stadium, First National Bank Field.

In January 2024, Temerity purchased the Lexington Legends of the Atlantic League of Professional Baseball, an independent minor league baseball team. The team was acquired from Nashville investors, Nathan and Keri Lyons, who had changed the name to the Lexington Counter Clocks the year before. Temerity also owns the home stadium, Legends Field.

In October 2025, Temerity joined a limited partnership group for a minority interest in the Tampa Bay Rays. The partnership group included investors connected to the Tampa Bay area such as NBA player Shane Battier, Mike Salvino, and Terry Bellinger.

== Teams ==
Team	League	Year acquired	Notes
Greensboro Grasshoppers	South Atlantic League (High-A)	2022	
Kannapolis Cannon Ballers	Carolina League (Single-A)	2018	
Lexington Legends	Atlantic League of Professional Baseball	2024	
Tampa Bay Rays	Major League Baseball	2025	Minority stake
