= Joe Cannon (baseball) =

American baseball player (born 1953)

- Outfielder
- Born: July 13, 1953 (age 72); Camp Lejeune, North Carolina, U.S.
- Batted: Left Threw: Right

MLB debut
- September 22, 1977, for the Houston Astros

Last appearance
- October 5, 1980, for the Toronto Blue Jays

MLB statistics
- Batting average: .176
- Home runs: 1
- Runs batted in: 11
- Stats at Baseball Reference

Teams
- Houston Astros (1977–1978); Toronto Blue Jays (1979–1980)

Joseph Jerome Cannon (born July 13, 1953) is an American former outfielder in Major League Baseball. Born in Camp Lejeune, North Carolina, Cannon was a first round draft pick by the Houston Astros in 1974 out of Pensacola Junior College (now Pensacola State College). Cannon spent parts of four seasons in the majors with the Astros and the Toronto Blue Jays.

Upon his retirement as a player, Cannon became a minor league coach and manager. He managed for 11 seasons in the Toronto, Atlanta, and Houston organizations, taking the Lexington Legends to their first championship in their inaugural season in 2001. His most recent baseball job, 2007-2009, was as the field coach for the Frederick Keys, the Carolina League affiliate of the Baltimore Orioles. In 2015 he was working at the Kentucky Methodist Group Home in Versailles, Kentucky, mentoring teenage boys. Cannon usually appears on baseball cards as "J.J. Cannon."
