= Main Street Baseball =

Owners of Minor League Baseball teams

Main Street Baseball (MSB or Main Street) is an American sports ownership and management group that operates four Minor League Baseball (MiLB) teams in the United States. The company is headquartered in Davenport, Iowa and is owned by Dave Heller.

== History ==
Main Street Baseball was founded in 2007 by Dave Heller. Main Street purchased the Quad Cities River Bandits after the end of the 2007 season. In November 2010, Main Street Baseball purchased the High Desert Mavericks (dissolved in 2016). In December 2014, the company purchased a majority interest in the Wilmington Blue Rocks and the Billings Mustangs. They bought the Lowell Spinners in May 2016 (and sold the team in 2020). Finally, Main Street purchased the Modesto Roadsters in 2025, which team will be premiering in the Pioneer League beginning in the 2026 season.

== Teams ==
Current

Team	League	Level	Year acquired	Affiliate
Billings Mustangs	Pioneer League	Independent League (MLB partner)	2014	None
Modesto Roadsters	Pioneer League	Independent League (MLB partner)	2025	None
Quad Cities River Bandits	Midwest League	High-A	2007	Kansas City Royals
Wilmington Blue Rocks	South Atlantic League	High-A	2014	Washington Nationals

Former

Team	League	Level	Years owned
High Desert Mavericks	California League	Class A-Advanced	2010-2016
Lowell Spinners	New York–Penn League	Short-Season A	2016-2020

== Awards ==
In 2016, Ballpark Digest named Main Street Baseball as the "Minor League Organization of the Year."

=== Billings Mustangs ===
The Mustangs won the Pioneer League's McCurdy Cup in 2019 and 2022. The 2019 cup was the inaugural year for the award. The award honors the Pioneer League team that best gives back to their community in their area.

The Billings Mustangs won the Davey Award in 2023, winning the silver prize for corporate/brand identity for the rebrand of the Mustangs. The award is presented by the Academy of Interactive & Visual Arts and is an international creative award and is meant to honor small agencies that excel in the creative arts in their businesses.

In 2016, Ballpark Digest named Dehler Park, the home stadium of the Mustangs, as the country's best Rookie League ballpark.

=== Quad Cities River Bandits ===
In 2008 and 2009, the River Bandits won ESPN's Veeckie Award for the best Minor League promotion. In 2009, they also won the United States Army's Gold Award for community service.

The River Bandits won Ballpark Digest's Charity award in 2015, 2017, and 2019. They were the inaugural winner of the award in 2015.

In 2017, the Pioneer League gave the team the Fields of Excellence award.

Barstool Digest awarded the team as the 2018 Marketing TV Spot of the Year for their "Kid Approved" ad.

In 2021, the Quad Cities River Bandits were named by Ballpark Digest as the Minor League Team of the Year as a result of their winning the championship that year, increasing their attendance, and for their charitable efforts off the field.

In 2022, the Kansas City Royals honored Dave Heller with the Matt Minker award, which recognizes an employee in the Royals minor league system that best exemplifies leadership and dedication to the organization.

In 2021 and 2022, the Quad-Cities River Times gave Main Street several awards. In 2021, the team won the Readers Choice awards for "Best Place to Take an Out of Town Guest" and "Best Sports Team." In 2022, the team won the Readers Choice awards for "Best Family Entertainment" and "Best Sports Team."

==== Modern Woodmen Park ====
In 2011, Bleacher Report named Modern Woodmen Park, the Quad Cities River Bandits's stadium, one of the top 25 ballparks in the United States. They also won the award in 2018 (number 17 on the list).

In 2013, Parade Magazine named Modern Woodmen Park one of the two most beautiful ballparks and one of the top 10 best ballparks in the United States. Trekaroo mentioned Modern Woodman Park as the number 1 kid friendly park in Iowa. Barstool Digest awarded the team/stadium the Best Ballpark Improvement Under $1 Million award.

In 2014, USA Today named Modern Woodmen Park the "best minor league ballpark in America." They also won the award in 2023, 2024, and 2025.

In 2014, the Cleat Report also referenced the stadium as the coolest stadium in baseball. Baseball Digest also named the ferris wheel at the ballpark the best improvement of the year.

In 2015, Livability named Modern Woodmen Park as one of the top 10 Minor League stadiums. Ballpark Digest named the stadium the best Single-A ballpark.

In 2017, Baseball Digest awarded the team/stadium the Best Ballpark Improvement Under $1 Million award.

=== Wilmington Blue Rocks ===
From 2013 to 2018, the Wilmington Blue Rocks were awarded the Matt Minker Community Service Award.
