= Modern Woodmen Park =

Baseball stadium in Davenport, Iowa, U.S.

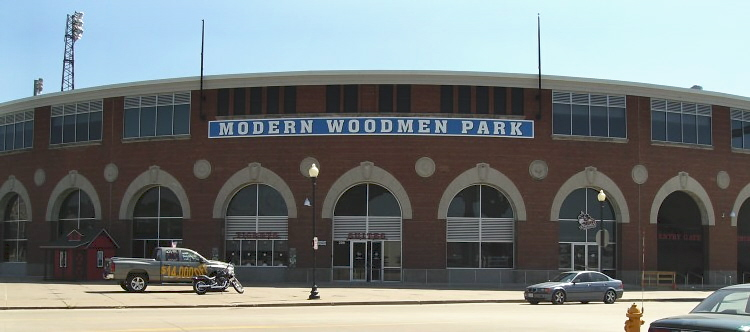

- Location within Iowa Location within the United States
- Former names: Municipal Stadium (1931–1971); John O'Donnell Stadium (1971–2007)
- Location: 209 South Gaines Street; Davenport, IA 52802
- Coordinates: 41°31′7.21″N 90°34′56.07″W
- Owner: City of Davenport
- Operator: Main Street Baseball
- Capacity: ? (1931–1940s); 6,200 (1940s–1961); 8,500 (1962–1988); 5,200 (1989–2003); 4,024 (2004–present)
- Surface: Grass
- Field size: Left field: 343 feet (105 m); Left center field: 383 feet Center field: 400 feet (102 m); Right center field: 370 feet Right field: 318 feet (97 m)
- Public transit: Davenport CitiBus

Construction
- Groundbreaking: November 6, 1930
- Opened: May 26, 1931
- Renovated: 1989, 2004
- Cost: $185,000 (1931) ($3.92 million in 2025 dollars) $12.5 million (2004 renovation)
- Architects: Clausen, Kruse & Klein (original); Populous (1989, 1999, 2004 renovations)
- General contractor: Tunnicliff Construction Company

Tenants
- Baseball; Quad Cities River Bandits (MWL) (1931–present); Football; Assumption High School (–1987); St. Ambrose Fighting Bees (NAIA) (–1987)

Modern Woodmen Park (known previously as John O'Donnell Stadium and Municipal Stadium) is a minor league baseball venue located in Davenport, Iowa. It is home to the Quad Cities River Bandits, the Midwest League affiliate of the Kansas City Royals. The St. Ambrose University baseball team has played games there since 1987 and it is where all practices and home games are currently held. Located on the banks of the Mississippi River, in the shadow of the Centennial Bridge, home run balls to right field often land in the river.

== History ==
Before construction of the park, Davenport teams played at the Mississippi Valley Fairgrounds, without lights. As night games became more necessary, the city of Davenport decided a new venue was necessary. Proposed by the Davenport Levee Commission, Municipal Stadium opened May 26, 1931, within LeClaire Park. The ballpark was built at a cost of $185,000 and is situated in the downtown area along the Mississippi River. The first night game was June 4, 1931.

Expansions in the 1940s and in 1962 brought capacity up to 6,200 and 8,500 respectively. It is one of the oldest ballparks still in use in all of the minor leagues, although it underwent a major renovation before the 1989 season, lowering the seating capacity to 5,200 and before the 2004 season that brought the ballpark up to modern professional baseball standards and a seating capacity of 4,024.

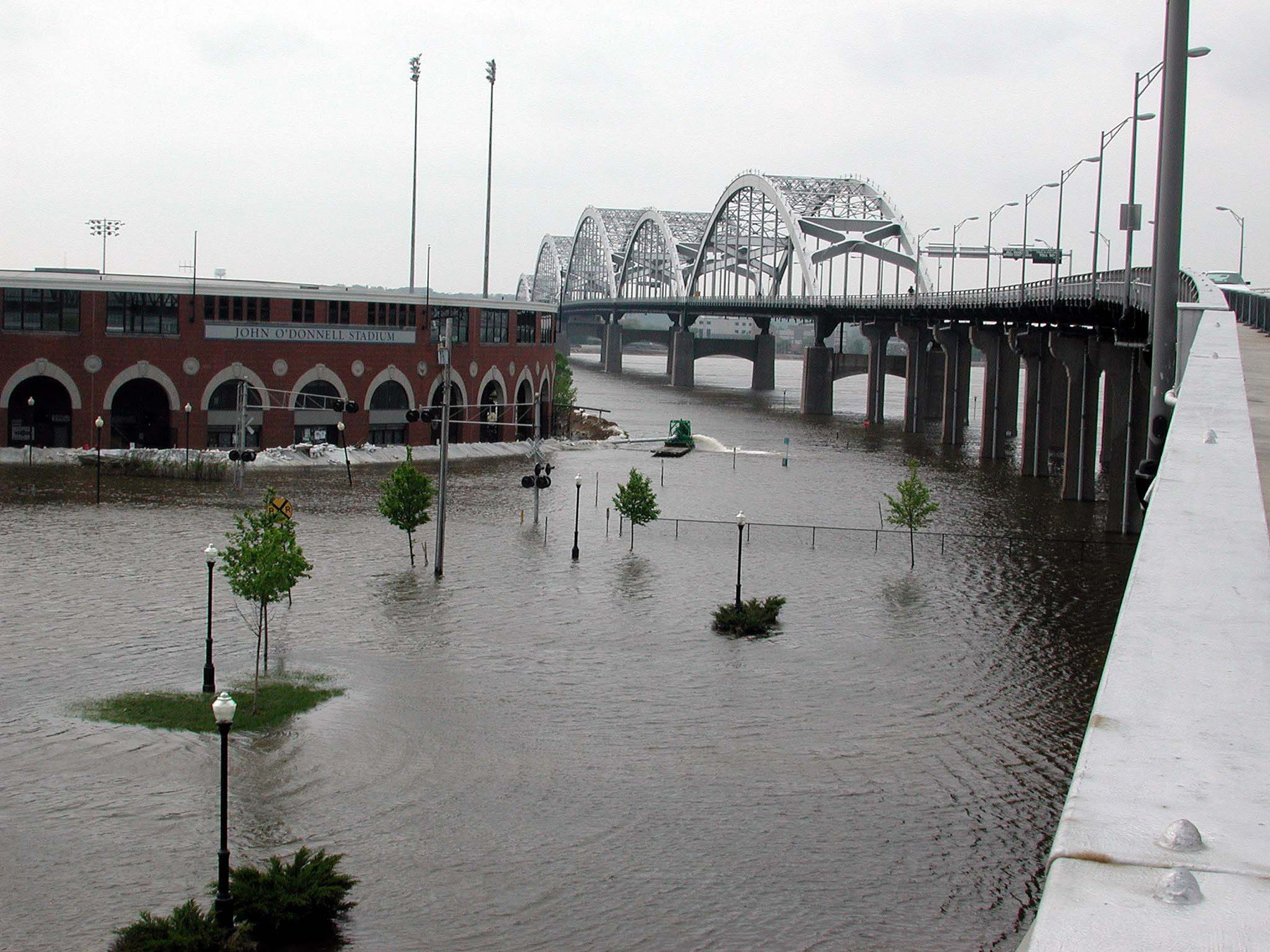
John O'Donnell Stadium, May 5, 2001, with the Mississippi River flooding the surroundings

On May 27, 1971, the stadium was renamed John O'Donnell Stadium in honor of the longtime sports editor of the Davenport Times-Democrat, shortly following his death. John O'Donnell Stadium was renamed Modern Woodmen Park on December 12, 2007, after Rock Island-based Modern Woodmen of America purchased the naming rights to the facility. O'Donnell's name remains on the ballpark's press box.

== Football tenants ==
For many years, Modern Woodmen Park hosted football games in the fall. Both Assumption High School (a private Catholic high school in Davenport) and Saint Ambrose College called the field home until 1987, when both schools began playing at Brady Street Stadium in 1988. The football bleachers and press box along left field were removed in 1989.

== 2000s–present renovations ==
Renovations done before the 2004 season included a nine-foot-high berm that provided a lawn seating area for fans. The berm also acted as a flood wall around the entire stadium. Until that point, the facility had no protection from Mississippi River flooding, which caused the team to play home games at other parks during river floods. During the Great Flood of 1993, photos of water creeping across the playing field at the ballpark made national publications and became somewhat of a symbol of the flood. In spring 2019, the surrounding area was flooded but the ballpark remained above water.

After the 2007 season, new owners Dave Heller and Bob Herrfeldt of Main Street Baseball reinvigorated both the ballpark and the franchise. They sold naming rights to Modern Woodmen in a record 20-year deal, changed the name of the franchise back to "River Bandits", and made numerous improvements to the ballpark. In 2008, the club added a hot tub deck in right field, as well as a "tiki village", featuring three tiki bars, a covered tiki lounge, and a king-sized tiki bed beyond the right field wall. They also excavated a gravel area along the left-field foul line and planted field corn; by mid-season the corn grows high enough so that the home-team players are introduced at the beginning of the game and come running out of the corn field, just like in the movie Field of Dreams.

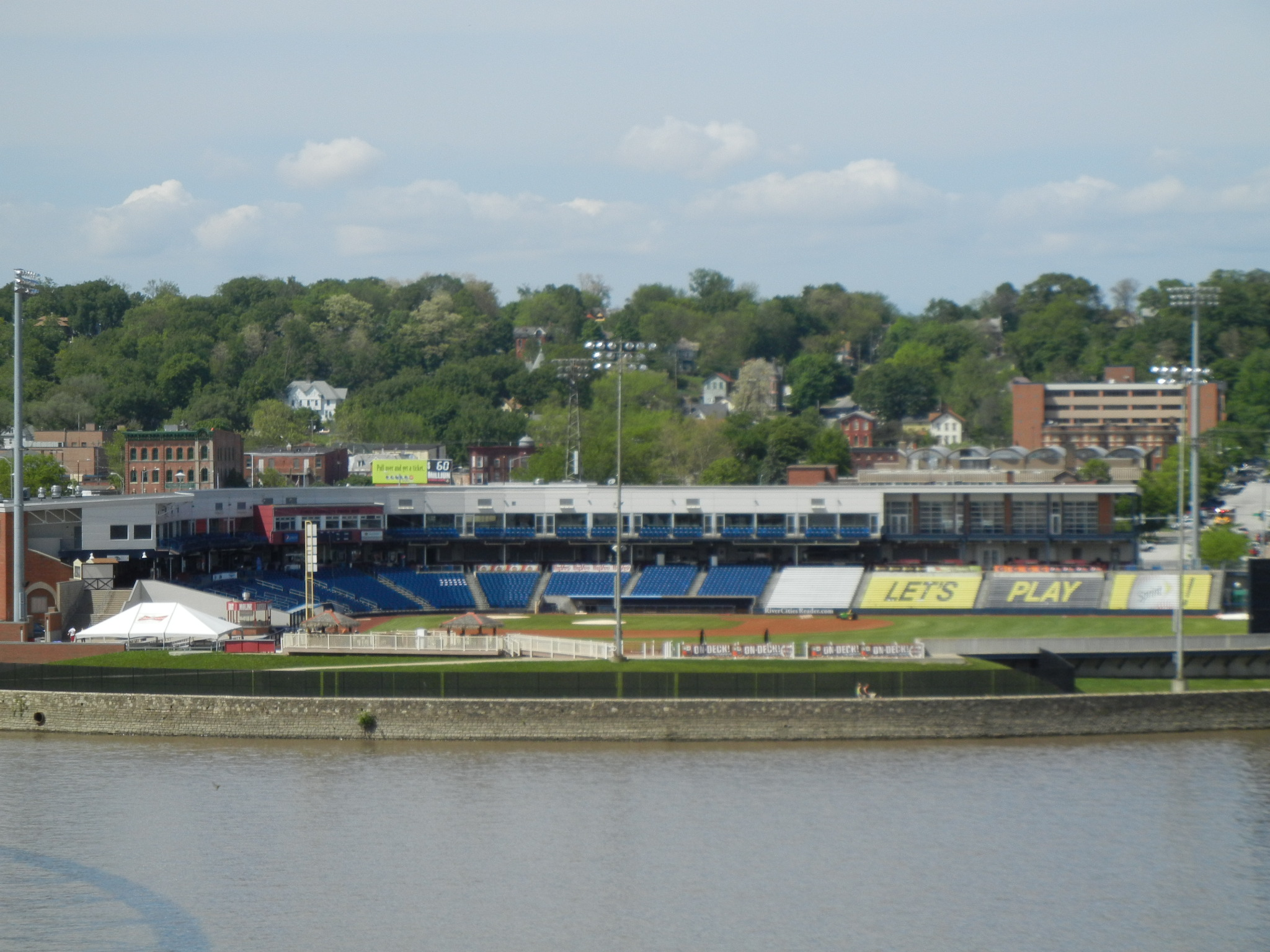
Modern Woodmen Park from the Centennial Bridge

For 2009, Main Street Baseball continued to make improvements, adding a new 80-foot-long (24 m), 6-foot-tall (1.8 m) HD ribbon board along the right field fence and installing four new concourse-level "loge boxes" to accommodate small groups of people. Prior to the 2010 season, the City of Davenport and Main Street Baseball replaced the entire field, to facilitate proper drainage and minimize rain-outs. Other changes for 2010 included a new concession stand on the Picnic Plaza level and a new group terrace next to the Tiki Village beyond the right-center field fence.

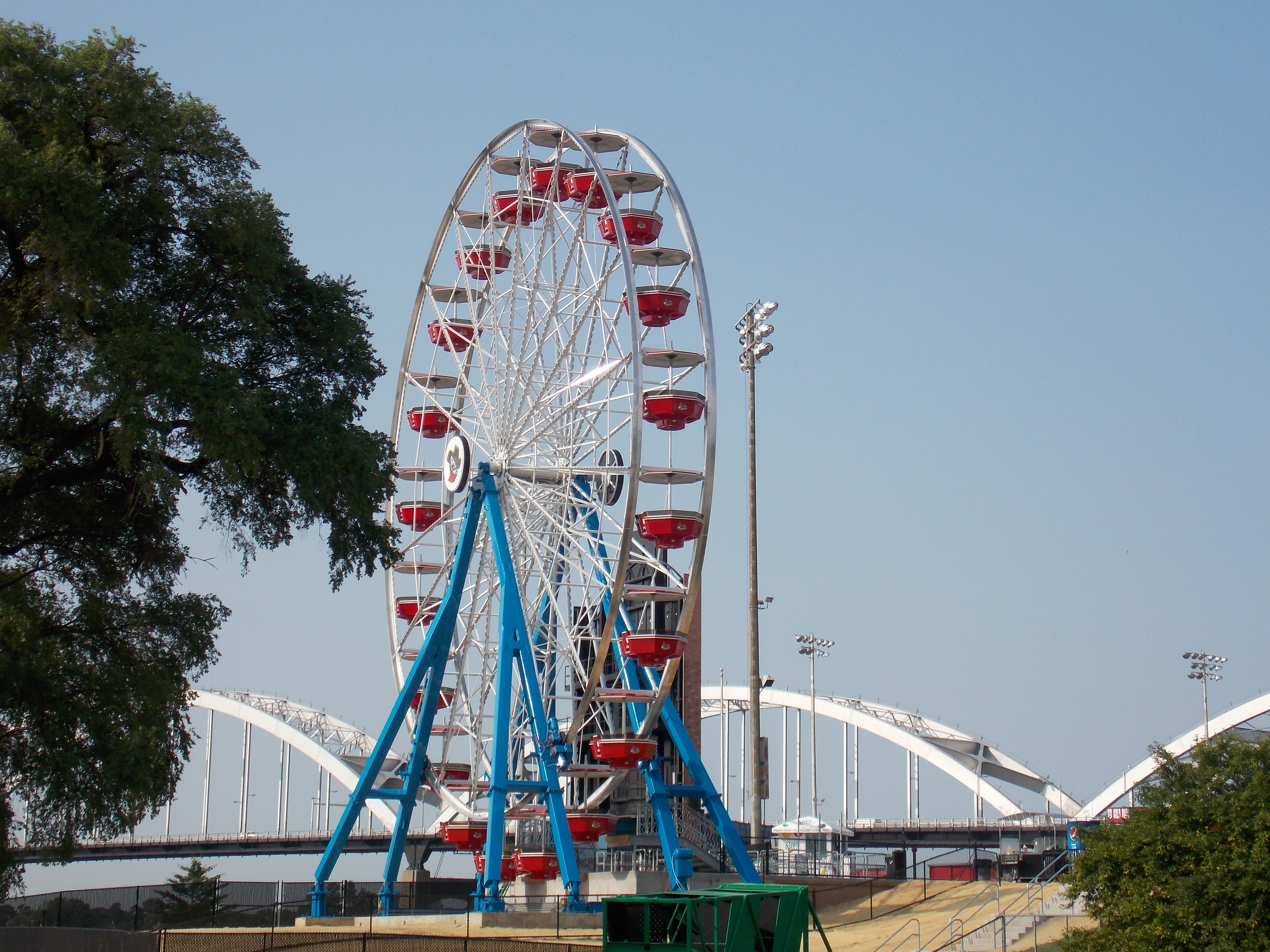
Modern Woodmen Park Ferris wheel, 2014

In 2014, the facility received another addition, as a 110-foot (34 m) Ferris wheel was constructed just beyond the left field wall. In 2017, the park added a double-decker carousel purchased from Pier 39 in San Francisco.

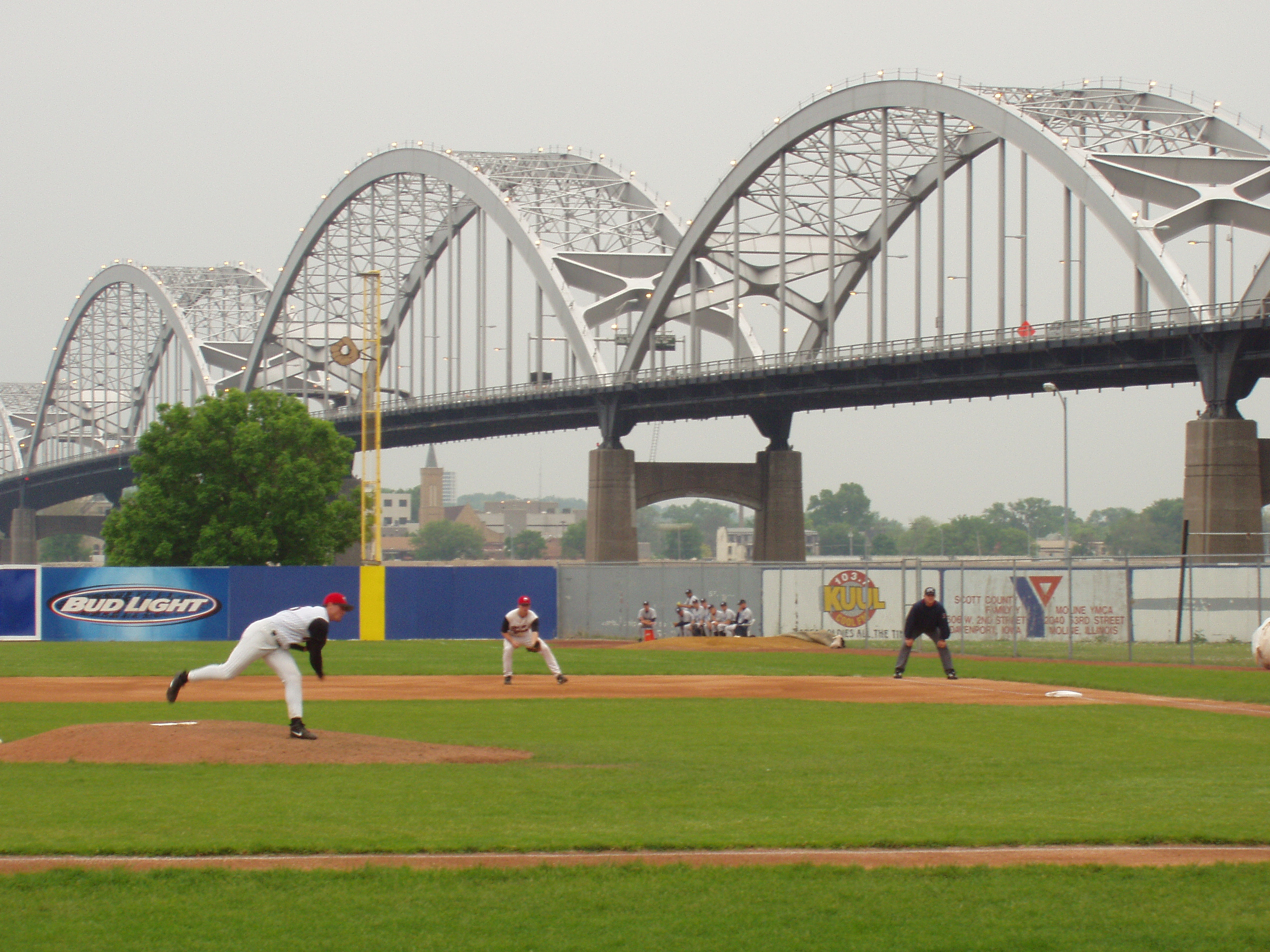
Joshua Hill pitch, Centennial Bridge from the Ballpark 2003

== Awards ==
For both the 2008 and 2009 seasons, Modern Woodmen Park won the "Best Ballpark Improvement" Award from Ballparkdigest.com, the industry's leading publication.

In 2013, the park was voted as the top minor-league ballpark in the United States in a USA Today and 10best.com reader poll. Modern Woodmen Park beat second place Louisville Slugger Field by around 2,000 votes.

In 2018, Modern Woodmen Park finished third in the "Best View in the Minors" competition, finishing behind El Paso's Southwest University Park and Altoona's Peoples Natural Gas Field.

== Notable events ==
The River Bandits (then known as the Swing of the Quad Cities) defeated the Burlington Bees, 1–0, in the first game at the renovated Modern Woodmen Park on April 29, 2004.

The 2006 and 2011 Midwest League All-Star Games were held at Modern Woodmen Park. Previously, the ballpark hosted Midwest League All-Star Games in 1964, 1968, 1975, 1980, 1982 and 1990, giving the facility a total of eight.

In summer 2007, portions of the film Sugar were shot at the park. This included 800–1,000 people a night showing up to be extras. The movie follows the path of a young man from the impoverished Dominican Republic as he chases dreams of baseball stardom in America.

The stadium was the site of the "Rumble on the Riverbank" boxing match on May 10, 1991. Michael Nunn, a Davenport native, lost the IBF middleweight title to James Toney.

"Mississippi River Jam II" was held on June 3, 1979, featuring AC/DC, Heart, UFO TKO and Nazareth.

The facility has hosted concerts artists such as Johnny Cash, The Beach Boys, Johnny Winter, Bryan Adams, Def Leppard, REO Speedwagon, Blue Öyster Cult, Eddie Money, Edgar Winter Group and Lonestar. Johnny Cash played at the stadium twice, in 1974 and 1976, drawing over 10,000 each time and playing for free.

On October 1, 1936, an exhibition game featuring major-league players and Negro National League All Stars included Baseball Hall of Fame players Satchel Paige, Cool Papa Bell, Rogers Hornsby and Johnny Mize.

== Media ==
The stadium and teams were the subject of a book. Baseball historian Tim Rask wrote Baseball at Davenport's John O'Donnell Stadium, released in 2004.
