= John Abbamondi =

National Basketball Association executive

Brooklyn Nets
- Positions: Chief executive officer & alternate governor
- League: NBA

Personal information
- Born: Choctaw, Oklahoma

John Abbamondi is the former chief executive officer of the Brooklyn Nets, Barclays Center, the Long Island Nets, and the Nets Gaming Crew of the NBA 2K League. Abbamondi also was alternate governor for the Brooklyn Nets.

== Early life and career ==
Abbamondi grew up in Choctaw, Oklahoma. Abbamondi graduated from MIT with B.S. degree in political science in 1993. While attending MIT, Abbamondi was class president and a member of the Naval Reserve Officers Training Corps. Abbamondi also received an MBA from Stanford Graduate School of Business in 2004.

Prior to joining Joseph Tsai's BSE Global, Abbamondi worked for the US Navy (1993–2002) as lieutenant/naval flight officer, Major League Baseball (2004–07) under Bud Selig as senior director of labor economics, St. Louis Cardinals (2007–10) as assistant general manager, San Diego Padres as VP of strategy & business analysis,

National Basketball Association as SVP of team marketing & business operations (2013–16) in NYC, and Madison Square Garden Entertainment (2016–20) as EVP of ticketing/suites/hospitality. Abbamondi is a former board member (2011–12) for the USO San Diego.

During his time with the MLB, Abbamondi helped negotiate the Basic Agreement (2006–2011) with the MLB Players Association, and played a pivotal role in the restructuring of the MLB's revenue-sharing system. Additionally, Abbamondi was a member of the Revenue Sharing Definitions Committee, with a focus on the valuation of broadcast rights fee agreements. Also, Abbamondi participated in collective bargaining discussions regarding MLB/union economic initiatives with the Players Association and the Umpires Association.

== Brooklyn Nets ==
On July 28, 2020, Abbamondi was named CEO of BSE Global, the parent company of the Brooklyn Nets, Barclays Center, the Long Island Nets, and the NetsGC. Abbamondi would replace Oliver Weisberg, who acted as interim CEO during the previous year.

Abbamondi said, "I am thrilled and honored to be joining BSE Global and working with our ownership. New York has been my home for much of my adult life, and I know first-hand the passion New Yorkers have for their sports teams. It is the honor of a lifetime to have the opportunity to lead the Nets franchise, Barclays Center and BSE Global's other properties into this exciting new chapter of their history."

On February 1, 2022, Abbamondi abruptly resigned his position with BSE Global effective July 2022. The New York Post reported that BSE Global owner Joe Tsai felt Abbamondi "was not innovative or data-driven enough."

== Prospector Baseball Group ==
In October 2025, Abbamondi established Prospector Baseball Group along with tech founder/investor Ben Boyer. They have three Minor League Baseball teams under their ownership thus far, including the Akron RubberDucks; Jacksonville Jumbo Shrimp; and the Lancaster Stormers. In December 2025, Abbamondi and PBG were able to acquire a strategic/financial partnership with Arctos Partners.

== See also ==
- List of National Basketball Association team presidents
