= Lexington Legends =

Professional baseball team

Logo
Cap insignia

Information
- League: Atlantic League of Professional Baseball (South Division)
- Location: Lexington, Kentucky
- Ballpark: Common Sprit Field (2001–)
- Founded: 2001
- League championships: 2001; 2018; 2019; 2021
- Division championships: 2001; 2018; 2019; 2021
- Former name: Lexington Legends (2001–2022); Lexington Counter Clocks (2023)
- Former league: South Atlantic League (2001–2020)
- Former ballpark: Legends Field (2001–2026)
- Colors: Blue, green, silver, white
- Ownership: Temerity Baseball
- General manager: Justin Ferrarella
- Manager: Paul Fletcher
- Website: lexingtonlegends.com

The Lexington Legends are an American professional baseball team based in Lexington, Kentucky. They are a member of the South Division of the Atlantic League of Professional Baseball, a "partner league" of Major League Baseball. The Legends have played their home games at CommonSpirit Ballpark since 2001. The team was known as the Lexington Counter Clocks during the 2023 season before reinstating their original name in 2024.

== History ==
The Class-A Kissimmee Cobras of the Florida State League contracted following the 2000 season; the Lexington Legends were established as an expansion franchise in the South Atlantic League in 2001 and assumed the Houston Astros affiliation from the Cobras.

The 2001 season began under manager J. J. Cannon. The team finished their first regular season with 92 wins and 48 losses and first place in the sixteen-team South Atlantic League. In the postseason, the Legends defeated the Hagerstown Suns in the first round and advanced to play the Asheville Tourists in the League Championship Series. However, the series was canceled after the Legends won the first two games due to the September 11 attacks, and the Legends were declared co-champions after having gone up 2–0 before game three was canceled.

Cannon returned to manage in 2002 and led the team to another winning record, but the Legends failed to qualify for the playoffs. Lexington returned to the playoffs in 2003 but was defeated by the Lake County Captains in the first round. In 2004, the Legends finished with a record of 68–72, their first losing record in team history. The following season, the Legends posted an 81–58 regular season record and finished in first place under manager Tim Bogar.

=== Roger Clemens ===
On May 31, 2006, Roger Clemens announced that he would come out of retirement to pitch for the Houston Astros for the remainder of the 2006 season. Clemens, planning to keep himself to a strict 60-pitch limit, returned to baseball with the Legends, where his oldest son Koby played. Father and son denied reports that Koby would catch his dad for the return. "He doesn't listen to me," Roger Clemens said. "We'd be shaking each other off and arguing too much." In his first game, Clemens threw 62 pitches, allowed no walks, and only one run while striking out 6 batters in three innings of work with the Legends, who won the game 5–1.

=== Joe Mikulik incident ===
The team received national attention again in 2006 following a controversial game against the Asheville Tourists on June 25. In the fifth inning of the game, Tourists manager Joe Mikulik went on an extended tirade after being ejected from the game following an argument with an umpire. The event received coverage on various television programs, including NBC's The Tonight Show, ESPN's Pardon the Interruption and SportsCenter, and MSNBC's Countdown with Keith Olbermann. Roger Clemens' appearance as a Legend and Joe Mikulik's meltdown are chronicled in the 2011 documentary film Legendary: When Baseball Came to the Bluegrass.

=== 2021 and beyond ===
The Lexington Legends were one of the minor league teams that lost MLB affiliation under a new plan by MLB. On February 18, 2021, the team announced that it would be joining the Atlantic League of Professional Baseball, an independent MLB Partner league, for the 2021 season.

On October 28, 2022, the team and their ballpark were sold to Nathan and Keri Lyons.

=== 2023 name change ===
It was announced March 6, 2023, that the team was changing its name to the Lexington Counter Clocks. For that season, their ballpark was known as Counter Clocks Field.

=== 2024 sale and name change ===
It was announced January 25, 2024, that the team had been sold to Temerity Baseball along with several local investors. On February 15, 2024, it was announced the team would be renamed back to the Lexington Legends.

== Branding and mascots ==
Logo of the Counter Clocks (2023)

The Legends' mascot from 2001 to 2022 was Big L, a mustachioed baseball player caricature. His best friend was Pee Wee, another team mascot. The team's colors were blue, green, and yellow.

Along with its new name, in 2023 the Lexington Counter Clocks introduced two new mascots: Hoss, a horse that races to the left, and Dinger, a clock swinging a bat. The team's colors are now blue, red, and white.

Along with the name change announced on February 15, 2024, a new mascot was introduced: Mighty Lex, a baseball with arms, legs, and the same mustache worn by past mascot Big L.

== Season-by-season results ==
Since its inception, the Lexington franchise has played 22 seasons, initially in the South Atlantic League (2001–2019) and later in the Atlantic League of Professional Baseball (2021–present). As of the completion of the 2022 season, the club had played in 2,886 regular season games and compiled a record of 1,400–1,486 for a .485 winning percentage. The team postseason record was 19–8.

League champions †	Post-season Berth ♦

Season	Manager	Record^{[a]}	Win %	League^{[b]}	Division^{[c]}	GB^{[d]}	Post-season record^{[e]}	Post-season win %	Result	MLB/League affiliate
2001 †	Joe Cannon	92–48	.657	1st	1st	–	4–0	1.000	Won division series vs Hagerstown Suns, 2–0; Led Asheville Tourists 2–0 in League Championship Series; Declared Co-League Champions^{[f]}	Houston
2002	Joe Cannon	81–59	.579	2nd	2nd	2½	–	–	–	Houston
2003 ♦	Russ Nixon	75–63	.543	7th	2nd	25	0–2	.000	Lost division series vs Lake County Captains, 0–2	Houston
2004	Iván DeJesús	68–72	.486	10th	7th	17	–	–	–	Houston
2005	Tim Bogar	81–58	.583	1st	1st	—	–	–	–	Houston
2006 ♦	Jack Lind	75–63	.543	5th	3rd	8½	0–2	.000	Lost division series vs Lakewood BlueClaws, 0–2	Houston
2007	Gregg Langbehn	59–81	.421	13th	7th	25	–	–	–	Houston
2008	Gregg Langbehn	45–93	.326	16th	8th	34	–	–	–	Houston
2009	Tom Lawless	68–72	.486	9th	5th	8½	–	–	–	Houston
2010	Rodney Linares	71–68	.511	6th	4th	8½	–	–	–	Houston
2011	Rodney Linares	59–79	.428	12th	6th	19½	–	–	–	Houston
2012	Iván DeJesús	69–69	.500	7th	4th	18	–	–	–	Houston
2013	Brian Buchanan	68–70	.493	8th	6th/4th	9.5/10	–	–	–	Kansas City
2014	Brian Buchanan	57–83	.407	11th	6th/6th	17/20.5	–	–	–	Kansas City
2015	Omar Ramirez	58–80	.420	12th	6th	26.5	–	–	–	Kansas City
2016	Omar Ramirez	52–87	.374	13th	7th		–	–	–	Kansas City
2017	Scott Thorman	62–75	.453	12th	6th	16	–	–	–	Kansas City
2018 †	Scott Thorman	76–60	.559	2nd	1st	-	5–1	.833	Won division series vs Rome Braves 2–0; Won League Championship Series vs Lakewood BlueClaws 3–1; League Champions	Kansas City
2019 †	Brooks Conrad	68–70	.493	7th	3rd	9	5–1	.833	Won division series vs Augusta Greenjackets 2–0; Won League Championship Series vs Hickory Crawdads 3–1; League Champions	Kansas City
2020	Season cancelled due to COVID-19 pandemic									
2021 †	P. J. Phillips	60–60	.500	4th	2nd	4.5	5–2	.714	Won division series vs Charleston Dirty Birds 2–1; Won League Championship Series vs Long Island Ducks 3–1; League Champions	Atlantic League of Professional Baseball
2022	P. J. Phillips	56–76	.424	7th	4th	32	–	–	–	Atlantic League of Professional Baseball
2023	Barry Lyons	49–75	.4395	9th	5th	29	–	–	–	Atlantic League of Professional Baseball

=== Notes ===
- ^{a} This column indicates overall wins and losses during the regular season and excludes any postseason play.
- ^{b} This column indicates overall position in the league standings.
- ^{c} This column indicates overall position in the divisional standings[split seasons for 2013 and 2014].
- ^{d} Determined by finding the difference in wins plus the difference in losses divided by two, this column indicates "games behind" the team that finished in overall first place in the division [split seasons for 2013 and 2014].
- ^{e} This column indicates wins and losses during the postseason.
- ^{f} Due to the September 11 attacks, the 2001 best-of-five League Championship Series against Asheville was cancelled. Asheville and Lexington were declared SAL Co-Champions.

== Roster ==
Lexington Legends roster
Active (25-man) roster	Coaching staff
Pitchers: 3 Simon Gregersen; 12 Jack Lynch; 22 Brian Zeldin; 25 Jimmy Loper; 29 John Armstrong; 30 Carson Lambert; 31 Jonathan Haab; 32 Nic Laio; 33 Patrick Wicklander; Catchers: 13 Jerry Huntzinger; Infielders: -- Mason Dinesen; 11 Andy Atwood; 23 Brian Fuentes; 28 Curtis Terry; Outfielders: 8 EJ Cumbo; 9 Ryan McCarthy; 10 Ronnie Dawson; 27 Dylan Rock; 6 Xane Washington	Manager: -- Paul Fletcher; Coaches: -- Mikey Reynolds (hitting); -- Tommy Thompson (pitching); Disabled list; ‡ Inactive list; § Suspended list; Roster updated April 24, 2026 Transactions

== Lexington Legends Hall of Fame ==
The Lexington Legends honored ten past members of the organization by inducting them into the Lexington Legends Hall of Fame. These individuals are:

- Josh Anderson, outfielder (2004), inducted in 2005
- John Buck, catcher (2001), inducted in 2005
- Joe Cannon, manager (2001–2002), inducted in 2006
- Félix Escalona, second baseman (2001), inducted in 2005
- Mike Gallo, pitcher (2002), inducted in 2007
- Kirk Saarloos, pitcher (2001), inducted in 2006
- Dave Coggin, pitcher (2005), inducted in 2008
- Alan Stein, Team President/COO, inducted in 2005
- Charley Taylor, pitching coach, inducted in 2005
- Jon Topolski, outfielder (2001), inducted in 2005
- Tommy Whiteman, shortstop (2001–2002), inducted in 2007
