= Greensboro Grasshoppers =

- Founded in 1979; Greensboro, North Carolina
Team logo
Cap insignia

Minor league affiliations
- Class: High-A (2021–present)
- Previous classes: Class A (1979–2020)
- League: South Atlantic League (1980–present)
- Division: North Division
- Previous leagues: Western Carolinas League (1979)

Major league affiliations
- Team: Pittsburgh Pirates (2019–present)
- Previous teams: Miami Marlins (2003–2018); New York Yankees (1990–2002); Cincinnati Reds (1988–1989); Boston Red Sox (1985–1987); New York Yankees (1980–1984); Cincinnati Reds (1979)

Minor league titles
- League titles (4): 1980; 1981; 1982; 2011
- Division titles (9): 1980; 1981; 1982; 1985; 1993; 1997; 2011; 2012; 2026
- First-half titles (1): 2024
- Second-half titles (1): 2025
- Wild card berths (2): 2021; 2026

Team data
- Name: Greensboro Grasshoppers (2005–present)
- Previous names: Greensboro Bats (1994–2004); Greensboro Hornets (1979–1993)
- Colors: Green, black, orange, ecru, white
- Mascot: Guilford Grasshopper
- Ballpark: First National Bank Field (2005–present)
- Previous parks: World War Memorial Stadium (1979–2004)
- Owner/ Operator: Temerity Baseball
- General manager: Tim Vangel
- Manager: José Mosquera
- Website: milb.com/greensboro

The Greensboro Grasshoppers are a Minor League Baseball team based in Greensboro, North Carolina. They are members of the South Atlantic League and are the High-A affiliate of the Pittsburgh Pirates. They play their home games at First National Bank Field, which opened in 2005 and seats 7,499 fans.

Prior to 2005, the team nickname was the Hornets (1979–1993) and the Bats (1994–2004); all home games were held at World War Memorial Stadium, just northeast of downtown Greensboro. The team's nickname and logo were changed to Grasshoppers to coincide with the inaugural season at the new ballpark. Fans selected the name "Guilford" (an homage to the county in which Greensboro is located) for the team's mascot, a giant grasshopper.

== History ==
Greensboro has fielded professional teams since the early 1900s, in several different leagues. Early on, the nickname Greensboro Patriots was applied to those teams, in reference to the Battle of Guilford Court House.

There were a few false starts. In 1902 local cotton broker Leon J. Brandt fielded a Greensboro team in the North Carolina League, but the league failed in mid-season. The Virginia-North Carolina League of 1905 included the Greensboro Farmers franchise, also owned by Brandt. The league completed its season but disbanded thereafter.

The Greensboro Patriots joined the Carolina Association as charter members in 1908 and began a run of 10 straight seasons in pro ball. The league was reorganized as the North Carolina Association for 1913 and renamed itself the North Carolina State League in 1916. The league played one more season and then disbanded after 1917. By then, America's involvement in World War I was well under way, and many minor leagues folded after 1917.

With peacetime, interest in professional baseball and the minor leagues revived. The Greensboro Patriots were revived as well, joining the newly formed Piedmont League in 1920, winning its inaugural championship. The Patriots also won the league title in 1926. In 1930, the club began a five-year affiliation with the St. Louis Cardinals.

After the Cardinals contract expired, the franchise transferred to Asheville Tourists in 1935. Five years later, minor league ball returned to Greensboro for a couple of years, with another Piedmont League entry called the Greensboro Red Sox, which played during 1941–1942.

After the Piedmont League years, another Greensboro team operated in the Carolina League during 1945–1968. The club was known variously as the Patriots (1945–1951), the Greensboro Pirates (1952–1954), the Patriots again (1955–1957), the Greensboro Yankees (1958–67), and the Patriots once again (1968). Following the 1968 season, Greensboro dropped out of professional ball for the next ten years, during a time when minor league baseball had lost popularity. That situation would start to change for the better in the late 1970s, and Greensboro would benefit from it.

The minors returned to Greensboro in 1979, with a new entry in the Western Carolinas League. The WCL renamed itself as the South Atlantic League the next year, reviving the name once used by the Southern League. Abandoning the old nickname of "Patriots", which by then was best known for the New England Patriots of the NFL, the new club instead decided to adopt the nickname Greensboro Hornets. That nickname was better known for teams based in Charlotte, but the Charlotte Hornets baseball team had abandoned its nickname after the 1973 season, and the new Greensboro team adopted it. Some naming rights complications arose when the Charlotte Hornets of the NBA began play in 1988. The nicknames co-existed in the state until 1994, when the Hornets settled with the NBA and changed their name to the punning nickname Greensboro Bats. Consequently, the team mascot switched from a hornet to a flying bat wielding a baseball bat.

With the move from 80-year-old War Memorial Stadium to the new park in 2005, the club further expanded its corporate face-lift by changing nicknames again, to the alliterative Greensboro Grasshoppers.

In the 2008 season 18-year-old Giancarlo Stanton, former second round pick by the Florida Marlins, set the single season record for home runs by a Greensboro player with 39.

In 2009, Master Yogi Berra, a black Labrador who has been "a fixture" at Grasshoppers games since then, became the only dog ever thrown out of a professional baseball game for "leaving a mess in the outfield."

In 2011, the Grasshoppers won 13 of their last 15 regular season games to make the playoffs for the first time in 12 years. After winning the second half of the season in the Northern Division, the Grasshoppers went on to beat the Savannah Sand Gnats in five games to win the South Atlantic League championship, their first title in 29 years.

In 2012, the Grasshoppers won the SAL Northern Division first half championship by posting a record of 46–24. They went on to win the Northern Division title with a 2–0 sweep of the Hagerstown Suns in the first round of the playoffs, but lost the Championship Series 3–1 to the Asheville Tourists.

In September 2018, the Grasshoppers signed a 2-year affiliation agreement with the Pittsburgh Pirates.

For the 2018 season, the Grasshoppers went 60–76 under manager Todd Pratt for a 13th-place finish in the South Atlantic League. For 2019, the Pirates organization made Miguel Perez head coach, who managed the Grasshoppers to an improved 79–59 for a 3rd-place finish. For 2020 Perez was moved to the Pirates' Bradenton Marauders club, and the Pirates announced Kieran Mattison would be the Grasshoppers' new manager. However, all minor league baseball was shut down due to the COVID-19 pandemic.

In conjunction with Major League Baseball's restructuring of Minor League Baseball in 2021, the Grasshoppers were organized into the High-A East. They finished the 2021 season in second place in the Southern Division with a record of 74–46. Despite not winning the division, their record was the second-best overall in the league, which qualified them for the playoffs. They lost the best-of-five championship series to the Bowling Green Hot Rods, 3–2.

On January 4, 2022, Temerity Baseball bought the team. Temerity Baseball also owns the Kannapolis Cannon Ballers. Team owner Andy Sandler intends to develop mixed-use and multi-family development around the stadium. Prior to the season, the High-A East once again became known as the South Atlantic League, the name historically used by the regional circuit prior to the 2021 reorganization. The Grasshoppers (58–70) finished fifth in overall SAL North standings that year.

After a 68–61 campaign in 2023, the team followed with a 75–55 overall record in 2024, winning the SAL North first-half pennant in 2024; however, the Grasshoppers lost their best-of-3 series to the Hudson Valley Renegades, 2–1, in the first round of the playoffs.

== Ballpark ==
The Greensboro clubs initially played their home games at Cone Athletic Park, better known as simply Cone Park. World War Memorial Stadium opened in 1926 (on Armistice Day), but the Patriots continued to play at Cone Park until 1930, when the addition of lights and other improvements to the Stadium, spurred by the affiliation with the Cardinals, resulted in the team moving to the Stadium. The various Greensboro clubs would call the Stadium "home" for the next 75 years. The franchise moved from 80-year-old War Memorial Stadium to First National Bank Field in 2005.

== Notable franchise alumni ==
Hall of Fame alumni

- Heinie Manush (1941–1942, MGR) Inducted, 1964
- Johnny Mize (1930–1931, 1933) Inducted, 1981
- Mariano Rivera (1991, 1993) 13 x MLB All-Star; 1999 World Series Most Valuable Player; All-Time MLB Saves Leader, Inducted 2019
- Derek Jeter (1992–1993) 14 x AL All-Star; 1995 AL Rookie of the Year; 2000 World Series Most Valuable Player

Notable alumni

- Johnny Allen (1945) MLB All-Star
- Luis Arroyo (1948) 2 x MLB All-Star
- Curt Blefary (1962–1963) 1965 AL Rookie of the Year
- Jim Bouton (1960) Author; MLB All-Star
- Mace Brown (1930) MLB All-Star
- Robinson Cano (2002) 8 x MLB All-Star
- Chris Coghlan (2007) 2009 NL Rookie of the Year
- Scott Cooper (1987) 2 x MLB All-Star
- Carl Everett (1991) 2 x MLB All-Star
- Jose Fernández 2 x MLB All-Star; 2013 NL Rookie of the Year
- Wes Ferrell (1949) 2 x MLB All-Star
- Dave Ferriss (1942) 2 x MLB All-Star
- Ken Forsch (1968) 2 x MLB All-Star
- Greg Gagne (1980–1981)
- Sterling Hitchcock (1990)
- Rex Hudler (1980)
- Stan Javier (1983)
- Josh Johnson (2003, 2008) 2 x MLB All-Star; 2010 NL ERA Leader
- Nick Johnson (1997)
- Roberto Kelly (1983) 2 x MLB All-Star
- Mike Lowell (1996) 4 x MLB All-Star; 2007 World Series Most Valuable Player
- Bill Lee (1930) 2 x MLB All-Star; 1938 NL ERA Leader
- Ken McBride (1955–1956) 3 x MLB All-Star
- Don Mattingly (1980) 6 x MLB All-Star; 1984 AL Batting Title; 1985 AL Most Valuable Player
- John Mayberry (1968) 2 x MLB All-Star
- Bill Monbouquette (1957) 4 x MLB All-Star
- Otis Nixon (1980)
- Fritz Ostermueller (1931)
- Marcell Ozuna (2011) 2 x MLB All-Star
- Mike Pagliarulo (1982)
- Fritz Peterson (1965) MLB All-Star
- Andy Pettitte (1992) 3 x MLB All-Star
- Jorge Posada (1992) 5 x MLB All-Star
- Rip Radcliff (1948) MLB All-Star
- Reggie Sanders (1989) MLB All-Star
- Curt Schilling (1987) 6 x MLB All-Star; World Series Most Valuable Player
- Ernie Shore (1913)
- Shane Spencer (1992–1993)
- Russ Springer (1990)
- Giancarlo Stanton (2008) 4 x MLB All-Star; 2 x NL Home Run Leader (2014, 2017); 2017 NL Most Valuable Player
- Mel Stottlemyre (1962) 5 x MLB All-Star
- Eddie Taubensee (1987)
- Jim Turner (1926) MLB All-Star; 1937 NL ERA Leader
- Tom Tresh (1959) 3 x MLB All Star; 1962 AL Rookie of the Year
- Jason Vargas (2005) MLB All-Star
- Dixie Walker (1928) 5 x MLB All-Star; 1944 NL Batting Title
- Roy White (1962–1963) 2 x MLB All-Star
- Christian Yelich (2011) 2018 MLB All-Star; 2018 NL Batting Title; 2018 NL Most Valuable Player

=== Active ===
Greensboro alumni who are currently on Major League active rosters as of August 25, 2025:

- Mark Canha, outfielder, Kansas City Royals
- Marcell Ozuna, outfielder, Atlanta Braves
- J. T. Realmuto, catcher, Philadelphia Phillies
- Christian Yelich, outfielder, Milwaukee Brewers
- Luis Castillo, pitcher, Seattle Mariners
- Andrew Heaney, pitcher, Pittsburgh Pirates
- Josh Naylor, infielder, Seattle Mariners
- Edward Cabrera, pitcher, Chicago Cubs
- Osvaldo Bido, pitcher, Athletics
- Henry Davis, catcher, Pittsburgh Pirates
- Yerry De Los Santos, pitcher, New York Yankees
- Nick Gonzales, infielder, Pittsburgh Pirates
- Carmen Mlodzinski, pitcher, Pittsburgh Pirates
- Jared Triolo, infielder, Pittsburgh Pirates
- Tyler Kinley, pitcher, Colorado Rockies
- Quinn Priester, pitcher, Milwaukee Brewers
- Chris Paddack, pitcher, Detroit Tigers
- Braxton Ashcraft, pitcher, Pittsburgh Pirates
- Mike Burrows, pitcher, Pittsburgh Pirates
- Giancarlo Stanton, designated hitter, New York Yankees
- Bubba Chandler, pitcher, Pittsburgh Pirates
- Liover Peguero, infielder, Pittsburgh Pirates

== Roster ==
Greensboro Grasshoppers roster
Players	Coaches/Other
Pitchers: 39 Jack Anker; 31 Cesar Aquino; 35 Jacob Bimbi; 48 Victor Cabreja; 18 Brandon Cain; 28 Hung-Leng Chang; 41 Ronaldo Gallo; 44 Jose Garces ~; 16 Kyle Larsen; 16 Inmer Lobo; 53 Garrett McMillan #; 14 Bryan Mena; 25 Greiber Mendez; 49 Reinold Navarro; 23 Adolfo Oviedo; 27 Treyson Peters; 26 Yulian Quintana; 29 Carlson Reed; 22 Braydon Risley; 45 Levi Sterling; 46 Isaias Uribe; 51 Draven Zeigler; Catchers: 38 Axiel Plaz; 36 Richard Ramirez; 17 Jonathan Rivero; Infielders: 2 Carlos Caro; 8 Yordany De Los Santos; 34 Brent Iredale; 37 Jared Jones; 5 Dylan Palmer; 24 Wyatt Sanford; 34 Jhonny Severino; Outfielders: 47 Tony Blanco Jr.; 15 Edward Florentino; 37 Jhostynxon Garcia *#; 32 Eddie King Jr.; 7 Josh Tate	Manager: -- José Mosquera; Coaches: 50 Quentin Brown (hitting); 52 Rafael Chaves (pitching); 9 Pedro Florimón (development); 43 Jonathan Roof (hitting); 30 Phillip Wellman (bench); 60-day injured list: 45 Carlos Castillo; 46 Junior Flores (full season); 12 Seth Hernandez; 32 Owen Kellington; -- Cameron Keshock; 41 Alexis Torres (full season); 7-day injured list; * On Pittsburgh Pirates 40-man roster; ~ Development list; # Rehab assignment; ∞ Reserve list; ‡ Restricted list; § Suspended list; † Temporarily inactive list; Roster updated September 6, 2026; Transactions; → More rosters: MiLB • South Atlantic League; → Pittsburgh Pirates minor league players

== Sources ==
- Professional Baseball Franchises, Peter Filichia, Facts on File Books, 1993.
- Baseball in North Carolina's Piedmont, Chris Holaday, Arcadia, 2002.
