= Arctos Partners =

American sports and venue management company

- Industry: Sports management
- Founded: 2019; 7 years ago
- Founder: Ian Charles; David "Doc" O'Connor
- Parent: KKR & Co.
- Website: www.arctospartners.com

Arctos Partners is an American private equity firm founded in 2019 by Ian Charles and David "Doc" O'Connor, and primarily invests minority stakes in sports franchises.

In 2020, Theo Epstein, the former general manager for the Boston Red Sox and Chicago Cubs, joined the company and served as a strategic advisor for the company's ventures into baseball and partnership with Fenway Sports Group. In January 2026, KKR & Co. acquired the company in a deal which valued Arctos at $1 billion.

== Brands and properties ==
Arctos owns majority stakes in a number of professional sports teams, including the following:

Team	League	Year Acquired	Ownership Percentage	Investment Amount	Notes
Akron RubberDucks	Minor League Baseball (Eastern League (Double-A))	2025			Through Prospector Baseball Group(PBG)
Atalanta BC	Serie A	2022		$36M	
Boston Red Sox	Major League Baseball (MLB)				Through investment in Fenway Sports Group
Buffalo Bills	National Football League (NFL)	2024	10%	$560M	
Chicago Cubs	Major League Baseball (MLB)				
Golden State Warriors	National Basketball Association (NBA)	2021	8% originally, but increased to about 13%	$715M	
Houston Astros	Major League Baseball (MLB)				
Jacksonville Jumbo Shrimp	Minor League Baseball (International League (Triple-A))				Through Prospector Baseball Group (PBG)
Joe Gibbs Racing	NASCAR				Minority stake along with Harris Blitzer Sports & Entertainment
Lancaster Stormers	Minor League Baseball (Atlantic League of Professional Baseball (Independent league))				Through Prospector Baseball Group (PBG)
Liverpool F.C.	Premier League				Through investment in Fenway Sports Group
Los Angeles Chargers	National Football League (NFL)	2025	8%		
Los Angeles Dodgers	Major League Baseball (MLB)				
Minnesota Wild	National Hockey League (NHL)				
New Jersey Devils	National Hockey League (NHL)				Through investment in Harris Blitzer Sports & Entertainment
Paris Saint-Germain FC	Ligue 1	2023	12.5%	€530M	
Philadelphia 76ers	National Basketball Association (NBA)				Through investment in Harris Blitzer Sports & Entertainment
Pittsburgh Penguins	National Hockey League (NHL)				
Sacramento Kings	National Basketball Association (NBA)	2021	17%	$306M	Purchased some shares from Shaquille O'Neal in 2022 after he had a conflict of interest
San Diego Padres	Major League Baseball (MLB)				
San Francisco Giants	Major League Baseball (MLB)				
Tampa Bay Lightning	National Hockey League (NHL)	2023			Sold in 2024
Utah Jazz	National Basketball Association (NBA)				Through Smith Entertainment Group (SEG)
Utah Mammoth	National Hockey League (NHL)				
Washington Capitals	National Hockey League (NHL)	2025			Through Monumental Sports & Entertainment
Washington Mystics	Women's National Basketball Association (WNBA)	2025			Through Monumental Sports & Entertainment
Washington Wizards	National Basketball Association (NBA)	2025			Through Monumental Sports & Entertainment

Arctos also has investments outside of sports franchises, including investments in SeatGeek; DraftKings; and 359 Capital. In addition, Arctos has shares in the Professional Lacrosse League and college sports firm, Elevate.
