= Savannah Sand Gnats =

- 1984–2015; Savannah, Georgia
Team logo
Cap insignia

Minor league affiliations
- Class: Class A (1984–2015)
- League: South Atlantic League (1984–2015)

Major league affiliations
- Team: New York Mets (2007–2015); Washington Nationals (2005–2006); Montreal Expos (2003–2004); Texas Rangers (1998–2002); Los Angeles Dodgers (1996–1997); St. Louis Cardinals (1984–1995)

Minor league titles
- League titles (4): 1993; 1994; 1996; 2013
- Division titles (2): 1993; 2013

Team data
- Name: Savannah Sand Gnats (1996–2015); Savannah Cardinals (1984–1995)
- Colors: Dark green, burgundy, tan, black, white
- Mascot: Gnate the Gnat (2005-2015); Gnic the Gnat (1996-2004)
- Ballpark: Grayson Stadium (1984–2015)
- Owner/ Operator: Hardball Capital

The Savannah Sand Gnats were a minor league baseball team based in Savannah, Georgia. They were a member of the A-level South Atlantic League. The Sand Gnats were an affiliate of the New York Mets in their final nine seasons. The team relocated to Columbia, South Carolina, in 2016 where they are now known as the Columbia Fireflies.

== History ==
The Sand Gnats began as the Savannah Cardinals when the Macon Redbirds moved to Savannah after the 1983 season. The team played their inaugural season in 1984, affiliated with the St. Louis Cardinals. In 1996, the team changed its name to the Sand Gnats and became an affiliate of the Los Angeles Dodgers. The team was affiliated with the Texas Rangers from 1998 to 2002 and the Montreal Expos/Washington Nationals from 2003 to 2006.

The Sand Gnats played their home games at Grayson Stadium. Opened in 1927, Grayson Stadium seated 4,700 fans during its time as the home of the Sand Gnats. The Sand Gnats won four SAL championships (1993, 1994, 1996, 2013).

On January 11, 2007, the Sand Gnats named Tim Teufel as manager for the 2007 season.

On May 8, 2007, Jorge Reyes, a pitcher for the Sand Gnats, was suspended for violating Minor League Baseball's substance abuse policy. Reyes was the first player to receive a 100-game suspension for his second violation.

On March 20, 2008, Atlanta-based Hardball Capital purchased the Savannah Sand Gnats.

Among their notable alumni are Adrián Beltré, Jacob DeGrom, Ian Desmond, Éric Gagné, Edwin Encarnación, Michael Fulmer, Travis Hafner, Hank Blalock, Steven Matz, Collin McHugh, Brandon Nimmo, Josh Whitesell, Josh Satin, and Ryan Zimmerman.

== Season-by-season records ==
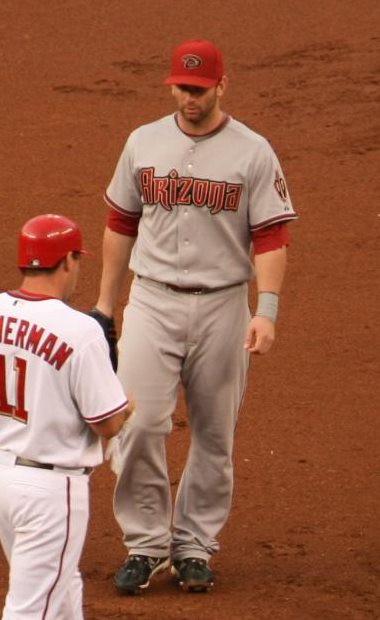
Former Sand Gnats, Josh Whitesell and Ryan Zimmerman (left)

Note: W = Wins, L = Losses

Season	W	L	Finish	Postseason
1984	78	61	3rd, Southern	Lost in semi-finals
1985	57	78	4th, Southern	Did not qualify
1986	75	60	2nd, Southern	Did not qualify
1987	69	69	4th, Southern	Did not qualify
1988	68	67	5th, Southern	Did not qualify
1989	69	70	4th, Southern	Did not qualify
1990	73	68	6th, Southern	Lost League Finals
1991	61	77	7th, Southern	Did not qualify
1992	62	78	5th, Southern	Did not qualify
1993	94	48	1st, Southern	League Champions
1994	82	55	2nd, Southern	League Champions
1995	56	83	6th, Southern	Did not qualify
1996	72	69	2nd, Southern	League Champions
1997	63	77	3rd, Southern	Did not qualify
1998	66	76	3rd, Southern	Did not qualify
1999	62	78	4th, Southern	Did not qualify
2000	74	65	4th, Southern	Did not qualify
2001	54	82	8th, Southern	Did not qualify
2002	49	89	8th, Southern	Did not qualify
2003	58	80	7th, Southern	Did not qualify
2004	58	80	7th, Southern	Did not qualify
2005	62	76	7th, Southern	Did not qualify
2006	56	83	7th, Southern	Did not qualify
2007	41	94	8th, Southern	Did not qualify
2008	61	76	7th, Southern	Did not qualify
2009	65	72	Southern	Did not qualify
2010	75	64	Southern	Lost in semi-finals
2011	79	60	Southern	Lost League Finals
2012	69	67	Southern	Did not qualify
2013	77	61	Southern	League Champions
2014	85	51	Southern	Lost in semi-finals
2015	83	54	1st, Southern	Lost in League Finals

1984–1995: Savannah Cardinals

=== Rivals ===
==== Augusta GreenJackets ====
The Sand Gnats had a in-state rivalry with the Augusta GreenJackets, an affiliate of the San Francisco Giants.

==== Charleston RiverDogs ====
The Sand Gnats had a rivalry with the Charleston RiverDogs, an affiliate of the New York Yankees.
