= Diamond Baseball Holdings =

Sports ownership and management group

- Industry: Sports management
- Founded: 2021; 5 years ago
- Founder: Endeavor
- Key people: Pat Battle, executive chairman Peter B. Freund, CEO
- Parent: Silver Lake
- Website: diamondbaseballholdings.com

Diamond Baseball Holdings (DBH) is an American sports ownership and management group that operates 49 Minor League Baseball (MiLB) teams in the United States and Canada. DBH was established in 2021 by media conglomerate Endeavor and is a subsidiary of the investment firm Silver Lake.

== History ==
Established in 2021 by media conglomerate Endeavor, the organization originally was the owner and operator of nine MiLB clubs. In 2022, ownership of DBH shifted from Endeavor to Silver Lake, parent company of Endeavor, who purchased DBH for $280 million.

The company is led by Pat Battle, who formerly headed Collegiate Licensing Company (CLC), which licensed the rights to college athletic team apparel and merchandise, and IMG College, which acquired CLC. Battle and CEO Peter B. Freund convinced Major League Baseball (MLB) that increased professionalization and consolidated ownership of Minor League Baseball, with sharing of best practices and cross-investment, was best for MLB teams. The company plans to reach the current MLB limit of owning 50 teams. In addition to gate revenue, the company also plans to pursue mixed-use development on stadium parking lots; increase the number of non-game events such as concerts, weddings, and corporate events; and consolidate sponsorship, advertising, and back-office activities to a national marketplace.

Baseball America called DBH "the most powerful ownership group in the history of Minor League Baseball" in 2024. Battle and Freund reportedly have a close relationship with Commissioner of Baseball Rob Manfred. DBH has received more than $275 million in tax preferences for MiLB teams that they own, as of March 2024.

=== Rebrands and relocations ===
DBH has rebranded some teams, with the Rome Braves becoming the Rome Emperors and Salem Red Sox becoming the Salem RidgeYaks. DBH has also relocated several of its minor league franchises:

- DBH bought the Down East Wood Ducks and another team from the Texas Rangers in 2023, moving the franchise from Kinston, North Carolina to Spartanburg, South Carolina to be the Hub City Spartanburgers, which play in a newly built stadium. Public funding for the stadium and surrounding developments was $118 million.
- DBH purchased the Mississippi Braves from the Atlanta Braves before the 2022 season and moved the team from Pearl, Mississippi to Columbus, Georgia, renaming the team the Columbus Clingstones. The city of Columbus borrowed $50 million to renovate the Clingstones ballpark.
- The Modesto Nuts, which Diamond bought from the Seattle Mariners in December 2024, left Modesto after the 2025 season. Diamond changed the MLB affiliations of several California teams, with a new team moving to Ontario to become the Ontario Tower Buzzers in 2026, which will also have a new ballpark. The stadium and surrounding sports facilities had a projected cost of $151 million in April 2025.

== Teams ==
Diamond Baseball Holdings owns 49 teams, as of April 2026.

Teams owned by Diamond Baseball Holdings
Team	Location	League	Class	Affiliate	Acquired
Albuquerque Isotopes	Albuquerque, New Mexico	Pacific Coast League	Triple-A	Colorado Rockies	2023
Altoona Curve	Altoona, Pennsylvania	Eastern League	Double-A	Pittsburgh Pirates	2023
Arkansas Travelers	North Little Rock, Arkansas	Texas League	Double-A	Seattle Mariners	2024
Augusta GreenJackets	North Augusta, South Carolina	Carolina League	Single-A	Atlanta Braves	2021
Binghamton Rumble Ponies	Binghamton, New York	Eastern League	Double-A	New York Mets	2024
Birmingham Barons	Birmingham, Alabama	Southern League	Double-A	Chicago White Sox	2023
Brooklyn Cyclones	Brooklyn, New York	South Atlantic League	High-A	New York Mets	2024
Charlotte Knights	Charlotte, North Carolina	International League	Triple-A	Chicago White Sox	2024
Columbus Clingstones	Columbus, Georgia	Southern League	Double-A	Atlanta Braves	2021
Corpus Christi Hooks	Corpus Christi, Texas	Texas League	Double-A	Houston Astros	2025
Dayton Dragons	Dayton, Ohio	Midwest League	High-A	Cincinnati Reds	2025
Fayetteville Woodpeckers	Fayetteville, North Carolina	Carolina League	Single-A	Houston Astros	2025
Fredericksburg Nationals	Fredericksburg, Virginia	Carolina League	Single-A	Washington Nationals	2025
Fresno Grizzlies	Fresno, California	California League	Single-A	Colorado Rockies	2023
Gwinnett Stripers	Lawrenceville, Georgia	International League	Triple-A	Atlanta Braves	2021
Harrisburg Senators	Harrisburg, Pennsylvania	Eastern League	Double-A	Washington Nationals	2024
Hickory Crawdads	Hickory, North Carolina	Carolina League	Single-A	Texas Rangers	2023
Hudson Valley Renegades	Fishkill, New York	South Atlantic League	High-A	New York Yankees	2021
Hub City Spartanburgers	Spartanburg, South Carolina	South Atlantic League	High-A	Texas Rangers	2023
Inland Empire 66ers	San Bernardino, California	California League	Single-A	Seattle Mariners	2024
Iowa Cubs	Des Moines, Iowa	International League	Triple-A	Chicago Cubs	2021
Lansing Lugnuts	Lansing, Michigan	Midwest League	High-A	Athletics	2023
Louisville Bats	Louisville, Kentucky	International League	Triple-A	Cincinnati Reds	2023
Memphis Redbirds	Memphis, Tennessee	International League	Triple-A	St. Louis Cardinals	2021
Midland RockHounds	Midland, Texas	Texas League	Double-A	Athletics	2022
New Hampshire Fisher Cats	Manchester, New Hampshire	Eastern League	Double-A	Toronto Blue Jays	2023
Norfolk Tides	Norfolk, Virginia	International League	Triple-A	Baltimore Orioles	2023
Oklahoma City Comets	Oklahoma City, Oklahoma	Pacific Coast League	Triple-A	Los Angeles Dodgers	2021
Omaha Storm Chasers	Papillion, Nebraska	International League	Triple-A	Kansas City Royals	2024
Ontario Tower Buzzers	Ontario, California	California League	Single-A	Los Angeles Dodgers	2025
Ozarks Springbirds	Springfield, Missouri	Texas League	Double-A	St. Louis Cardinals	2023
Portland Sea Dogs	Portland, Maine	Eastern League	Double-A	Boston Red Sox	2022
Rancho Cucamonga Quakes	Rancho Cucamonga, California	California League	Single-A	Los Angeles Angels	2024
Reading Fightin Phils	Reading, Pennsylvania	Eastern League	Double-A	Philadelphia Phillies	2025
Rome Emperors	Rome, Georgia	South Atlantic League	High-A	Atlanta Braves	2021
Salem RidgeYaks	Salem, Virginia	Carolina League	Single-A	Boston Red Sox	2023
San Jose Giants	San Jose, California	California League	Single-A	San Francisco Giants	2021
Scranton/Wilkes-Barre Highlanders	Moosic, Pennsylvania	International League	Triple-A	New York Yankees	2021
St. Paul Saints	Saint Paul, Minnesota	International League	Triple-A	Minnesota Twins	2023
Sugar Land Space Cowboys	Sugar Land, Texas	Pacific Coast League	Triple-A	Houston Astros	2025
Syracuse Mets	Syracuse, New York	International League	Triple-A	New York Mets	2024
Trenton Thunder	Trenton, New Jersey	MLB Draft League	Collegiate Summer	Unaffiliated	2026
Tri-City Dust Devils	Pasco, Washington	Northwest League	High-A	Los Angeles Angels	2024
Tulsa Drillers	Tulsa, Oklahoma	Texas League	Double-A	Los Angeles Dodgers	2023
Vancouver Canadians	Vancouver, British Columbia	Northwest League	High-A	Toronto Blue Jays	2023
Wichita Turbo Tubs	Wichita, Kansas	Texas League	Double-A	Minnesota Twins	2022
Winston-Salem Dash	Winston-Salem, North Carolina	South Atlantic League	High-A	Chicago White Sox	2024
Wisconsin Timber Rattlers	Grand Chute, Wisconsin	Midwest League	High-A	Milwaukee Brewers	2025
Worcester Red Sox	Worcester, Massachusetts	International League	Triple-A	Boston Red Sox	2023

Former teams:

Team	Location	League	Years	Notes
Down East Wood Ducks	Kinston, North Carolina	Carolina League	2023–2024	Moved to Spartansburg, South Carolina to be the Hub City Spartanburgers
Mississippi Braves	Pearl, Mississippi	Southern League	2021–2024	Moved to Columbus, Georgia, and became the Columbus Clingstones
Modesto Nuts	Modesto, California	California League	2024–2025	Became the Ontario Tower Buzzers

== See also ==
- List of Pacific Coast League principal owners
- List of International League principal owners
- List of Double-A baseball team owners
