= Quint Studer =

American businessman and philanthropist

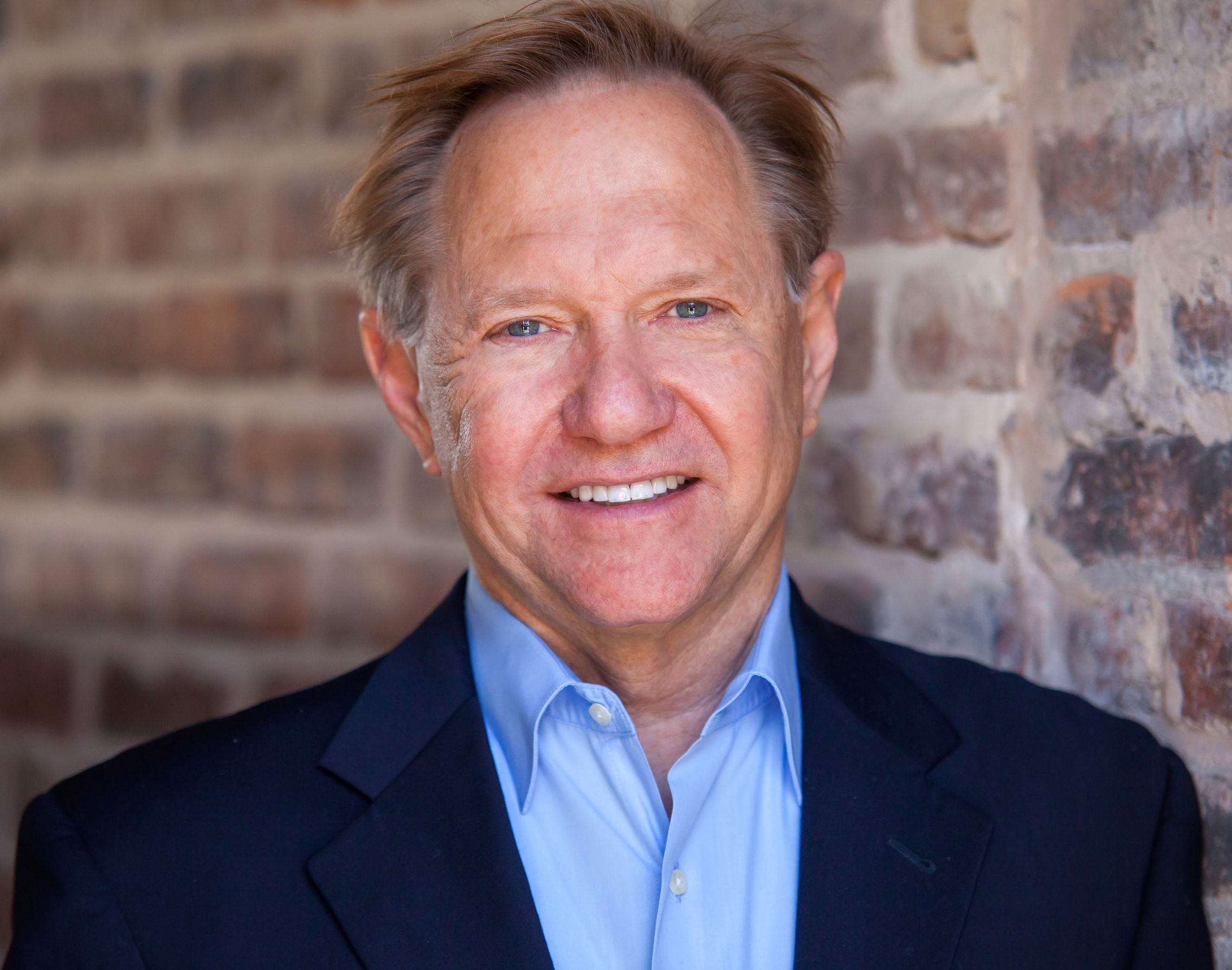
- Born: 1951 (age 74–75); LaGrange, Illinois, USA
- Occupations: Entrepreneur, public speaker
- Known for: Founder of The Studer Group, owner of the Pensacola Blue Wahoos, owner of the Beloit Sky Carp

Quinton D. Studer (born 1951) is a Pensacola, Florida businessman and philanthropist, known as the co-owner of the minor league baseball team the Pensacola Blue Wahoos and founder of the healthcare consulting company, Studer Group.

== Early life and family ==
Studer was born in 1951 in La Grange, Illinois, to working-class parents. He had partial deafness and a speech impediment. He attended University of Wisconsin-Whitewater and eventually earned master's degree in special education. He worked as a special education teacher for 10 years. After attending counseling for alcoholism, his work with teens with drug and alcohol problems led to his entry into the healthcare field.

Studer's wife, Mary P., known as "Rishy", is also a local business owner/manager and runs the Studer Foundation, Inc. Quint has 5 children and 6 grandchildren.

== Career ==
=== Early career ===
Following his graduation from college in 1973, Studer spent ten years as a special education teacher at George S. Parker High School in Janesville, Wisconsin, and Harvard High School in Harvard, Illinois. After attending counseling for alcoholism, Studer began to work with teens with drug and alcohol problems, which led to his entry into the healthcare field in 1984. In 1987, he became director of marketing for Mercy Hospital in Janesville, Wisconsin. He later served for three years as senior vice president of business development for the hospital.

In 1993, Studer became the COO of Holy Cross Hospital in Chicago, Illinois, which was facing severe financial challenges. Holy Cross CEO Mark Clement assigned Studer the task of improving patient satisfaction. Studer used management techniques focused on raising patient satisfaction through improvements to conditions for employees. The hospital's patient satisfaction rose from 3 to 73 percent in six months and improved financial results. Hospitals & Health Networks & American Hospital Association named Holy Cross "Great Comeback of the Year".

Hospital executives from around the country began coming to Holy Cross to assess their performance and hear Studer speak about the progress made at the hospital. One of the organizations that came to Holy Cross to hear Studer speak was a team from Baptist Hospital in Pensacola, Florida. In 1996, Baptist hired Studer as its administrator and within a year he was named president of the hospital, where he worked to turn around the hospital's finances and improve patient and employee satisfaction. During his time at Baptist, employee turnover rate dropped by 18 percent and patient satisfaction at the hospital rose to the 99th percentile among all hospitals in the US. The results at Baptist led to several awards for the hospital and Inc. Magazine named Studer a "Master of Business". Studer also began taking on more speaking engagements.

=== Studer Group ===
Studer formed Studer Group, L.L.C., a private health care consulting group in Gulf Breeze, Florida, in 1999. In 2000, he left Baptist Hospital to focus on his new company.

One of Studer Group's early clients was Tenet Healthcare. Studer developed Tenet's "Target 100" program, which sought 100 percent patient satisfaction. The endeavor was announced a success within two years and Studer told Fast Company the work brought Tenet's quarterly Wall Street earnings to an all-time high. However, Melissa Davis of TheStreet.com reported that aggressive Medicare billing that was possibly illegal and unethical fueled much of the growth. She also noted that some Tenet nurses were unhappy with Studer's training.

By 2014, the Studer Group had approximately 750 clients. Studer also began speaking to groups outside of healthcare, including small businesses, school districts, and churches.

In 2011, Studer sold 70 percent of the company to JMI Equity. Chicago-based Huron Consulting Group acquired the Studer Group for $325 million in January 2015.

=== Books ===
As of 2014, Studer has authored six books starting with Hardwiring Excellence: Purpose, Worthwhile Work, Making a Difference.

=== Sports ===
Quint Studer is an owner of three minor league baseball teams: the AA Pensacola Blue Wahoos, the High-A Beloit Sky Carp, both of which are affiliated with the Miami Marlins and in April 2026 he purchased the Kansas City Monarchs, a member of the independent league American Association of Professional Baseball.

== Philanthropy ==
Studer and his wife donated $200,000 to the Lacey A. Collier Snoezelen Complex, a facility for sensory disabled children. They also donated to the Zoo Northwest Florida. In 2011, they paid for a contest called "Pensacola Business Challenge" that awarded a package valued at $50,000 to "local entrepreneurs wanting to start or expand a business in downtown Pensacola." The Studers donated $1 million to the University of Wisconsin at Whitewater in 2012. They are recognized as donors to scholarship programs at the University of West Florida and the Pensacola State College. The Studers donated $2.25 million to the Community Maritime Park that includes the Pensacola Bayfront Stadium, home of Pensacola Blue Wahoos.

The Studers founded nonprofit organizations to research and develop businesses that include the Studer Foundation founded in 2013 and the Studer Institute founded in 2014.
