= 7th Inning Stretch LLC =

Sports ownership and management company

- Industry: Sports management
- Founded: 1999; 27 years ago
- Headquarters: Stockton, California

7th Inning Stretch LLC is an American sports ownership and management company, which owns several Minor League Baseball teams.

== History ==
Tom Volpe founded 7th Inning Stretch LLC in 1999. Shortly after forming the company in 1999, Volpe and 7th Inning Stretch bought the Visalia Oaks (in 2009, the team changed the name to the Visalia Rawhide).

In 2002, 7th Inning Stretch acquired the Stockton Ports from Tom Seidler and the company moved its headquarters to Stockton, California. Seidler purchased the Oaks from Volpe and Volpe purchased the Ports from Seidler, in a win/win for both parties.

In November 2006, 7th Inning Stretch purchased the Delmarva Shorebirds of the South Atlantic League, the Class A affiliate of the Baltimore Orioles. In 2021, as a result of the restructuring of minor league baseball, the team moved to the Single-A Carolina League.

In November 2008, 7th Inning Stretch purchased the Everett AquaSox.

In 2016, 7th Inning Stretch acquired a minority stake in the Ebbets Field Flannels, a Seattle-based apparel company established in 1988.

== Sports properties ==
Team	League	Years owned	Notes
Delmarva Shorebirds	Carolina League (Single-A)	2006-present	
Everett AquaSox	Northwest League (High-A)	2008-present	
Stockton Ports	California League (Single-A)	2002-present	Swapped ownership with Vidalia Oaks
Visalia Oaks (now Visalia Rawhide)	California League (Class A-Advanced)	1999-2002	Swapped ownership with Stockton Ports
