= Hardball Capital =

Sports ownership and management company

- Industry: Sports management
- Founded: 2006; 20 years ago
- Founder: Jason Freier
- Headquarters: Atlanta
- Website: https://www.hardballcapital.com/

Hardball Capital is an American sports ownership and management company, which owns several Minor League Baseball teams.

== History ==
Jason Freier is the chairman and Chief executive officer of Hardball Capital, which is based in Atlanta.

On February 20, 2006, Hardball Capital purchased the Fort Wayne Wizards. Following the 2008 season, the Wizards were renamed to the Fort Wayne TinCaps, in reference to Johnny Appleseed who lived in Fort Wayne and was buried in the city.

In July 2006, Hardball Capital purchased the Salem Avalanche. The team was bought for $8 million from Kelvin Bowles who had owned the team for 20 years. In December 2007, Hardball sold the team to Fenway Sports Group.

On March 20, 2008, Hardball Capital purchased the Savannah Sand Gnats of the South Atlantic League. In August 2015, Hardball moved the Savannah Sand Gnats to Columbia, South Carolina and they became the Columbia Fireflies and moved to the Carolina League.

In March 2015, Hardball purchased the Chattanooga Lookouts of the Double-A (baseball) Southern League.

== Sports properties ==
Current Minor League Baseball Teams owned
Team	League	Year acquired	Notes
Chattanooga Lookouts	Southern League (Double-A)	2015	
Columbia Fireflies	Carolina League (Single-A)	2015	Rebranded from Savannah Sand Gnats
Fort Wayne TinCaps	Midwest League (High-A)	2006	

Former Minor League Baseball Teams owned
Team	League	Years owned	Notes
Salem Avalanche	Carolina League (Class A-Advanced)	2006-2007	Sold to Fenway Sports Group
Savannah Sand Gnats	South Atlantic League (Class A)	2008-2015	Became the Columbia Fireflies
