= Lancaster Stormers =

American minor-league professional baseball team

Logo
Cap insignia

Information
- League: Atlantic League of Professional Baseball (North Division)
- Location: Lancaster, Pennsylvania
- Ballpark: Penn Medicine Park
- Founded: 2003
- League championships: (4) 2006, 2014, 2022, 2023
- Division championships: (5) 2006, 2012, 2014, 2022, 2023
- Former name: Lancaster Barnstormers (2003–2023)
- Colors: Red, black, gold, white
- Mascot: Cylo
- Retired numbers: 42
- Ownership: Prospector Baseball Group
- General manager: Michael Reynolds
- Manager: Ross Peeples
- Media: LNP
- Website: lancasterstormers.com

The Lancaster Stormers (formerly known as the Lancaster Barnstormers) are an American professional baseball team based in Lancaster, Pennsylvania. They are members of the North Division of the Atlantic League of Professional Baseball, a "partner league" of Major League Baseball. Since 2005, the team has played its home games at Penn Medicine Park in the city's Northwest Corridor, following the stadium's completion.

== History ==
=== Historical teams in Lancaster ===
Baseball first came to Lancaster County in the 1860s, when soldiers returned home from the Civil War. They learned the rules while serving in the military and wanted to keep playing. The very first professional baseball teams in Lancaster were the Lancaster Lancasters and the Lancaster Ironsides. The Lancasters played in the Keystone Association, while the Ironsides played in the Eastern League; both started in 1884. The following season, the Lancasters joined the Eastern League, and the two teams became rivals. They competed for fan support, league affiliation, and gate revenue. At its peak, insults and refusals to play against each other were the norm. The teams finally agreed to play each other at the end of the 1884 season, in which the Ironsides defeated the Lancasters after seven very close games. Only the Lancasters played the next season.

In the 1894-1895 seasons, a team called the Lancaster Chicks played in the Keystone Association. An all-African-American team called the Lancaster Giants followed in 1887, and many Lancastrians supported the team despite the social pressure of the day. The Giants hosted many exhibition games against the Philadelphia Giants of the Keystone Club.

Between 1896 and 1899, the first team called the Lancaster Maroons played in the original Atlantic League. In 1905, the second inception of the Maroons played in the Tri-State League.

In 1906, the Maroons became the Lancaster Red Roses. The rival White Roses from the nearby city of York reacted with fury to the name change, since both teams took their names from the opposing factions in England's historic Wars of the Roses.

=== The Barnstormers ===
Tom Herr, pictured here as a St. Louis Cardinals player in 1983, was the Barnstormers' first manager. He led the team to its first championship in 2006.

In 2003, the Atlantic League of Professional Baseball formally announced the addition of an expansion team to Lancaster. In November 2004, the Barnstormers announced the signing of Tom Herr, a Major League Baseball veteran and Lancaster native, as the team's first manager. The Barnstormers planned to begin competition in 2005 at the newly built Penn Medicine Park.

On May 11, they lost their first game, 4–3, to the Atlantic City Surf, in front of 7,300 fans. They finished the 2005 season with a record of 64 wins and 76 losses. In finishing the first half of the 2006 season with a record of 38–25, the Barnstormers qualified for their first Atlantic League playoff berth. They also won the second half, posting a record of 37–26. After defeating division challenger, Atlantic City, in the first round of the playoffs, the Barnstormers swept the Bridgeport Bluefish to win their first Atlantic League championship, in only their second season. Pitcher Denny Harriger threw a complete game, breaking a franchise record for consecutive pitches. It was the city of Lancaster's first professional championship since 1955 when the former Red Roses won the Piedmont League title. The Barnstormers played in the 2012 Atlantic League Championship Series but were ultimately defeated by the Long Island Ducks in Game 5. In 2012, the Lancaster Barnstormers set an Atlantic League record with 88 wins.

Herr managed the team from 2005 to 2006 and from 2009 to 2010. In 2008, the Barnstormers were coached by Von Hayes, a former teammate of Herr from the 1989 and 1990 Philadelphia Phillies. Rick Wise, the winning pitcher for the Boston Red Sox in Game 6 of the 1975 World Series, is also a managerial alumnus of the Lancaster Barnstormers. He was the team's third base coach from the inaugural 2005 season to the end of the 2008 campaign. Herr, in his second term, was succeeded by Butch Hobson.

Opening Day Partners (ODP), a company that specializes in baseball club and stadium operations, originally owned the Lancaster Stormers. ODP also created Atlantic League clubs in York, Pennsylvania, Southern Maryland, and Sugar Land, Texas. On November 12, 2014, ODP transitioned its ownership of the Stormers to Lancaster Baseball, LLC. Lancaster Baseball consists of Ian Ruzow, Rob Liss, Steve Zuckerman, and Bob Zuckerman. Ian Ruzow was born in South Africa and moved to the USA in 1980. The other three partners are all natives of New York, and all four have lived in Lancaster for 40 years. Steve Zuckerman, Ian Ruzow, and Bob Zuckerman were the founders of Clipper Magazine, with Rob Liss joining them a few years later. Clipper Magazine owned the naming rights to the stadium from 2005 to 2025.

On October 30, 2025, the team was sold to Prospector Baseball Group (PBG), becoming PBG's first team under its ownership.

== Branding ==
The team's original name (the Barnstormers), selected in a fan ballot, refers to the tradition of "barnstorming," which means to travel around an area appearing in exhibition sports events, especially baseball games. Writers used the term to describe Lancaster's baseball teams as early as 1906, when the Lancaster Daily Intelligencer reported, "There was a crowd of between seven and eight hundred persons out on Friday to see the Lancaster barnstormers play the Philadelphia Giants." Their original primary logo incorporated the colors red, navy blue, and khaki previously used by the Lancaster Red Roses of affiliated Minor League Baseball from 1940 to 1961. The name and logo also alluded to Lancaster's Pennsylvania Dutch agricultural heritage. The team changed its name to the Stormers as part of a rebranding effort between the 2023 and 2024 seasons.

After winning their second straight Atlantic League title in 2023, the Barnstormers' social media began to tease "A New Storm," set to be announced on February 15, 2024. On that day, the team unveiled a new logo set and a new name. Now known as the Lancaster Stormers, the new logo set features a bull's head with a lightning bolt down the middle of its face, displayed in red and khaki colors as the primary logo. Alternate logos include a bull charging through a barn, a circular logo with the team name on the outside, and a barn in a storm inside the circle, while retaining the white L with a baseball as a homage to the prior name and logo set.

== Logos and uniforms ==
The primary colors of the Stormers are red, black, gold, and white. These colors are similar to those previously used by the Red Roses to reflect Lancaster's baseball heritage. The primary logo features the "Stormers" wordmark in red with a white outline set against a black background. The letters are in a custom font inspired by fraktur, a Pennsylvania Dutch blackletter calligraphy. A bull's head completes the logo below the wordmark in red, black, and gold. There is also a lightning bolt across the bull's forehead. The secondary logo features a bull charging through a barn, while the tertiary logo is a black roundel with a red outline and "Lancaster Stormers" in gold letters. Inside the roundel, a baseball field is depicted, featuring a red barn as a backstop, with two white Xs implied on the door trim, symbolizing the Stormers' twentieth season. A rooster-themed weathervane tops the barn with lightning striking it.

The 'Stormers' home cap is red, featuring a stylized cursive L in white with a black and gold outline, interweaving with a curving baseball. The home jerseys are white with red headspoon piping and the cursive "Stormers" wordmark across the front in red, black, and gold. The away jersey is gray with red headspoon piping, featuring the cursive "Lancaster" wordmark in white and outlined in gold and black. The Stormers wear red belts, socks, and undershirts with all uniforms.

== Season-by-season records ==
Lancaster Stormers – 2005 to 2022
Season	W–L	Percentage	Finish	Playoffs
2005	63–77	.450	6th, South Division	Did not qualify
2006	75–51	.595	2nd, South Division	Won championship over Bridgeport 3–0
2007	57–69	.452	3rd, South Division	Did not qualify
2008	64–76	.457	3rd, Freedom Division	Did not qualify
2009	67–73	.479	3rd, Freedom Division	Did not qualify
2010	63–76	.453	3rd, Freedom Division	Did not qualify
2011	69–56	.552	2nd, Freedom Division	2–3
2012	88–52	.629	1st, Freedom Division	5–3 (won division final), 4–6 (lost championship)
2013	72–67	.518	3rd, Freedom Division	Did not qualify
2014	70–53	.569	2nd, Freedom Division	Won championship over Sugar Land 3–0
2015	75–65	.536	1st, Freedom Division	1–3
2016	67–73	.479	3rd, Freedom Division	Did not qualify
2017	76–64	.543	1st, Freedom Division	Did not qualify; York Revolution won the second half; Southern Maryland won the first half
2018	74–52	.587	2nd, Freedom Division	2–3
2019	51–89	.364	4th, Freedom Division	Did not qualify
2020	Season canceled due to the COVID-19 pandemic			
2021	56–63	.471	3rd in North Division (first half); 4th in North Division (second half)	Did not qualify; Southern Maryland won the second half; Long Island won the first half
2022	73–58	.557	1st, North Division	Won championship over High Point 3–0
2023	62–62	.500	1st, North Division (second half)	Won championship over Gastonia 3–2
Totals (2005–2023)	1222–1176	.510		35–23
War of the Roses	163–173	.485		

- 4 Atlantic League Championships (2006, 2014, 2022, 2023)

== Culture ==
=== War of the Roses ===
The cities of Lancaster and York in South Central Pennsylvania, US have a historical rivalry in all sporting events from the high-school level to the professional. Since the cities are named after the English cities of Lancaster and York, their former Pennsylvania baseball teams were named for the opposing sides of the Wars of the Roses. As a metaphor, "War of the Roses" describes the intense baseball matches fought between the Lancaster Red Roses and the York White Roses. With the addition of York to the Atlantic League, the Revolution and Stormers now continue this tradition as they battle each other for lower Susquehanna supremacy.

The "War of the Roses" was rekindled with the sound of celebratory cannon fire at the start of the 2007 Atlantic League season in Wrightsville, a borough located on the Susquehanna River, the natural boundary between Lancaster and York counties. The winner of the War of the Roses is presented with the Community Cup, while the defeated team is obligated to sing the ballpark classic "Take Me Out to the Ball Game" and plant a rose garden at the opponent's ballpark with their representative color: red for Lancaster, white for York. The first Community Cup was championed by the Stormers in the 2007 season, though the Revolution avenged them by winning it in 2008. The clubs also competed in the Route 30 Showdown in 2009–2011, an annual cross-county doubleheader inadvertently created after the 2008 season by a rain-delay.

Community Cup Record
Year	Series Winner	Stormers W	Revolution W	Notes
2007	Stormers	10	8	first Community Cup
2008	Revolution	9	11	
2009	Stormers	14	6	
2010	Revolution	4	16	2nd-earliest cup win; July 24
2011	Stormers	10	8	
2012	Stormers	10	10	Lancaster retains cup in a tie
2013	Revolution	8	12	
2014	Revolution	7	13	first consecutive cup win
2015	Stormers	15	11	
2016	Stormers	11	9	
2017	Revolution	9	10	
2018	Stormers	10	8	
2019	Revolution	8	11	
2020	Season canceled due to the COVID-19 pandemic			
2021	Revolution	12	13	
2022	Stormers	18	14	
2023	Revolution	8	13	
2024	Revolution	4	18	Earliest cup win; July 2
2025	Revolution	7	14	
Overall	Revolution (10–8)	173	201	

== Radio and television ==
Every Stormers game was broadcast on WLAN (1390 AM) and WPDC (1600 AM) by Dave Collins, their announcer. Select home games were televised on Blue Ridge Cable-11. On April 20, 2023, the Atlantic League announced that all games, including the Barnstormers, would be streamed exclusively on FloSports.

== Mascot ==
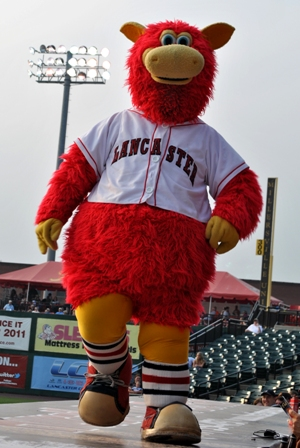
Cylo, the Stormers' mascot

The Lancaster Stormers' mascot is an anthropomorphic, red cow named Cylo. He wears the team's home jersey with striped socks and retro-style sneakers. Cylo debuted on March 4, 2005, at the Mascot Roller Mill in the Lancaster County village of Mascot. His name in full is Cyloicious L. Barnstormer, alluding to Hall of Fame pitcher Cy Young and to silos, representing the county's agricultural heritage. The mascot was designed by the Raymond Entertainment Group, which also produces the Phillie Phanatic's costume.

== Roster ==
Lancaster Stormers roster
Active (25-man) roster		Coaching staff
Pitchers: 31 Luke Albright; 9 A. J. Alexy; 3 Jason Bollman; 41 Noah Bremer; 4 Phillip Diehl; 19 Alex Garbrick; 18 Quinton Martinez; 33 Luke McCollough; 12 Zach Mizrahi; 44 Cole Patten; 16 Andrew Schulz; 32 Matt Stil; 28 Billy Sullivan; 27 Ronnie Voacolo	Catchers: 24 Josh Bancroft; 6 Evan Ulrich; 24 Kevin Watson Jr.; Infielders: -- Jeremy Arocho; 8 Jalen Battles; 25 Marc Flores; 2 Scott Kelly; 14 Tyler Miller; 15 David Smith; Outfielders: 20 Joseph Carpenter; 7 Nick Lucky; 34 Jake Thompson; 11 Tyler Robertson	Manager: 23 Ross Peeples; Coaches: 37 Mark Johnson (pitching); 22 Troy Steffy (hitting); Disabled list; ‡ Inactive list; § Suspended list; updated April 22, 2026

== Retired numbers ==
42 (Jackie Robinson)
2B, Retired throughout professional baseball on April 15, 1997

== Major League Baseball alumni ==
- Cam Booser
- Phil Coke
- Scott Patterson
- Fernando Perez
- Jason Perry
- Matt Watson
- Daryle Ward
- Jerome Williams
- Marcus Walden
- Lance Zawadzki
- Charlie Zink

Achievements
Preceded by Long Island Ducks; 2013	Atlantic League Champions; Lancaster Stormers; 2014	Succeeded by Somerset Patriots; 2015
Preceded by Somerset Patriots; 2005	Atlantic League Champions; Lancaster Stormers; 2006	Succeeded by Newark Bears; 2007

Achievements
Preceded by York Revolution; 2011	Freedom Division Champions; Lancaster Stormers; 2012	Succeeded by Somerset Patriots; 2013
Preceded by Somerset Patriots; 2005	South Division Champions; Lancaster Stormers; 2006	Succeeded by Somerset Patriots; 2007
