= Prospector Baseball Group =

Owners of Minor League Baseball teams

- Industry: Sports management
- Founded: 2025; 1 year ago
- Key people: John Abbamondi, principal owner Ben Boyer, principal owner
- Website: prospectorbaseball.com

Prospector Baseball Group (PBG) is an American sports ownership and management group that operates three baseball teams in the United States. PBG was established in 2025 by sports executive John Abbamondi and venture capitalist Ben Boyer. The company owns the Minor League Baseball (MiLB) Akron RubberDucks, Jacksonville Jumbo Shrimp, and the Atlantic League of Professional Baseball (ALPB) Lancaster Stormers. The company plans to acquire as many as 15 baseball teams, made up of MiLB and independent clubs.

== History ==
The company was founded in 2025 by John Abbamondi and Ben Boyer. Abbamondi was the chief executive officer of the Brooklyn Nets and BSE Global, the former senior director of labor economics for Major League Baseball, an assistant general manager of the St. Louis Cardinals, and vice president of strategy and business analysis for the San Diego Padres. Boyer is an entrepreneur and investor who co-founded Tenaya Capital, R‑Zero, and Honor Pet.

In October 2025, the company purchased the Lancaster Stormers, an independent baseball league team in the Atlantic League of Professional Baseball. At the time, Abbamondi and Boyer stated an intention to purchase up to 15 total teams, made up of both MiLB and independent clubs. In December 2025, Prospector Baseball Group acquired the Jacksonville Jumbo Shrimp, a Triple-A baseball team in the International League, and the Akron RubberDucks, a Double-A baseball team in the Eastern League. The Jumbo Shrimp, an affiliate of the Miami Marlins, and the RubberDucks, an affiliate of the Cleveland Guardians, were both acquired from Ken Babby of Fast Forward Sports Group, who sold the two minor league teams after his acquisition and hiring as the CEO of the Tampa Bay Rays.

In December 2025, Arctos Partners came on board as the lead financial and strategic partner for PBG.

== Sports properties ==
=== Baseball ===
Teams owned by Prospector Baseball Group
| Team | League | Level | Affiliate | Acquired | Owned Stadium |
|---|---|---|---|---|---|
| Akron RubberDucks | Eastern League | Double-A | Cleveland Guardians | 2025 | N/A |
| Jacksonville Jumbo Shrimp | International League | Triple-A | Miami Marlins | 2025 | N/A |
| Lancaster Stormers | Atlantic League of Professional Baseball | Independent League | N/A | 2025 | N/A |
