= Peter B. Freund =

American sportsteam owner and executive (born 1976)

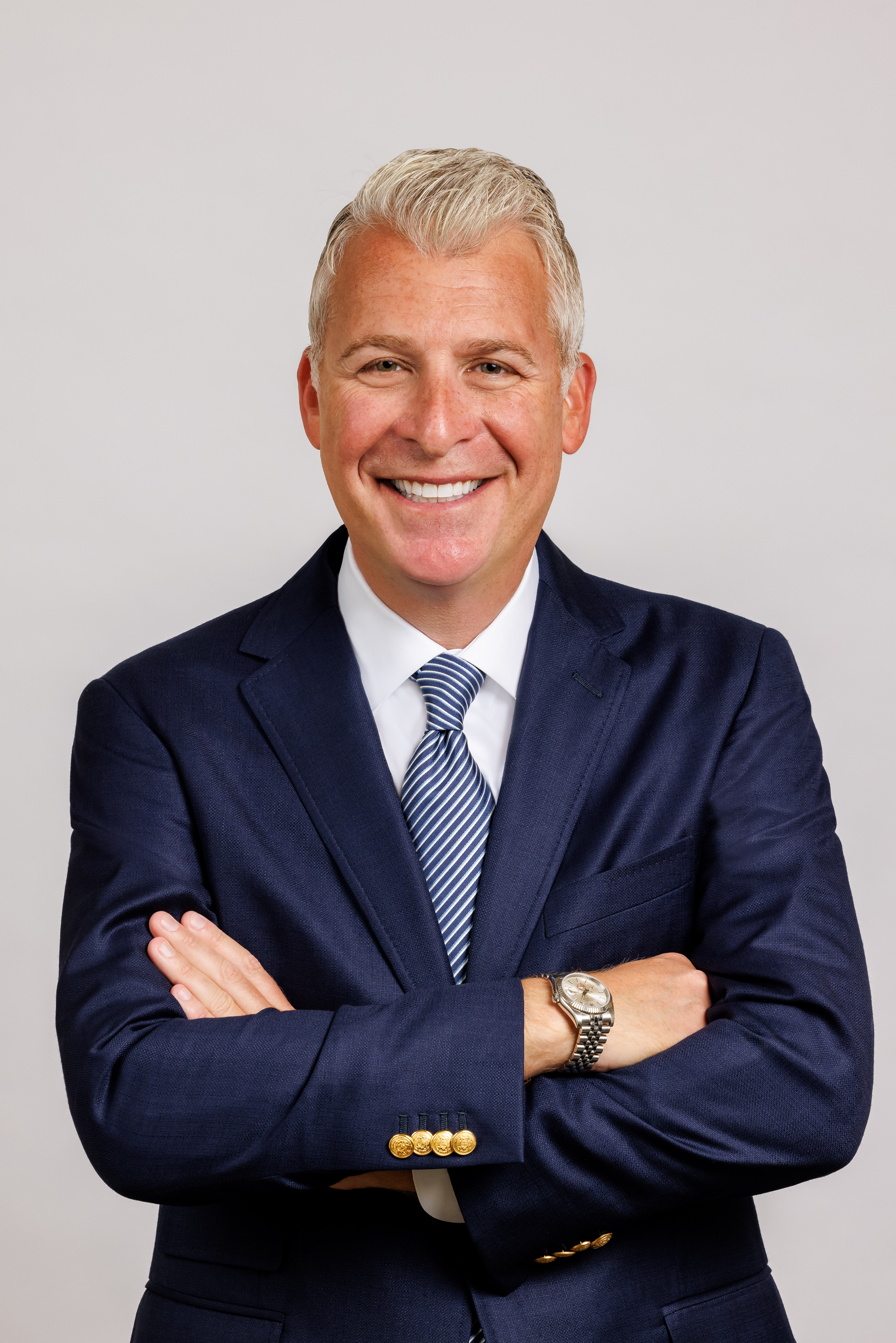
- Born: April 19, 1976 (age 50)
- Education: Dartmouth College (BS)
- Employer: Diamond Baseball Holdings
- Title: CEO

Peter B. Freund (born April 19, 1976) is an American sports team owner and executive. Freund is the CEO of Diamond Baseball Holdings (DBH), which owns and operates 48 affiliated Minor League Baseball (MiLB) teams throughout North America. He is also a minority owner of the New York Yankees and, through his investment firm, Trinity Sports Holdings, acquired a majority ownership stake in the English football club Dagenham & Redbridge F.C.

== Early life and education ==
Freund was born on April 19, 1976, and graduated from the Horace Mann School in Riverdale, Bronx, New York City. He graduated in 1991 from Rippowam Cisqua School, a private co-educational day school in Bedford, New York. A former chair of its board of trustees, he now is a trustee emeritus. He is also a current trustee at the Berkshire School in Sheffield, Massachusetts. He graduated with a Bachelor of Arts from Dartmouth College in 1998.

== Career ==
Freund was the president of Trinity Packaging Corporation until it was acquired by ProAmpac in 2017. Freund's family had owned Trinity Packaging Company for four-generations, dating back to 1917. Freund sold the family business to solely focus on sports ownership and management.

He is the principal owner of Trinity Sports Holdings and Trinity Baseball Holdings. As part of Trinity Sports Holdings, Freund became owner of teams in Major League Baseball, Minor League Baseball, and two professional soccer teams.

In 2016, Freund became the principal owner of the Memphis Redbirds, a Triple-A Minor League Baseball team.

In 2017, Ballpark Digest named Trinity Sports Holdings the Organization of the Year, "for overseeing two accomplished teams in strikingly different markets", referring to the Memphis Redbirds and Williamsport Crosscutters. The award was bestowed for hosting the inaugural MLB Little League Classic in Williamsport, Pennsylvania and for successfully rebranding the Redbirds and renovating its home ballpark, AutoZone Park.

In January 2018, Freund launched Memphis 901 FC, a professional soccer team in the USL Championship, alongside principal owners Craig Unger and former U.S. National Team goalkeeper Tim Howard.

In September 2018, through his sports investment firm, Freund and Craig Unger acquired a majority stake in the English National League club Dagenham & Redbridge F.C. In 2018, Freund, along with his business partners, Tim Howard and Craig Unger, were reportedly interested in purchasing a controlling interest in Aston Villa F.C. for £75 million, but ultimately did not purchase the club.

In October 2020, Major League Baseball appointed Freund to work with the Office of the Commissioner during the reorganization of the Professional Development League system. In this role, he helped guide the transition of Minor League Baseball (MiLB) to direct MLB operation and coordinated the restructuring of the system to 120 affiliated teams.

Following the 2021 reorganization of the Minor League Baseball system, Freund and Pat Battle launched Diamond Baseball Holdings (DBH), a subsidiary of the investment firm Silver Lake. Freund oversaw the company's initial formation and rollout with the acquisition of an initial wave of franchises, including Triple-A flagships like the Scranton/Wilkes-Barre RailRiders, Iowa Cubs, and Memphis Redbirds. As of February 2026, DBH owns and operates 48 Minor League baseball teams across North America, with Freund as the company's chief executive officer.

In January 2024, Freund announced he was seeking to sell his majority stake in the club, stepping down as Executive Chairman later that year; he remained with Dagenham & Redbridge as a director and member of the board.

Freund is on the board of directors for the Pacific Coast League, a Triple-A baseball league, and the New York–Penn League.

== Sports teams ==
=== Trinity Sports Holdings ===
Current teams owned
Team	Sport	League	Years	Role	Notes
Charleston RiverDogs	Baseball	Carolina League	2009–present	Partner	Minority ownership
New York Yankees	Baseball	Major League Baseball	2011–present	Minority owner	Minority ownership
Williamsport Crosscutters	Baseball	MLB Draft League	2014–present	Principal owner	Collegiate summer baseball league team

Former teams
Team	Sport	League	Years	Notes
Dagenham & Redbridge F.C.	Soccer	National League (English football)	2018–2024	Sold to Club Underdog. Owned with Tim Howard and Craig Unger
Memphis 901 FC	Soccer	USL Championship	2018–2024	
Memphis Redbirds	Baseball	International League	2016–2021	In 2021, sold to Diamond Baseball Holdings
Wilmington Sharks	Baseball	Coastal Plain League	2013–2014	Collegiate summer baseball league team

== Personal life ==
Freund is a Trustee of the Berkshire School in Sheffield, Massachusetts.

Freund lives in Bedford, New York and Big Sky, Montana.
