= List of Major League Baseball principal owners =

Current Major League Baseball team owners and the principal corporate entities that operate the clubs:

== List ==
Team	Principal owner(s)	Operating entities	Purchase price	Year Acquired
Arizona Diamondbacks	Ken Kendrick	AZPB LP, AZPBI Inc.	$130,000,000	1995
Atlanta Braves	Atlanta Braves Holdings Inc.	Atlanta National League Baseball Club Inc.	$450,000,000^{[a]}	2007
Baltimore Orioles	David Rubenstein	Baltimore Orioles LP, Baltimore Orioles Inc., Baltimore Baseball Club Inc.	$1,725,000,000	2024
Boston Red Sox	John W. Henry	Boston Red Sox Baseball Club LP, Fenway Sports Group LLC	$660,000,000	2002
Chicago Cubs	Thomas S. Ricketts	Chicago Cubs Baseball Club, LLC	$845,000,000	2009
Chicago White Sox	Jerry Reinsdorf	Chicago White Sox Ltd., Chisox Corp.	$20,000,000	1981
Cincinnati Reds	Bob Castellini	Cincinnati Reds LLC	$270,000,000	2006
Cleveland Guardians	Paul Dolan	Cleveland Guardians Baseball Co. LLC	$323,000,000	1999
Colorado Rockies	Charlie Monfort	Colorado Baseball Partnership, Colorado Rockies Baseball Club Ltd.	$95,000,000	1992
Detroit Tigers	Christopher Ilitch	Olympia Entertainment, Detroit Tigers Inc.	$82,000,000	1992
Houston Astros	Jim Crane	Crane Capital Group, Houston Astros Inc., Houston Astros, LLC	$615,000,000	2011
Kansas City Royals	John Sherman	Kansas City Royals Baseball Corp.	$1,000,000,000	2020
Los Angeles Angels	Arte Moreno	Angels Baseball LP, Moreno Baseball LP	$184,000,000	2003
Los Angeles Dodgers	Mark Walter	Guggenheim Baseball Management, Los Angeles Dodgers, Inc.	$2,000,000,000	2012
Miami Marlins	Bruce Sherman	Miami Marlins LP, Miami Marlins Inc., Miami Marlins Baseball Ltd.	$1,300,000,000	2018
Milwaukee Brewers	Mark Attanasio	Milwaukee Brewers Baseball Club, Milwaukee Brewers Holdings LLC	$223,000,000	2005
Minnesota Twins	Jim Pohlad	Minnesota Twins, MTI Partnership LLP	$44,000,000	1984
New York Mets	Steve Cohen	Point72 Asset, Mets Partners Inc.	$2,475,000,000	2020
New York Yankees	Hal Steinbrenner	Yankee Global Enterprises	$8,700,000	1973
Athletics	John J. Fisher	Oakland Athletics Limited Partnership	$180,000,000	2005
Philadelphia Phillies	John Middleton	The Phillies	$30,000,000	1981
Pittsburgh Pirates	Robert Nutting	Pittsburgh Associates LP, Pittsburgh Baseball Inc.	$92,000,000	1996
San Diego Padres	José E. Feliciano Kwanza Jones	Kwanza Jones & José E. Feliciano Initiative	$3,900,000,000	2026
San Francisco Giants	Charlie Johnson	San Francisco Baseball Associates LP, SF Giants Baseball Club	$100,000,000	1992
Seattle Mariners	John W. Stanton	Baseball Club of Seattle LP, Baseball of Seattle Inc.	$106,000,000	1992
St. Louis Cardinals	William DeWitt Jr.	St. Louis Cardinals LLC, St. Louis National Baseball Club Inc.	$150,000,000^{[b]}	1995
Tampa Bay Rays	Patrick Zalupski	Tampa Bay Rays Ltd., Dream Finders Homes	$1,700,000,000	2025
Texas Rangers	Ray Davis	Rangers Baseball Express, Texas Rangers Baseball Club	$593,000,000	2010
Toronto Blue Jays	Rogers Communications	Rogers Blue Jays Baseball Partnership, Toronto Blue Jays Baseball Ltd	$140,000,000	2000
Washington Nationals	Lerner Enterprises	Washington Nationals Baseball Club LLC	$450,000,000	2006

=== Notes ===
1. ^{a} The Atlanta Braves sale in 2007 to Liberty Media was part of a complex swap of cash, stock, magazine holdings, and the Braves, in which Time Warner sent the Braves, a hobbyist publishing company, and $980,000,000 to Liberty in exchange for approximately 68.5 million shares of Time Warner stock, at the time worth $1.48 billion. It was announced and confirmed that the Braves were given a value of $450,000,000 in the transaction.
2. ^{b} The price for the St. Louis Cardinals included Busch Stadium.
3. ^{c} As much as $200,000,000 of the sale price included the team's 20-percent stake in Fox Sports San Diego.

== See also ==
- List of current NHL franchise owners
- List of current NFL franchise owners
- List of NBA team owners
- List of MLS team owners
