= List of defunct military academies in the United States =

This is a list of military academies in the United States that are now defunct. Some of these schools have been absorbed into other organizations, or continued under changed name.

== A ==
- Abingdon Male Academy (VA)
- Admiral Billard Naval Academy (CT)
- Admiral Farragut Academy (NJ)
- Advance Military Academy (AR)
- Aiken Military Academy (SC)
- Alabama Military Institute (AL)
- Alabama Military & Scientific Institute (AL)
- Alachua Military Institute (FL)
- Alamo Military Academy (TX)
- Albany Military Academy (NY)
- Albemarle Military Institute (VA)
- Alexander Institute (AR)
- Alexander Military Institute (NY)
- Allen Military Academy (TX)
- Allen Military School (MA)
- Amarillo Military Academy (TX)
- American Classical and Military Lyceum (PA)
- American Literary Scientific and Military Academy (VT)
- American Military Academy (CA)
- Ames Military School
- Anchorage Classical and Military Academy (KY)
- Anderson Military Academy (CA)
- Arizona Military Academy (AZ)
- Arkansas Military Academy (AR)
- Arkansas Military Institute (AR)
- Army & Navy Preparatory School (MD)
- Arrow Rock Military Academy (MO)
- Arsenal Academy (SC)
- Asheville Military Academy (MA)
- Ashfield Military Academy (AR)
- Astoria Military Academy (NY)
- Atlanta Air Academy (NH)
- Auburn Military Academy
- Augusta Military Academy (VA)
- Austin Military Academy (TX)
- Austin Normal Military School (TX)

== B ==
- Bailey Military Institute (SC)
- Barbour Hall Junior Military Academy (MI)
- Bard Hall (NY)
- Barnard Military School (NY)
- Bastrop Military Institute (TX)
- Baylor School (TN)
- Bealey Military Academy (OR)
- Beaumont Military Academy (OR)
- Belmont Military Academy (CA)
- Benedictine Military Institute (GA)
- Bethel Military Academy (VA)
- Betts Military Academy (CT)
- Bingham Military School (NC)
- Bingham's Military School (MD)
- Bishop Military Academy (TX)
- Bishop Quarter Junior Military Academy (IL)
- Bishop Scott Military Academy (OR)
- Black-Foxe Military Institute (CA)
- Blackstone Military Academy (VA)
- Blakely Military Institute (GA)
- Blees Military Academy (MO)
- Bolles School of Florida (FL)
- Bordentown Military Institute (NJ)
- Bowden Collegiate & Military Institute (GA)
- Brandon State Military Institute (MS)
- Branham and Hughes Military Academy (TN)
- Breck Military School
- Brennan's Military Academy (TN)
- Brentwood Military Academy (CA)
- Brentwood Military Academy (OH)
- Briarley Hall Military Academy (MD)
- Bridgeport Commercial & Military Academy (CT)
- Brier Patch Military School
- Brook Military Academy (OH)
- Brown Military Academy (CA)
- Brown Military Academy (CT)
- Brown Military Academy of the Ozarks (AR)
- Brownsville Military Academy (TN)
- The Bullis School (MD)
- Bunker Hill Military Academy (IL)
- Burbank Military Academy (CA)
- Burlington Military Academy/College (NJ)
- Burnside Military School (VT)

== C ==
- Calvary Military Academy (NY)
- Camden Point Military Institute (MO)
- Cape Fear Military Academy (NC)
- Captain James D. Cobb's Military School (VA)
- Cardinal Farley Military Academy (NY)
- Carlin Military Academy (CA)
- Carlisle Military Institute (TX)
- Carlisle Military School (SC)
- Carolina Military Academy (NC)
- Carolina Military Institute (NC)
- Carolina Military-Naval Academy (NC)
- Carson Military and Naval Institute (MI)
- Carson Long Military Academy (PA)
- Castle Heights Military Academy (TN)
- Caswell Academy (NY)
- Catawba Military Academy (NC)
- Catawba Military Academy (SC)
- Cayuga Lake Military Academy (NY)
- Chaddock Boys School (IL)
- Chamberlain Military Institute (NY)
- Charlotte Hall Military Academy (MD)
- Charlotte Military Institute (NC)
- Chapultepec Military Academy (TX)
- Chauncey Hall School (MA)
- Cheltenham Military Academy (PA)
- Cheshire Military Academy (CT)
- Chester Military Academy
- Cheviot Hills Military Academy (CA)
- Christian Brother College Military High School (MO)
- Church Military School (MD)
- Churchill's Military Academy (NY)
- Clason Point Military Academy (NY)
- Clinton Liberal Institute & Military Academy (NY)
- Coe Military Academy (IL)
- Collegiate Institute (NC)
- Colonel Edgar's Military Academy (KY)
- Colorado Military School (CO)
- Columbia Military Academy (TN)
- Connecticut Military Academy (CT)
- Cook Academy (NY)
- Coral Gables Military Academy (FL)
- Cornado Military Academy (CA)
- Corpus Christi Military Academy (TX)
- Cromwell Military Academy (CA)
- Crossed Rifles Military Academy
- Croton Military Institute (NY)

== D ==
- Danforth Military Academy (WI)
- Danville Classical & Military Institute (KY)
- Danville Military Institute (VA)
- DeBerry Military Academy (TN)
- Delaware Military Academy (DE) The current Delaware Military Academy was established in 2003.
- De La Salle Military Academy (NY)
- Davis Military Academy (CA)
- Davis Military School (NC)
- Del Monte Military Academy (CA)
- De Meritte Military Academy (NJ)
- De Veaux School (NY)
- De Vitte Military Academy (NJ)
- Donaldson Military School (NC)
- Dr. Holbrook's Military School (NY)

== E ==
- Eagleswood Military Academy (NJ)
- East Florida Seminary (FL)
- Eastern Military Academy (NY)
- Eastern Military Academy (CT)
- Edgar Military School (AL)
- Edgehill Military School (NJ)
- Edwards Military Institute (NC)
- El Paso Military Institute (TX)
- Elberton Military Academy (GA)
- Elm City Military Institute (CT)
- Elsinore Naval & Military School (CA)
- Endymion Military School (NY)
- Episcopal Military Institute (KS)
- Epworth Military Academy (IA)
- Etowah Military Institute (GA)
- Everest Military Academy (CT)

== F ==
- Fayetteville Literary, Scientific and Military School (NC)
- Fayetteville Military Academy (NC)
- Ferrell Military School (KY)
- Ferrell's Military Institute (LA)
- Fitzgerald and Clark School (TN)
- Fleetwood Academy (VA)
- Florida Collegiate & Military Institute (FL)
- Florida Military Academy (FL)
- Florida Military Institute (FL)
- Florida Military School & College (FL)
- Florida Naval Academy (FL)
- Forest Military Academy (KY)
- Forest Military School (TX)
- Fort Worth Military Academy (TX)
- Francis Military Academy (NJ)
- Franklin Military Institute (VA)
- Franklin Military School (NC)
- Frederick Military Academy (VA)
- Free Military School (PA)
- Freehold Military School (NJ)
- French Camp Military Academy (MS)

== G ==
- Garden Military Academy (TX)
- General McArthur Military Academy (NJ)
- General Pan tops Academy (AL)
- Georgia Military Academy (GA)
- Georgia Military Institute (GA)
- Georgia Southern Military College (GA)
- Gideon s Military Academy (TX)
- Gibson F. Hill's Military Academy (AL)
- Glen Turner Military School (CA)
- Glenlivet Male Collegiate & Military Institute (AL)
- Golden State Military Academy (CA)
- Golden West Military Academy (CA)
- Gordon Military College (GA)
- Goss Military Institute (NM)
- Grand Prairie Seminary (IL)
- Green Gate Military School (UNK)
- Green ville Military Academy (MS)
- Greenville Military Institute (SC)
- Greenbrier Military School (WV)
- Gulf Coast Military Academy (MS)
- Gymnasium and Military Institute (NH)

== H ==
- Haggett Military Academy (KY)
- Hampton Military Academy (VA)
- Hanson's Military Academy (IL)
- Harding Military Academy (CA)
- Harding Military School (TX)
- Harker Academy (CA) (Now, The Harker School)
- Harris Military Institute (VA)
- Harrisburg Military Academy (PA)
- Harvard Military Academy (TX)
- Harvard Military School (CA)
- Henderson Military & Female Institute (NC)
- Highland Park Military Academy (MA)
- Highland Military Academy (MA)
- Hill Military Academy (OR)
- Hillsboro Military Academy
- Hillsborough Military Academy (NC)
- Hinfield Academy (VA)
- Hitchcock Military Academy (CA)
- Hoge Memorial Military Academy (VA)
- Hogsett Military Academy (KY)
- Hollywood Military Academy (CA)
- Hollywood Military Academy (CA)
- Honolulu Military Academy (HI)
- Hoover Military Academy (VA)
- Horner Military School (NC)
- Howe Military Academy (IN)
- Hudson River Military Academy (NY)
- Huntsville Military Academy (AL)
- Hurt Military School (AL)

== I ==
- Illinois Military School (IL)
- Ingles Military High School (GA)
- Inter-American Military Academy (FL)
- Irving Military Academy (IL)
- Isaac Shelby County Military Academy (KY)

== J ==
- Jackson Military Academy & School of Fine Arts (MO)
- Jarvis Military Academy (CT)
- Jarvis Hall Military Academy (CO)
- Jefferson Military College (MS)
- Jefferson Military School (GA)
- John F. Kennedy Military School
- John Holbrook's Military School (DC)
- Jones Military School (NC)
- Jordan Hall Military School (VT)
- Junior Military Academy (TN)
- Junior Military Academy (IL)

== K ==
- Kamehameha Military School (HI)
- Kanawha Military Institute (WV)
- Kansas Military Academy (KS)
- Kearney Military Academy (NE)
- Kelley Military Academy (KS)
- Kemper Military School & Junior College (MO)
- Kentucky Military Institute (KY)
- Kenyon Military Academy (OH)
- King's Mountain Military School (SC)
- Kinston Military Institute (NC)
- Kirkwood Military Academy (MO)
- Kyle Military Institute (NY)

== L ==
- La Fayette Military Academy (GA)
- La Monte Military Academy (CA)
- Lagrange College & Military Academy (AL)
- Lagrange Military Academy (AL)
- La Grange Military Academy (TN)
- La Salle Military Academy (NY)
- Le Mans Academy (IN)
- Lancaster Military Academy (TX)
- Latah Military Academy (WA)
- Lawrenceburg Military Academy (TN)
- Lee Military Academy (VA)
- Lenoir County Military School (NC)
- Linsly Military Institute (WV)
- Linton Hall Military School (VA)
- Literary, Scientific and Military Academy (NJ)
- Livingston Military Academy (AL)
- Lodwick Aviation Military Academy (FL)
- Long Beach Military Academy (CA)
- Los Angeles Military Academy (CA)
- Los Ceritos Military Academy (CA)
- Louisiana Military Academy (LA)
- Louisiana State Seminary of Learning & Military Academy (LA)
- Louisville Military Academy (KY)
- Lovejoy Military Academy (NC)
- Lowery-Phillips School (TX)
- Lukin Military Academy (TX)
- Lynnland Military Institute (KY)

== M ==
- Macon Military Academy (MO)
- Madison Military Academy (CT)
- The Manlius School (NY)
- Mantua Classical & Military Academy (PA)
- Marcell Military Academy (CA)
- Marengo Military Institute (AL)
- Marmaduke Military Academy (MO)
- Marmion Military Academy (IL)
- Maryland Agricultural College (later University of Maryland at College Park) (MD)
- Maryland Military and Naval Academy (MD)
- Marymount Military Academy (WA)
- Massey Military School (TN)
- McCallie School (TN)
- McDonogh School (MD)
- McMinn Military Academy (TN)
- Media Milicademy for Young Boys (PA)
- Meridian Military School & College (MS)
- Miami Military Academy (FL)
- Miami Military Institute (OH)
- Michigan Military Academy (MI)
- Midwest Junior Military School (IL)
- Midwest Military Academy (IL)
- Millard Preparatory School for West Point (DC)
- Millard School (OR)
- Miller School of Albemarle (VA)
- Millersburg Military Institute (KY)
- Mississippi Military Academy (MS)
- Missouri Literary, Scientific & Military Academy (MO)
- Mitchell Military Boys School (MA)
- Mobile Military Institute (AL)
- Mohegan Military Academy (NY)
- Mohican Military Academy (NY)
- Montclair Military Academy (NJ)
- Montrose Military Academy (NJ)
- Morgan Park Military Academy (IL)
- Mt. Beacon Military Academy (NY)
- Mt. Lowe Military Academy (CA)
- Mt. Pleasant Military Academy (NY)
- Mount Saint Joseph Semi-Military Academy (NY)
- Mount Sterling Literary, Scientific and Military Academy (KY)
- Mount Tamalpais Military Academy (CA)
- Mt. Vernon Military Academy (IL)
- Mountville Military Institute (GA)
- Moye Military School (TX)
- Murphreesboro Military Academy (TN)

== N ==
- Nashville Military Academy (TN)
- National Scientific and Military Academy (DE)
- Nazareth Hall Military Academy (PA)
- Nazareth Hall Military School (OH)
- Nebraska Military Academy (NE)
- New Bern Military Academy (NC)
- New England Military Academy (MA)
- New Hampshire Military Academy (NH)
- New Jersey Military Academy (NJ)
- New Jersey Naval Academy (NJ)
- New Orleans Military Academy (LA)
- Newport News Military Academy (VA)
- Newton Hall Military Academy (NJ)
- North Carolina Military Academy (NC)
- North Carolina Military Institute (NC)
- North Granville Military Academy (NY)
- North Shore Military Academy (IL)
- North Valley Military Institute (CA)
- Northern Missouri Academy (MO)
- Northridge Military Academy (CA)
- Northwestern Military Academy (IL)

== O ==
- Oak Hill Military Academy (NC)
- Oakland Military Academy (CA)
- Oakland Military Academy (NJ)
- Ogden Military Academy (UT)
- Ohio Military College (OH)
- Ohio Military Institute (OH)
- Oklahoma Air Academy (OK)
- Oklahoma Military Academy (OK)
- Old Dominion Military Academy (VA)
- Old Point Comfort Military School (VA)
- Onarga Military School (IL)
- Oneonta Military Academy (CA)
- Orange Military Academy (NJ)
- Oregon Military Academy (OR)

== P ==
- Pacific Maritime Academy (HI)
- Pacific Military Academy (CA)
- Page Military School (CA)
- Palm Beach Military Academy (FL)
- Palo Alto Military Academy (CA)
- Park Military Academy (CA)
- Park Ridge Military Academy (IL)
- Partridge Military Academy (CT)
- Paterson Military Academy (NJ)
- Patrick Military Institute (SC)
- Peacock Military Academy (TX)
- Pecks Military Academy (CT)
- Peekskill Military Academy (NY)
- Pennsylvania Literary, Scientific and Military Academy (PA)
- Pennsylvania Military Academy (PA)
- Pennsylvania Military College (PA)
- Pennsylvania Military Institute (PA)
- Pershing Military Institute (CA)
- Petersburg Military Academy (VA)
- Phelps Military Academy (UNK)
- Philadelphia Military Academy (PA)
- Pillsbury Military Academy (MN)
- Pine Forest Military Academy (NY)
- Pine Ridge Military Academy (NJ)
- Ponca Military Academy (OK)
- Porter Military Academy (SC)
- Poughkeepsie Military Institute (NY)
- Puget Sound Naval Academy (aka Hill Naval Academy) (WA)
- Pullman Military Academy (WA)
- Putnam Military Academy (OH)

== Q ==
- Quincy Military Academy (FL)

== R ==
- Racine Military School (WI)
- Raenford Military School (CA)
- Raleigh Military Academy (NC)
- Ramsey Military School (CA)
- Rappahannock Academy & Military Institute (VA)
- Redondo Military Academy (CA)
- Rhodes Military Institute (NC)
- Rice Creek Spring Military Academy (SC)
- Richmond County Military Academy (GA)
- Ridgewood Military Academy (CA)
- Ringgold Military Academy (VA)
- Riverview Military Academy (NY)
- Rock River Military Academy (IL)
- Rockingham Military Institute (VA)
- Rockland Military Academy (NH)
- Roosevelt Military Academy (IL)
- Roosevelt Military Academy (NJ)
- Rugby Military Academy (KY)
- Rugby Military Academy (LA)
- Rugby Military Academy (NY)
- Russell Military Academy (CT)
- Rumford Academy (VA)
- Rutherfordton Military Institute
- Rutland Military School (VT)

== S ==
- Sackett Harbor Military Academy (NY)
- Sacred Heart Military Academy (IN)
- Sacred Heart Military Academy (NY)
- St. Aloyisius Military Academy (OH)
- St. Austin's Military School (NY)
- St. Charles Military College (MO)
- St. Edwards Military Academy (TX)
- St. Emma Military Academy (VA)
- St. James Military Academy (MO)
- St. James Military Academy (MN)
- St. John's Academy (VA)
- St. John's Academy (CA)
- St. John's Military School (KS)
- St. John's Military Academy (WI)
- St. John's Military School (NY)
- St. Joseph College & Military Academy (KS)
- St. Joseph's Jr Military Academy (PA)
- St. Joseph's Military Academy (CA)
- St. Louis Military Academy (MO)
- St. Matthews Military Academy (CA)
- St. Matthew's Hall Military School
- St. Norbert Military College (WI)
- St. Patrick's Military Academy (NY)
- St. Paul Military Academy (VA)
- Salem Military Academy (KY)
- Salisbury Military School (NC)
- St. Joseph's Jr Military Academy (PA)
- San Diego Military Academy (CA)
- San Rafael Military Academy (CA)
- Sanford Naval Academy (FL)
- Schatlock Hall Military Academy (MN)
- Schreiner Institute (TX)
- Scientific and Military Collegiate Institute (PA)
- Seale Military Academy (CA)
- Selleck Overlook Military Academy (CT)
- Selma Military Institute (AL)
- Sepulveda Military Academy (CA)
- Sewanee Military Academy (TN)
- Shattuck Military School (MN)
- Shelby Military Institute (TN)
- Sierra Military Academy (CA)
- Silver Lake Military & Naval School (NY)
- Sing Sing Military Academy (NY)
- South Carolina Military Academy (SC)
- South Florida Military Academy (FL)
- South Florida Military and Educational Institute (FL)
- South Norwalk Military Institute (CT)
- Southern California Military Academy (CA)
- Southern Military Academy (GA)
- Southern Military Institute (VA)
- Southwestern Military Academy (CA)
- Southwestern Military Academy (AZ)
- Spears-Langfod Military Academy (AR)
- Springside Military Institute (MA)
- Stamford Military Academy (CT)
- Stamford Military Academy (NY)
- Starr's Military Academy (NY)
- Staunton Military Academy (VA)
- Stella Niagara Cadet School (NY)
- Stonehurst Military and Naval Academy (CA)
- Suffield Military Academy (CT)
- Suffolk Military Academy (VA)
- Sumter Military Academy (SC)
- Sweetwater Military College (TN)

== T ==
- Talladega Military Academy (AL)
- Tampa Military Academy (FL)
- Taylor Military School (AL)
- Tennessee Military Institute (TN)
- Texas Military College (TX)
- Texas Monument & Military Institute (TX)
- Torrance Military Academy (CA)
- Trinity Military Institute (NY)
- Tupelo Military Institute (MS)
- Tugalo Institute (GA)

== U ==
- Unity Scientific & Military Academy (NH)
- University Military Academy (MO)
- University Military School (AL)
- University Military School (TX)
- Urban Military Academy (CA)

== V ==
- Verner Military Institute (AL)
- Vireum Military Academy (NY)
- Virginia Literary, Scientific, & Military Academy (VA)

== W ==
- Warren County Military Institute (KY)
- Webster Military Institute (VA)
- Welch Military Academy (MO)
- Wenonah Military Academy (NJ)
- Wentworth Military Academy (MO)
- West Alabama Institute (AL)
- West Coast Military Academy (CA)
- West Florida Seminary (FL)
- West Lake Military Academy (CA)
- Westchester Military Academy (TX)
- Western Military Academy (IL)
- Western Military Institute (KY & TN)
- Western Springs Military Academy
- Westover Military Academy (VA)
- Weymans Military School (MO)
- Williams Military Academy (IL)
- Williamsburg Military Academy (VA)
- Wilmington Literary, Scientific and Military Academy (DE)
- Wilson Military Academy (NJ)
- Worthington Military Academy (NE)
- Worrall Hall Military Academy (NY)
- Wright's Military Academy (AL)
- Wyler Military School (FL)
- Wytheville Military Academy (VA)

== Y ==
- Yonkers Military Institute (NY)

== See also ==
- United States service academies
- U.S. military staff colleges
