= Elsinore Naval and Military School =

Military school in Lake Elsinore, California, United States

Coordinates: 33.6576833°N 117.3732556°W

- Lake Elsinore, California, California; United States

Information
- Type: Military school, boarding
- Established: 1933
- Closed: 1977

Elsinore Naval and Military School was a military boarding school in California. It was built in 1924, and was originally intended to be the "Southern California Athletic and Country Club", catering to the wealthy and famous personalities who frequented Lake Elsinore in the 1920s. However, it never opened due to financial problems and the advent of the Great Depression.

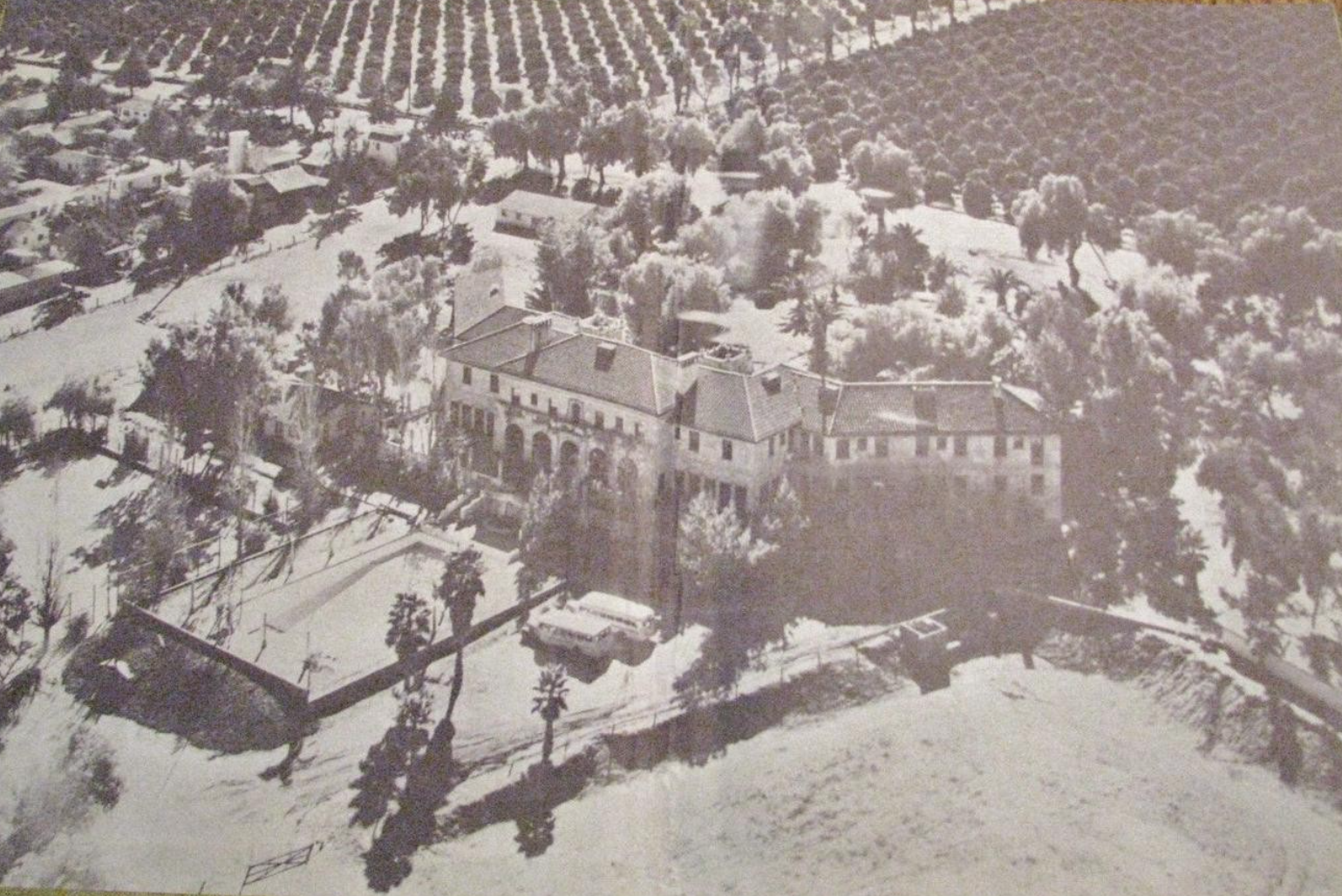
Elsinore Naval and Military School from 1955 yearbook

In 1933, the property was bought by Glenn Conklin, an employee at the Pacific Military Academy, later known as Cheviot Hills Military Academy, in Culver City, who dreamed of running and owning his own Military Academy. It was incorporated as the "Elsinore Naval Academy" that same year in 1933. The name was later changed to the Elsinore Naval and Military School. In 1977, the school officially closed.

Since then, the building has changed owners multiple times, and been victim to graffiti and vandalism. In 2012, volunteers removed thousands of bees from the site. Also in 2012, the company that owned the building made a statement of commitment to prevent it from becoming an eyesore.
