= William A. Patterson =

President of United Airlines from 1934 until 1966

William A. "Pat" Patterson (October, 1899 – June 13, 1980) was the President of United Airlines from 1934 until 1966.

== Life and career ==
Patterson was born on a sugarcane plantation in Waipahu on Oahu, Hawaii. When Patterson was 13, his widowed mother moved to San Francisco, California, while he remained at Honolulu Military Academy. Not liking the academy, he decided to leave. He persuaded a captain to allow him to work on his ship in exchange for passage to San Francisco.

Instead of finishing high school in San Francisco, Patterson became an office worker at Wells Fargo bank, though he later attended night school. He became a teller and later a loan officer.

As a loan officer, he authorized a loan to Pacific Air Transport and became an advisor to its founder and president Vern Gorst. When Gorst sold his airline to Boeing Air Transport, the advice that Gorst was receiving from Patterson brought the latter to the attention of Philip G. Johnson of Boeing.

Patterson was recruited by Johnson, leaving Wells Fargo in 1929, and moving to Seattle, Washington, to be the assistant to the president of Boeing Airplane Company and Boeing Air Transport. In 1931 Boeing Air Transport was one of four airlines that merged into United Air Lines and Patterson moved to Chicago to become United's general manager.

Two years later, Patterson was promoted to vice president of United. In 1934, in reaction to the Air Mail scandal and the departure of Johnson, Patterson became the company's president at the age of 34.

Patterson is credited with starting the profession of flight attendant. He gave his approval to hire eight nurses to work as flight attendants on a three-month trial basis. On May 15, 1930, United became the first airline to use flight attendants, a practice that has since been adopted by every major airline. Patterson's daughter, Patty, briefly worked for American Airlines as a flight attendant before her marriage rendered her ineligible. Patterson and C. R. Smith, the CEO of American, shared a friendly rivalry.

Under Patterson, United invested in new technologies, such as the DC-4 and the DC-8 a pioneering jet, and purchased Capital Airlines in 1961 to become the United States' largest airline, a title it would hold for nearly 40 years. In 1963, when Patterson became United's CEO and chairman of the board, the airline had more than 30,000 employees.

He was a life trustee of Northwestern University, and helped establish the Northwestern University Transportation Center in 1954. Patterson received the Tony Jannus Award in 1968 for his distinguished contributions to commercial aviation.

In 1976, for his contributions to aviation Patterson was inducted into the National Aviation Hall of Fame in Dayton, Ohio.

Patterson was inducted into the Junior Achievement U.S. Business Hall of Fame in 1980.

Near the end of his life, he was honored with the creation of the William A. Patterson Distinguished Chair in Transportation through the gifts of more than 12,000 individual and corporate donors. After his death in 1980, the Patterson Endowment established an annual Patterson Lecture and provided other research support.

In 2006, Patterson was inducted into the International Air & Space Hall of Fame at the San Diego Air & Space Museum.

== Family ==
Patterson's son, William A. Patterson Jr., was married to Marcia Motley, daughter of Arthur Harrison Motley.

== See also ==
- United Airlines
