= Fleetwood Academy =

- King and Queen County, Virginia; United States

Information
- Type: Private military academy
- Established: 1839
- Founder: Oliver White
- Status: Closed
- Closed: 1860
- Gender: Boys
- Accreditation: Rural

Fleetwood Academy was a military school for boys located in King and Queen County, Virginia, six miles north of Bruington Baptist Church. Modeled after the Virginia Military Institute, a state military college also founded in 1839, Fleetwood Academy operated for 21 years, closing in 1860.

== History ==
Founded in 1839 by Oliver White, Fleetwood Academy consisted of a two-story schoolhouse and three one-story dormitories. Fleetwood Academy was noted for offering courses in mathematics, Greek, French, and natural philosophy, with an estimated yearly enrollment of thirty-five to forty cadets. In 1848, the school was issued forty muskets by the Virginia government, to be used for instructing the students in military exercises. In operation for approximately twenty-one years, Fleetwood Academy closed in 1860. The academy, its cadets, and its founder, Oliver White, were held in high regard by citizens of King and Queen County.

A section of The Beginnings of Public Education in Virginia, a book published in 1917 by A.J. Morrison, reads:

‘About the year 1839, a Scotchman of culture and wise forecast, came to us and established an academy at Fleetwood, some six miles above Bruington Church. This gentleman, Mr. White, deserves the everlasting gratitude of our people, within and beyond the borders of the county. He erected a standard which is telling today upon a number of pupils who do him honor.’

== Notable alumni ==
- Robert Latane Montague, 4th Lieutenant Governor of Virginia

== See also ==
- List of defunct military academies in the United States
