= North Carolina Military Institute =

Former school in North Carolina, United States

Location
- Charlotte, North Carolina; United States; 35°13′05.1″N 80°50′54.9″W

Information
- Established: October 1859
- Founder: Dr. Charles J. Fox
- Closed: April 1861
- Superintendent: Major Daniel H. Hill
- Gender: All male
- Enrollment: 150 (1860–61)

The North Carolina Military Institute was an antebellum state-supported military school in Charlotte, North Carolina. It closed at the beginning of the American Civil War, when Governor John W. Ellis ordered the corps of cadets to duty as drill masters in Raleigh. Many of whom later enlisted in the 1st North Carolina Volunteers and served under Colonel Daniel H. Hill, the former superintendent.

== History ==
North Carolina Military Institute was established in October 1859 by Dr. Charles J. Fox. By April 1861 it had 150 cadets. Daniel H. Hill was made superintendent of the institute in 1859 and James H. Lane taught natural philosophy (i.e. physics) at the institute until the start of the American Civil War.

In the spring of 1861, Governor John W. Ellis ordered cadets from the school to Raleigh to serve as drill masters. The school closed during the war and the buildings were used as a Confederate hospital for part of it. Major Daniel H. Hill, who trained at West Point was superintendent of the school at the start of the American Civil War and was elected colonel of the 1st North Carolina Volunteers. Charles C. Lee was also teaching at the school at the start of the war. He became a lieutenant colonel of the 1st North Carolina Volunteers and then colonel after Hill's promotion. Lee also served as colonel of the 37th North Carolina Troops and was killed at Frayser's Farm. He is interred in Charlotte. James H. Lane, who graduated from the Virginia Military Institute, was also teaching at the North Carolina Military Institute. He was elected major and then lieutenant colonel of the 1st North Carolina Volunteers before being elected colonel of the 28th North Carolina Troops.

According to an article in the Charlotte Observer from 1889:

As at first organized, the session lasted, without intermission, throughout the year, the months of August and September being spent campaigning in the mountains of North Carolina. At the end of the second year cadets received a furlough of months.

There were a scientific and a primary department. In the former the West Point curriculum was closely followed, and the students were required to board in the buildings and to be under military discipline.

There was a primary department, which aimed to prepare students for any college. Such of these students as boarded in the buildings were likewise under military discipline.

The institute provide board, lodging, fuel, lights, washing, arms, equipment, medical attendance, uniforms and all clothing, except underclothes, for $200 per annum. No extra charges." A Charlotte Observer article from 1915 stated that the "first Confederate flag raised in the city was hoisted there when Fort Sumter fell by the students of the North Carolina Institute.

== Building ==
The cornerstone of the school building was laid in 1858. It stood at East Morehead and South Boulevard in Charlotte, North Carolina. The building served as a Confederate hospital during American Civil War. Following the war; the building was used by the Mecklenburg Female College and, from 1873 until 1882, another military school led by Colonel J. P. Thomas. After the closing of the military school in 1882, the building was used by the Charlotte public school system from 1883 until 1950. Construction of an extension of Independence Boulevard led to its demolition in 1954.

== See also ==
- List of defunct military academies in the United States
