= Lake Elsinore, California =

City in California, United States

- City
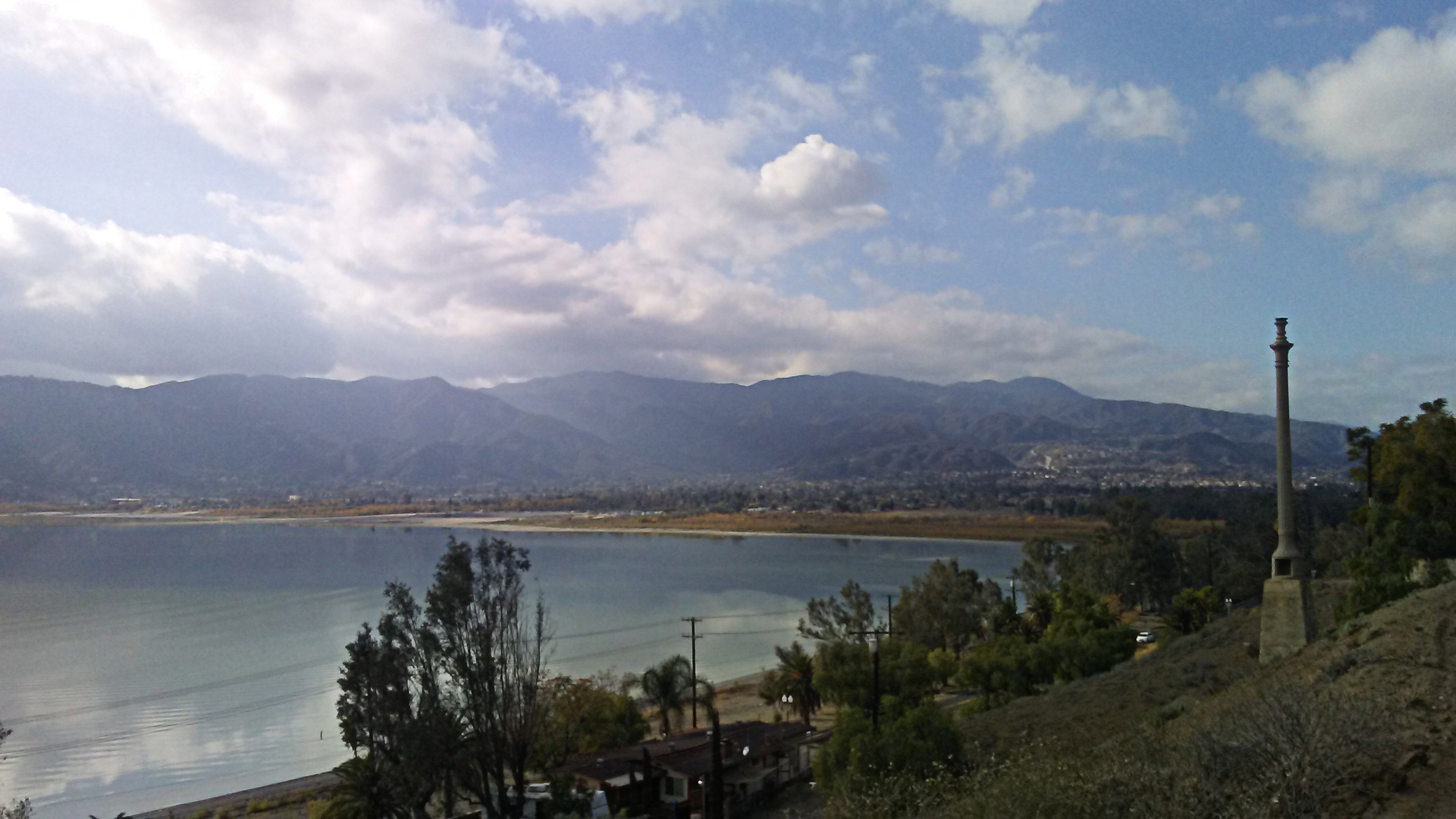
- View of Lake Elsinore

- Motto: "Dream Extreme"
- Interactive map of Lake Elsinore, California
- Location in California Lake Elsinore, California (the United States)
- Coordinates: 33°40′53″N 117°20′43″W
- Country: United States
- State: California
- County: Riverside
- Incorporated: April 8, 1888

Government
  - Type: Council-Manager
  - Mayor: Brian Tisdale
  - Mayor Pro Tem: Bob Magee
  - City Council: Timothy Sheridan; Steve Manos
  - Treasurer: Edwin Castro

Area
  - Total: 43.51 sq mi (112.70 km^{2})
  - Land: 38.24 sq mi (99.03 km^{2})
  - Water: 5.28 sq mi (13.67 km^{2}) 12.13%
- Elevation: 1,296 ft (395 m)

Population (2020)
  - Total: 70,265
  - Estimate (2024): 73,595
  - Density: 1,838/sq mi (709.5/km^{2})
- Time zone: UTC−8 (PST)
  - Summer (DST): UTC−7 (PDT)
- ZIP Codes: 92530–92532
- Area code: 951
- FIPS code: 06-39486
- GNIS feature IDs: 1652704, 2411601
- Website: www.lake-elsinore.org

Lake Elsinore is a city in the Inland Empire region of western Riverside County, California, United States. Established as a city in 1888, it is on the shore of Lake Elsinore, a natural freshwater lake about 3,000 acres (1,200 ha) in size. The city has grown from a small resort town in the late 19th and early 20th centuries to a suburban city with a population of 70,265 as of the 2020 census.

== History ==
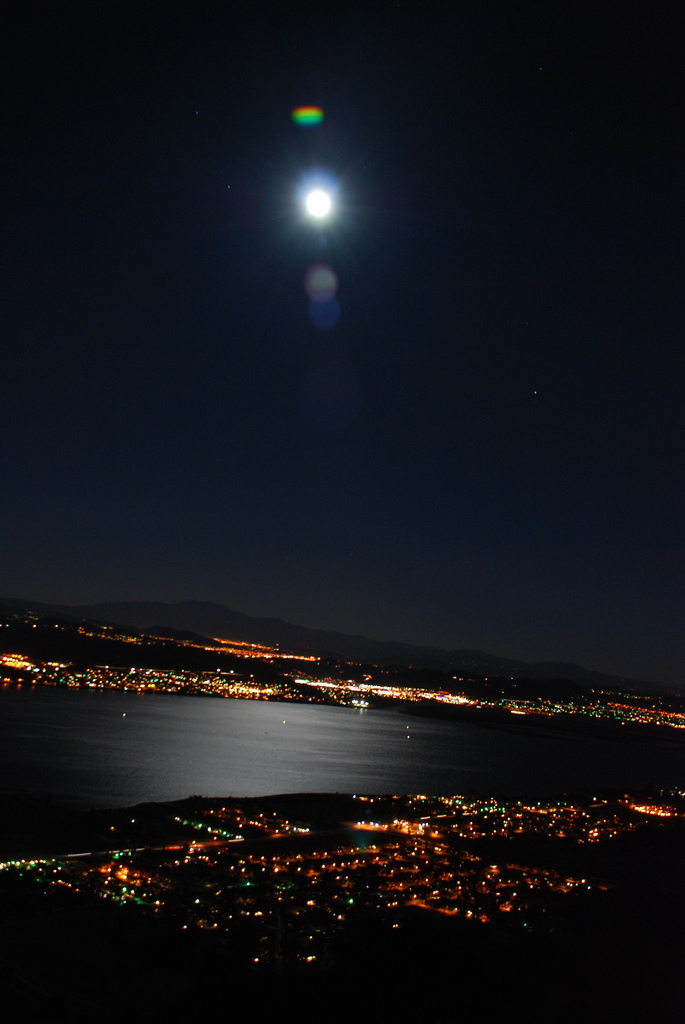
View from Santa Ana Mountains via Ortega Highway, 2009

Native Americans have long lived in the Elsinore Valley. The Luiseño people were the earliest known inhabitants. Their pictographs can be found on rocks on the Santa Ana Mountains and in Temescal Valley, and artifacts have been found all around Lake Elsinore and in the local canyons and hills.

Overlooked by the expedition of Juan Bautista de Anza, the largest natural lake in Southern California was first seen by Spanish Franciscan padre Juan Santiago, exploring eastward from the Mission San Juan Capistrano in 1797. In 1810, the water level of the Laguna Grande was first described by a traveler as being little more than a swamp about a mile long. Later in the early 19th century, the lake grew larger, providing a spot to camp and water their animals for Mexican rancheros, American trappers, the expedition of John C. Frémont, and the immigrants during the California gold rush as they traveled along the southern shore of the lake on what later became the Southern Emigrant Trail and the route of the Butterfield Overland Mail.

On January 7, 1844, Julian Manriquez acquired the land grant to Rancho La Laguna, a tract of almost 20,000 acres (8,100 ha), which included the lake and an adobe being built near the lake on its south shore at its western corner that was described by Benjamin Ignatius Hayes, who stayed there overnight on January 27, 1850.

In 1851, Abel Stearns acquired the rancho and sold it in 1858 to Augustin Machado, who built a seven-room adobe ranch house and an outbuilding on the southwest side of the lake. Soon after, Rancho La Laguna became a regular stop on the Butterfield Overland Mail route between Temecula 20 mi (32 km) to the southeast and the Temescal station 10 mi (16 km) to the northwest. The old Manriquez adobe was used as the station house. Over the years, a framed addition and a second story were added, and it was used as a post office for the small settlement of Willard from 1898 until September 30, 1902. The building stood until it was razed in 1964, at what is now 32912 Macy Street. Today, three palm trees still grow in front of the site along Macy Street in front of the property.

As a result of the Great Flood of 1862, the level of the lake was very high, so the Union Army created a post at the lake to graze and water their horses. In the great 1862–65 drought, most of the cattle in Southern California died and the lake level fell, especially during 1866 and 1867, when practically no rain fell. However, the lake was full again in 1872, when it overflowed down its outlet through Temescal Canyon.

While most of the old California families lost their ranches during the great drought, the La Laguna Rancho remained in the hands of the Machado family until 1873, when most of it was sold to Englishman Charles A. Sumner. Juan Machado retained 500 acres (200 ha) on the northwest corner of the lake, where his adobe still stands near the lake at 15410 Grand Avenue.

After 1872, the lake again evaporated to a very low level, but the great rains in the winter of 1883–84 filled it to overflowing in three weeks. Descriptions of the lake at this time say that large willow trees surrounding the former low-water shore line stood 20 ft (6.1 m) or more below the high-water level and were of such size that they must have been 30 or more years old. This indicated the high water of the 1860s and 1870s must have been of a very short duration.

On October 5, 1883, Franklin H. Heald and his partners Donald Graham and William Collier bought the remaining rancho, intending to start a new town. In 1884, the California Southern Railroad built a line from Colton through the Cañon de Rio San Jacinto (now Railroad Canyon) to link with San Diego, and a rail station La Laguna appeared near the corner of what is now Mission Trail and Diamond Drive. On April 9, 1888, Elsinore became the 73rd city to be incorporated in California, just 38 years after California became a state. Originally, Elsinore was in San Diego County, but the city became part of Riverside County upon its creation in 1893. It was named Elsinore after the Danish city, Helsingør, which is featured in William Shakespeare's play Hamlet. In fact, Helsingør is now a sister city of Lake Elsinore, California. Another source maintains Elsinore is a corruption of el señor, Spanish for "the gentleman", because the city site had been owned by a don.

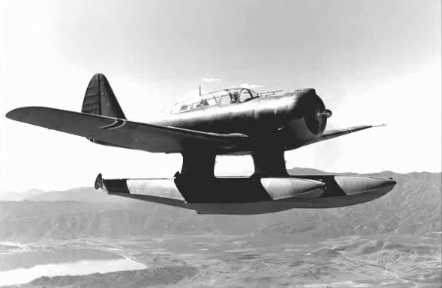
Royal Norwegian Navy Air Service Northrop N-3PB carrying out a test flight over Lake Elsinore, California, 1941

The rainfall until 1893 was greater than normal, and the lake remained high and overflowed naturally on three or four occasions during that time. The lake water was purchased by the Temescal Water Company for the irrigation of land in Corona. Its outlet channel was deepened, permitting gravity flow down the natural channel of Temescal Canyon to Corona for a year or more after the water level sank below the natural elevation of its outlet. As the lake surface continued to recede, a pumping plant was installed and pumping was continued a few seasons, but the concentration of salts in the lake, due to the evaporation and lack of rainfall, soon made the water unfit for irrigation and the project was abandoned by the company.

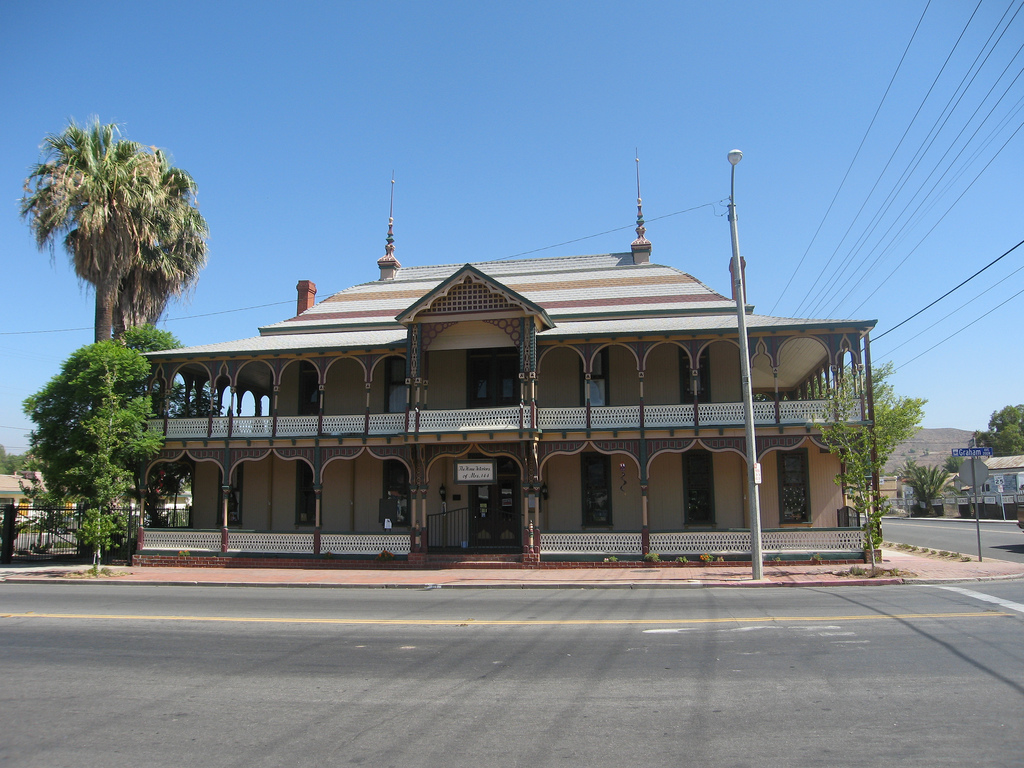
Crescent Bath House, or "The Chimes", 2006

From the beginning, the mineral springs near the lake attracted visitors seeking therapeutic treatments. In 1887, the Crescent Bath House, now known as "The Chimes", was built; it still stands in historic downtown and is a registered national historic site. By 1888, the economy was supported by coal and clay mining at what became the town of Terra Cotta, gold mining in the Pinacate Mining District, ranching, and the agriculture of fruit and nuts. After 1893, the lake's water level sank almost continuously for nearly 10 years, with a slight rise every winter. Heavier precipitation, beginning in 1903, gradually filled the lake to about half the depth above its minimum level since 1883. Then, in January 1916, a flood rapidly raised the level to overflowing.

Lake Elsinore was a popular destination in the first half of the 1900s for celebrities to escape the urban Hollywood scene. Many of their homes still stand on the hills surrounding the lake, including Aimee's Castle, a unique Moorish-style house built by Aimee Semple McPherson. Also, actor Bela Lugosi, known for his lead role in Universal Pictures' film, Dracula, built a home that still exists in the city's Country Club Heights district.

The Riverside Daily Press published this description in December 1919:

The city of Elsinore nestles snuggly on the west side of the lake, while it is backed by stately foothills through which traverses one of the famous state highways leading to Riverside and Los Angeles to the west and to San Diego to the southwest.

Its elevation of 1300 feet makes its climate delightful, especially in the cold months of winter. It has school facilities for a city twice its population, including a modern high school, grammar school and kindergarten.

It is one of few cities of its size in the state that has its own sewer system. It has an ornamental lighting system and five blocks of the city’s business section are paved from curb to curb with concrete. There are yet two and one-half miles of this kind of street to be laid on the streets entering the city from the south and west, connecting up with the inland highway system to San Diego and Riverside and Los Angeles.

Elsinore has three churches, the Methodist Episcopal, Presbyterian, Roman Catholic, while the Episcopal and Christian Scientists hold regular services in leased property.

The health record of the city is perhaps one of its greatest features. During the recent epidemic of Spanish influenza, which swept the country and the world, Elsinore escaped with but a few cases. Only three deaths were attributed to the disease.

In 1933, the Elsinore Naval and Military School was established, though it later closed in 1977.

The lake also hosted teams for Olympic training and high-speed boat racing in the 1920s. The lake went dry in the mid-1930s, but refilled by 1938.

During World War II, the lake was used to test seaplanes, and a Douglas Aircraft plant making wing assemblies for Boeing B-17 Flying Fortress bombers was located in the city. The lake ran dry during most of the 1950s and was refilled in the early 1960s.

Despite its relatively small African American population, it has the distinction of electing the first black city councilman in California, Thomas R. Yarborough, in 1948. Yarborough went on to become one of three African American mayors elected in California in 1966.

In 1972, citizens of the city voted to rename it Lake Elsinore. More than a week of heavy rains in 1980 flooded the lake, destroying surrounding homes and businesses. Since then, a multimillion-dollar project has been put into place to maintain the water supply at a consistent level, allowing for homes to be built close to the lake. Overflow water in the lake spills out via Alberhill Creek, a tributary of Temescal Creek. In 2007, an aeration system was added to help the lake's ecosystem.

The city was ranked as the 12th-fastest-growing city in California between 2000 and 2008. Now, over 70,000 residents as of the 2020 census live there, and formerly open hillsides have been converted into housing tracts.

== Geography ==
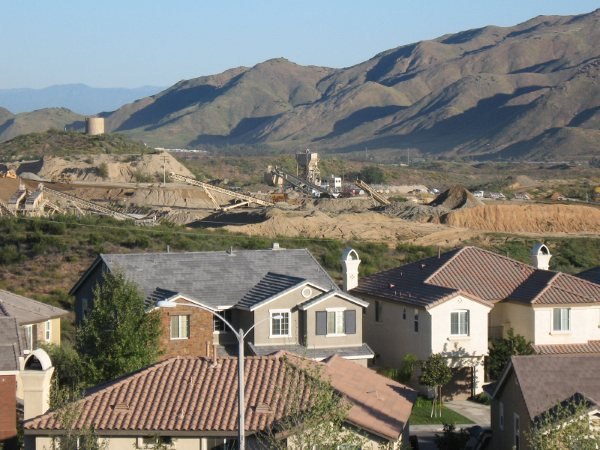
Newly constructed housing tract in the Alberhill Ranch neighborhood. Pacific Clay Products company mine in background.

According to the United States Census Bureau, the city has a total area of 43.5 sq mi (112.7 km^{2}) of which 5.3 sq mi (13.7 km^{2}), or 12.13%, are covered by water.

Lake Elsinore, originally Laguna Grande, is the largest natural freshwater lake in Southern California and is situated at the lowest point within the 750-square-mile (1,900 km^{2}) San Jacinto River watershed at the terminus of the San Jacinto River, where its headwaters are found on the western slopes of San Jacinto Peak with its North Fork, and Lake Hemet with its South Fork. Lake levels are healthy at 1,244 feet (379 m) above sea level with a volume of 30,000 acre⋅ft (37 Gl) that often fluctuate, although much has been done recently to prevent the lake from drying up, flooding, or becoming stagnant. At 1,255 feet (383 m), the lake would spill into the outflow channel on its northeastern shore, known properly as Temescal Wash, flowing northwest along I-15, which feeds Temescal Creek, which dumps into the Santa Ana River just northwest of the City of Corona. It then flows to Orange County, out to the Pacific Ocean just south of Huntington State Beach.

Lake Elsinore is bordered by the Elsinore Mountains to the west, which are a part of the larger Santa Ana Mountain Range, and receive a few inches of snowfall a few days each year. Included in the Santa Ana Mountains are the Cleveland National Forest and the community of El Cariso. Lake Elsinore is northwest of Wildomar and the northern portion is part of the Temescal Canyon. To the east of the lake are the much older and more eroded slopes of the Temescal Mountains.

=== Districts ===
Lake Elsinore encompasses a large geographical area. To better distinguish the wide range of neighborhoods, the city is organized into 11 districts; They are the Alberhill, Ballpark, Business, Country Club Heights, East Lake, Historic, Lake Edge, Lake Elsinore Hills, Lake View, North Peak, and Riverview Districts.

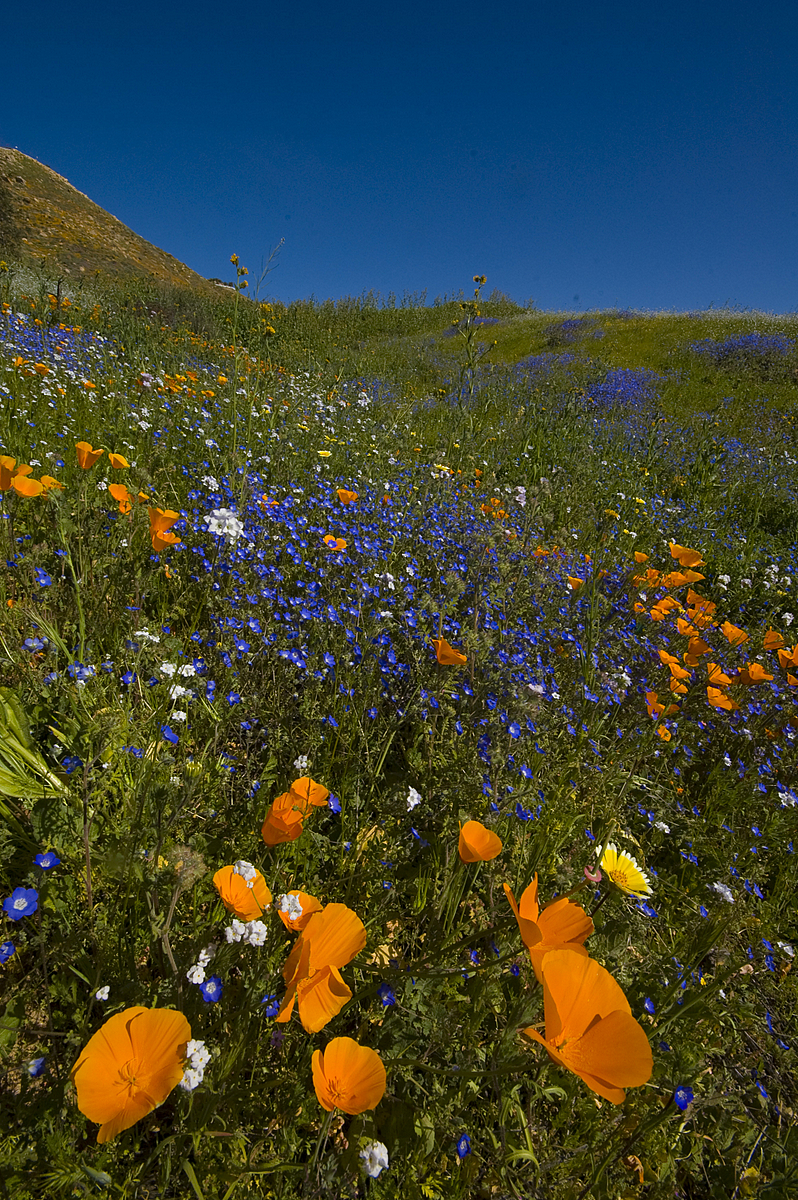
Wildflowers and California poppies in the Alberhill District

==== Alberhill ====
The Alberhill District is characterized by rolling terrain, vacant land, and the newly constructed Alberhill Ranch neighborhood. Much of the topography in the central areas, east and west of Lake Street, has been substantially altered as a result of the Alberhill District's long history of extractive/mining activities. Mining operations in the Alberhill District began at Terra Cotta roughly the same time the region's first railroad, the California Southern Railroad, was completed in the 1880s. A spur of the railroad originally built to Terra Cotta was extended into the central portion of the Alberhill District. The Atchison, Topeka, and Santa Fe Railroad built a line up from Corona through Alberhill to Elsinore after the line through Railroad Canyon was washed out in the 1920s. These events helped shape the growth of the District. Mining operations for coal and especially clay have continued to exist since the late 19th century, and occupy a significant portion of the Alberhill District. Through the years, Pacific Clay Products Company has purchased the local mines and has become the sole operating clay mine in the region.

==== Ballpark ====
The Ballpark District takes its name from the Lake Elsinore Diamond Stadium, a first-class minor league baseball stadium constructed in 1994. It is home to the Lake Elsinore Storm professional baseball team, an affiliate of the San Diego Padres. The area was once the site of the first train depot in Lake Elsinore, but no train tracks or structures from that era remain.

==== Business ====
The developed area within the Business District, in Warm Springs Valley, is relatively new and has the strongest concentration of industrial and commercial uses within the city. In addition, it hosts several big-box retailers, the Lake Elsinore Outlets, the lake's outlet channel, Temescal Creek, and marshlands. It is bordered by Country Club Heights to the west and Interstate 15 to the east, with a small portion extending to the east side of I-15. Sections of the Atchison, Topeka, & Santa Fe Railroads that passed through the Business District during the 1800s have been removed. In addition, a historic ranching and homesteading site with previous ranching and homesteading activities is located nearby the route where the railroad once existed.

==== Country Club Heights ====
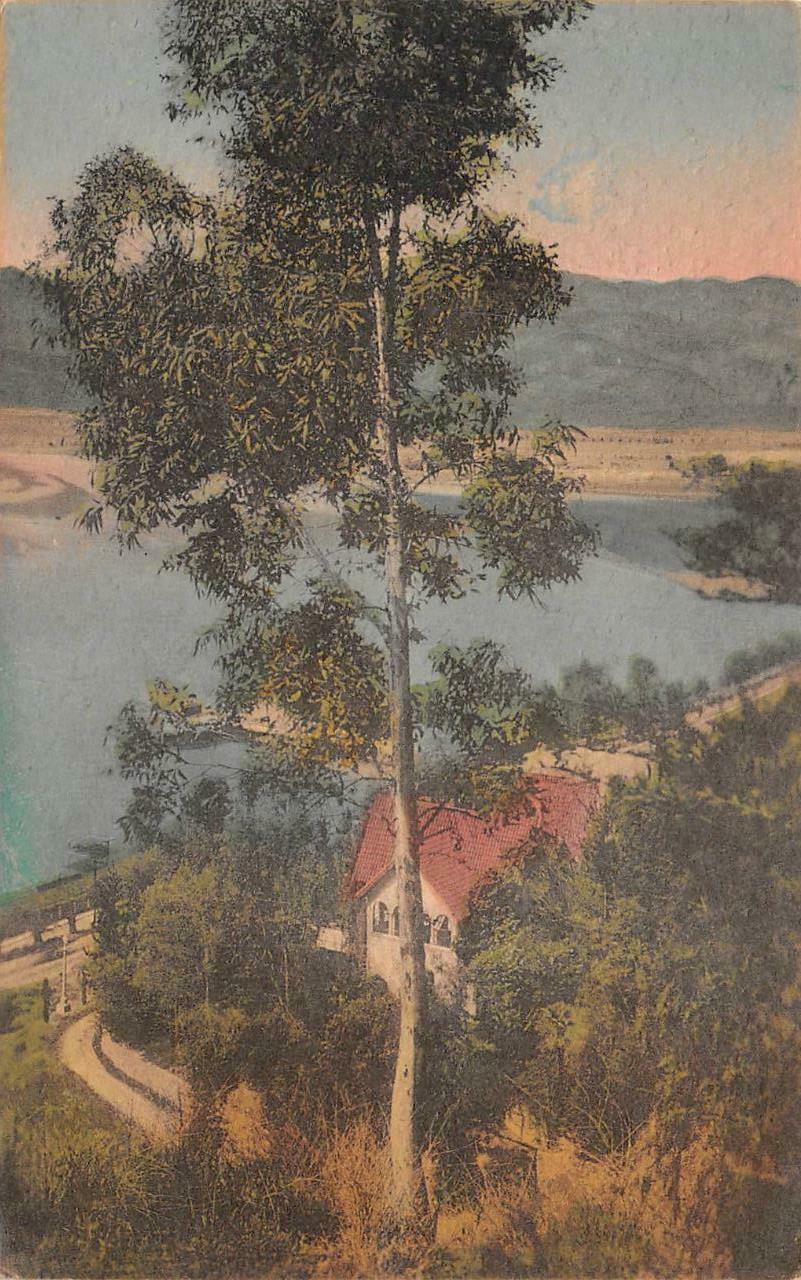

The Country Club Heights District is distinctly marked by the steep hillsides of the Clevelin Hills, views of the lake and the city, and is a key part of Lake Elsinore's history. The issues mentioned above have presented development constraints for Country Club Heights since its historic beginnings dating back to 1912. The area was the target of an elaborate land scheme promoted in Los Angeles. The Mutual Benefit and Loan Society of Los Angeles acquired two pieces of dry, "hill-land" within a few miles north of "town-land" that the Press claimed was not worth ten cents an acre. The Mutual Benefit and Loan Society offered to give a 25-by-100-foot (7.6 m × 30.5 m) lot to anyone who asked; however, the person receiving the lot had to pay ten dollars for a membership in the club, and one dollar per month dues for five years. In 1924, the Clevelin Realty Corporation, headed by Abe Corlin (President) and Henry Schultz (Treasurer-Secretary), began selling additional lots in Country Club Heights and launched a real estate sales promotion in the area. The Clevelin Hills took their name from this company.

Noteworthy sites in the Country Club Heights District include: the Schultz Mansion (now Bredlau Castle) and the Corlin Mansion, both built by the Corporation on the Clevelin Hills in 1926 for Henry Schultz and Abe Corlin, respectively, who had originated the Clevelin Realty development. The Bredlau castle is over 9,000 sq ft (840 m^{2}), and includes a hidden room with a sliding bookcase door that was used during Prohibition. These stately homes overlooking the lake were the site for many social gatherings. The winding roads of Country Club Heights are adorned with historic Marbelite lampposts, designed by Henry Barkschat. In 2007, the City of Lake Elsinore restored the historic lampposts along Lakeshore Drive.

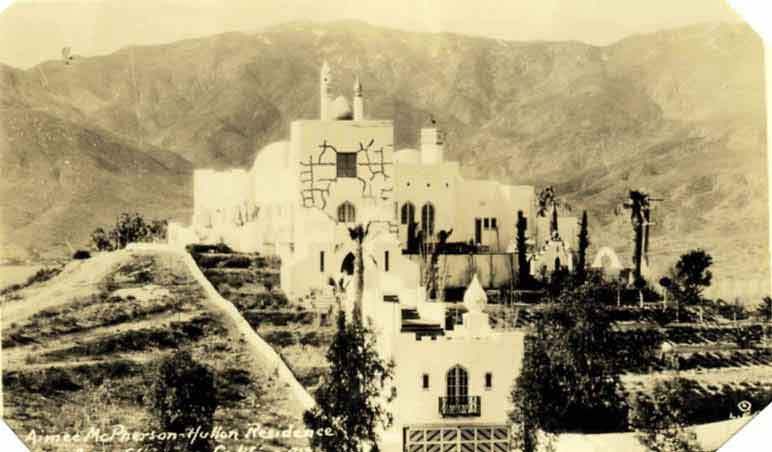
Aimee's Castle

In October 1928, Aimee Semple McPherson, a renowned evangelist, commissioned Architect Edwin Dickman to design for her a palatial home in Country Club Heights, which has since won fame as "Aimee's Castle". This is said to be a house born of Hollywood, inspired by Moorish architectural design. This home served as the evangelist's part-time home until 1939, when it passed to new ownership. After changing hands many times, in 2005, International Church of the Foursquare Gospel, the modern incarnation of McPherson's Foursquare Gospel, purchased and restored the property after years of neglect.

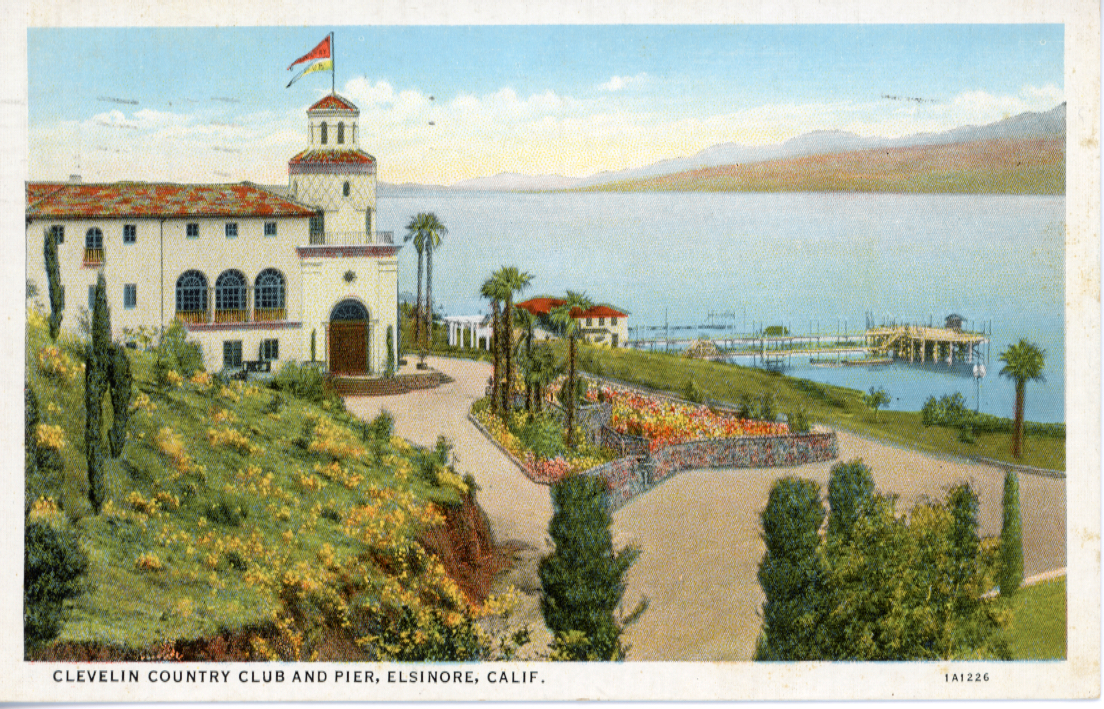

The Clevelin Country Club (later known as the Lake Elsinore Country Club, The Spa Club and the Casino Del Elsinore) was built to be the main attraction of the Country Club Heights subdivision. Prominent members of the club included Mrs. Wallace Reid, Marie Prevost, Reginald Denny, Jack Dempsey, Bert Lytell, Damon Runyon and Joe Stecher, for whom the streets were named. This Spanish-Mediterranean Moorish accented architectural masterpiece had over 20,000 square feet of floor space and included a ballroom, banquet hall, sleeping quarters, and a tunnel system to hidden rooms. The Country Club closed during the depression, but reopened in 1951. It has closed again before 1981, at which point restoration work was being undertaken, but by 1990 the property was vacant and derelict. The Country Club succumbed to arson in 2001.

==== East Lake ====
The East Lake District is partially developed and contains the newly constructed Summerly neighborhood. It is a generally flat area that does not contain any registered historic structures. However, portions of the East Lake District were used during prehistoric times by Native American Indians as flaking and grinding stations. In addition, a historic ranching and homesteading site is located just outside the East Lake District along the border with Lakeland Village to the southwest. More recently, the East Lake District has also been home to popular motocross, skydiving, glider plane, and hang gliding activities. Throughout the city's history, Lake Elsinore has alternated between severe floods and droughts. Most of the East Lake District lies within a 100-year floodplain adjacent to and southeast of the lake. As a result, the district has been significantly affected during wet seasons and high water levels in the lake. Major floods occurred in 1884 and in 1916. In 1969, 7 in (180 mm) of rain fell in 11 days and severely flooded the lake's shores. The East Lake District's proximity to the lake and flood storage is a key consideration in all planned development and several projects have been implemented to prevent the lake from flooding again.

==== Historic District ====
The Historic District has been the focal point of the city since its incorporation in 1888.

In 1925, W.R. Covington and Associates of Santa Monica purchased 650 ft (200 m) of lake frontage and three blocks of slightly improved land across Poe Street from Warm Springs Park. A clubhouse, swimming pool, and other facilities projected to cost $200,000 (or $3.7 million today) were built on this property. No records have been found to provide the date when a fire destroyed the clubhouse, but remnants of the burned structure and surrounding trees examined in 1942 indicate the fire must have occurred soon after the building was constructed. The Covington resort was built in the Town of Elsinore.

Today, several unregistered historic buildings exist, including the Crescent Bath House, also known as "The Chimes"; The Chamber of Commerce (Santa Fe Train Station); The Cultural Center (The Methodist Church); Armory Hall; The Ambassador Hotel (Elsinore Consolidated Bank); Jean Hayman House; and Elsinore City Park The neighborhoods in this area are the oldest in the city, and its commercial strip along Main Street is considered to be downtown.

==== Lake Edge District ====
The Lake Edge District area has had a long and eventful history, with the lake as a focal point for the Native Americans, Europeans, Mexicans, early founders of the city, and the multitude of visitors and locals who continue to come to its shores for entertainment and recreation. Many developments occurred along or within proximity of the lake's edge during the second half of the 19th and the first half of the 20th centuries.

The Lake Edge District encompasses the ruins of the city's oldest standing structure, the Machado Adobe House, Rancho La Laguna This site was the location of the Laguna Grande Butterfield Stage Station. This structure succumbed to arson in 2017.

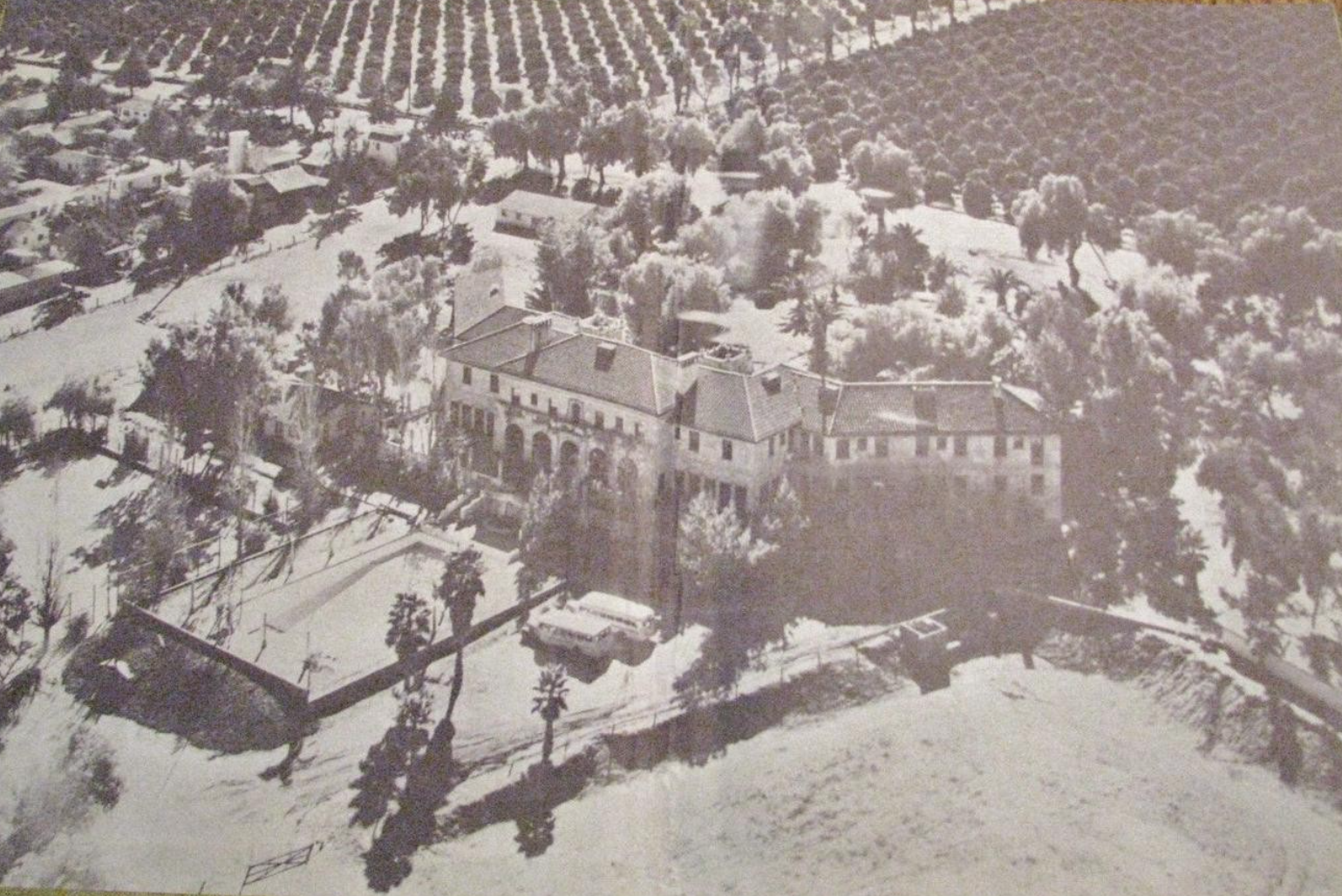
Elsinore Naval and Military School from 1955 yearbook

A structure of historical interest is Meyer & Holler designed Southern California Athletic and Country Club, former Elsinore Naval and Military School building, located along Grand Avenue near the intersection of Ortega Highway.

A newly constructed campground, marina, and boat launch is located on the northwest side of the lake.

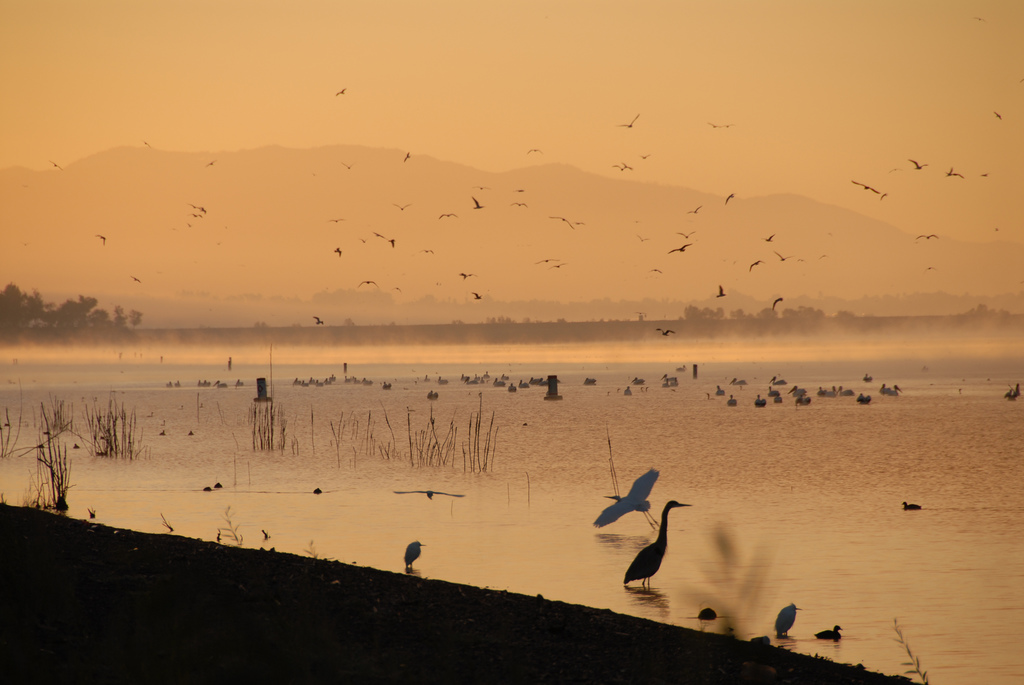
Birds on Lake Elsinore, 2007

==== Lake Elsinore Hills ====
The Lake Elsinore Hills District encompasses a large and varied terrain including broad plains, rolling hills, steep slopes, sensitive habitats, and watercourses, with elevations ranging from 1,300 to 2,170 feet (400 to 660 m) above the sea level. Many areas of the Lake Elsinore Hills District are not readily accessible or able to be developed, so have remained vacant. Two large bodies of water located within close proximity of the Lake Elsinore Hills District are the city's lake to the southwest and Canyon Lake to the east, which is located within the city of Canyon Lake. Some of the higher elevations offer panoramic views of the city's lake and the Santa Ana Mountains. The neighborhoods in this district include Tuscany Hills, Canyon Hills, and Rosetta Canyon.

==== Lake View ====
The northwestern areas of the Lake View District offer beautiful views of the lake and the neighboring mountains, and are characterized by high elevations, steep slopes, and a series of canyons. The remaining areas of the Lake View District are relatively flat in the lower elevations. Historically, the northern portion of the Lake View District has remained mostly undeveloped, with the exception of the La Laguna Estates neighborhood above McVicker Canyon Park. Similar to the areas further north, the Atchison, Topeka, and Santa Fe Railroad and abundant mining opportunities extant in the late 19th century brought both residents and visitors to the area. Historic ranching and homesteading, including Torn Ranch, were generally located to the northwest of Machado Street, which was an important roadway lined with beautiful deodar trees. Most of the lower-lying areas of the Lake View District to the north have been recently developed and primarily include single-family homes. Other neighborhoods in this area include Northshore and Lake Terrace, which were both formerly orange groves. Another area in this district at the intersection of Riverside and Lakeshore Drives has long been to referred to as "Four Corners" by local residents.

==== Riverview ====
The Riverview District is a combination of steep terrain and flat areas nestled between a knoll with steep slopes, a major watercourse, and the lake. Higher elevations and steep slopes are located in the northwest areas of the Riverview District, which function as a physical border with most of the adjacent Historic District. The San Jacinto River floodway, located within the Riverview District along the eastern and southern areas, is the city's major watercourse. The river flows southwest from Canyon Lake through the Lake Elsinore Hills District and the Riverview District, then ultimately empties into the lake.

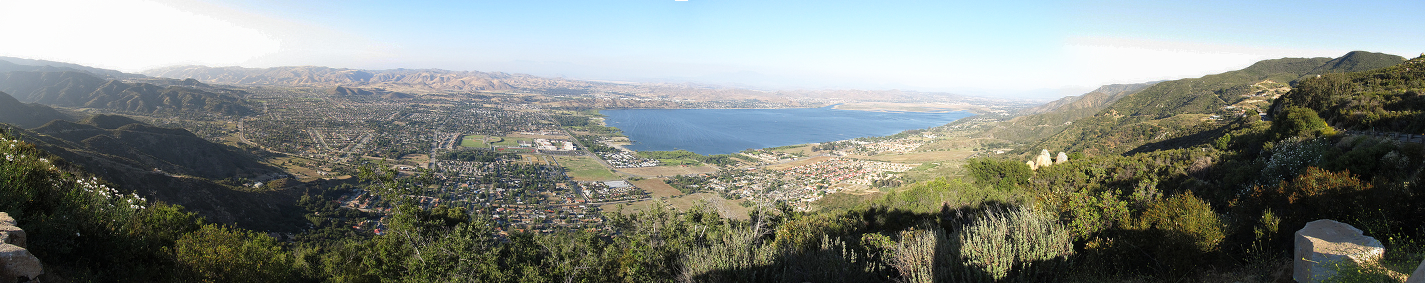
View of Lake Elsinore from the Santa Ana Mountains looking east

=== Climate ===
Lake Elsinore has a mild semi-arid climate (Köppen climate classification BSk/BSh), with hot, almost rainless summers and mild, wetter winters. While too dry for this classification, its thermal regime and precipitation distribution resembles that of a hot-summer Mediterranean climate (Köppen Csa), which is present in many surrounding areas. On average, the hottest month is July, and the coolest month is December. The highest recorded temperature was 118 °F (47.8 °C), first recorded on August 12, 1933, and the lowest recorded temperature was 10 °F (−12.2 °C) on December 30, 1974. The maximum average precipitation occurs in January with 75 millimetres (3.0 inches), and the minimum average precipitation in June with 1.8 millimetres (0.071 inches), although less than half of all Junes, Julies, Augusts, and Septembers record any precipitation whatsoever. The greatest amount of precipitation ever received in one day was 5.28 inches (134 mm), on February 15, 1927. Snowfall only occurs in April with 0.51 centimetres (0.20 inches).

Climate data for Lake Elsinore, California (1991–2020 normals, extremes 1897–present)
Month	Jan	Feb	Mar	Apr	May	Jun	Jul	Aug	Sep	Oct	Nov	Dec	Year
Record high °F (°C)	91 (33)	95 (35)	103 (39)	109 (43)	109 (43)	114 (46)	117 (47)	118 (48)	117 (47)	110 (43)	98 (37)	90 (32)	118 (48)
Mean maximum °F (°C)	78.4 (25.8)	82.2 (27.9)	87.5 (30.8)	93.8 (34.3)	98.5 (36.9)	103.9 (39.9)	107.8 (42.1)	108.3 (42.4)	105.3 (40.7)	98.5 (36.9)	88.4 (31.3)	78.8 (26.0)	110.9 (43.8)
Mean daily maximum °F (°C)	65.7 (18.7)	67.1 (19.5)	71.5 (21.9)	76.5 (24.7)	82.0 (27.8)	90.2 (32.3)	96.5 (35.8)	97.8 (36.6)	93.2 (34.0)	83.1 (28.4)	73.2 (22.9)	65.0 (18.3)	80.2 (26.8)
Daily mean °F (°C)	53.8 (12.1)	54.9 (12.7)	58.7 (14.8)	62.6 (17.0)	67.9 (19.9)	74.3 (23.5)	80.3 (26.8)	81.3 (27.4)	77.2 (25.1)	68.5 (20.3)	59.6 (15.3)	52.6 (11.4)	66.0 (18.9)
Mean daily minimum °F (°C)	41.9 (5.5)	42.7 (5.9)	45.8 (7.7)	48.7 (9.3)	53.8 (12.1)	58.3 (14.6)	64.1 (17.8)	64.8 (18.2)	61.2 (16.2)	53.9 (12.2)	45.9 (7.7)	40.3 (4.6)	51.8 (11.0)
Mean minimum °F (°C)	31.0 (−0.6)	32.8 (0.4)	35.3 (1.8)	38.8 (3.8)	44.8 (7.1)	50.3 (10.2)	54.8 (12.7)	56.2 (13.4)	51.8 (11.0)	44.4 (6.9)	35.7 (2.1)	29.9 (−1.2)	27.8 (−2.3)
Record low °F (°C)	15 (−9)	19 (−7)	24 (−4)	24 (−4)	31 (−1)	35 (2)	41 (5)	40 (4)	35 (2)	25 (−4)	20 (−7)	17 (−8)	15 (−9)
Average precipitation inches (mm)	2.97 (75)	2.85 (72)	1.49 (38)	0.54 (14)	0.21 (5.3)	0.07 (1.8)	0.18 (4.6)	0.06 (1.5)	0.17 (4.3)	0.51 (13)	0.59 (15)	2.01 (51)	11.65 (296)
Average snowfall inches (cm)	0.0 (0.0)	0.0 (0.0)	0.0 (0.0)	0.2 (0.51)	0.0 (0.0)	0.0 (0.0)	0.0 (0.0)	0.0 (0.0)	0.0 (0.0)	0.0 (0.0)	0.0 (0.0)	0.0 (0.0)	0.2 (0.51)
Average precipitation days (≥ 0.01 in)	5.6	5.8	4.7	2.5	1.4	0.1	0.6	0.5	0.6	2.0	2.8	5.3	31.9
Average snowy days	0.0	0.1	0.0	0.0	0.0	0.0	0.0	0.0	0.0	0.0	0.0	0.0	0.1
Source 1: NOAA
Source 2: National Weather Service

== Demographics ==
Historical population
Census	Pop.	Note	%±
1900	279		—
1910	488		74.9%
1920	633		29.7%
1930	1,350		113.3%
1940	1,552		15.0%
1950	2,068		33.2%
1960	2,432		17.6%
1970	3,530		45.1%
1980	5,982		69.5%
1990	18,285		205.7%
2000	28,928		58.2%
2010	51,821		79.1%
2020	70,265		35.6%
2024 (est.)	73,595	▲	4.7%
U.S. Decennial Census

=== Racial and ethnic composition ===
Demographic profile	2020	2010	2000	1990	1980
White	39.5%	60.0%	65.6%	76.9%	80.4%
—Non-Hispanic (NH)	30.2%	37.8%	51.4%	67.7%	72.4%
Black or African American (NH)	6.4%	4.8%	5.0%	3.8%	8.1%
Hispanic or Latino (of any race)	51.0%	48.4%	38.0%	25.8%	18.0%
Asian (NH)	7.0%	5.6%	2.0%	1.7%	-
American Indian (NH)	0.4%	0.4%	0.7%	0.9%	-
Other (NH)	5.0%	3.0%	2.9%	0.1%	1.6%

=== 2020 census ===
As of the 2020 census, Lake Elsinore had a population of 70,265, with a population density of 1,837.6 inhabitants per square mile (709.5/km^{2}). The racial makeup was 39.5% White, 6.8% African American, 1.5% Native American, 7.4% Asian, 0.5% Pacific Islander, 25.3% from other races, and 18.9% from two or more races; Hispanic or Latino residents of any race were 51.0% of the population.

The census reported that 99.9% of the population lived in households, 94 people (0.1%) lived in non-institutionalized group quarters, and no one was institutionalized. 98.1% of residents lived in urban areas, while 1.9% lived in rural areas.

There were 20,426 households, of which 47.8% had children under the age of 18 living in them. Of all households, 56.5% were married-couple households, 7.5% were cohabiting couple households, 20.5% had a female householder with no spouse or partner present, and 15.5% had a male householder with no spouse or partner present. About 14.3% of all households were made up of individuals, and 4.6% had someone living alone who was 65 years of age or older. The average household size was 3.44, and there were 16,447 families (80.5% of all households).

The age distribution was 28.5% under the age of 18, 9.8% aged 18 to 24, 28.8% aged 25 to 44, 23.6% aged 45 to 64, and 9.3% who were 65 years of age or older. The median age was 33.3 years. For every 100 females, there were 97.8 males, and for every 100 females age 18 and over, there were 95.6 males age 18 and over.

There were 21,125 housing units at an average density of 552.5 units per square mile (213.3 units/km^{2}), of which 20,426 (96.7%) were occupied. Of these, 68.1% were owner-occupied and 31.9% were occupied by renters. The homeowner vacancy rate was 1.0%, and the rental vacancy rate was 4.3%.

=== 2023 ACS 5-year estimates ===
In 2023, the US Census Bureau estimated that 21.0% of the population was foreign-born. Of all residents aged five years or older, 57.9% spoke only English at home, 35.6% spoke Spanish, 1.9% spoke other Indo-European languages, 4.2% spoke Asian or Pacific Islander languages, and 0.5% spoke other languages. Of those aged 25 or older, 82.9% were high school graduates and 23.0% had a bachelor's degree.

The median household income in 2023 was $96,527, and the per capita income was $34,572. About 7.4% of families and 9.4% of the population were below the poverty line.

== Economy ==
One of the first outlet centers in California was established in northwestern Lake Elsinore in the late 1990s on Collier Avenue at Nichols Road, just off Interstate 15. The center, known as the Outlets at Lake Elsinore, has a wide variety of retailers, encompassing clothing and shoe stores, eateries, bookstores, perfumeries, home and garden boutiques, and electronics stores.

Pacific Clay is among the companies based in Lake Elsinore.

=== Top employers ===
According to the city's 2024 Comprehensive Annual Financial Report, the top employers in the city are:

#	Employer	No. of employees
1	Lake Elsinore Unified School District	2,688
2	M & M Framing	512
3	Stater Bros. Markets	346
4	Costco	323
5	Walmart	290
6	Lake Elsinore Hotel & Casino	246
7	Riverside County Department of Social Services	217
8	Elsinore Valley Municipal Water District (EVMWD)	180
9	City of Lake Elsinore	163
10	The Home Depot	156

== Government ==
In the California State Legislature, Lake Elsinore is in the 32nd senatorial district, represented by Republican Kelly Seyarto, and in the 63rd Assembly district, represented by Republican Natasha Johnson.

In the United States House of Representatives, Lake Elsinore is in California's 41st congressional district, represented by Republican Ken Calvert.

== Services ==
=== Public safety ===
The Riverside County Sheriff's Department serves the entire Lake Elsinore Valley (including the nearby community of Lakeland Village and the City of Wildomar) from its regional station in downtown Lake Elsinore. The city once had its own police department, but it was disbanded in 1970 for budgetary reasons.

The city of Lake Elsinore contracts for fire and paramedic services with the Riverside County Fire Department through a cooperative agreement with CAL FIRE. Lake Elsinore currently has three paramedic engines and one paramedic truck company operating from its four stations.

Fire Station 10 is located downtown next to the post office, which also has two CAL FIRE engines for supplemental protection. Fire Station 85 is located at McVicker Park and Fire Station 94 is located on the east side of the city off of Railroad Canyon Road. Rosetta Canyon Fire Station 97 is located on the northeast side of the city covering the Highway 74 corridor.

=== Education ===
Public education within most of the city of Lake Elsinore and the surrounding areas is provided by the Lake Elsinore Unified School District, which serves a student population of about 21,500. The school district has 15 elementary schools, five middle schools, three high schools, and three alternative schools.

Lakeside, Temescal Canyon, and Elsinore are the three main high schools of the Lake Elsinore Unified School District.

A very small portion of northeastern Lake Elsinore in the Canyon Hills subdivision is located in the Menifee Union School District for grades K-8, and Perris Union High School District for grades 9–12. Another portion of Lake Elsinore is in the Perris Elementary School District and the Perris UHSD for grades 7–12.

Additionally, three private schools are within the city of Lake Elsinore, including a K–12 preparatory academy.

=== Libraries and post office ===
There are two libraries located in the city: the Lake Elsinore Library at 600 W. Graham Avenue and the Lakeside Library at 32593 Riverside Drive. Both library branches are owned and operated by the Riverside County Library System.

The United States Postal Service operates a post office at 500 W. Graham Avenue in Lake Elsinore.

=== Cemetery ===
The Elsinore Valley Cemetery District maintains a public cemetery in the city. The cemetery was established in 1891 by Peter Wall. The Jewish Home of Peace Cemetery, a.k.a. Mt. Sinai Memorial Park of Elsinore, is part of the cemetery.

The Manker Family Cemetery is an historical cemetery located on the family property. Three known burials are from 1887 to 1902, with evidence of at least one other burial. The four wooden tombstones were burned in a fire.

== Transportation ==
=== Roads and highways ===
Lake Elsinore is served by Interstate 15, which connects the city to points south such as Temecula and San Diego, and to points north such as Corona, Ontario and Las Vegas. Construction is expected to begin around 2025 on a set of toll lanes in the median of Interstate 15 that would extend south from Corona to the northern part of Lake Elsinore. Lake Elsinore is also served by State Route 74, which connects the city with Orange County to the west as well as points east including Perris, the San Jacinto Valley, and the Coachella Valley. Long-range plans include redirecting State Route 74 onto a newer, more direct expressway alignment known as the Ethanac Expressway.

In addition to highways, many of Lake Elsinore's primary streets connect the city with other cities nearby. Grand Avenue and Mission Trail both connect Lake Elsinore with the neighboring city of Wildomar, and to the east Railroad Canyon Road connects Lake Elsinore with the cities of Canyon Lake and Menifee. Temescal Canyon Road continues from the northwestern part of the city and passes through the unincorporated community of Temescal Valley before reaching the city of Corona.

=== Public transportation ===
Riverside Transit Agency has several local and express bus routes serving the city of Lake Elsinore, including Routes 8, 9, 40, 205, and 206.

== Sports ==
=== Lake Elsinore Diamond ===
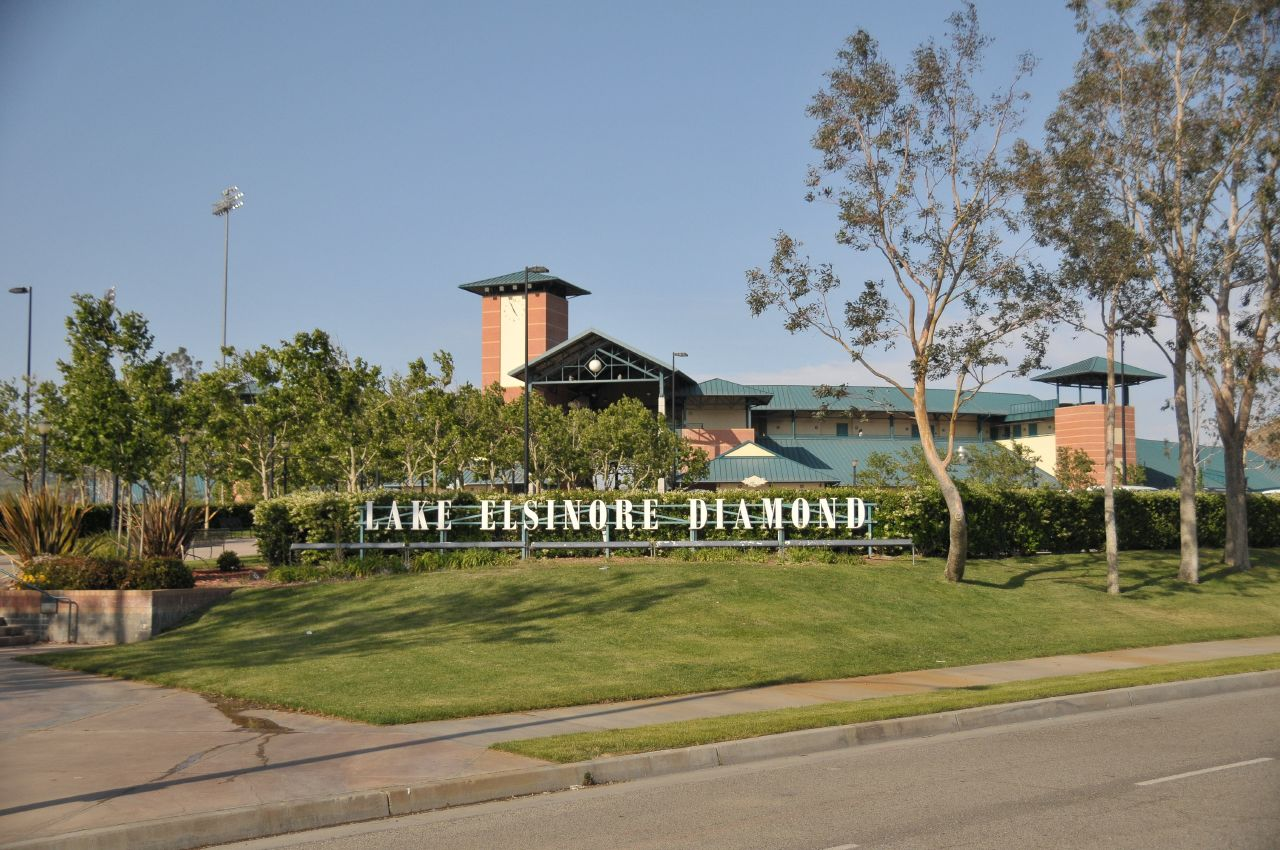
Lake Elsinore Diamond, 2008

Lake Elsinore Diamond serves as a site for the Single A baseball team Lake Elsinore Storm, which is a farm team for the San Diego Padres, and was formerly a farm team for the Los Angeles Angels of Anaheim. Also, it held now-disbanded semipro football teams: The Riverside-Elsinore Dolphins of the Western States Football League was active in 1996–98. The stadium hosted the Banning-Elsinore Eagles of the California Football Association, a minor American football league. It used to host the Elsinore-Murrieta Bandits, a semipro soccer team in the 2010s. In 2020, neither football or soccer is played at "the Diamond", but special events, such as concerts with stars such as Willie Nelson and ZZ Top, are held there.

==== Cross monument lawsuit ====
In 2012, the city council voted to approve $50,000 for a memorial to veterans that would be placed in front of the stadium. The design of the memorial included a soldier kneeling in front of a Christian cross. After repeated warnings to the city council from the city attorney and others that endorsing religion using public funds is unconstitutional, the city council unanimously voted to include a Star of David, as well as more Christian crosses. In 2013, the American Humanist Association filed suit to prevent the building of the monument. The Pacific Justice Institute provided free legal representation to the city in the suit. A federal court issued a preliminary injunction in July 2013 halting the project, and in February 2014 ruled that the design "violates both the U.S. Constitution's Establishment Clause and the Establishment and No Preference Clauses of the California Constitution." The City Council declined to appeal the decision, and agreed to pay plaintiffs $200,000 in attorneys' fees and to develop a revised design for the memorial. At a meeting in June 2014, the council approved an amended design. The 3,600-pound (1,600 kg) memorial, absent of religious symbols, was finally installed and commemorated in November 2014.

=== Elsinore Grand Prix ===
The Elsinore Grand Prix is a dirt-bike race that takes place in and around the Lake Elsinore area. The annual race is usually held in mid-November. The popularity of the event hit its apex in the late 1960s and early 1970s, drawing the likes of dirt-bike greats such as Malcolm Smith and Steve McQueen, to name a few. The race has always been set as an "open" format, meaning anyone can ride; usually only about 200 or so take this event seriously, whereas the rest use it as an opportunity to have fun. In 1971, the documentary movie On Any Sunday by Bruce Brown included scenes from the grand prix.

In the mid-1970s the Elsinore Grand Prix hit a snag, none of the big riders were participating, and the event was drawing the wrong crowd, mostly violent motorcycle gangs. The race was cancelled indefinitely soon afterwards. In 1996, several dirt-bike riders, with a hint of nostalgia, decided to lobby the city of Lake Elsinore to revive the Grand Prix. Promising that the violent motorcycle gang crowd drawn to the Grand Prix in the 1970s had gone and that dirt-bike motorcycle riding was more of a family event, the city allowed the event to resume on a provisional basis.

In 1973, Honda named its CR250M Elsinore—the first motorcycle designed by Honda for the dirt rather than a modified street bike—after the Elsinore GP race venue.

Lake Elsinore is also a popular destination for motorcyclists riding east from San Juan Capistrano along the 33-mile (53 km) long Ortega Highway.

=== Skateparks ===
Lake Elsinore offers two skateparks in both north and south of the areas. McVicker Canyon Park was the first city-owned skatepark to be built in Lake Elsinore located between Grand Avenue and McVicker Canyon Park Road. Serenity Park was built in June 2015 and is located on Palomar Road. The city hired Spohn Ranch Skateparks, an internationally renowned firm in Los Angeles, for about $400,000 to design and build the state-of-the-art 8,500-square-foot, open-air plaza that features a peanut-shaped bowl, hip ramps, step-up and quarter-pipes. It is the second city-owned skatepark.

== See also ==
- Lake Elsinore Advanced Pumped Storage
