= Robert Latane Montague =

American politician

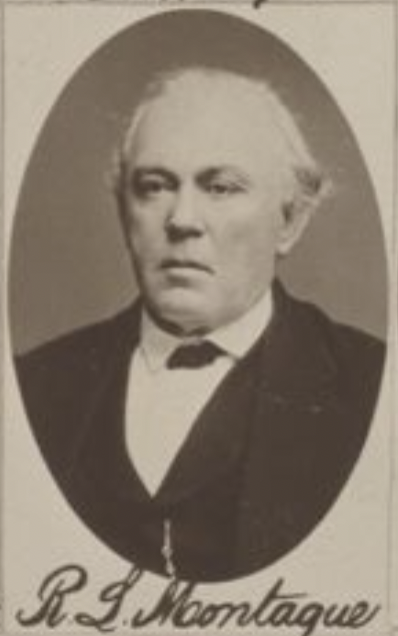

Member of the Confederate States House of Representatives from Virginia's 1st district
- In office February 18, 1864 – May 10, 1865
- Preceded by: Muscoe R. H. Garnett
- Succeeded by: None (position eliminated)

4th Lieutenant Governor of Virginia
- In office January 1, 1860 – January 1, 1864
- Governor: John Letcher
- Preceded by: William L. Jackson, Jr.
- Succeeded by: Samuel Price

Member of the Virginia House of Delegates from the Middlesex County district
- In office January 1, 1874 – March 31, 1875
- Preceded by: Lemuel C. Bristow
- Succeeded by: Lemuel C. Bristow

Member of the Virginia House of Delegates from the Mathews and Middlesex Counties district
- In office December 2, 1850 – January 11, 1852
- Preceded by: Alexander K. Shepard
- Succeeded by: George N. Nicholson

Personal details
- Born: Robert Latané Montague; May 23, 1819 Middlesex County, Virginia, U.S.
- Died: March 2, 1880 (aged 60) Middlesex, Virginia, U.S.
- Spouse: Cornelia Gay Eubank

Robert Latané Montague (May 23, 1819 – March 2, 1880) was a Virginia lawyer, politician and judge, before and after the American Civil War. He twice won election to the Virginia House of Delegates, and also served during the Virginia Secession Convention of 1861, as Lieutenant Governor of Virginia (1860 to 1864), and in the Second Confederate Congress from (1864 to 1865). His son Andrew Jackson Montague became Governor of Virginia and a U.S. Congressman, and grandson Robert Latane Montague rose to become a general in the U.S. Marine Corps after receiving the Distinguished Service Cross in World War I.

== Early and family life ==
Montague was born in Middlesex County at Ellaslee plantation in Jamaica, Virginia to Lewis Brooke Montague (1793-1868) and his wife the former Catherine Street Jesse (1803-1852). The family traced its descent from Peter Montague who emigrated from Boveney, England to the Jamestown Colony in 1621. In 1830, his father owned 18 slaves in Middlesex County, and several relatives lived nearby as well as also owned slaves.

Montague attended Fleetwood Academy, a private military school for boys in King and Queen County He then read law with Judge Lomax in Fredericksburg, Virginia, but later decided to continue studies under Nathaniel Beverly Tucker at the College of William and Mary in 1841. Montague subsequently graduated with William & Mary with a law degree in July 1842.

Robert L. Montague married Cornelia Gay Eubank on December 14, 1852. Although at least four of their children died young, three sons survived into adulthood: Julieus Drew Montague, Andrew Jackson Montague, and Robert Lynch Montague.

== Career ==
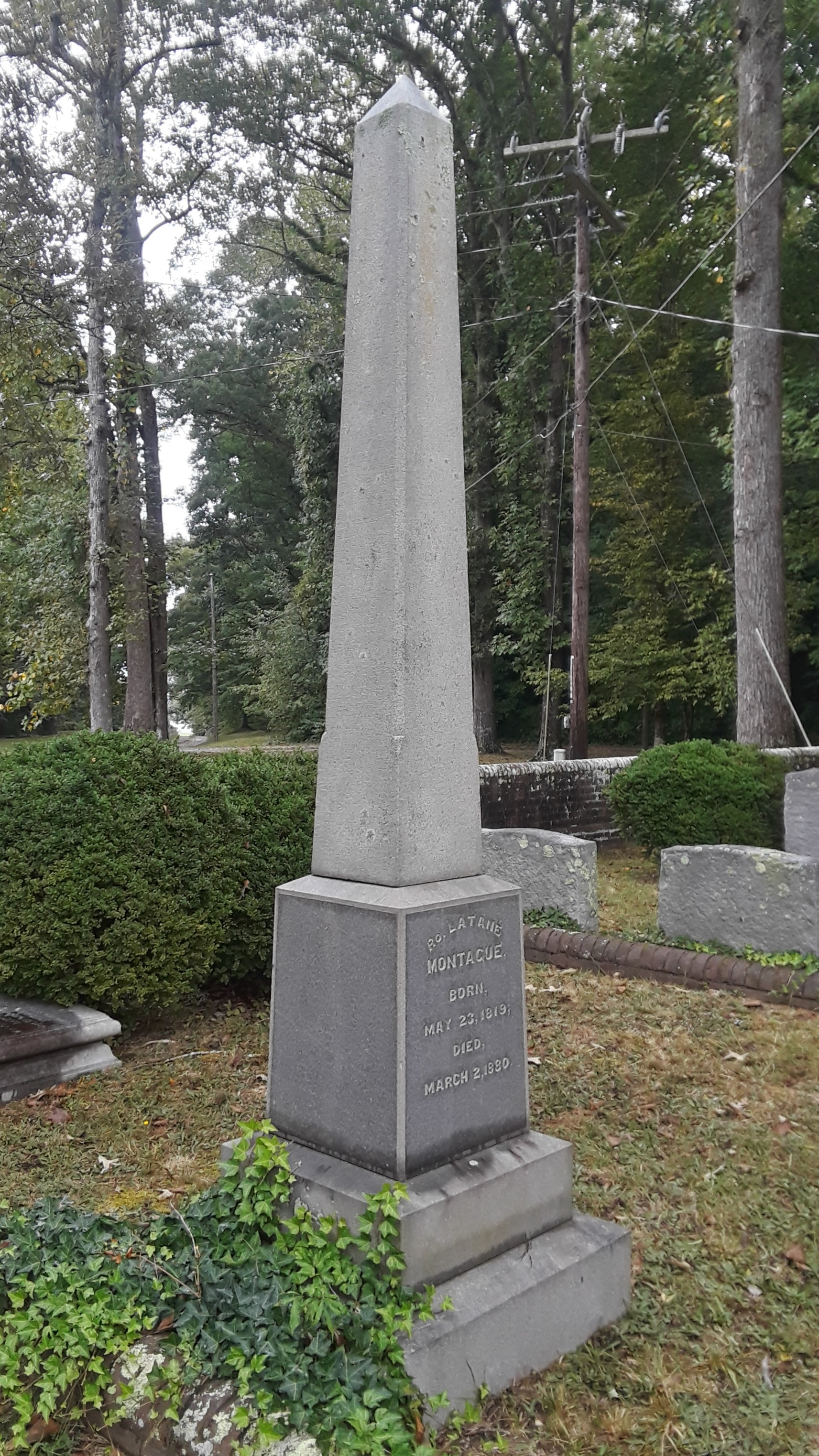
Montague's grave at Christ Church cemetery, Saluda, Virginia

After admission to the Virginia bar, Montague established his legal practice in Middlesex County. When he earned enough money to buy a plantation, he began farming using enslaved labor, in addition to his legal practice. He became politically active as a Democrat campaigning for James Polk in the Presidential Campaign of 1844.

Voters in Mathews and Middlesex Counties elected him to represent them in the Virginia House of Delegates in 1850, but two years later he instead ran for (and was elected) Commonwealth Attorney, which position he held until 1860, having won re-election several times.

Voters from Mathews and Middlesex Counties elected him as a delegate to the Virginia Secession Convention of 1861, and he became the Convention's President after John Janney resigned on November 16, 1861. He was an ardent defender of slavery and secessionist, and was physically in the president's chair when the ordinance of secession passed. Briefly during the American Civil War, Montague led both legislative bodies meeting in Richmond. Elected Virginia's Lieutenant Governor in 1861 (and polling 5000 more votes than John Lechter who led the ticket and was elected Governor of Virginia), Montague served ex officio as President of the Virginia Senate beginning in 1861 until December 21, 1863, when he became one of Virginia's delegates to the Confederate States Congress (1864-1865). His youngest (and favorite) brother, Andrew Jackson Montague, while a cadet at the Virginia Military Institute, volunteered to defend Richmond, and died during the Battle of Gaines' Mill in 1862.

After the war, in 1871, Middlesex County voters again elected him to represent them in the House of Delegates. He represented Middlesex County for one term, before fellow legislators elected him in 1875 to an eight-year term as a judge of the 8th Circuit Court, which he died before finishing.

== Death and legacy ==
Judge Montague died at home of erysipelas on March 2, 1880, and was succeeded as judge of the 8th Circuit by Benjamin W. Lacy. A prominent Baptist (and moderator of the state's Baptist General Association), he was initially buried at Inglewood. However, he was eventually reburied in the family plot at the historic cemetery of Christ Episcopal Church in Middlesex county.
