= Arthur Harrison Motley =

American businessman and publisher (1900–1984)

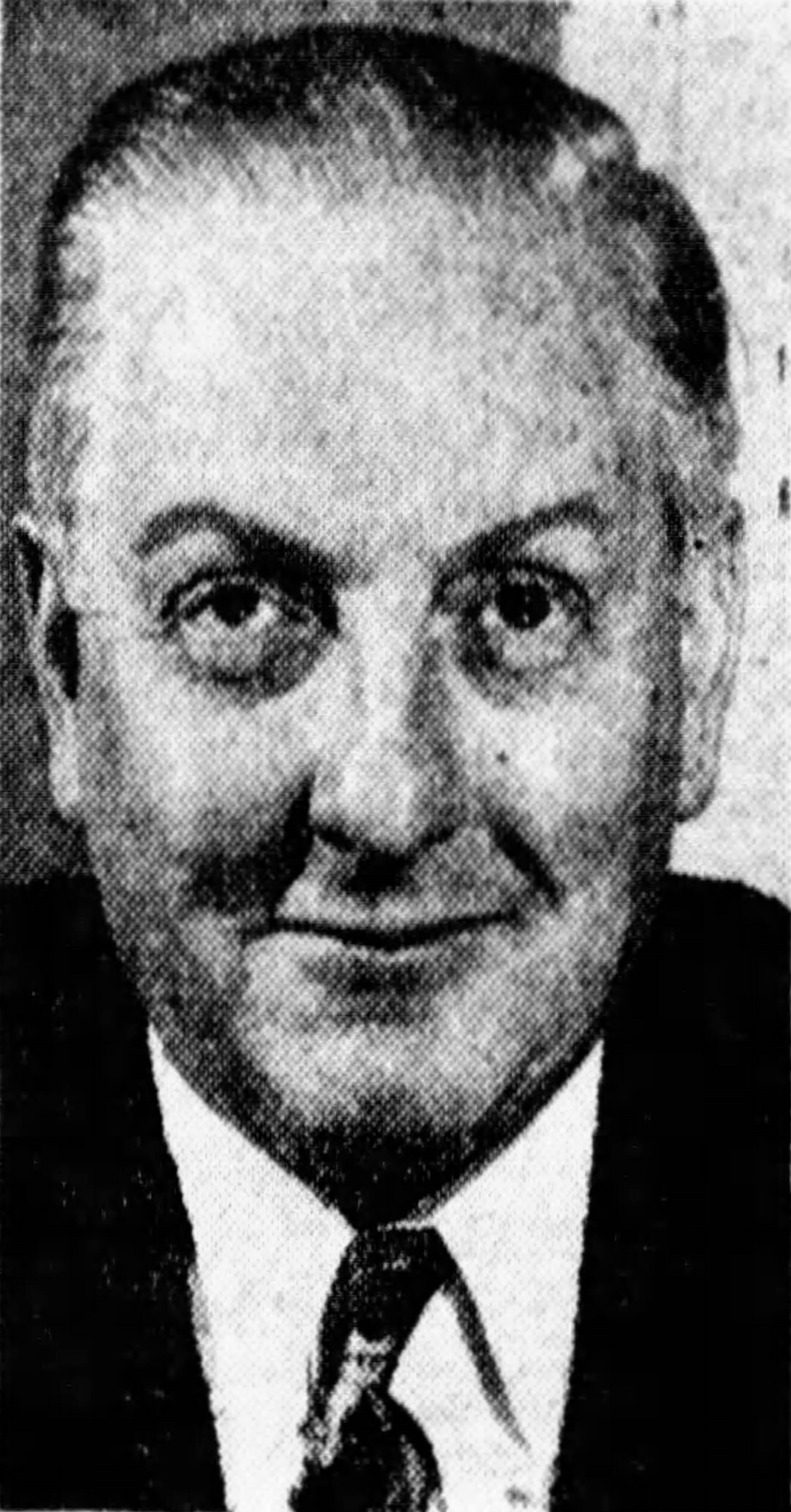
Motley in 1960

Arthur Harrison Motley (August 22, 1900 – May 30, 1984) was an American salesman and advertising executive best known as the publisher of Parade. Under his direction, the magazine expanded its circulation nearly 5-fold.

== Early life ==
Arthur Harrison Motley was born on August 22, 1900, in Minneapolis or outside Jordan, Minnesota. He was raised on his parents' farm, where his father had to supplement the family income by working in road construction. At 13, he launched his first business, "M&G Company": in partnership with his cousin John Groff, he hired a horse and wagon, and the two boys collected ashes and delivered manure and topsoil. When he began high school, his parents moved the family into Minneapolis each winter so that he could have access to better education.

His freshman year at the University of Minnesota was interrupted by the First World War; he enlisted in the United States Army and "spent the war guarding the Willys-Overland building in St. Paul".

When Motley resumed his education, he supported himself through a variety of jobs, including door-to-door salesman and night watchman. He also encountered Professor Frank M. Rarig, who assessed him as shy due to "an inferiority complex" and recommended that he participate in public speaking contests and campus theater activities. By senior year, Motley's primary source of income was theater and the Chautauqua circuit.

In 1922, he graduated, and the next day left Minneapolis for New York City, with the intention of becoming an actor. However, after watching Ed Wynn in The Perfect Fool three times, Motley concluded that he could never meet Wynn's standard, and abandoned that idea.

He next spent a year teaching English at Hamline University in Saint Paul, after which "the faculty decided that this was not [his] vocation". While at Hamline, he had served as Assistant General Secretary of the Zeta Psi fraternity; he subsequently returned to New York, where he became Zeta Psi's general secretary in 1923. He held this position for four years, during which he visited universities throughout North America, launching new Zeta Psi chapters and reviving old ones. In 1927, he attended Columbia Law School, but left after a year.

== Professional life ==
In 1927, Motley joined Smith Brothers, where he was assigned to sell cough syrup as the director of a medicine show (which, he later claimed, led to his being arrested in Syracuse, New York, for holding a parade without a permit); however, that job ended when sales of cough syrup declined in springtime, because "people quit coughing". In 1928, he joined the Crowell-Collier Publishing Company, where he sold advertising space. In this role, "after a brilliant sales performance in the South," he was assigned to Crowell-Collier's Detroit office, where in 1935 he was promoted to manager. In 1941, he became publisher of Crowell-Collier's The American Magazine; under his stewardship, the magazine's "advertising volume doubled and its newsstand circulation tripled."

In 1946, his success with The American Magazine led Marshall Field III to recruit him as publisher of the then-struggling Parade; as an incentive, Field gave him part-ownership. At the time, Parade had a print circulation of approximately 2.1 million; before a year had elapsed, circulation had grown to over 3.6 million, and by 1960, it had reached nearly 10 million, with the magazine's gross revenue having grown from $1.8M (in 1946 dollars) to $25M (in 1960 dollars).

In 1959, Motley and Field sold their interests in Parade to John Hay Whitney; Motley agreed to remain as publisher for at least five more years, and continued holding that position until his retirement in 1978, by which point circulation had reached 21 million, with distribution in 116 newspapers.

== Recognition ==
In 1952, Motley became a director of the United States Chamber of Commerce; he subsequently served as chairman of the membership committee and the political participation committee, and as vice-president, and was elected its president for a two-year term beginning on May 4, 1960.That year, TIME called him "one of the twelve best U.S. salesmen".

In 1985, Motley was posthumously inducted into the Advertising Hall of Fame. He is the namesake of Zeta Psi's "Red Motley Leadership Fund".

== Personal life ==
Motley was an "early member" of Alcoholics Anonymous, and later stated that he was "one of the high-strung people who just can't live with liquor (and) never again, under any circumstances, would I take a drink"; by 1982, he had been sober for 50 years. He attributed his habit of "clipping out news items about people he knew and mailing them to the subjects with brief notes of congratulations" written in red pencil crayon—which he did an estimated 10,000 times per year—to the need to build social bonds with clients despite being unable to go drinking with them; The Washington Post stated that he had been inspired in this by James Farley, who had a similar habit except that Farley used green ink. Some sources attribute his nickname "Red" to this habit, while others attribute it to his red hair.

In 1928, he married Helene Bishop at the Little Church Around the Corner. He and Bishop subsequently had two daughters, who likewise had their weddings at the Little Church: Yvonne to Thomas B. McCabe Jr., son of Thomas B. McCabe, and Marcia to William A. Patterson Jr., son of William A. Patterson.
