= Lake Elsinore Advanced Pumped Storage =

Proposed hydroelectricity power project

The Lake Elsinore Advanced Pumped Storage (LEAPS) project is a proposed 500 megawatt pumped-storage hydroelectricity power project located in Lake Elsinore, California. Its purpose is to provide load balancing and power on-demand to the Southern California grid. The project first sought approval from the Federal Energy Regulatory Commission (FERC) in 2008 and has been rejected twice.

== LEAPS ==
The Lake Elsinore Advanced Pumped Storage (“LEAPS”) project is an energy storage project with generating capacity up to 500MW designed to help stabilize electricity infrastructure and maximize the use of all forms of renewable energy. LEAPS leverages the unique combination of an existing water body, sufficient topographic variation, and proximity to southern California energy markets to construct and operate the most advanced, large-scale pumped hydro storage project in the US to meet California’s growing need for renewable electricity sources. The pumped storage facility serves the power needs of both the San Diego and Los Angeles metropolitan areas; and augments the local economy in the Temescal Valley through: i) significant temporary construction and operations jobs; ii) indirect employment in the hospitality and service sector; iii) payment of municipal and state taxes and fees; iv) contributions through partnerships with community organizations.

In 2015, California set renewable energy targets of 50% of total generation capacity by 2030. LEAPS was designed to help optimize the contribution of renewable sources such as solar and wind energy through the use of renewable, greenhouse gas emissions-free generation and storage capacity. California also has a goal of 100% fossil-fuel free electricity by the year 2045. This project will still rely on fossil fuel and will not meet the 2045 standard.

Nevada Hydro filed its Final License Application (“FLA”) with the Federal Energy Regulatory Commission (“FERC”) on October 2, 2017 and is executing a meeting and review schedule with all relevant agencies in accordance with the terms of the FERC hydro licensing process. In addition, Nevada Hydro is undertaking additional stakeholder communications via its website, project materials, meetings, email bulletins and will be scheduling an open house for residents in the Temescal Valley.
