= St. Austin's Military School =

Defunct military academy in New York, USA

Coordinates: 40.6352°N 74.1055°W

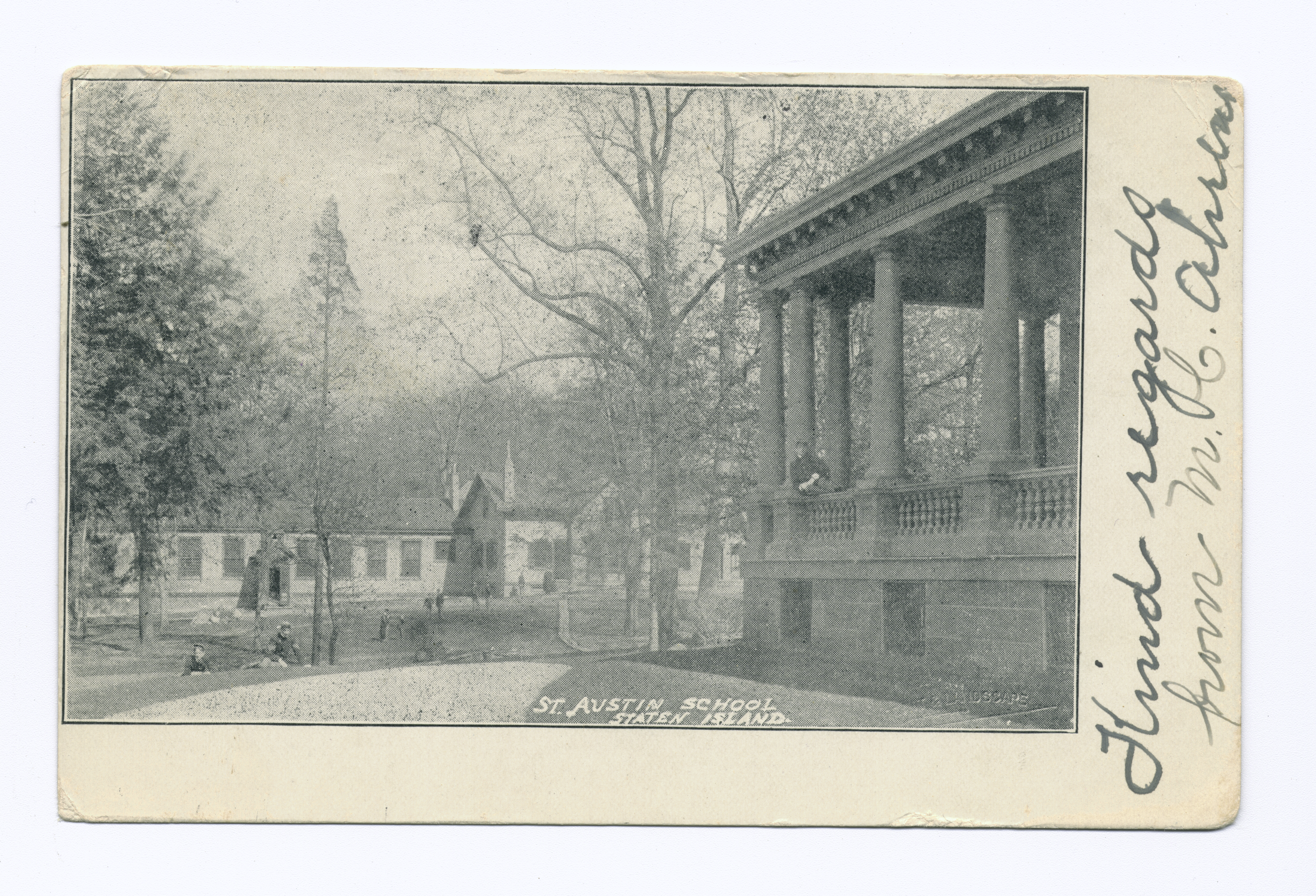
Early 20th century postcard

St. Austin's Military School is a defunct American military academy formerly located in the West Brighton section of Staten Island, New York, United States.

The school was founded in 1883 by the Rev. Alfred G. Mortimer with the name St. Austin's Episcopal School for Boys. The name of the school was soon changed to St. Austin's Military School. In 1898, it moved to Connecticut.

While on Staten Island the school was housed in the former Garner Mansion near the corner of Castleton and Bard Avenues. The building still exists as part of the campus of Richmond University Medical Center. A nearby street named St. Austin's Place is a reminder of the school.

== See also ==
- List of defunct military academies in the United States
- Salisbury School
