= Midwest Military Academy =

Private college preparatory school in Illinois, US

Location
- 1800 Academy Ln; Wheaton, Illinois; United States

Information
- Type: Private, Boarding
- Established: 1931
- Closed: 1986
- Enrollment: 95
- Campus: Wheaton, Illinois

Midwest Military Academy (MMA) was an 5th through 8th grade school in Wheaton, Illinois. The school was demolished in 1988 creating the Academy Highlands subdivision.

Located among 16.5 acres (6.7 ha) at Academy Lane and Orchard Road (1800 Academy Lane previously 425 Foothill Drive), the school was established in 1931. The last owner was Jerry Williams. Upon closure of the school, the Chicago area had one remaining military school located in Aurora, Illinois, the Marmion Military Academy.

Tuition for the year was $4,800 at the time of closing. About a dozen Midwest students transferred to St. John's Military Academy near Lake Geneva.

== History ==
Jerry Williams' father, Paul Williams, a retired Colonel in the U.S. Army, founded MMA as Williams Military Academy in 1931 in Homewood, Illinois. The school was moved to the north part of Wheaton in 1938 followed by the last campus on the south part of Wheaton, which included a Victorian home once owned by industrialist Alfred Plamondon.
