= St. Patrick's Military Academy =

Coordinates: 41°17′41″N 74°10′33″W

St. Patrick's Semi Military Academy (1937-1988)

Location
- Harriman Heights Road; Harriman, New York 10926; United States

Information
- School type: Military academy Not ROTC
- Denomination: Roman Catholic
- Status: Closed
- Closed: 1988
- Principal: Mother Mary Victoria
- Grades: 3-8
- Gender: Males Primarily
- Average class size: 120 Students

St. Patrick's Military Academy was a Catholic Military School in Harriman, New York. It was run by the Pallottine Sisters and closed in June 1988.

== History ==
Until the late 1950s, St. Patrick's offered classes from the 1st to 8th grade, eliminating first grade in 1959 and second grade in 1960. Since 1937, most of the students were boys and boarders but there were a few girls and boys day students from local towns and municipalities.

The school was closed in June 1988 after it was determined that it was a sound course of action. The decline in the interest of boarding military academies and the high cost of monthly tuition, was the principal cause of the school's demise.

The school was established in 1937 and was originally named St. Patrick's Academy and later changed to St. Patrick's Semi Military Academy.

The Alumni of St. Patrick's just recently found out that the school was never located in Harriman, New York, but in Monroe, New York. The address of the school was covered by the Harriman Post Office only.

=== Former School Chaplains ===
- Auxiliary Bishop Joseph Maria Pernicone (Archdiocese of New York) (D)
- Monsignor James Bacon Sullivan (D) (Former Cadet New York Military Academy)
- Father Salvatore Paterno (D)

=== Former Drill Instructors ===
- Mr. Jerry Impellittiere (D)
- Mr. Harry Adams (D)
- Captain Prue
- Major Hickey

=== Former Music Directors ===
- Mrs. Angela Menna Adams (D) Glee Club
- Mr. Robert Ortone (D) Marching Band

=== Former Principals ===
- Mother Mary Vincent (D)
- Mother Mary Valeria (D)
- Sister Mary Victoria Age 97 in 2015

== Campus ==
The St. Patrick's campus was originally built in 1922, when the Pallottine Sisters opened the Mother House of the United States.

Following the school's closure in June 1988, the crosses on top of both buildings were removed. The facilities were later rented to the Monroe-Woodbury Central School District and much later other schools and organizations.

In 2013, in anticipation of selling the property, the entire St. Patrick Military Academy Campus, including the Sister's Residences and Old Chapel were demolished. The sisters moved to new quarters within the property. The property has not been sold, as of June, 2015. The Cornerstone of the Dormitory Building (1960) survived and it is being stored for history.

== Curriculum ==
The Educational Curriculum of the school included 3rd Grade to 8th Grades Grammar School. This included Mathematics, History, English, Geography and Civics. Monsignor Sullivan and the sisters taught religion and the Catechism.

The Bishop came to the school each Easter for Confirmation and Monsignor Sullivan took care of First Holy Communion.

Mass was said each day at the school for the sisters and the students could attend, if requested. Mass was said for the Regiment on Sunday if it was a closed weekend with no free time at home.

== Extracurricular activities ==
The school had a Basketball Team for a while that entered into competition with other local schools. The school had company level baseball teams, but nothing of a serious nature. It was basically considered "Play Time". The school took the children to the then Ford Motor Plant in Mahwah, New York. The school took the children to go Bowling in Monroe, New York. However, the school concentrated its activities surrounding the Glee Club and its Marching Band.

The Glee Club was the best of its class. They performed each year at the Center Concourse of the Port Authority of New York and New Jersey Bus Terminal, In front of the Golden Statue of the Skating Rink at Rockefeller Center and in 1964 at the New York Pavilion of the World's Fair in Flushing, Queens, New York.

The entire Regiment of Cadets marched each year in the New York City St. Patrick's Day parade and Columbus Day parade. The school also sent partial units to include the color guard and the marching band to local Memorial Day events in Monroe, New York.
