= Southern Military Institute =

Proposed all-male Christian military academy

The Southern Military Institute was a proposed all-male Christian military academy. It was proposed as a response to the court decisions allowing women into Virginia Military Institute (VMI) and The Citadel. The proponents wish to create an environment similar to that of VMI in the 19th century. The Southern Poverty Law Center (SPLC) has labeled it a neoconfederate group. Its head is Col. Michael J. Guthrie, Ph.D. (USA Ret.) of Madison, Alabama, a research physicist and retired National Guard Officer. Guthrie has been criticized by the national media and the SPLC for being a former member of the League of the South and for having promoted the school at a convention of the Council of Conservative Citizens.

It was once planned to be built in Shelbyville, Tennessee, but the proponents were not able to raise sufficient funds to purchase the property. Subsequently, the group sought to purchase another site in Middle Tennessee, the old Franklin County High School (FCHS) in Winchester, Tennessee, but that effort was ended July 2006. Earlier attempts at purchasing the former campus of Ambassador College in Big Sandy, Texas and Morristown College in Morristown, Tennessee were also unsuccessful. SMI is currently exploring the possibility of acquiring the old Tennessee Military Institute (TMI) property in Sweetwater, Tennessee and other opportunities in Franklin County, Tennessee. Despite more than 25 years of fundraising, no property has yet been acquired for the campus.
