= Cheviot Hills Military Academy =

American military school (1946–1952)

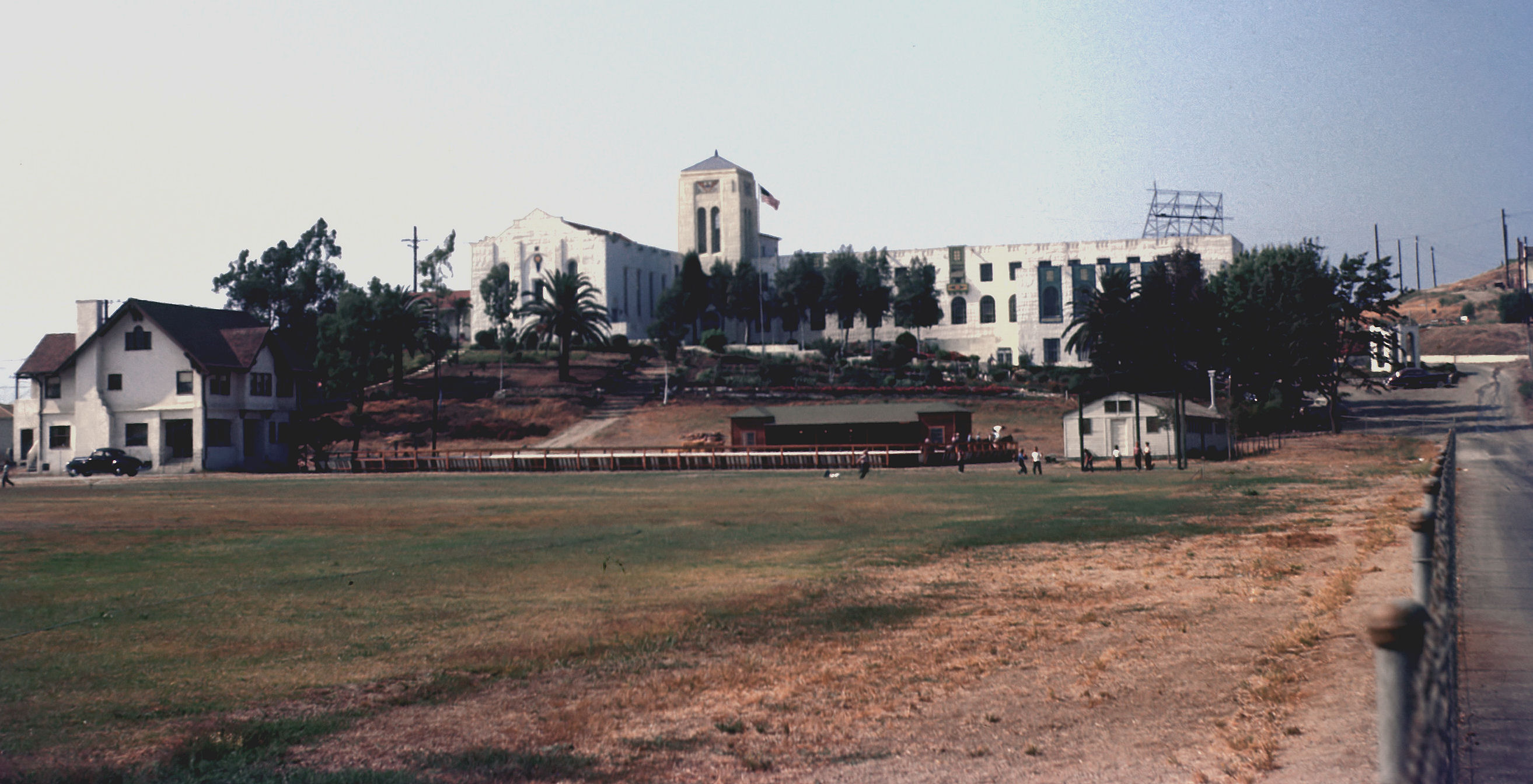
Cheviot Hills Military Academy

Cheviot Hills Military Academy operated as a K–9 military school from 1946 to 1952. Founded by Frank J. Brick, it was established on the premises of the former Pacific Military Academy in Culver City, California. The school was affiliated with the California Cadet Corps, offering a structured, military-style education to its students.

Frank J Brick

During its operation, the academy averaged an enrollment of approximately 150 students across its ten grades. The majority of students boarded on campus in the main building, though a smaller group commuted daily. Military uniforms were mandatory, and the school adhered strictly to a military regimen. Daily routines, such as marching to classes, meals, and recess, were announced by bugle calls and included regular inspections. From reveille to taps, military precision shaped student life.

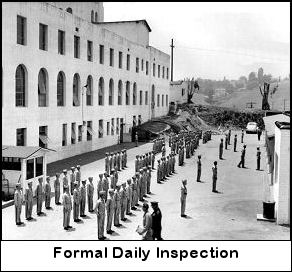
Inspection

The campus was originally built in 1929 as the Pacific Military Academy by Harry Culver, founder of Culver City. Its Florentine-style main building was designed by renowned architect Wallace Neff, known for his contributions to Southern California architecture (Neff, Architectural Digest, 1930). During World War II, the campus was repurposed as military barracks for the U.S. Army's First Motion Picture Unit. Notably, Ronald Reagan, then a young Army officer, was stationed there; surviving footage shows him in the building's cafeteria (U.S. National Archives, Film Footage, 1943).

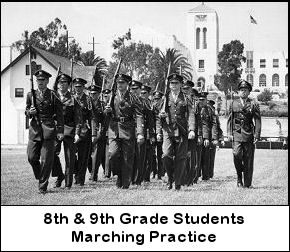
Students marching

In 1952, the property, located at 9601 Cattaraugus Ave., was sold to the Marianists (Society of Mary) and became Chaminade High School for Boys. The address was later changed to Beverly Drive in 1959. Chaminade Preparatory moved to West Hills in the San Fernando Valley in 1962, and the property was sold to developers. The historic building was demolished to make way for residential development. Today, only four palm trees remain as remnants of the original property, now integrated into the backyards of homes along Beverly Drive (Los Angeles County Property Records, 1962).

In the top picture with the main building at the center, the laundry and staff residences are on the left, the horse corrals in the center and the athletic field house on the right. The classrooms were located in a single story building behind the main structure. They can be seen in the right side of the inspection picture.

The site was bordered by Cattaraugus Avenue to the south, Castle Heights Avenue to the west, Beverlywood Street to the north, and S. Beverly Drive to the east. The academy’s main building was located on Beverlywood Street, just west of S. Beverly Drive. Additional structures included classrooms, a laundry facility, and staff residences. Athletic fields and horse corrals were also part of the campus layout (Culver City Historical Society, Preservation Report, 2001).

== Sources ==
- 1951–1952 CHMA Hilltop School Annuals
- History of Culver City, California
- History of Pacific Military Academy
- History of Chaminade High School
