= Honolulu Military Academy =

School in Hawaii, United States

Coordinates: 21.2701°N 157.7990°W

The Honolulu Military Academy was founded by its president, Col. L. G. Blackman, in 1911. It was controlled by a board of 10 trustees, of which the president was a member and presiding officer ex officio. It had no endowment, but owned a fine piece of property consisting of about 100 acres (0.40 km^{2}) of ground and six buildings, and was valued at $200,000. It was located at Kaimuki near Wai'alae Bay, a mile from the end of the Waialae street-car line. The buildings stood on high ground overlooking the ocean.

The school drew its cadets from all points in the islands. The 1918-19 roster showed 64 from Honolulu, 10 from Oahu outside of Honolulu, 16 from Hawaii, 11 from Maui, 10 from Kauai, 1 from Molokai, 2 from California, and 1 each from New York State, Minnesota, and Japan. The military regime was a dominant feature of the school's organization, as the name of the Academy indicates. It began by providing only elementary grade instruction, and later grew to offer a 12-grade program of studies. The school was split into three divisions: an elementary school, grades 1–6; a junior academy, grades 7, 8, 9; and a senior academy, grades 10, 11, 12.

In 1925, the school merged with Punahou Academy.
