= 2007 California League season =

- League: California League
- Sport: Baseball
- Duration: April 5 – September 3
- Games: 140
- Teams: 10

Regular season
- League champions: Lancaster JetHawks
- Season MVP: Bubba Bell, Lancaster JetHawks

Playoffs
- League champions: San Jose Giants
- Runners-up: Lake Elsinore Storm

CALL seasons
- ← 2006 2008 →

The 2007 California League was a Class A-Advanced baseball season played between April 5 and September 3. Ten teams played a 140-game schedule, as three teams from each division qualified for the post-season, the winner of each half of the season plus playoff qualifiers.

The San Jose Giants won the California League championship, as they defeated the Lake Elsinore Storm in the final round of the playoffs.

== Team changes ==
- The High Desert Mavericks ended their affiliation with the Kansas City Royals and began a new affiliation with the Seattle Mariners.
- The Inland Empire 66ers ended their affiliation with the Seattle Mariners and began a new affiliation with the Los Angeles Dodgers.
- The Lancaster JetHawks ended their affiliation with the Arizona Diamondbacks and began a new affiliation with the Boston Red Sox.
- The Visalia Oaks ended their affiliation with the Tampa Bay Devil Rays and began a new affiliation with the Arizona Diamondbacks.

== Teams ==
2007 California League
Division	Team	City	MLB Affiliate	Stadium
North	Bakersfield Blaze	Bakersfield, California	Texas Rangers	Sam Lynn Ballpark
North	Modesto Nuts	Modesto, California	Colorado Rockies	John Thurman Field
North	San Jose Giants	San Jose, California	San Francisco Giants	San Jose Municipal Stadium
North	Stockton Ports	Stockton, California	Oakland Athletics	Banner Island Ballpark
North	Visalia Oaks	Visalia, California	Arizona Diamondbacks	Recreation Park
South	High Desert Mavericks	Adelanto, California	Seattle Mariners	Stater Bros. Stadium
South	Inland Empire 66ers	San Bernardino, California	Los Angeles Dodgers	Arrowhead Credit Union Park
South	Lake Elsinore Storm	Lake Elsinore, California	San Diego Padres	Lake Elsinore Diamond
South	Lancaster JetHawks	Lancaster, California	Boston Red Sox	Clear Channel Stadium
South	Rancho Cucamonga Quakes	Rancho Cucamonga, California	Los Angeles Angels of Anaheim	Rancho Cucamonga Epicenter

== Map of teams ==
North Division South Division

== Regular season ==
=== Summary ===
- The Lancaster JetHawks finished with the best record in the regular season for the first time since 2000.

=== Standings ===
North Division
Team	Win	Loss	%	GB
Visalia Oaks	77	63	.550	–
Modesto Nuts	76	64	.543	1
San Jose Giants	73	67	.521	4
Stockton Ports	64	76	.457	13
Bakersfield Blaze	57	83	.407	20
South Division
Team	Win	Loss	%	GB
Lancaster JetHawks	83	57	.593	–
Lake Elsinore Storm	74	65	.532	8.5
Inland Empire 66ers	72	67	.518	10.5
Rancho Cucamonga Quakes	69	71	.493	14
High Desert Mavericks	54	86	.386	29

== League Leaders ==
=== Batting leaders ===
Stat	Player	Total
AVG	Bubba Bell, Lancaster JetHawks	.370
H	Zach Daeges, Lancaster JetHawks	170
R	Zach Daeges, Lancaster JetHawks	124
2B	Zach Daeges, Lancaster JetHawks	55
3B	Eric Young Jr., Modesto Nuts	11
HR	Tommy Everidge, Stockton Ports	26
RBI	Zach Daeges, Lancaster JetHawks	113
SB	Eric Young Jr., Modesto Nuts	73

=== Pitching leaders ===
Stat	Player	Total
W	Brandon Hynick, Modesto Nuts	16
ERA	Brandon Hynick, Modesto Nuts	2.52
CG	Brok Butcher, Rancho Cucamonga Quakes; Brandon Hynick, Modesto Nuts	3
SHO	Marlon Arias, Inland Empire 66ers Brok Butcher, Rancho Cucamonga Quakes; Anthony Cupps, Visalia Oaks; Kevin Deaton, Stockton Ports; Brandon Hynick, Modesto Nuts; Alex McRobbie, Rancho Cucamonga Quakes; Andrew Walker, Bakersfield Blaze	1
SV	Chad Rhoades, Lancaster JetHawks; Daniel Stange, Visalia Oaks	16
IP	Brandon Hynick, Modesto Nuts	182.1
SO	Joe Martinez, San Jose Giants	151

== Playoffs ==
- The San Jose Giants won their seventh California League championship, as they defeated the Lake Elsinore Storm in five games.

=== Playoff bracket ===
Division semi-finals
N1	San Jose	bye
N2	Visalia	2
N3	Modesto	1
S1	Lancaster	bye
S2	Lake Elsinore	2
S3	Inland Empire	1

Division finals
N1	San Jose	3
N2	Visalia	1
S1	Lancaster	1
S2	Lake Elsinore	3

Finals
N1	San Jose	3
S2	Lake Elsinore	2

== Awards ==
California League awards
Award name	Recipient
Most Valuable Player	Bubba Bell, Lancaster JetHawks

== See also ==
- 2007 Major League Baseball season
