= 2009 California League season =

- League: California League
- Sport: Baseball
- Duration: April 9 – September 7
- Games: 140
- Teams: 10

Regular season
- League champions: San Jose Giants
- Season MVP: Alex Liddi, High Desert Mavericks

Playoffs
- League champions: San Jose Giants
- Runners-up: High Desert Mavericks

CALL seasons
- ← 2008 2010 →

The 2009 California League was a Class A-Advanced baseball season played between April 9 and September 7. Ten teams played a 140-game schedule, as three teams from each division qualified for the post-season, the winner of each half of the season plus playoff qualifiers.

The San Jose Giants won the California League championship, as they defeated the High Desert Mavericks in the final round of the playoffs.

== Team changes ==
- The Lancaster JetHawks ended their affiliation with the Boston Red Sox and began a new affiliation with the Houston Astros.
- The Visalia Oaks are renamed to the Visalia Rawhide. The club remained affiliated with the Arizona Diamondbacks.

== Teams ==
2009 California League
Division	Team	City	MLB Affiliate	Stadium
North	Bakersfield Blaze	Bakersfield, California	Texas Rangers	Sam Lynn Ballpark
North	Modesto Nuts	Modesto, California	Colorado Rockies	John Thurman Field
North	San Jose Giants	San Jose, California	San Francisco Giants	San Jose Municipal Stadium
North	Stockton Ports	Stockton, California	Oakland Athletics	Banner Island Ballpark
North	Visalia Rawhide	Visalia, California	Arizona Diamondbacks	Recreation Park
South	High Desert Mavericks	Adelanto, California	Seattle Mariners	Stater Bros. Stadium
South	Inland Empire 66ers	San Bernardino, California	Los Angeles Dodgers	Arrowhead Credit Union Park
South	Lake Elsinore Storm	Lake Elsinore, California	San Diego Padres	Lake Elsinore Diamond
South	Lancaster JetHawks	Lancaster, California	Boston Red Sox	Clear Channel Stadium
South	Rancho Cucamonga Quakes	Rancho Cucamonga, California	Los Angeles Angels of Anaheim	Rancho Cucamonga Epicenter

== Map of teams ==
North Division South Division

== Regular season ==
=== Summary ===
- The San Jose Giants finished with the best record in the regular season for the second consecutive season.

=== Standings ===
North Division
Team	Win	Loss	%	GB
San Jose Giants	93	47	.664	–
Modesto Nuts	75	65	.536	18
Bakersfield Blaze	75	65	.536	18
Visalia Rawhide	64	76	.457	29
Stockton Ports	61	79	.436	32
South Division
Team	Win	Loss	%	GB
High Desert Mavericks	83	57	.593	–
Lake Elsinore Storm	73	67	.521	10
Rancho Cucamonga Quakes	61	79	.436	22
Inland Empire 66ers	59	81	.421	24
Lancaster JetHawks	56	84	.400	27

== League Leaders ==
=== Batting leaders ===
Stat	Player	Total
AVG	Koby Clemens, Lancaster JetHawks	.345
H	JB Shuck, Lancaster JetHawks	175
R	Jon Gaston, Lancaster JetHawks	119
2B	Koby Clemens, Lancaster JetHawks; Jason Van Kooten, Modesto Nuts	45
3B	Jon Gaston, Lancaster JetHawks	15
HR	Jon Gaston, Lancaster JetHawks	35
RBI	Koby Clemens, Lancaster JetHawks	121
SB	Tyson Gillies, High Desert Mavericks	44

=== Pitching leaders ===
Stat	Player	Total
W	Donald Hume, High Desert Mavericks	17
ERA	Alex Torres, Rancho Cucamonga Quakes	2.74
CG	Cory Riordan, Modesto Nuts; Jake Wild, High Desert Mavericks	2
SHO	Mario Álvarez, Inland Empire 66ers Richard Bleier, Bakersfield Blaze; Paul Oseguera, San Jose Giants; Ryan Tatusko, Bakersfield Blaze	1
SV	Craig Baker, Modesto Nuts	33
IP	Cory Riordan, Modesto Nuts	169.2
SO	Josh Collmenter, Visalia Oaks	152

== Playoffs ==
- The San Jose Giants won their eighth California League championship, as they defeated the High Desert Mavericks in three games.

=== Playoff bracket ===
Division semi-finals
N1	San Jose	bye
N2	Modesto	1
N3	Bakersfield	2
S1	High Desert	bye
S2	Lake Elsinore	0
S3	Rancho Cucamonga	2

Division finals
N1	San Jose	3
N3	Bakersfield	2
S1	High Desert	3
S2	Rancho Cucamonga	2

Finals
N1	San Jose	3
S1	High Desert	0

== Awards ==
California League awards
Award name	Recipient
Most Valuable Player	Alex Liddi, High Desert Mavericks

== See also ==
- 2009 Major League Baseball season
