= List of California League champions =

The California League of Minor League Baseball is a Single-A baseball league in the United States. The league was founded in 1941, but ceased operations from 1942 to 1945 during World War II. The circuit reorganized in 1946 and was in continual operation through 2020. The 2020 season was cancelled due to the COVID-19 pandemic, and the league ceased operations before the 2021 season in conjunction with Major League Baseball's (MLB) reorganization of Minor League Baseball. In place of the California League, MLB created the Low-A West, an 8-team circuit divided into two divisions. Prior to the 2022 season, MLB renamed the Low-A West as the California League, and it carried on the history of the league prior to reorganization. In 2021, the Low-A West held a best-of-five series between the top two teams in the league, regardless of division standings, to determine a league champion.

A league champion has been determined at the end of each season by either postseason playoffs or being declared champion by the league office. In 2019, the first-half winner in each division (North and South) received a bye into the second round, or division series. Each division's second-half winner and wild card team, the team with the best winning percentage over the entire season to have not won either half of the season, faced each other in a best-of-three series. The winner of this mini-series met the division's first-half winner in a best-of-five series to determine division champions. Then, the North and South division winners played a best-of-five series to determine a league champion. As of 2022, the winners of each division from both the first and second halves of the season meet in a best-of-three division series, with the winners of the two division series meeting in a best-of-three championship series.

== League champions ==
Score and finalist information is only presented when postseason play occurred. The lack of this information indicates a declared league champion.

Year	Champion	Score	Finalist
1941	Santa Barbara Saints	4–1	Fresno Cardinals
1942	Not in operation		
1943	Not in operation		
1944	Not in operation		
1945	Not in operation		
1946	Stockton Ports	4–0	Modesto Reds
1947	Stockton Ports	4–0	Santa Barbara Dodgers
1948	Santa Barbara Dodgers	4–3	Stockton Ports
1949	San Jose Red Sox	4–1	Ventura Yankees
1950	Modesto Reds	4–1	Stockton Ports
1951	Santa Barbara Dodgers	4–1	Visalia Cubs
1952	Fresno Cardinals	4–2	San Jose Red Sox
1953	San Jose Red Sox	4–2	Stockton Ports
1954	Modesto Reds	4–1	San Jose Red Sox
1955	Fresno Cardinals	3–1	Stockton Ports
1956	Fresno Cardinals	3–1	Stockton Ports
1957	Salinas Packers	3–1	Reno Silver Sox
1958	Fresno Giants	3–1	Visalia Redlegs
1959	Modesto Reds	4–2	Bakersfield Bears
1960	Reno Silver Sox	—	—
1961	Reno Silver Sox	—	—
1962	San Jose Bees	4–3	Reno Silver Sox
1963	Stockton Ports	2–0	Modesto Colts
1964	Fresno Giants	—	—
1965	Stockton Ports	2–0	San Jose Bees
1966	Modesto Reds	—	—
1967	San Jose Bees	2–0	Modesto Reds
1968	Fresno Giants	2–1	San Jose Bees
1969	Stockton Ports	2–1	Visalia Mets
1970	Bakersfield Dodgers	—	—
1971	Visalia Mets	2–0	Fresno Giants
1972	Modesto Reds	2–0	Bakersfield Dodgers
1973	Lodi Lions	2–0	Bakersfield Dodgers
1974	Fresno Giants	3–2	San Jose Bees
1975	Reno Silver Sox	—	—
1976	Reno Silver Sox	3–1	Salinas Angels
1977	Lodi Dodgers	3–0	Salinas Angels
1978	Visalia Oaks	3–2	Lodi Dodgers
1979	San Jose Missions	3–2	Stockton Ports
1980	Stockton Ports	3–0	Visalia Oaks
1981	Lodi Dodgers	3–2	Visalia Oaks
1982	Modesto A's	4–2	Visalia Oaks
1983	Redwood Pioneers	3–1	Visalia Oaks
1984	Modesto A's	3–1	Bakersfield Dodgers
1985	Fresno Giants	3–2	Stockton Ports
1986	Stockton Ports	3–0	Visalia Oaks
1987	Fresno Giants	4–3	Reno Padres
1988	Riverside Red Wave	3–0	Stockton Ports
1989	Bakersfield Dodgers	3–0	Stockton Ports
1990	Stockton Ports	3–2	Bakersfield Dodgers
1991	High Desert Mavericks	3–2	Stockton Ports
1992	Stockton Ports	3–1	Visalia Oaks
1993	High Desert Mavericks	3–2	Modesto A's
1994	Rancho Cucamonga Quakes	3–1	Modesto A's
1995	San Bernardino Spirit	3–0	San Jose Giants
1996	Lake Elsinore Storm	3–2	San Jose Giants
1997	High Desert Mavericks	3–0	San Bernardino Stampede
1998	San Jose Giants	3–1	Rancho Cucamonga Quakes
1999	San Bernardino Stampede	3–2	San Jose Giants
2000	San Bernardino Stampede	3–0	Visalia Oaks
2001^{[a]}	San Jose Giants; Lake Elsinore Storm	—	—
2002	Stockton Ports	3–1	Lake Elsinore Storm
2003	Inland Empire 66ers	3–0	Stockton Ports
2004	Modesto A's	3–2	Lancaster JetHawks
2005	San Jose Giants	3–2	Lake Elsinore Storm
2006	Inland Empire 66ers	3–2	Visalia Oaks
2007	San Jose Giants	3–2	Lake Elsinore Storm
2008	Stockton Ports	3–1	Lancaster JetHawks
2009	San Jose Giants	3–0	High Desert Mavericks
2010	San Jose Giants	3–2	Rancho Cucamonga Quakes
2011	Lake Elsinore Storm	3–1	Stockton Ports
2012	Lancaster JetHawks	3–0	Modesto Nuts
2013	Inland Empire 66ers	3–0	San Jose Giants
2014	Lancaster JetHawks	3–2	Visalia Rawhide
2015	Rancho Cucamonga Quakes	3–0	San Jose Giants
2016	High Desert Mavericks	3–0	Visalia Rawhide
2017	Modesto Nuts	3–0	Lancaster JetHawks
2018	Rancho Cucamonga Quakes	3–0	Visalia Rawhide
2019	Visalia Rawhide	3–1	Lake Elsinore Storm
2020	None (season cancelled due to COVID-19 pandemic)		
2021	San Jose Giants	3–0	Fresno Grizzlies
2022	Lake Elsinore Storm	2–0	Fresno Grizzlies
2023	Modesto Nuts	2–0	Rancho Cucamonga Quakes
2024	Modesto Nuts	2–1	Lake Elsinore Storm
2025	San Jose Giants	2–0	Inland Empire 66ers
2026	Lake Elsinore Storm	2–1	San Jose Giants

== Championship wins by team ==
Active California League teams appear in bold.

Wins	Team	Championship years
13	**San Jose Red Sox / Bees / Missions / Giants**	1949, 1953, 1962, 1967, 1979, 1998, 2001, 2005, 2007, 2009, 2010, 2021, 2025
11	**Modesto Reds / A's / Nuts**	1950, 1954, 1959, 1966, 1972, 1982, 1984, 2004, 2017, 2023, 2024
11	**Stockton Ports**	1946, 1947, 1963, 1965, 1969, 1980, 1986, 1990, 1992, 2002, 2008
9	Fresno Cardinals / Giants	1952, 1955, 1956, 1958, 1964, 1968, 1974, 1985, 1987
6	**San Bernardino Stampede / Spirit / Inland Empire 66ers**	1995, 1999, 2000, 2003, 2006, 2013
5	**Lake Elsinore Storm**	1996, 2001, 2011, 2022, 2026
4	High Desert Mavericks	1991, 1993, 1997, 2016
4	Reno Silver Sox	1960, 1961, 1975, 1976
3	Santa Barbara Saints / Dodgers	1941, 1948, 1951
3	Lodi Lions / Dodgers	1973, 1977, 1981
3	**Rancho Cucamonga Quakes**	1994, 2015, 2018
3	**Visalia Mets / Oaks / Rawhide**	1971, 1978, 2019
2	Bakersfield Dodgers	1970, 1989
2	Lancaster JetHawks	2012, 2014
1	Redwood Pioneers	1983
1	Riverside Red Wave	1988
1	Salinas Packers	1957

== Notes ==
- ^{a} San Jose and Lake Elsinore were declared co-champions after playoffs were cancelled in the wake the September 11, 2001 terrorist attacks.
