= 2003 California League season =

- League: California League
- Sport: Baseball
- Duration: April 3 – September 1
- Games: 140
- Teams: 10

Regular season
- League champions: Visalia Oaks
- Season MVP: Josh Barfield, Lake Elsinore Storm

Playoffs
- League champions: Inland Empire 66ers
- Runners-up: Stockton Ports

CALL seasons
- ← 2002 2004 →

The 2003 California League was a Class A-Advanced baseball season played between April 3 and September 1. Ten teams played a 140-game schedule, as three teams from each division qualified for the post-season, the winner of each half of the season plus playoff qualifiers.

The Inland Empire 66ers won the California League championship, as they defeated the Stockton Ports in the final round of the playoffs.

== Team changes ==
- The San Bernardino Stampede are renamed to the Inland Empire 66ers. The club remained affiliated with the Seattle Mariners.
- The Stockton Ports ended their affiliation with the Cincinnati Reds and began a new affiliation with the Texas Rangers.
- The Visalia Oaks ended their affiliation with the Oakland Athletics and began a new affiliation with the Colorado Rockies.

== Teams ==
2003 California League
Division	Team	City	MLB Affiliate	Stadium
North	Bakersfield Blaze	Bakersfield, California	Tampa Bay Devil Rays	Sam Lynn Ballpark
North	Modesto A's	Modesto, California	Oakland Athletics	John Thurman Field
North	San Jose Giants	San Jose, California	San Francisco Giants	San Jose Municipal Stadium
North	Stockton Ports	Stockton, California	Texas Rangers	Billy Hebert Field
North	Visalia Oaks	Visalia, California	Colorado Rockies	Recreation Park
South	High Desert Mavericks	Adelanto, California	Milwaukee Brewers	Maverick Stadium
South	Inland Empire 66ers	San Bernardino, California	Seattle Mariners	Arrowhead Credit Union Park
South	Lake Elsinore Storm	Lake Elsinore, California	San Diego Padres	Lake Elsinore Diamond
South	Lancaster JetHawks	Lancaster, California	Arizona Diamondbacks	The Hangar
South	Rancho Cucamonga Quakes	Rancho Cucamonga, California	Anaheim Angels	Rancho Cucamonga Epicenter

== Map of teams ==
North Division South Division

== Regular season ==
=== Summary ===
- The Visalia Oaks finished with the best record in the regular season for the first time since 1990.

=== Standings ===
North Division
Team	Win	Loss	%	GB
Visalia Oaks	79	61	.564	–
Stockton Ports	77	63	.550	2
Modesto A's	74	66	.529	5
Bakersfield Blaze	70	70	.500	9
San Jose Giants	58	82	.414	21
South Division
Team	Win	Loss	%	GB
Inland Empire 66ers	78	62	.557	–
Lake Elsinore Storm	75	65	.536	3
Rancho Cucamonga Quakes	74	66	.529	4
Lancaster JetHawks	73	67	.521	5
High Desert Mavericks	42	98	.300	36

== League Leaders ==
=== Batting leaders ===
Stat	Player	Total
AVG	Greg Jacobs, Inland Empire 66ers	.357
H	Josh Barfield, Lake Elsinore Storm	185
R	Jayson Nix, Visalia Oaks	107
2B	Josh Barfield, Lake Elsinore Storm; Jayson Nix, Visalia Oaks	46
3B	Shin-Soo Choo, Inland Empire 66ers	13
HR	Kyle Nichols, Lancaster JetHawks	31
RBI	Josh Barfield, Lake Elsinore Storm	128
SB	Chris Morris, High Desert Mavericks	67

=== Pitching leaders ===
Stat	Player	Total
W	Brad Weis, Modesto A's	15
ERA	Ervin Santana, Rancho Cucamonga Quakes	2.53
CG	Brad Weis, Modesto A's	3
SHO	Jeff Francis, Visalia Oaks; Ryan Ketchner, Inland Empire 66ers	2
SV	Pete Sikaras, Lancaster JetHawks	23
IP	Jake Woods, Rancho Cucamonga Quakes	171.1
SO	Ryan Ketchner, Inland Empire 66ers	159

== Playoffs ==
- The Inland Empire 66ers won their fourth California League championship, as they defeated the Stockton Ports in three games.

=== Playoff bracket ===
Division semi-finals
N1	Stockton	bye
N2	Visalia	2
N3	Modesto	0
S1	Rancho Cucamonga	bye
S2	Inland Empire	2
S3	Lake Elsinore	0

Division finals
N1	Stockton	3
N2	Visalia	2
S1	Rancho Cucamonga	1
S2	Inland Empire	3

Finals
N1	Stockton	0
S2	Inland Empire	3

== Awards ==
California League awards
Award name	Recipient
Most Valuable Player	Josh Barfield, Lake Elsinore Storm

== See also ==
- 2003 Major League Baseball season
