= 2008 California League season =

- League: California League
- Sport: Baseball
- Duration: April 3 – September 1
- Games: 140
- Teams: 10

Regular season
- League champions: San Jose Giants
- Season MVP: Carlos Santana, Inland Empire 66ers

Playoffs
- League champions: Stockton Ports
- Runners-up: Lancaster JetHawks

CALL seasons
- ← 2007 2009 →

The 2008 California League was a Class A-Advanced baseball season played between April 3 and September 1. Ten teams played a 140-game schedule, as three teams from each division qualified for the post-season, the winner of each half of the season plus playoff qualifiers.

The Stockton Ports won the California League championship, as they defeated the Lancaster JetHawks in the final round of the playoffs.

== Teams ==
2008 California League
Division	Team	City	MLB Affiliate	Stadium
North	Bakersfield Blaze	Bakersfield, California	Texas Rangers	Sam Lynn Ballpark
North	Modesto Nuts	Modesto, California	Colorado Rockies	John Thurman Field
North	San Jose Giants	San Jose, California	San Francisco Giants	San Jose Municipal Stadium
North	Stockton Ports	Stockton, California	Oakland Athletics	Banner Island Ballpark
North	Visalia Oaks	Visalia, California	Arizona Diamondbacks	Recreation Park
South	High Desert Mavericks	Adelanto, California	Seattle Mariners	Stater Bros. Stadium
South	Inland Empire 66ers	San Bernardino, California	Los Angeles Dodgers	Arrowhead Credit Union Park
South	Lake Elsinore Storm	Lake Elsinore, California	San Diego Padres	Lake Elsinore Diamond
South	Lancaster JetHawks	Lancaster, California	Boston Red Sox	Clear Channel Stadium
South	Rancho Cucamonga Quakes	Rancho Cucamonga, California	Los Angeles Angels of Anaheim	Rancho Cucamonga Epicenter

== Map of teams ==
North Division South Division

== Regular season ==
=== Summary ===
- The San Jose Giants finished with the best record in the regular season for the first time since 2006.
- The Inland Empire 66ers defeated the Rancho Cucamonga Quakes in a tie-breaking game to clinch the third playoff seed in the South Division.

=== Standings ===
North Division
Team	Win	Loss	%	GB
San Jose Giants	85	55	.607	–
Stockton Ports	76	64	.543	9
Modesto Nuts	70	69	.504	14.5
Visalia Oaks	67	72	.482	17.5
Bakersfield Blaze	62	78	.443	23
South Division
Team	Win	Loss	%	GB
Lancaster JetHawks	76	64	.543	–
Lake Elsinore Storm	71	69	.507	3
Inland Empire 66ers	68	73	.482	8.5
Rancho Cucamonga Quakes	67	74	.475	9.5
High Desert Mavericks	58	82	.414	18

== League Leaders ==
=== Batting leaders ===
Stat	Player	Total
AVG	Carlos Santana, Inland Empire 66ers	.323
H	Cedric Hunter, Lake Elsinore Storm	186
R	Chris Carter, Stockton Ports	101
2B	Eric Sogard, Lake Elsinore Storm	42
3B	P.J. Phillips, Rancho Cucamonga Quakes	11
HR	Chris Carter, Stockton Ports	39
RBI	Chris Carter, Stockton Ports	104
SB	Peter Bourjos, Rancho Cucamonga Quakes	50

=== Pitching leaders ===
Stat	Player	Total
W	Sean O'Sullivan, Rancho Cucamonga Quakes	16
ERA	Tim Alderson, San Jose Giants	2.79
CG	Trevor Bell, Rancho Cucamonga Quakes; Aneury Rodríguez, Modesto Nuts	2
SHO	Aneury Rodríguez, Modesto Nuts	2
SV	Andrew Johnston, Modesto Nuts	24
IP	Barry Enright, Visalia Oaks	164.1
SO	Barry Enright, Visalia Oaks	143

== Playoffs ==
- The Stockton Ports won their eleventh California League championship, as they defeated the Lancaster JetHawks in four games.

=== Playoff bracket ===
Division semi-finals
N1	San Jose	bye
N2	Stockton	2
N3	Modesto	1
S1	Lancaster	bye
S2	Lake Elsinore	2
S3	Inland Empire	0

Division finals
N1	San Jose	2
N2	Stockton	3
S1	Lancaster	3
S2	Lake Elsinore	2

Finals
N2	Stockton	3
S1	Lancaster	1

== Awards ==
California League awards
Award name	Recipient
Most Valuable Player	Carlos Santana, Inland Empire 66ers

== See also ==
- 2008 Major League Baseball season
