= Kody Clemens =

American baseball player (born 1996)

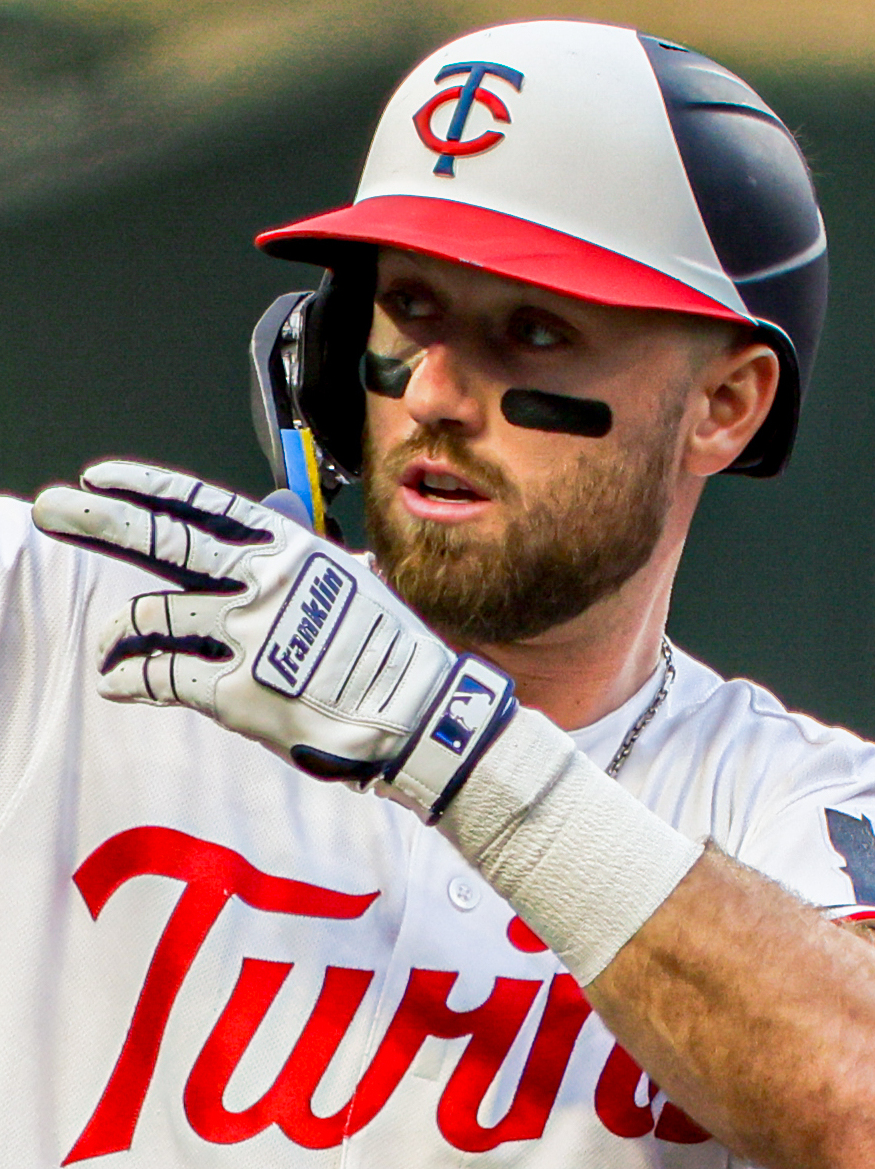
- Clemens in 2026

Minnesota Twins – No. 2
- Utility player
- Born: May 15, 1996 (age 30); Houston, Texas, U.S.
- Bats: Left Throws: Right

MLB debut
- May 31, 2022, for the Detroit Tigers

MLB statistics (through 2026 season)
- Batting average: .220
- Home runs: 60
- Runs batted in: 181
- Stats at Baseball Reference

Teams
- Detroit Tigers (2022); Philadelphia Phillies (2023–2025); Minnesota Twins (2025–present)

Kody Alec Clemens (born May 15, 1996) is an American professional baseball utility player for the Minnesota Twins of Major League Baseball (MLB). He has previously played in MLB for the Detroit Tigers and Philadelphia Phillies. Clemens is the son of seven-time Cy Young Award winner Roger Clemens.

Clemens played college baseball for the Texas Longhorns. He was selected by the Tigers with the 79th overall pick of the 2018 MLB draft. He made his major league debut for the Tigers in 2022 and was traded to Philadelphia after the 2022 season.

== Early life ==
Clemens attended Memorial High School in Houston, Texas. Playing for the school's baseball team, he batted .553 during his senior season. He was named first team all-district selection in 2013 and was a Perfect Game Honorable Mention for high school in 2013 and 2014. He committed to the University of Texas at Austin to play college baseball for the Texas Longhorns.

== College career ==
As a freshman in 2016 he batted with a .242 batting average and five home runs. As a sophomore in 2017, Clemens underwent Tommy John surgery. However, Clemens did play as the team's designated hitter. Clemens had a breakout junior season, batting .352 with 23 home runs. These stats earned him Big 12 player of the week. On June 7, 2018, Clemens was named a finalist for the Golden Spikes Award and the Dick Howser Trophy.

== Professional career ==
=== Detroit Tigers ===
==== Minor leagues ====
The Detroit Tigers selected Clemens in the third round, with the 79th overall pick, in the 2018 Major League Baseball draft. He received a $600,000 signing bonus and made his professional debut with the West Michigan Whitecaps of the Single–A Midwest League. He was promoted to the Lakeland Flying Tigers of the High–A Florida State League in August. In 52 total games between the two clubs, Clemens slashed .288/.365/.450 with five home runs and 20 RBI. Clemens began 2019 with Lakeland, before being promoted to the Double–A Erie SeaWolves at the end of the season. Over 128 games between both teams, he batted .231/.310/.397 with 12 home runs and 63 RBIs.

In July 2020, as a result of the COVID-19 pandemic, the entire minor league baseball season was canceled. Rather than sit idle, Clemens signed on to play for Team Texas of the Constellation Energy League, a makeshift four-team independent league. He was subsequently named MVP of his team. Clemens spent the 2021 season with the Triple-A Toledo Mud Hens, slashing .247/.312/.466 with 18 home runs and 59 RBI in 97 games. He was selected to the 40-man roster following the season on November 19, 2021, in order to be protected from the Rule 5 draft. Clemens returned to Toledo for the start of the 2022 season.

==== Major leagues ====
On May 30, 2022, the Tigers promoted Clemens to the major leagues when Robbie Grossman was placed on the injured list. On June 13, Clemens recorded his first major league hit, a single off of Lance Lynn of the Chicago White Sox. Two days later Clemens made his major league pitching debut in a game in which the Tigers were being blown out and used three position players to pitch after the game was out of reach, thus saving the bullpen. Clemens pitched one inning, soft tossing on orders of manager A. J. Hinch, and gave up one run. On June 25, Clemens hit his first major league home run, a three-run, go-ahead shot off of Joe Mantiply of the Arizona Diamondbacks, helping the Tigers win the game by a 6 to 3 score. Clemens was optioned back down to Toledo on July 12, but recalled nine days later. On September 5, Clemens again pitched in a rout of the Tigers, and while once again soft tossing, recorded the first MLB strikeout of his pitching career, against the 2021 American League MVP Shohei Ohtani of the Los Angeles Angels. On October 4, Clemens hit his first career grand slam off of Seattle Mariners starter Justus Sheffield.

=== Philadelphia Phillies ===
On January 7, 2023, the Tigers traded Clemens and pitcher Gregory Soto to the Philadelphia Phillies for outfielder Matt Vierling, infielder Nick Maton, and catcher Donny Sands. Clemens was optioned to the Triple-A Lehigh Valley IronPigs to begin the 2023 season but was recalled on April 7. On July 2, Clemens was sent back to the Triple-A, where he would remain for the rest of the season. In 47 games, he had hit .230 with four home runs and 13 RBI.

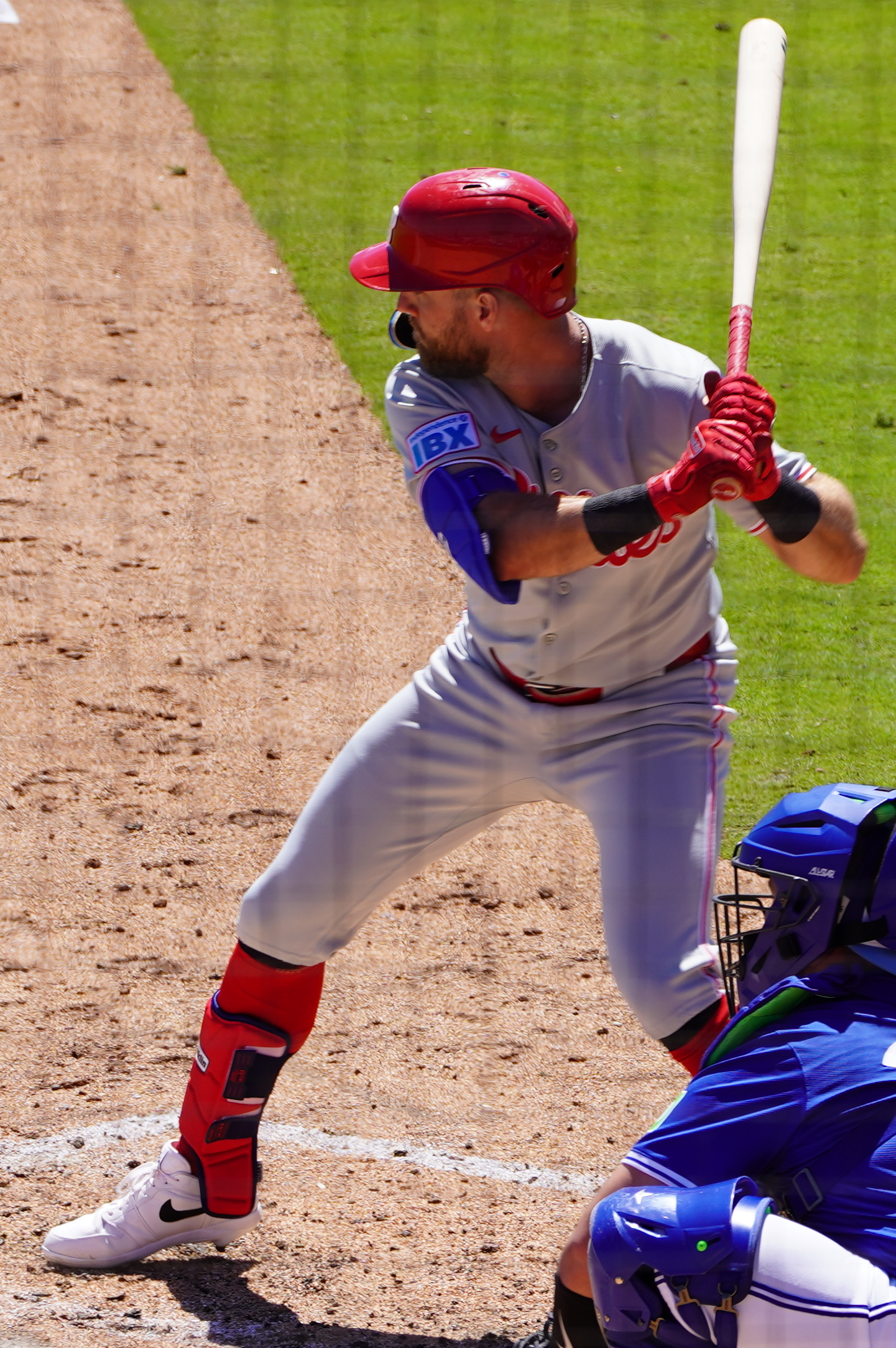
Clemens in March 2025

Clemens was again optioned to Triple–A Lehigh Valley to begin the 2024 season. After Bryce Harper was placed on paternity leave, Clemens was recalled from Lehigh Valley for 3 games. On May 18, Clemens hit a game-tying homerun with 2 outs in the bottom of the 9th inning with the Phillies down 3-2 vs. the Washington Nationals. The Phillies would go on to win the game, 4-3.

Clemens made the Phillies' Opening Day roster for the 2025 season, beating out Buddy Kennedy for the spot originally meant to be taken by Weston Wilson before he was injured. In seven games for Philadelphia, he went 0-for-6 with a walk. Clemens was designated for assignment by the Phillies on April 23, 2025.

=== Minnesota Twins ===
On April 26, 2025, The Phillies traded Clemens to the Minnesota Twins for cash considerations. He homered in his first career game against the Boston Red Sox at Fenway Park, the stadium his father called home for 13 seasons, on May 3. Clemens hit a walk-off double to help beat the Cleveland Guardians on May 19, 2025. On September 12, Clemens hit three home runs in a game against the Arizona Diamondbacks.

Clemens hit an ultimate grand slam against the Kansas City Royals on July 30, 2026. It came when the Twins were down to their final strike with two outs, the first player to do so since David Bote on August 12, 2018.

== Personal life ==
Clemens is the son of former MLB pitcher Roger Clemens. Clemens has three brothers: Koby, Kory, and Kacy. Koby also played baseball professionally. All four have names starting with the letter "K", which in baseball scorekeeping represents a strikeout.

== See also ==
- List of Major League Baseball ultimate grand slams
