= Zach Daeges =

American baseball player (born 1983)

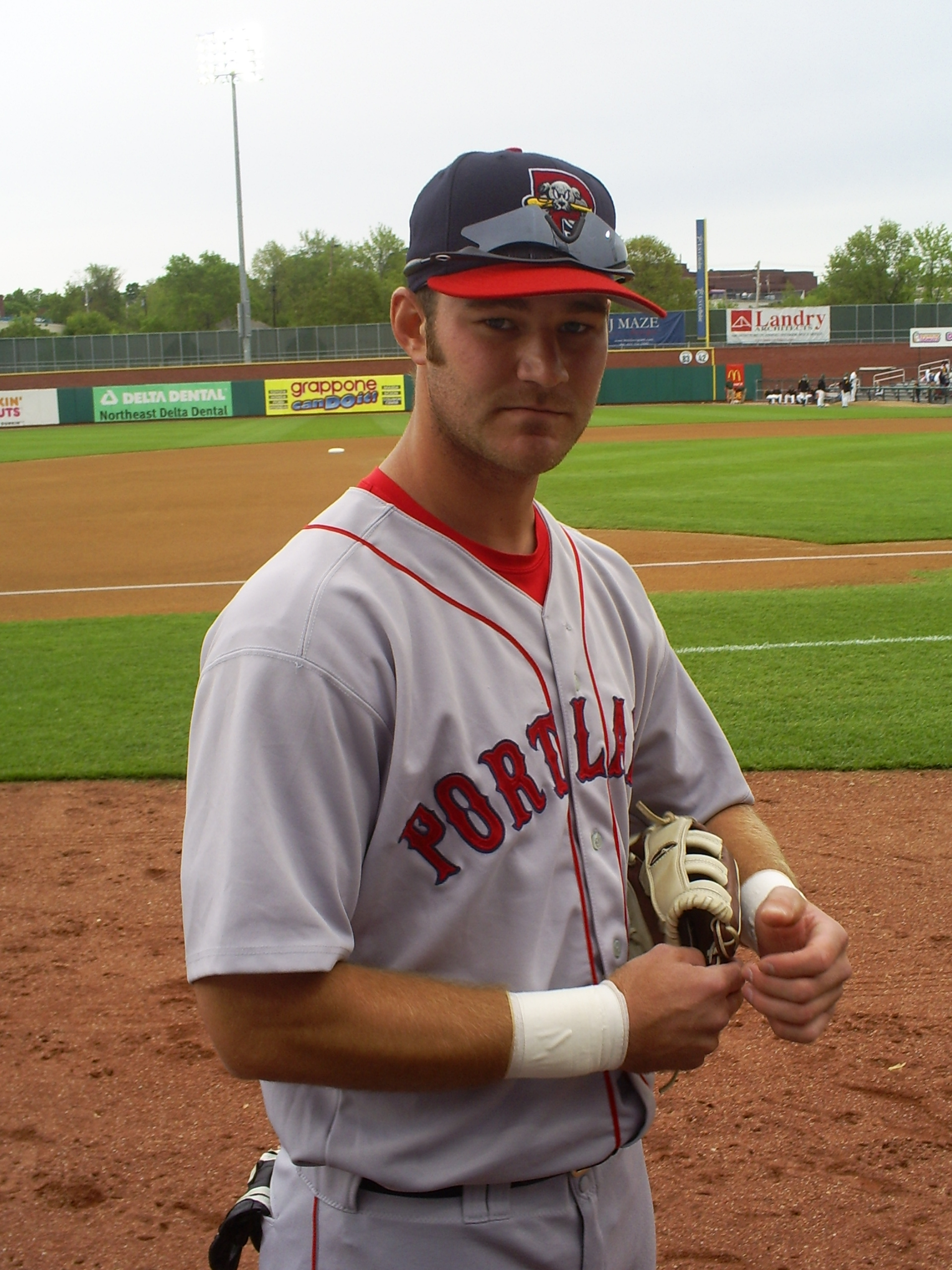
- Daeges while playing for the Portland Sea Dogs
- Outfielder
- Born: November 16, 1983 (age 42); Omaha, Nebraska, U.S.
- Bats: Left Throws: Right
- Stats at Baseball Reference

Zach Daeges (born November 16, 1983) is an American former professional baseball outfielder, formerly in the Boston Red Sox organization. Daeges was drafted by Red Sox in the 6th round of the 2006 MLB draft. He last played with the Pawtucket Red Sox of the Triple-A International League in 2009, but missed most of 2009 and 2010 with a severe ankle injury. In 2006, while playing baseball for the Creighton University Bluejays, Daeges was named a second team All-American at third base.

== High school and college ==
Daeges was born in Omaha, Nebraska and moved as a teenager with his family to Iowa He attended Harlan Community High School in Harlan, Iowa before choosing to attend Creighton University in Omaha, Nebraska, where he studied accounting. Prior to the 2005 season, Daeges had Tommy John surgery, which forced him out of the field the following season. In 2005 as a designated hitter, Daeges was named to the third team Academic All-American team as well as to the first-team All Missouri Valley Conference squad. As a senior in 2006, he was named a second team All American as a third baseman and first team All Missouri Valley Conference after hitting .350 in 180 at-bats with 13 home runs and 49 runs batted in.

== Professional career ==
Daeges was drafted with the 150th overall pick in the 2006 Major League Baseball draft by the Boston Red Sox. In 2006, he joined the Lowell Spinners, the Low-A affiliate of the Red Sox in the New York – Penn League (NYPL). With the Spinners, he drove in 32 runs while hitting .288 with 57 hits in 55 games, for which he was named a NYPL all-star. In 2007, with the High-A Lancaster JetHawks, Daeges hit .330 with 21 home runs, 113 runs batted in and 170 hits in 127 games. He was named by MiLB.com as the High-A Offensive Player of the Year after the season and set the California League record for doubles in a season with 25 games remaining. The following year with the Double-A Portland Sea Dogs, Daeges hit .308 with six home runs, 63 runs batted in and 121 hits in 108 games. He was also the Sea Dogs player of the year and an Eastern League all-star. During the 2008 off-season, Daeges traveled to Venezuela to play for the Leones del Caracas in the Venezuelan Professional Baseball League, with whom he batted .208 with six hits in eight games. Prior to the 2009 season, he was a SoxProspects.com all-star selection and the 24th-best minor-league prospect in the Red Sox organization. With the Pawtucket Red Sox, Daeges injured his ankle in spring training and missed all but 9 games of the 2009 season due to the severe injury. Following the season, Daeges had surgery to remove the Os Trigonum bone; it was discovered that he is one of the rare people with an extra bone in his ankle. Despite the injury, Red Sox officials were not concerned that it would affect his development. Prior to the 2010 season, Daeges was invited to the Boston Red Sox spring training. However, Daeges missed all of the 2010 season due to injury as well. After playing two games and going 0-for-6 with the Lowell Spinners in 2011, Daeges was released by the Red Sox organization on August 6, 2011.
