= Koby Clemens =

American baseball player & coach (born 1986)

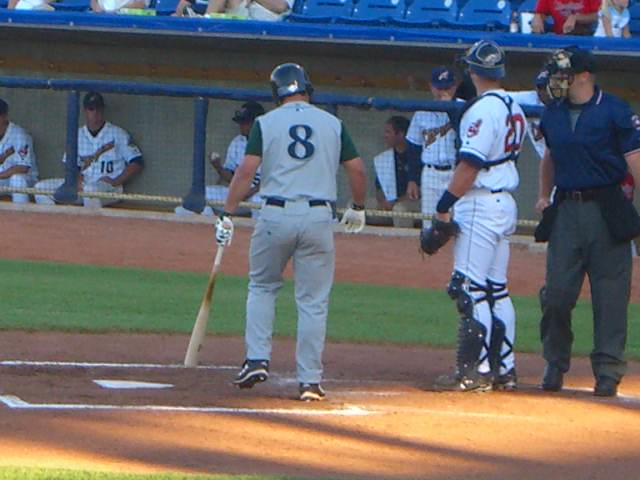
- Clemens (no. 8) batting in June 2006
- Infielder / Outfielder
- Born: December 4, 1986 (age 39); Houston, Texas, U.S.
- Bats: Right Throws: Right
- Stats at Baseball Reference

Koby Aaron Clemens (born December 4, 1986) is an American former professional baseball infielder and outfielder. He later served as a coach in the Houston Astros farm system. He is the eldest son of former Major League Baseball pitcher Roger Clemens.

== Early life ==
Born on December 4, 1986, in Houston, Texas, Clemens was a two-sport star at Memorial High School, splitting time between football and baseball, before he suffered a back injury ending his brief football career.

Clemens had a .413 batting average as a junior, with 4 home runs and 23 runs batted in (RBIs) in 2004. He had a .519 batting average and was named all-state in his senior year. As a pitcher, he had a 7–1 record and a 1.75 earned run average (ERA).

Clemens signed with the University of Texas at Austin (where his father played) on November 17, 2004, to play as a first baseman, but never attended, choosing to go straight to professional baseball after he was drafted by the Houston Astros.

== Professional career ==
=== Draft and minor leagues ===
The Houston Astros selected Clemens in the eighth round of the 2005 Major League Baseball draft, 254th overall. The Astros organization had intended to use him as corner infielder. He signed for a $380,000 bonus.

In 2005, Clemens played his first season in Minor League Baseball, batting .297 with 4 home runs and 17 RBIs in 33 games for the Rookie League Greeneville Astros, and .281 with 6 RBIs in 9 games with the Class A Tri-City ValleyCats. He committed 15 errors in 32 games at third base.

In 2006, Clemens played with the Class A Lexington Legends of the South Atlantic League, where he batted .229 with 5 home runs and 39 RBIs in 91 games. His sole appearance as a pitcher in professional baseball was for the Legends in 2006. On June 25, 2006, Clemens was in the news in a game against the Asheville Tourists. He was declared safe in a controversial play on second, leading the Tourists manager Joe Mikulik to go on a rampage.

Through 2006 in the minors, Clemens batted .249 with 9 home runs, 63 RBIs, 7 stolen bases (while being caught once), and a .385 slugging percentage in 449 at bats. That season, he hit a home run off his 43-year-old father, Roger Clemens, in a minor league exhibition game. In Koby's next at bat, Roger threw a brushback pitch at Koby in retaliation. Father and son also played a game together in 2006, when the elder Clemens was making his comeback with the Astros and pitched a game for Lexington.

In the 2006 Hawaiian Winter League, playing for North Shore Honu, Clemens batted .196 with one home run and nine RBIs in 32 games. In 2007, he returned to Lexington, where he batted .252 with 15 home runs and 56 RBIs in 115 games. In 2008, he played with the Class A-Advanced Salem Avalanche in the Carolina League, batting .268.

Clemens converted to play as a catcher and played for the Corpus Christi Hooks in the Double-A Texas League. In June 2009, he returned to play with the Lancaster JetHawks of the Class A-Advanced California League in the roles of a catcher and designated hitter. In 2010, he again played for Corpus Christi, then played with the Peoria Javelinas in the Arizona Fall League. In 2011, Clemens was with the Houston Astros' Triple-A affiliate, the Oklahoma City RedHawks of the Pacific Coast League, as their first baseman.

Clemens started playing at the Puerto Rico Baseball League with the Mayagüez Indians as a first baseman in the fall of 2011. However, he abandoned the team abruptly on November 10, 2011. There were rumors his father persuaded him to leave the island because of the kidnapping of Washington Nationals catcher Wilson Ramos in Venezuela the day before. For abandoning the team with no reason given, Clemens was banned from playing baseball in the Caribbean Baseball Confederation.

On February 9, 2012, Clemens signed a minor-league contract with the Toronto Blue Jays. During the 2012 season, he played for the Blue Jays' Double-A affiliate, the New Hampshire Fisher Cats of the Eastern League, and their Class A-Advanced team, the Dunedin Blue Jays of the Florida State League as a catcher, first baseman, third baseman, outfielder, and designated hitter. He was released at the end of the season.

Clemens played one game for the Sugar Land Skeeters of the independent Atlantic League of Professional Baseball in 2012, then returned to the team for the 2013 and 2014 seasons. In 2014, he played a game as catcher during which his father pitched. He did not play professionally after 2014.

== Post-playing career ==
In February 2015, Clemens was hired as a minor league spring training instructor for the Houston Astros' farm system. He also owns his own company, Koby Clemens Baseball Clinics, offering individual and private lessons.

== Personal life ==
Clemens has three brothers, Kory, Kacy, and Kody Clemens. All four have names starting with the letter "K", which in baseball scorekeeping designates a strikeout.
