= Josh Barfield =

American baseball player (born 1982)

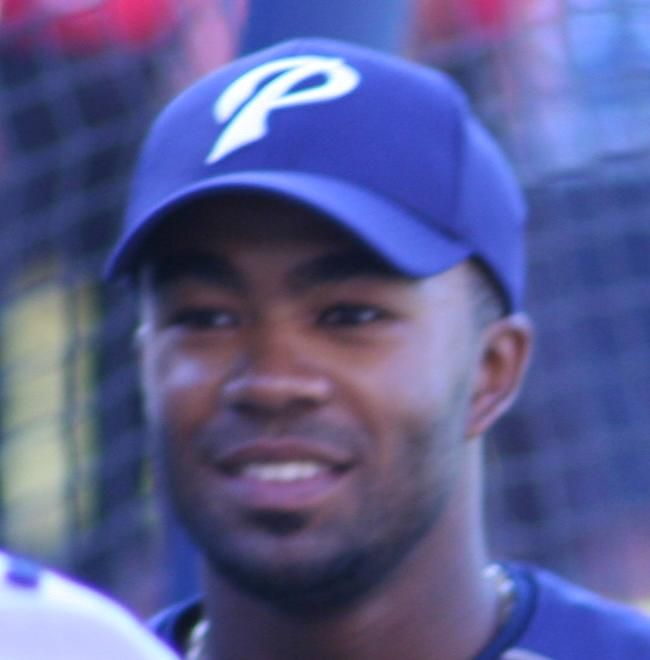
- Barfield with the San Diego Padres
- Second baseman
- Born: December 17, 1982 (age 43); Barquisimeto, Lara, Venezuela
- Batted: Right Threw: Right

MLB debut
- April 3, 2006, for the San Diego Padres

Last MLB appearance
- June 25, 2009, for the Cleveland Indians

MLB statistics
- Batting average: .264
- Home runs: 16
- Runs batted in: 112
- Stats at Baseball Reference

Teams
- San Diego Padres (2006); Cleveland Indians (2007–2009)

Joshua LaRoy Barfield (born December 17, 1982) is an American professional baseball executive and former second baseman. He is the son of former major league outfielder Jesse Barfield. Barfield was born in Venezuela during his mother's two-week winterball visit with his father. He attended Klein High School, located near Houston, Texas, and holds the District 5 single season home run record.

His younger brother Jeremy Barfield was drafted by the Oakland Athletics in the eighth round (244th overall) of the 2008 Major League Baseball draft.

== Professional career ==
=== San Diego Padres ===
Barfield was drafted in the fourth round (120th overall) of the 2001 Major League Baseball draft by the San Diego Padres. In 2004 and 2005, Baseball America listed him as the Padres' number one prospect. In 2006, he fell to third in the organization behind pitcher Cesar Carrillo and catcher George Kottaras.

Barfield made his major league debut April 3, 2006, and collected his first career hit with a single off San Francisco Giants pitcher Jason Schmidt. His first major league home run came April 17, 2006, at Coors Field against the Colorado Rockies, a 431-foot solo shot to left-center field, off Jeff Francis.

On September 4, 2006, against the Rockies in Petco Park, Barfield hit a walk-off home run, a three-run home run off Brian Fuentes that gave the Padres a 7–5 victory. He claimed that he had not hit a walk-off home run at any level of baseball prior to that.

Barfield played in 150 games during his rookie season with the Padres, batting .280 with 32 doubles, 13 home runs, 58 RBI and 21 stolen bases (in 26 attempts). In the 2006 National League Division Series, he batted .250 with a double and walk as the Padres lost in four games to the St. Louis Cardinals.

=== Cleveland Indians ===
On November 8, 2006, Barfield was traded to the Cleveland Indians for third baseman Kevin Kouzmanoff and pitcher Andrew Brown.

Barfield began the 2007 season as the Indians everyday second baseman, but in August, after poor hitting, he began to lose starts to Asdrúbal Cabrera. He finished 2007 with a .243 batting average, three home runs, and 50 RBI in 130 games. Barfield made one appearance in the 2007 postseason, stealing a base in Game 2 of the 2007 American League Championship Series.

Barfield entered spring training in 2008 as a utility player hopeful, but was ultimately optioned to Triple-A Buffalo on March 25. He was called up by Cleveland on June 9 to replace Cabrera, who was hitting a team low .184. At the time of his call-up, Barfield had an average of .255 with five home runs and 21 RBI in 62 games for the Triple-A Buffalo Bisons. In his second game after being called up, he sprained a finger and was placed on the disabled list on June 12. He was activated on September 1, and spent the remainder of the season in the majors. He batted .182 with 2 RBI in 12 games with Cleveland.

On March 28, 2009, it was announced that Barfield had made the Indians' Opening Day roster as a utility player. He was optioned to the Triple-A Columbus Clippers on April 15. Barfield was recalled again on May 2, and immediately made an impact in his first game back, hitting a go-ahead single in the 12th inning of a 9–7 win over the Toronto Blue Jays on May 4. Despite going a perfect 3-for-3 with an RBI in his at bats, he was optioned back to Columbus on May 12 to make room on the roster for Jamey Carroll. On June 3, Barfield was recalled again when Asdrúbal Cabrera went down with a sprained shoulder. He was optioned to Columbus again on June 29, and was later removed from Cleveland's 40-man roster on August 11. He batted .400 with 2 RBI in 17 games with Cleveland.

=== San Diego Padres (second stint) ===
On February 19, 2010, Barfield signed a minor league contract with the San Diego Padres with an invite to spring training. He spent the entire season with the Triple-A Portland Beavers, batting .296 with five home runs and 36 RBI in 78 games.

=== Philadelphia Phillies ===
On November 19, 2010, Barfield signed a minor league contract with the Philadelphia Phillies. In 127 games with the Triple-A Lehigh Valley IronPigs, he batted .257 with six home runs and 55 RBI.

=== Baltimore Orioles ===
On March 21, 2012, Barfield signed a minor league contract with the Baltimore Orioles. He was released on April 29 after going 0-for-8 with a walk and three strikeouts in four games with the Triple-A Norfolk Tides. The Orioles re-signed him to another minor league deal on May 21, and he was assigned to the Double-A Bowie Baysox, where he batted .267 with a home run and 30 RBI in 80 games.

=== Long Island Ducks ===
On March 6, 2013, Barfield signed with the independent Long Island Ducks of the Atlantic League of Professional Baseball. He batted .296 with seven home runs and 36 RBI in 86 games.

== Post-playing career ==
As of 2016, Barfield was listed as a professional scout, based in Scottsdale, Arizona, for the Arizona Diamondbacks. For four years, Barfield was the director of player development for the Diamondbacks. In September 2023, he was hired as assistant general manager for the Chicago White Sox.

== See also ==
- List of second-generation Major League Baseball players
- List of Major League Baseball players from Venezuela
