= 2006 California League season =

- League: California League
- Sport: Baseball
- Duration: April 6 – September 4
- Games: 140
- Teams: 10

Regular season
- League champions: San Jose Giants
- Season MVP: Reid Brignac, Visalia Oaks

Playoffs
- League champions: Inland Empire 66ers
- Runners-up: Visalia Oaks

CALL seasons
- ← 2005 2007 →

The 2006 California League was a Class A-Advanced baseball season played between April 6 and September 4. Ten teams played a 140-game schedule, as three teams from each division qualified for the post-season, the winner of each half of the season plus playoff qualifiers.

The Inland Empire 66ers won the California League championship, as they defeated the Visalia Oaks in the final round of the playoffs.

== Teams ==
2006 California League
Division	Team	City	MLB Affiliate	Stadium
North	Bakersfield Blaze	Bakersfield, California	Texas Rangers	Sam Lynn Ballpark
North	Modesto Nuts	Modesto, California	Colorado Rockies	John Thurman Field
North	San Jose Giants	San Jose, California	San Francisco Giants	San Jose Municipal Stadium
North	Stockton Ports	Stockton, California	Oakland Athletics	Banner Island Ballpark
North	Visalia Oaks	Visalia, California	Tampa Bay Devil Rays	Recreation Park
South	High Desert Mavericks	Adelanto, California	Kansas City Royals	Maverick Stadium
South	Inland Empire 66ers	San Bernardino, California	Seattle Mariners	Arrowhead Credit Union Park
South	Lake Elsinore Storm	Lake Elsinore, California	San Diego Padres	Lake Elsinore Diamond
South	Lancaster JetHawks	Lancaster, California	Arizona Diamondbacks	Clear Channel Stadium
South	Rancho Cucamonga Quakes	Rancho Cucamonga, California	Los Angeles Angels of Anaheim	Rancho Cucamonga Epicenter

== Map of teams ==
North Division South Division

== Regular season ==
=== Summary ===
- The San Jose Giants finished with the best record in the regular season for the second consecutive season.

=== Standings ===
North Division
Team	Win	Loss	%	GB
San Jose Giants	82	58	.586	–
Visalia Oaks	75	65	.536	7
Stockton Ports	69	71	.493	13
Modesto Nuts	66	74	.471	16
Bakersfield Blaze	58	82	.414	26
South Division
Team	Win	Loss	%	GB
Lake Elsinore Storm	74	66	.529	–
High Desert Mavericks	73	67	.521	1
Inland Empire 66ers	72	68	.514	2
Lancaster JetHawks	68	72	.486	6
Rancho Cucamonga Quakes	63	77	.450	11

== League Leaders ==
=== Batting leaders ===
Stat	Player	Total
AVG	Luis Pérez, Stockton Ports	.334
H	Chris Rahl, Lancaster JetHawks	186
R	Fernando Perez, Visalia Oaks	123
2B	Chris Nowak, Visalia Oaks	45
3B	Chris Frey, Modesto Nuts; Fernando Perez, Visalia Oaks	9
HR	Brandon Burgess, Lancaster JetHawks	26
RBI	Chris Nowak, Visalia Oaks	103
SB	Emilio Bonifácio, Lancaster JetHawks	61

=== Pitching leaders ===
Stat	Player	Total
W	James Houser, Visalia Oaks; Chris Mason, Visalia Oaks	12
ERA	Franklin Morales, Modesto Nuts	3.68
CG	Doug Mathis, Bakersfield Blaze; Greg Smith, Lancaster JetHawks	2
SHO	Greg Smith, Lancaster JetHawks	2
SV	Brian Anderson, San Jose Giants	37
IP	Fernando Rodriguez, Rancho Cucamonga Quakes	163.1
SO	Franklin Morales, Modesto Nuts	179

== Playoffs ==
- The Inland Empire 66ers won their fifth California League championship, as they defeated the Visalia Oaks in five games.

=== Playoff bracket ===
Division semi-finals
N1	San Jose	bye
N2	Visalia	2
N3	Stockton	1
S1	Inland Empire	bye
S2	Lake Elsinore	2
S3	High Desert	1

Division finals
N1	San Jose	2
N2	Visalia	3
S1	Inland Empire	3
S2	Lake Elsinore	1

Finals
N2	Visalia	2
S1	Inland Empire	3

== Awards ==
California League awards
Award name	Recipient
Most Valuable Player	Reid Brignac, Visalia Oaks

== See also ==
- 2006 Major League Baseball season
