= Cory Riordan =

American baseball player (born 1986)

- Pitcher
- Born: May 25, 1986 (age 39); Killingworth, Connecticut, U.S.
- Batted: Right Threw: Right

Professional debut
- KBO: April 3, 2014, for the LG Twins
- CPBL: July 18, 2015, for the Lamigo Monkeys

Last appearance
- KBO: October 15, 2014, for the LG Twins
- CPBL: October 7, 2017, for the Fubon Guardians

KBO statistics
- Win–loss record: 9–10
- Earned run average: 3.96
- Strikeouts: 77

CPBL statistics
- Win–loss record: 3–7
- Earned run average: 5.93
- Strikeouts: 50
- Stats at Baseball Reference

Teams
- LG Twins (2014); Lamigo Monkeys (2015); Fubon Guardians (2017)

Cory S. Riordan (born May 25, 1986) is an American former professional baseball pitcher. He played in the KBO League for the LG Twins, and in the Chinese Professional Baseball League (CPBL) for the Lamigo Monkeys and Fubon Guardians.

== Early years ==
Riordan was born on May 25, 1986, in Killingworth, Connecticut. He played university baseball at Fordham University. In 2006, he played collegiate summer baseball with the Falmouth Commodores of the Cape Cod Baseball League.

== Professional career ==
=== Colorado Rockies ===
Cory was originally drafted by the Colorado Rockies in the 6th round of the 2007 MLB draft. After signing, he was assigned to the Tri-City Dust Devils. He spent the entire 2008 season with the Single-A Asheville Tourists, and spent the entire 2009 season with the advanced Single-A Modesto Nuts. He played for the Double-A Tulsa Drillers in 2010, pitching to a 8–5 record and a 4.01 ERA with 135 strikeouts in 161.2 innings of work.

On November 19, 2010, Riordan was added to the Rockies' 40-man roster. Riordan split the 2011 season between Double-A and the Triple-A Colorado Springs Sky Sox. On October 5, 2011, Riordan was outrighted off of the 40-man roster without appearing in the majors. In 2012, Riordan split the season with Tulsa and Colorado Springs, pitching to a cumulative 4.37 ERA with 66 strikeouts in 94.2 innings of work. Riordan once again split time with the Double-A Tulsa Drillers and the Triple-A Colorado Springs Sky Sox in 2013. In 32 appearances, including 13 starts, Riordan had a 6–6 record with a 6.17 ERA and 65 strikeouts. Riordan elected free agency on November 4, 2013. In 188 career appearances, including 133 starts, Riordan has a 43–47 record with two saves, a 4.41 ERA and 729 strikeouts.

=== LG Twins ===
On January 10, 2014, Riordan agreed to a one-year, $300,000 contract with the LG Twins of the Korea Baseball Organization. He made his KBO debut on April 3, 2014. In 28 games for the Twins, Riordan pitched to a 9–10 record with a 3.96 ERA and 77 strikeouts over 168 innings pitched. He became a free agent after the season.

=== Bridgeport Bluefish/Lamigo Monkeys ===
Riordan signed with the Bridgeport Bluefish of the Atlantic League of Professional Baseball for the 2015 season. He made 17 starts in 18 appearances for the Bluefish, pitching to a 3.62 ERA with five victories and 82 strikeouts in 112.0 innings before his contract was purchased by the Lamigo Monkeys of the Chinese Professional Baseball League. In his time with the Monkeys, Riordan notched a 1–2 record with a 6.95 ERA in 4 games with the Monkeys before being released by the team in late August and was returned to the Bluefish. Riordan finished the season with the Bluefish a free agent after the year.

=== Detroit Tigers ===
On December 11, 2015, Riordan signed a minor-league contract with the Detroit Tigers. He split the season between the Double-A Erie SeaWolves and the Triple-A Toledo Mud Hens. On December 9, 2016, Riordan re-signed with the Tigers organization on a minor league contract. He was released on March 31, 2017.

=== Bridgeport Bluefish (second stint) ===
On April 4, 2017, Riordan signed with the Bridgeport Bluefish of the Atlantic League of Professional Baseball.

=== Fubon Guardians ===
On July 24, 2017, Riordan signed with the Fubon Guardians of the Chinese Professional Baseball League. On August 5, Riordan was promoted to the active roster. Riordan struggled to a 5.50 ERA in 52.1 innings for the Guardians in 2017.

=== Somserset Patriots ===
On February 5, 2018, Riordan signed with the Somerset Patriots of the Atlantic League of Professional Baseball after his rights were acquired in the Bridgeport Bluefish dispersal draft. Riordan was named to the 2018 ALPB All-Star game and became a free agent following the 2018 season.

=== New Britain Bees ===
On February 12, 2019, Riordan signed with the New Britain Bees of the Atlantic League of Professional Baseball. In 2019, Riordan pitched to a 5.84 ERA with 39 strikeouts in 114.0 innings pitched. He became a free agent after the season.

== Coaching career ==
On May 2, 2020, Riordan announced his retirement as an active player and that he'd accepted a role as a minor league coach in the Toronto Blue Jays organization. On March 8, 2021, Riordan was named the pitching coach for the GCL Blue Jays. In 2023 he was named pitching coach of the Dunedin Blue Jays.
