= Lancaster JetHawks =

- 1996–2020; Lancaster, California

| Team logo | Cap insignia |

Minor league affiliations
- Class: Class A-Advanced (1996–2020)
- League: California League (1996–2020)

Major league affiliations
- Team: Seattle Mariners (1996–2000); Arizona Diamondbacks (2001–2006); Boston Red Sox (2007–2008); Houston Astros (2009–2016); Colorado Rockies (2017–2020)

Minor league titles
- League titles (2): 2012; 2014
- Division titles (5): 2004; 2007; 2012; 2014; 2017
- First-half titles (7): 2000; 2004; 2007; 2008; 2013; 2014; 2017
- Second-half titles (5): 2007; 2008; 2013; 2016; 2017

Team data
- Name: Lancaster JetHawks (1996–2020)
- Ballpark: The Hangar (1996–2020)

The Lancaster JetHawks were a baseball team located in Lancaster, California. They were named for the city's association with the aerospace industry and played their home games at The Hangar. From 1996 to 2020, they were members of Minor League Baseball's California League, a Class A-Advanced league affiliated with Major League Baseball (MLB). With MLB's reorganization of the minor leagues after the 2020 season, Lancaster was not selected to continue in affiliated baseball, and ultimately folded.

== History ==
The team was founded as the Silver Sox in Reno in 1947, where they played as a Class C Team until 1951. In 1955, they were revived as a Class A team, and continued playing in Reno until moving to Riverside to become the Pilots in 1993. They made the move to Lancaster in 1996. Notable players to play for the JetHawks include José Cruz Jr. and Brandon Webb. While in Riverside, the team played at UC-Riverside Sports Center. The Pilots' previous owners chose Lancaster over Palm Springs in a lucrative offer.

In November 2005, the original owners of the JetHawks during their first 10 years in Lancaster, Clutch Play Baseball, LLC, sold the team to a group led by majority investor Peter Carfagna of Cleveland, Ohio. One of their first acts was to replace the stadium's original scoreboard with a more advanced video board. For the first time, this allowed for video replays and other views from cameras around the field. For the 2006 season, the JetHawks' manager was former major leaguer Brett Butler.

On September 29, 2006, the Boston Red Sox announced a two-year affiliation agreement with the JetHawks after losing their previous Carolina League affiliation in Wilmington. Since the Fenway Sports Group purchased the Carolina League's Salem Avalanche franchise after the 2007 season, with the stated intent of moving the Red Sox's High-A affiliation there once the 2007–2008 agreement term expired, the JetHawks were forced to find a new major league affiliate before the 2009 season—the Houston Astros.

On August 25, 2008, the JetHawks announced its new general manager, Antelope Valley native Larry Thornhill. Thornhill, a former JetHawks broadcaster from its inaugural season of 1996, took over day-to-day operations of the Lancaster organization from Brad Seymour who was promoted to vice president of both the JetHawks and Lake County Captains. Seymour joined the organization in 2004 and served as general manager for five seasons with the JetHawks.

Wes Clemente, after serving the 2009 season as the JetHawks' manager, took over the managerial position for the Corpus Christi Hooks, Houston's Double-A affiliate. On November 16, 2009, the JetHawks announced its new manager for the 2010 season, Tom Lawless. He served as the manager of the Lexington Legends, the Astros' Class A minor league team, for the 2009 season.

The JetHawks concluded the 2010 season with a 54–86 record, setting the worst season mark in franchise history.

The JetHawks have been lauded for their creative giveaways. Every season, they give away a NASA-related bobblehead to pay tribute to the Antelope Valley and its leading industry. The Buzz Aldrin bobblehead was a big hit. On July 12, 2008, the JetHawks gave away skateboards to the first 500 children to arrive at the ballpark. These skateboards were widely considered the most expensive and high-end giveaway of the season in minor league baseball. Minor League Baseball (MILB.com) rated the skateboard giveaway one of the top ten promotions of 2008 in the minor leagues.

On December 9, 2010, Tom Spencer was named as the JetHawks' manager for the 2011 season. He served as the manager of the Palm Beach Cardinals, the Advanced A affiliate of the St. Louis Cardinals, for the 2009 season.

On May 26, 2011, the Lancaster JetHawks announced that Larry Thornhill had resigned his position as vice president and general manager of the franchise for personal reasons. Derek Sharp, Lancaster's assistant general manager who has been with the organization since 2008, was named interim general manager for the remainder of the 2011 California League season. Brad Seymour, who was the JetHawks General Manager from 2004 – 2008, had also been named Senior Consultant for the JetHawks. Seymour currently also serves as vice president and general manager of the Lake County (OH) Captains, Class A affiliate of the Cleveland Indians under the direction of the Peter A. Carfagna ownership group which also controls the Lancaster JetHawks. Seymour, along with team President Peter E. Carfagna, will have direct oversight of the day-to-day activities of the JetHawks. On September 7, 2011, Derek Sharp was promoted from interim general manager to general manager.

On January 3, 2012, Rodney Linares was named as the JetHawks' manager for the 2012 season. He served as the manager of the Lexington Legends, the Class A affiliate of the Houston Astros, for the 2011 season.

The Lancaster JetHawks clinched a playoff berth after the 2012 season as the #2 seed Wild Card. In the Southern Division Mini-Series, the JetHawks beat the Lake Elsinore Storm, two games to one. In the Southern Division Championship Series, the JetHawks beat the First & Second Half Champion High Desert Mavericks, three games to one. On September 15, 2012, the Lancaster JetHawks became the California League Champions after sweeping the Northern Division Champion Modesto Nuts three games to none with a final score in Game 3 of 3–2. It would be the JetHawks’ first California League Championship title in franchise history.

On May 12, 2013 (Mother's Day), the Lancaster JetHawks beat the Stockton Ports, 2–0, as Kyle Hallock and Luis Cruz combined to throw the first nine-inning no-hitter in franchise history. The win was also JetHawks manager Rodney Linares' 300th career win as a manager. The only other no-hitter in JetHawks history came in 2010 when they no-hit the Lake Elsinore Storm in a combined 10-inning no-hitter. Robert Donovan, Edwin Walker, David Berner, David Carpenter, and Jose Trinidad pitched in the game for the JetHawks.

The Lancaster JetHawks clinched a playoff berth after the 2013 season as the First and Second Half Champions.

On December 20, 2013, Will Thornhill, son of former general manager Larry Thornhill, was named the new general manager of the Lancaster JetHawks after Derek Sharp accepted a job with the New Britain Rock Cats, the Double A affiliate of the Minnesota Twins.

On April 29, 2014, Lance McCullers Jr. and Kyle Smith combined to tie a Lancaster franchise record with 17 strikeouts against the High Desert Mavericks. The record was set on August 8, 1997, when then Mariners' farmhand Jason Bond struck out 14 batters and the bullpen fanned three at Recreation Park against the Visalia Oaks.

On May 13, 2014, Josh Hader, J. D. Osborne, and Daniel Minor combined to throw the third no-hitter in franchise history as the JetHawks beat the Bakersfield Blaze, 1–0, at the Hangar.

On June 5, 2014, designated hitter Dan Gulbransen doubled to lead of the eighth inning to complete the sixth cycle of JetHawks history in a 16–7 win over the Inland Empire 66ers at the Hangar. Gulbransen became the first JetHawk to hit for the cycle since Brandon Barnes and Freddy Parejo hit for the cycle on back-to-back days on June 8 and 9, 2010.

On June 11, 2014, the Lancaster JetHawks clinched the 2014 South Division First Half Championship title with a 16–3 win over the Rancho Cucamonga Quakes at the Hangar. The feat marks the sixth time the JetHawks have won the first half title in franchise history and the first time they've won back-to-back first halves since 2007 and 2008 as a Boston Red Sox affiliate. With three games remaining before the first half of the season concluded, the JetHawks tied the franchise record for first half wins with 43 that was set back in 2004. On June 13, 2014, the JetHawks set a new franchise record for first half wins with 44 with a 7–4 win over the Rancho Cucamonga Quakes at the Hangar.

The Lancaster JetHawks clinched a playoff spot as the First Half Champions after the 2014 season. In the Southern Division Championship Series, the JetHawks swept the Second Half Champion Inland Empire 66ers, three games to none. On September 15, 2014, the Lancaster JetHawks became the California League Champions after beating the Northern Division Champion Visalia Rawhide three games to two with a final score in Game 5 of 10–2. It would be the JetHawks' second California League Championship title in franchise history, achieved on the second anniversary of their first, and their second title in three seasons.

On November 12, 2014, Ballpark Digest reported that the Lancaster JetHawks were being sold by Peter A. Carfagna's ownership group to the ownership group headed by Jake Kerr and Jeff Mooney, current owners of the Vancouver Canadians. Upon closing, Kerr and Mooney will become the third ownership group in the JetHawks' 19-year history. The sale is expected to close by the end of the calendar year, after receiving approvals by the California League and Minor League Baseball and a review by Major League Baseball. On December 19, 2014, the Lancaster JetHawks announced their Field Staff for the 2015 season with Omar Lopez replacing Rodney Linares as JetHawks' skipper after three successful seasons that included two California League Championships (2012, 2014) and one California League Manager of the Year Award (2013). Lopez joins the JetHawks for his first season as manager and his 17th overall with the Astros organization. As manager of the Class A Quad Cities River Bandits in 2013, Lopez led the club to the Midwest League Championship title after an 81-57 finish in the regular season. Rodney Linares will take over as 2015 manager of the Double-A Corpus Christi Hooks.

On January 15, 2015, Tom Backemeyer was appointed executive vice president of the Lancaster JetHawks in advance of the 2015 season, effective January 6, 2015. The Lincoln, Nebraska native has a substantial background in Minor League Baseball. Prior to his arrival in Lancaster, Backemeyer helped develop franchises in Nashville, Rancho Cucumonga, Fresno, and in Everett, where he was named executive vice president of the Aquasox of the Northwest League. A graduate of Colorado State University (BA) with an MBA from University of Denver, Backemeyer is recognized as one of Minor League Baseball's promising young minds as he joins the JetHawks organization.

The Lancaster JetHawks clinched a playoff berth after the 2015 season as the #2 seed Wild Card. In the Southern Division Mini-Series, the High Desert Mavericks beat the JetHawks, two games to one.

The Lancaster JetHawks clinched a playoff spot as the Second Half Champions after the 2016 season, making it five straight playoff appearances. In the Southern Division Mini-Series, the JetHawks beat the Rancho Cucamonga Quakes, two games to one. In the Southern Division Championship Series, the JetHawks lost to the First Half Champion High Desert Mavericks, three games to one.

On October 3, 2016, the Lancaster JetHawks announced a new Player Development Contract with the Colorado Rockies. The agreement is for two years and will span the 2017 and 2018 seasons. The Rockies become the fifth affiliate in the JetHawks franchise history, replacing the Houston Astros who had been affiliated with the JetHawks for the past eight seasons (2009–2016). In January 2017, Fred Ocasio was named the JetHawks' new manager. Ocasio managed the Modesto Nuts during the 2015 & 2016 seasons and is entering his 21st year in the Rockies organization. Brandon Emanuel was named as the JetHawks' pitching coach. Emanuel also spent the past two seasons with Modesto. Derrick May was later named as the JetHawks' hitting coach for the 2017 season.

After winning the first half title for the 2017 season, the JetHawks sent a record nine players to participate in the California League All-Star Game at Recreation Ballpark in Visalia on June 20. Lancaster's all-star starters include first baseman Brian Mundell, second baseman Garrett Hampson, shortstop Brendan Rodgers, outfielder Sam Hilliard, and outfielder Wes Rogers. The JetHawks' all-star position player reserves include catcher Hamlet Marte and infielder/outfielder Mylz Jones. Right hand pitchers Craig Schlitter and Peter Lambert will represent the JetHawks' pitching staff. The midsummer showcase was the first one the California League played on its own since 1995 after sharing the event with the Carolina League for the past two decades where the Northern Division beat the Southern Division, 5–3.

The Lancaster JetHawks clinched a playoff berth after the 2017 season as the First and Second Half Champions, making it their sixth straight playoff appearance. The JetHawks finished the season with a California League leading record of 79–61. Outfielder Yonathan Daza won the California League batting title with a .341 batting average while outfielder Wes Rogers broke the franchise stolen base record after stealing 70 bases, breaking second baseman Emilio Bonifacio's 2006 record of 61. The JetHawks also broke the team franchise record for stolen bases with 313. They also broke the team batting average record with .308, topping the franchise record of .303 set in 2006 and tying the 1977 Lodi Dodgers for the California League record. In the Southern Division Championship Series, the JetHawks beat the wild card Rancho Cucamonga Quakes, three games to one. In the California League Championship Series, the JetHawks lost to the North Division Champion Modesto Nuts, three games to none.

The JetHawks hosted the California League All-Star Game on June 19, 2018. The two-day event included an all-day tailgate and 38 Special concert on June 18, and a Home Run Derby before the All-Star Game on June 19. The JetHawks unveiled a new video board during the All-Star Game festivities. The Lancaster JetHawks sent eight players to participate in the California League All-Star Game, the most of any team in the Southern Division where the Northern Division beat the Southern Division, 8–1. Lancaster's all-stars included right-handed pitchers Rico Garcia, Heath Holder, Reid Humphreys, and Justin Lawrence along with infielders Roberto Ramos, Alan Trejo, and Colton Welker as well as outfielder Vince Fernandez.

The Lancaster JetHawks clinched a playoff berth after the 2018 season as the #2 seed Wild Card. In the Southern Division Championship Series, the Rancho Cucamonga Quakes beat the JetHawks, three games to one.

Beginning in the 2019 season, the JetHawks gained an alter ego. During marked Friday night games of the 2019 season, the Lancaster JetHawks became the "El Viento de Lancaster" (Spanish for "The Wind of Lancaster"). It included many aspects of the original organization, such as new merchandise, new uniforms, and caps for the players to wear during games along with "El Viento" themed giveaways. For each "El Viento" night, The Hangar had taco trucks, free activities for kids, and music as part of Minor League Baseball's "Copa de la Diversión" (Spanish for "Fun Cup") in an effort to honor and embrace U.S. Hispanic and Latino culture.

After the cancellation of the 2020 season due to the COVID-19 pandemic, Major League Baseball took direct control of Minor League Baseball. The JetHawks were not among the teams invited to remain in affiliated baseball as members of the California League in 2021. The city and team explored options to continue play in 2021, including a potential arrangement with the Pecos League. However, these plans were ultimately not realized, and the team folded by March 2021.

== JetHawks cycling through history ==
The following JetHawks have hit for the cycle (a single, a double, a triple, and a home run in the same game).

| Player | Position | Date | Final score | Opponent |
|---|---|---|---|---|
| Pee Wee Lopez | C | August 15, 1999 | 27-5 (Win) | Lake Elsinore Storm |
| Juan Silvestre | OF | May 3, 2000 | 10-8 (Loss) | Bakersfield Blaze |
| Andy Green | 2B | August 21, 2002 | 15-3 (Win) | High Desert Mavericks (Away) |
| Freddy Parejo | OF | June 8, 2010 | 12-10 (Loss) | Visalia Rawhide |
| Brandon Barnes | OF | June 9, 2010 | 7-4 (Win) | Visalia Rawhide |
| Dan Gulbransen | OF | June 5, 2014 | 16-7 (Win) | Inland Empire 66ers |
| Marc Wik | OF | June 2, 2015 | 9-8 (Loss) | High Desert Mavericks (Away) |
| A. J. Reed | 1B | June 16, 2015 | 11-3 (Win) | Visalia Rawhide |

- Pee Wee Lopez (August 15, 1999) – the franchise's first cycle came on a historic Sunday for the Mariners' affiliate. Lopez, using a bat gifted to him by then-Mariner Alex Rodriguez, hit a home run to clinch the cycle and help the JetHawks to a 27–5 win over the Lake Elsinore Storm at The Hangar. The catcher helped Lancaster set Cal League records (some have since been broken) for runs scored, hits (28), home runs (8), and extra-base hits (16). Lopez's playing career ended after spending the 2002 season with two Triple-A teams, the Las Vegas 51s and Colorado Springs Sky Sox.
- Juan Silvestre (May 3, 2000) – Silvestre hit for the cycle as the JetHawks lost, 10–8, to the Bakersfield Blaze at The Hangar. The home run came in the middle of the first-ever back-to-back-to-back home runs in JetHawks history. Former big leaguer Termel Sledge began the trio of homers and Peanut Williams homered after Silvestre. The Dominican outfielder had a brief stint at Triple-A in the Mariners organization (Tacoma Rainiers) and topped out in Double-A with the Texas Rangers (Tulsa Drillers) before calling it a career.
- Andy Green (August 21, 2002) – The JetHawks second baseman and Arizona Diamondbacks farmhand doubled in the first inning, tripled in the sixth, singled in the eighth, and completed the cycle with a homer in the ninth in a 15–3 victory at High Desert over the Mavericks. Green's teammate and future big leaguer, Scott Hairston, followed Green's ninth-inning homer with a fly out to center field and finished a triple shy of his own cycle. Green would spend part of three seasons in the big leagues with the Arizona Diamondbacks (2004–2006) and appeared briefly with the New York Mets in 2009. Green won back-to-back Southern League Manager of the Year awards (2013–2014) with the Mobile BayBears and is serving as third base coach for the Arizona Diamondbacks for the 2015 season.
- Freddy Parejo (June 8, 2010) – The JetHawks had gone almost eight seasons without a cycle before Parejo doubled to complete the feat in the bottom of the ninth in a 12–10 loss to the Visalia Rawhide at The Hangar. The veteran minor leaguer, playing in his seventh professional season in 2010, homered in the second inning, singled in the fourth, and tripled in the eighth before his ninth-inning double. Originally drafted by the Milwaukee Brewers in 2003, Parejo had made it to the Triple-A Nashville Sounds in 2009 before signing with the Houston Astros. The native of Venezuela last played in affiliated baseball with the Corpus Christi Hooks in 2010.
- Brandon Barnes (June 9, 2010) – After watching his teammate Parejo hit for the cycle the previous day, Barnes become the fifth JetHawk to hit for the cycle in a 7–4 win over the Visalia Rawhide at The Hangar. The outfielder began his night with a first inning homer, then tripled in the fifth, and doubled in the seventh. He hit a slow roller to short in the eighth and hustled down the line for an infield hit to finish the cycle. The California-native debuted with the Houston Astros in 2012 and has spent two seasons in the big leagues with the Colorado Rockies.
- Dan Gulbransen (June 5, 2014) – After striking out with the bases loaded in his first at-bat, Gulbransen made sure to make his next four plate appearances count in a 16–7 rout of the Inland Empire 66ers at The Hangar. The Wisconsin-native hit a three-run triple in the third inning, a three-run homer in the fourth, and singled in the sixth before doubling down the right field line in the eighth. Gulbransen would announce his retirement from baseball later in the season.
- Marc Wik (June 2, 2015) – JetHawks utility man Marc Wik put the exclamation point on big offensive series by hitting for the cycle in a 9–8 loss at High Desert against the Mavericks. Derek Fisher had made headlines in the series opener with his 3-homer, 12-RBI performance and his teammates had combined to tie the Cal League record for home runs in a game in the series' second game. But Wik enjoyed his moment in the spotlight series finale when he doubled down the right field line to complete his cycle. The 22-year-old began his night with a second-inning single before hitting his first homer of the season in the third and tripling in the sixth.
- A. J. Reed (June 16, 2015) – Reed entered the season with a tremendous offensive track record, but had never hit for the cycle. That changed in an 11–3 win over the Visalia Rawhide at The Hangar. The 2014 Golden Spikes Award winner with the University of Kentucky belted a solo shot in the first inning, doubled in the fifth, and tripled in the seventh before singling in the eighth. Reed was due up sixth in the bottom of the eighth, but a Brett Phillips three-run homer helped guarantee Reed one final at-bat. The left-handed slugger had already hit three home runs and driven in nine in a game at Stockton against the Ports earlier in the season.

== The Hangar ==
The Lancaster JetHawks played home games at The Hangar, which opened in 1996 as Lancaster Municipal Stadium. The Hangar has just over 4,500 permanent seats, but can accommodate over 7,000 fans with grass seating along each foul line. The stadium has deep fences (350 feet (110 m) down the right and left field lines and 410 feet (120 m) to deep center field) to combat the prevailing winds of the Antelope Valley. Known now by its nickname "The Hangar" after the signage of Clear Channel Stadium (2005–2012) was removed during the 2012 season, the stadium has a NASA F/A-18 Hornet mounted on display at the front entrance.

On December 19, 2010, Ballpark Digest reported that the Lancaster JetHawks expected to save $48K the next season after the installation of solar panels on a ballpark carport which would supply 98% of The Hangar's electricity needs on a typical game night. The installation was part of a citywide emphasis on solar energy from civic structures. At the ballpark, 1,500 solar panels were to be installed on a 700-foot-long carport beside the ballpark, well outside of foul-ball range. The electricity generated by the 340-kilowatt panel system would supply 98% of the power needed to run the ballpark, including the ballpark lights, saving the owners of the JetHawks some $48,000 per year in utility costs. "The entire Lancaster community has embraced the city's mission to become the alternative energy capital of the world, and as the first minor league team in California to go solar, we’re happy to do our part", said JetHawks owner Peter Carfagna.

== Community Sports Network (CSN @ JetHawks.com) ==
On August 27, 2009, the Lancaster JetHawks created the Community Sports Network (CSN @ JetHawks.com), an internet radio station that brings almost two hundred games and thousands of hours of local sports talk coverage to the Antelope Valley each year. The creation was in response to several local radio stations in the Antelope Valley eliminating their high school and college radio coverage. The station streams live on the internet 24 hours a day, seven days a week, with all local sports coverage. The station also offers live play-by-play coverage of Lancaster JetHawks baseball, Antelope Valley College football and basketball, and a high school football and basketball game of the week, all accessible through the JetHawks' website. The free service launched on Saturday, September 5, 2009, at 6 pm with an hour-long pre-game show leading up to dual coverage of the Lancaster JetHawks game against the Inland Empire 66ers of San Bernardino and the Antelope Valley College Marauders football opener on the road against College of the Canyons.

As of the 2010 season, the Lancaster JetHawks have a new radio station and a new web home to broadcast every inning of JetHawks baseball. The team partnered with News Talk 1380, a High Desert Broadcasting station, which will carry every JetHawks game, including the regular season and playoffs. Launched in September 2009, CSN@JetHawks.com will stream all broadcasts live as well as offering special replays of events. Jeff Lasky, JetHawks' play-by-play broadcaster since the 2006 season, will once again be calling the action while being joined by newcomer Scott Blusiewicz.

On February 17, 2012, the Lancaster JetHawks announced its return to New Talk 1380 AM and a new voice for the 2012 season. The High Desert Broadcasting station with take over the play-by-play action live all season with Jason Schwartz, a Los Angeles native and University of Southern California graduate who was the voice of the Northwest League's Tri-City Dust Devils, Class A Short Season affiliate of the Colorado Rockies, for their 2011 season. A live stream of each game will also be broadcast online at JetHawks.com. The JetHawks Clubhouse Show, a weekly talk show, will continue to air every Wednesday at 5 pm (PST) on air and online at JetHawks.com.

== KaBoom, Stealth, and The Hawkettes ==
Since the 1996 inaugural season, KaBoom (KB for short) has been the JetHawks' mascot. In the 2008 season, he introduced an all-new look as part of his team's complete image makeover. KB entertains fans at games and participates in contests between innings. He can often be seen walking around the stadium planning his next stunt. KaBoom also encourages children in Antelope Valley schools to read with his own KaBoom's Reading Challenge. Before the 2009 season on March 21, 2009, KaBoom celebrated his 13th birthday at a party held in his honor at Clear Channel Stadium, where he revealed his younger brother, Stealth, to JetHawks fans.

From 2009 to 2011, the JetHawks reintroduced the all new Hawkettes, a dance team that helps pass out giveaways at the main gate, toss JetHawks and Astros merchandise into the stands, and demonstrate their dancing abilities with their own dance routines, along with KaBoom, between innings. The team previously appeared at the ballpark during the 1996 inaugural season.

== NASA Astronaut Race ==
Paying homage to the city's association with the aerospace industry, the Lancaster JetHawks started the Astronaut Race at the start of the 2015 season. During each home game, three mascots of former NASA astronauts John Glenn, Pete Knight, and Neil Armstrong participate in a foot race from in front of the right field fence to in front of the visitor's dugout on the third base side.

== Seasons ==
| League champions * | Division champions ^ |

| Season | Level | League | Division | Finish | Wins | Losses | Win% | Playoffs | Manager |
|---|---|---|---|---|---|---|---|---|---|
| 1996 | MiLB | California | Southern | 3rd | 71 | 69 | .507 | | Dave Brundage |
| 1997 | MiLB | California | Southern | 2nd | 75 | 66 | .532 | | Rick Burleson |
| 1998 | MiLB | California | Southern | 2nd | 78 | 62 | .557 | | Rick Burleson |
| 1999 | MiLB | California | Southern | 5th | 55 | 85 | .393 | | Darrin Garner |
| 2000 | MiLB | California | Southern | 1st | 89 | 51 | .636 | First Half Champions | Mark Parent |
| 2001 | MiLB | California | Southern | 5th | 61 | 79 | .436 | | Scott Coolbaugh |
| 2002 | MiLB | California | Southern | 3rd | 63 | 77 | .450 | | Bill Plummer and Steve Scarsone |
| 2003 | MiLB | California | Southern | 4th | 76 | 67 | .521 | | Mike Aldrete |
| 2004 | MiLB | California | Southern ^ | 1st | 86 | 54 | .614 | First Half Champions; Southern Division Champions | Wally Backman |
| 2005 | MiLB | California | Southern | 1st | 75 | 65 | .536 | | Bill Plummer |
| 2006 | MiLB | California | Southern | 4th | 68 | 72 | .486 | | Brett Butler |
| 2007 | MiLB | California | Southern | 1st | 83 | 57 | .593 | First Half Champions; Second Half Champions | Chad Epperson |
| 2008 | MiLB | California | Southern ^ | 1st | 76 | 64 | .543 | First Half Champions; Second Half Champions; Southern Division Champions | Chad Epperson |
| 2009 | MiLB | California | Southern | 5th | 56 | 84 | .400 | | Wes Clements |
| 2010 | MiLB | California | Southern | 4th | 54 | 86 | .386 | | Tom Lawless |
| 2011 | MiLB | California | Southern | 4th | 55 | 85 | .393 | | Tom Spencer |
| 2012 | MiLB | California * | Southern ^ | 2nd | 74 | 66 | .529 | Wild Card Winners; Southern Division Champions; California League Champions | Rodney Linares |
| 2013 | MiLB | California | Southern | 1st | 82 | 58 | .586 | First Half Champions; Second Half Champions | Rodney Linares |
| 2014 | MiLB | California * | Southern ^ | 1st | 78 | 62 | .557 | First Half Champions; Southern Division Champions; California League Champions | Rodney Linares |
| 2015 | MiLB | California | Southern | 2nd | 75 | 65 | .536 | Wild Card Winners | Omar Lopez |
| 2016 | MiLB | California | Southern | 3rd | 77 | 63 | .550 | Second Half Champions | Ramon Vazquez |
| 2017 | MiLB | California | Southern ^ | 1st | 79 | 61 | .564 | First Half Champions; Second Half Champions; Southern Division Champions | Fred Ocasio |
| 2018 | MiLB | California | Southern | 2nd | 70 | 70 | .500 | Wild Card Winners | Fred Ocasio |
| 2019 | MiLB | California | Southern | 3rd | 68 | 70 | .493 | Wild Card Winners | Scott Little |
| 2020 | MiLB | California | Southern | League canceled due to COVID-19 pandemic | | | | | |
| All-time record | | | | | 1,724 | 1,638 | .513 | | |

== Lancaster JetHawks' Hall of Fame ==
Charter Inductees – Class of 2003 (August 16, 2003)

- Jim Slaton (Pitching Coach, 1997–1998)
- José Cruz Jr. (Outfielder, 1996)
- Joe Mays (Pitcher, 1997)
- Mike and Judy Ellis (Owners)
- Matt and Shelly Ellis (Owners)
- Larry Thornhill (Public Address Announcer)
- Jim Gilley (City Manager of the City of Lancaster)
- City of Lancaster
- Clutch Play Baseball, LLC

Class of 2004

- Rick Burleson (Manager, 1997–1998)
- Ken Cloude (Pitcher, 1996)
- Juan Pierre (Outfielder of 1999 Lancaster Stealth, California Fall League Champions)
- The Flight Crew Booster Club

Class of 2005

- Brandon Webb (Pitcher, 2001 & Baseball America's 2003 Major League Rookie of the Year)
- Bud Jones (Head Baseball Coach of Antelope Valley High School & Antelope Valley College & 1971 National High School Coach of the Year)

Class of 2006

- Jack Wilson (Infielder of the 1999 Lancaster Stealth, California Fall League Champions)
- Larry Lake (Contributor)

Class of 2007

- Dan Uggla (Infielder, 2002–2004)
- Wally Backman (Manager, 2004)
- Frank Slaton (Friends of Baseball)

Class of 2008

- Miguel Montero (Catcher, 2005)
- Mark Reynolds (Infielder, 2006)
- Brandon Inge (Infielder of 1999 Lancaster Stealth, California Fall League Champions)
- Dave Trembley (Friends of Baseball)

Class of 2009

- Brian Golden (Antelope Valley Press Sportswriter)
- Chad Epperson (Manager, 2007–2008)
- John Laferney (Director of Stadium Operations)
- Brian Fuentes (Pitcher, 1998)

Class of 2010

- Dave Guenther (Official Scorer)
- Lloyd McClendon (Manager, 1999 Lancaster Stealth, California Fall League Champions)
- Willie Bloomquist (Infielder, 2000)
- Justin Masterson (Pitcher, 2007)

Class of 2011

- Dámaso Marte (Pitcher, 1997)
- Dan Munz (Head Groundskeeper, 1996 & City of Lancaster Maintenance Coordinator)
- Kevin Younkin (Account Executive, 1996; Director of Ticketing & Group Sales, 1997; assistant general manager, 1998; general manager of the 1999 Lancaster Stealth, California Fall League Champions; general manager, 2000–2002; California League Executive of the Year, 2000)

Class of 2012

- Aaron Bates (Infielder, 2007)
- Dan Hubbard (JetHawks Radio Broadcaster)
- Perry Husband (Baseball Skill Innovator and Author)
- Curt Redecker (Friends of Baseball and former chairman of the Flight Crew Booster Club)

Class of 2013

- Jose Altuve (Infielder, 2010 & 2011)
- Carlos González (Outfielder, 2006)
- Don Alexander (Pitching Coach, 2012 – present)
- Darryl Robinson (Hitting Coach, 2009 – present)
- Rodney Linares (Manager, 2012 – present)

Class of 2014

- Daniel Nava (Outfielder, 2008)
- J.B. Shuck (Outfielder, 2009)
- Harley Smith (Quartz Hill Pony League & Paraclete High School Coach)
- Doug Mapson (Palmdale High School Coach & Major League Baseball Scout)
- Derek Sharp (General Manager, 2011–2013)
- Gayland Devers (Little League Coach & JetHawks Head Usher)

Class of 2015

- Dallas Keuchel (Pitcher, 2010)
- Ramon Vazquez (Infielder, 1998 & Coach, 2014)
- Doug DeCinces (Friends of Baseball)

Class of 2016

- Carlos Correa (Shortstop, 2014)
- George Springer (Outfielder, 2012)

Class of 2018

- Jack Kerr (Owner)
- Jeff Mooney (Owner)
- Andy Dunn (President)
- Tom Backemeyer (Executive Vice President)
- Enrique Hernández (Infielder, 2012)
- Domingo Santana (Outfielder, 2012)
- Alex Bregman (Infielder, 2015)

== Notable alumni ==
- Jose Altuve
- Daniel Bard
- Willie Bloomquist
- Emilio Bonifacio
- Alex Bregman
- Jason Bulger
- Jason Castro
- Lance Cormier
- Carlos Correa
- José Cruz Jr.
- J. D. Davis
- Stephen Drew
- Brian Fuentes
- Carlos González
- Scott Hairston
- Enrique Hernández
- Conor Jackson
- Ryan Kalish
- Dallas Keuchel
- Dámaso Marte
- Justin Masterson
- Joe Mays
- Miguel Montero
- Daniel Nava
- Micah Owings
- Joel Piñeiro
- Carlos Quentin
- Mark Reynolds
- Josh Reddick
- Domingo Santana
- J.B. Shuck
- Jonathan Singleton
- George Springer
- Garrett Stubbs
- Dan Uggla
- Jonathan Villar
- Brandon Webb
